= Ajak (disambiguation) =

Ajak may refer to:

- Ajak, a fictional character in Marvel Comics
- KRI Ajak, an Indonesian naval vessel
- Ajak (Hungary), a town in Hungary
- Ajak Deng, a South Sudanese-Australian model
- Ajak Magot, a South Sudanese professional basketball player
- Bangs (rapper), birth name Ajak Chol
- Oyay Deng Ajak, a South Sudanese politician
- Peter Biar Ajak, a South Sudanese peace activist, scholar, and former political prisoner
