= VCU Rams men's basketball statistical leaders =

The VCU Rams men's basketball statistical leaders are individual statistical leaders of the VCU Rams men's basketball program in various categories, including points, assists, blocks, rebounds, and steals. Within those areas, the lists identify single-game, single-season, and career leaders. The Rams represent Virginia Commonwealth University in the NCAA Division I Atlantic 10 Conference.

VCU began competing in intercollegiate basketball in 1968. The NCAA did not officially record assists as a stat until the 1983–84 season, and blocks and steals until the 1985–86 season, but VCU's record books includes players in these stats before these seasons. These lists are updated through the end of the 2020–21 season.

== Scoring ==
Career
Rk	Player	Points	Seasons
1	Eric Maynor	1,953	2005–06 2006–07 2007–08 2008–09
2	Treveon Graham	1,882	2011–12 2012–13 2013–14 2014–15
3	Kendrick Warren	1,858	1990–91 1991–92 1992–93 1993–94
4	Charles Wilkins	1,716	1968–69 1969–70 1970–71
5	Bradford Burgess	1,684	2008–09 2009–10 2010–11 2011–12
6	Melvin Johnson	1,657	2012–13 2013–14 2014–15 2015–16
7	Phil Stinnie	1,645	1984–85 1985–86 1986–87 1987–88
8	Calvin Duncan	1,630	1981–82 1982–83 1983–84 1984–85
9	Domonic Jones	1,616	2000–01 2001–02 2002–03 2003–04
10	Jesse Dark	1,584	1970–71 1971–72 1972–73 1973–74

Season
Rk	Player	Points	Season
1	Phil Stinnie	803	1987–88
2	Eric Maynor	760	2008–09
3	Chris Cheeks	667	1988–89
4	Charles Wilkins	660	1969–70
5	Melvin Johnson	626	2015–16
6	Justin Tillman	625	2017–18
7	Jamie Skeen	611	2010–11
8	Chris Cheeks	606	1987–88
9	Eric Maynor	573	2007–08
10	Bradford Burgess	571	2010–11

Single game
Rk	Player	Points	Season	Opponent
1	Charles Wilkins	45	1968–69	West Liberty St.
2	Chris Cheeks	42	1988–89	Old Dominion
3	Willie Taylor	41	2000–01	Evansville
4	Tyron McCoy	40	1993–94	George Mason
	Charles Wilkins	40	1970–71	Virginia Union
6	Chris Cheeks	39	1988–89	Jacksonville
7	Willie Taylor	38	2002–03	Hampton
8	Ace Baldwin Jr.	37	2022–23	Saint Louis
	Justin Tillman	37	2017–18	Dayton
	Chris Cheeks	37	1988–89	South Alabama

== Rebounds ==
Career
Rk	Player	Rebounds	Seasons
1	Lorenza Watson	1,143	1975–76 1976–77 1977–78 1978–79
2	Kendrick Warren	1,049	1990–91 1991–92 1992–93 1993–94
3	Justin Tillman	922	2014–15 2015–16 2016–17 2017–18
4	Juvonte Reddic	895	2010–11 2011–12 2012–13 2013–14
5	Bernard Harris	839	1970–71 1971–72 1972–73 1973–74
6	Treveon Graham	803	2011–12 2012–13 2013–14 2014–15
7	Larry Sanders	776	2007–08 2008–09 2009–10
8	Richard Jones	755	1971–72 1972–73 1973–74 1974–75
9	Kenny Stancell	744	1978–79 1979–80 1980–81 1981–82
10	Mike Schlegel	743	1981–82 1982–83 1983–84 1984–85

Season
Rk	Player	Rebounds	Season
1	Charles Wilkins	398	1969–70
2	Kendrick Warren	336	1993–94
3	Bernard Hopkins	333	1995–96
4	Lorenza Watson	332	1977–78
5	Justin Tillman	327	2017–18
6	Greg McDougald	323	1970–71
7	Larry Sanders	319	2009–10
8	Lorenza Watson	313	1978–79
9	Lorenza Watson	311	1976–77
10	Juvonte Reddic	294	2013–14

Single game
Rk	Player	Rebounds	Season	Opponent
1	Charles Wilkins	28	1969–70	Southeastern

== Assists ==
Career
Rk	Player	Assists	Seasons
1	Eric Maynor	674	2005–06 2006–07 2007–08 2008–09
2	Ed Sherod	582	1977–78 1978–79 1979–80 1980–81
3	Joey Rodriguez	580	2007–08 2008–09 2009–10 2010–11
4	Rolando Lamb	550	1981–82 1982–83 1983–84 1984–85
5	LaMar Taylor	527	1997–98 1998–99 1999–00 2000–01
6	JeQuan Lewis	505	2013–14 2014–15 2015–16 2016–17
7	Dave Edwards	497	1970–71 1971–72 1972–73 1973–74
8	Darius Theus	462	2009–10 2010–11 2011–12 2012–13
9	Calvin Duncan	434	1981–82 1982–83 1983–84 1984–85
10	Ace Baldwin Jr.	419	2020–21 2021–22 2022–23

Season
Rk	Player	Assists	Season
1	Eric Maynor	224	2006–07
2	Eric Maynor	210	2008–09
3	Joey Rodriguez	208	2009–10
	Joey Rodriguez	208	2010–11
5	Keith Highsmith	197	1974–75
6	LaMar Taylor	194	1998–99
7	Kenny Harris	188	1992–93
8	JeQuan Lewis	183	2015–16
9	Jonathan Williams	182	2017–18
10	Ed Sherod	180	1980–81

Single game
Rk	Player	Assists	Season	Opponent
1	Joey Rodriguez	17	2010–11	UNC Greensboro

== Steals ==
Career
Rk	Player	Steals	Seasons
1	Briante Weber	374	2011–12 2012–13 2013–14 2014–15
2	Rolando Lamb	257	1981–82 1982–83 1983–84 1984–85
3	Joey Rodriguez	237	2007–08 2008–09 2009–10 2010–11
	Darius Theus	237	2009–10 2010–11 2011–12 2012–13
5	JeQuan Lewis	205	2013–14 2014–15 2015–16 2016–17
6	Ed Sherod	202	1977–78 1978–79 1979–80 1980–81
7	LaMar Taylor	193	1997–98 1998–99 1999–00 2000–01
8	Ace Baldwin Jr.	183	2020–21 2021–22 2022–23
9	Doug Brooks	170	2013–14 2014–15 2015–16 2016–17
10	Eric Maynor	168	2005–06 2006–07 2007–08 2008–09

Season
Rk	Player	Steals	Season
1	Briante Weber	121	2013–14
2	Briante Weber	98	2012–13
3	Rolando Lamb	88	1984–85
4	Darius Theus	85	2012–13
5	Briante Weber	78	2014–15
6	Briante Weber	77	2011–12
7	Rolando Lamb	72	1982–83
8	Nicky Jones	71	1985–86
	Darius Theus	71	2011–12
10	Doug Brooks	69	2015–16

Single game
Rk	Player	Steals	Season	Opponent
1	Briante Weber	10	2012–13	Florida Gulf Coast

== Blocks ==
Career
Rk	Player	Blocks	Seasons
1	Lorenza Watson	391	1975–76 1976–77 1977–78 1978–79
2	Larry Sanders	277	2007–08 2008–09 2009–10
3	Mo Alie-Cox	255	2013–14 2014–15 2015–16 2016–17
4	L.F. Likcholitov	207	1998–99 1999–00 2000–01 2001–02
5	Kendrick Warren	193	1990–91 1991–92 1992–93 1993–94
6	Sherron Mills	134	1990–91 1991–92 1992–93
7	Juvonte Reddic	123	2010–11 2011–12 2012–13 2013–14
8	Hason Ward	119	2019–20 2020–21 2021–22
9	Kenny Stancell	117	1978–79 1979–80 1980–81 1981–82
10	George Byrd	116	1993–94 1994–95 1995–96 1996–97

Season
Rk	Player	Blocks	Season
1	Lorenza Watson	135	1976–77
2	Lorenza Watson	129	1978–79
3	Lorenza Watson	127	1977–78
4	Larry Sanders	95	2007–08
5	Larry Sanders	92	2008–09
6	Larry Sanders	90	2009–10
7	L.F. Likcholitov	79	2001–02
8	Luke Bamgboye	75	2024–25
9	Mo Alie-Cox	71	2016–17
10	Mo Alie-Cox	68	2015–16
	Mo Alie-Cox	68	2014–15

Single game
Rk	Player	Blocks	Season	Opponent
1	Lorenza Watson	11	1976–77	South Carolina State
