= 1988 Pacific-10 Conference men's basketball tournament =

- Classification: Division I
- Season: 1987–88
- Teams: 10
- Site: McKale Center; Tucson, Arizona
- Champions: Arizona (1st title)
- Winning coach: Lute Olson (1st title)
- MVP: Sean Elliott (Arizona)
- Attendance: 66,477 (5 sessions)

1987–88 Pacific-10 Conference men's basketball standings
	Conf.				Overall
Team	W		L	PCT	W		L	PCT
No. 2 Arizona †	17	–	1	.944	35	–	3	.921
Oregon State	12	–	6	.667	20	–	11	.645
UCLA	12	–	6	.667	16	–	14	.533
Stanford	11	–	7	.611	21	–	12	.636
Oregon	10	–	8	.556	16	–	14	.533
Washington State	7	–	11	.389	13	–	16	.448
Arizona State	6	–	12	.333	13	–	16	.448
USC	5	–	13	.278	7	–	21	.250
California	5	–	13	.278	9	–	20	.310
Washington	5	–	13	.278	10	–	19	.345
† Conference tournament winner As of April 15, 1988; Rankings from AP Poll

The 1988 Pacific-10 Conference men's basketball tournament was played March 10–13 at McKale Center in Tucson, Arizona, on the University of Arizona campus. Both finalists made their first appearances in the title game, which was the first final to feature both top seeds. The champion of the tournament was host Arizona, which received the Pac-10's automatic bid to the NCAA tournament. The Most Outstanding Player was Sean Elliott of Arizona.

This was the tournament's second edition, and all ten teams participated.

== Bracket ==
Play-in Round; Thursday, March 10
8	USC	59
9	California	75
7	Arizona State	82
10	Washington	96

Quarterfinals; Friday, March 11
1	#3 Arizona	88
9	California	64
4	Stanford	88
5	Oregon	67
3	UCLA	71
6	Washington State	73
2	Oregon State	80
10	Washington	61

Semifinals; Saturday, March 12
1	#3 Arizona	97
4	Stanford	83
6	Washington State	68
2	Oregon State	74**

Final; Sunday, March 13
1	#3 Arizona	93
2	Oregon State	67

Asterisk denotes overtime period.

== Tournament Notes ==
- Arizona's 26 point win (93-67) over Oregon State was the largest margin of victory for the final game in Pac-10/12 Tournament history.
- Arizona's 93 points is still a record for the most points scored in the Pac-10/12 tournament final game.
- #10 Washington and #9 Cal each upset their opponents early on to be the first winners for their respective seeds in Pac-10 Tournament history.
- A current record high FG% for a game of 68.3% was set by Cal vs. USC (28-of-41).
- A current record of most points for a tournament was set by Arizona, (3 games).
- A current record FG% for this tournament of 79.1% was set by Isaac Austin of Arizona State, (19-of-24, 3 games, min 15 made).

== All tournament team ==
- Sean Elliott, Arizona
- Anthony Cook, Arizona
- Steve Kerr, Arizona
- Todd Lichti, Stanford
- Gary Payton, Oregon State
