= 1987–88 Arizona Wildcats men's basketball team =

American college basketball season

1987–88 Arizona Wildcats men's basketball

Great Alaska Shootout champions Pacific-10 Regular-Season Champions Pacific-10 Tournament champions

NCAA tournament, Final Four
- Conference: Pacific-10

Ranking
- Coaches: No. 2
- AP: No. 2
- Record: 35–3 (17–1 Pac-10)
- Head coach: Lute Olson (5th season)
- Assistant coaches: Ricky Byrdsong (6th season); Kevin O'Neill (2nd season)
- Home arena: McKale Center (Capacity: 14,545)

1987–88 Pacific-10 Conference men's basketball standings
	Conf.				Overall
Team	W		L	PCT	W		L	PCT
No. 2 Arizona †	17	–	1	.944	35	–	3	.921
Oregon State	12	–	6	.667	20	–	11	.645
UCLA	12	–	6	.667	16	–	14	.533
Stanford	11	–	7	.611	21	–	12	.636
Oregon	10	–	8	.556	16	–	14	.533
Washington State	7	–	11	.389	13	–	16	.448
Arizona State	6	–	12	.333	13	–	16	.448
USC	5	–	13	.278	7	–	21	.250
California	5	–	13	.278	9	–	20	.310
Washington	5	–	13	.278	10	–	19	.345
† Conference tournament winner As of April 15, 1988; Rankings from AP Poll

The 1987–88 Arizona Wildcats men's basketball team represented the University of Arizona during the 1987–88 NCAA Division I men's basketball season. The head coach was Lute Olson. The team played its home games in the McKale Center in Tucson, Arizona, and was a member of the Pacific-10 Conference. In the Pacific-10 Basketball tournament, Arizona beat Oregon State by a score of 93–67 to claim its first Pac-10 title. The Wildcats built on that momentum by reaching the Final Four of the NCAA tournament.

== Roster ==
1987–88 Arizona Wildcats men's basketball team
Players
Coaches

Pos.	#	Name	Height	Weight	Year	Previous school	Hometown
F	00	Anthony Cook	—	—	Jr	Van Nuys HS	Los Angeles, CA
PG	11	Kenny Lofton	6 ft 0 in (1.83 m)	180 lb (82 kg)	Jr	Washington HS	East Chicago, IN
G	20	Craig McMillan	6 ft 6 in (1.98 m)	—	Sr	Cloverdale HS	Cloverdale, CA
C	23	Tom Tolbert	6 ft 7 in (2.01 m)	225 lb (102 kg)	Sr	Cerritos College
PG	24	Matt Muehlebach	6 ft 2 in (1.88 m)	—	Fr	Stillwell HS	Rockhurst, KS
G	25	Steve Kerr	6 ft 3 in (1.91 m)	175 lb (79 kg)	RS Sr	Palisades Charter HS	Los Angeles, CA
SF	32	Sean Elliott	6 ft 8 in (2.03 m)	210 lb (95 kg)	Jr	Cholla HS	Tucson, AZ
F	33	Joe Turner	6 ft 9 in (2.06 m)	—	Sr	Foothill HS	Bakersfield, CA
C	34	Brian David	6 ft 9 in (2.06 m)	—	So	Kuemper HS	Templeton, IA
SF	35	Jud Buechler	6 ft 6 in (1.98 m)	210 lb (95 kg)	So	Poway HS	Poway, CA
C	42	Sean Rooks (redshirt)	6 ft 10 in (2.08 m)	250 lb (113 kg)	Fr	Fontana HS	Fontana, CA
G	44	Harvey Mason	6 ft 3 in (1.91 m)	—	RS So	Crescenta HS	La Crescenta, CA
F/C	45	Mark Georgeson (redshirt)	6 ft 10 in (2.08 m)	235 lb (107 kg)	Fr	Marina HS	Huntington Beach, CA

Head coach

- Lute Olson (Augsburg)

Assistant coach(es)

Legend

- (C) Team captain
- (S) Suspended
- (I) Ineligible
- (W) Walk-on
- Injured
- Current redshirt

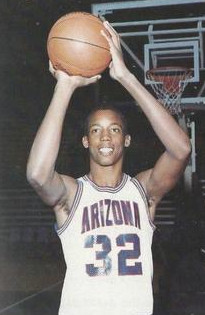
Sean Elliott in 1987

== Schedule and results ==
The victory over Long Beach State in the home opener at McKale Center began a 71-game home court winning streak.

Date time, TV	Rank^{#}	Opponent^{#}	Result	Record	High points	High rebounds	High assists	Site (attendance) city, state
Non-conference regular season
11/27/1987*	No. 17	vs. Duquesne; Great Alaska Shootout	W 133–78	1–0	–	–	–	Sullivan Arena; Anchorage, AK
11/28/1987*	No. 17	vs. No. 9 Michigan; Great Alaska Shootout	W 79–64	2–0	18 – Tolbert	11 – Tolbert	–	Sullivan Arena; Anchorage, AK
11/30/1987*; ESPN	No. 17	vs. No. 1 Syracuse; Great Alaska Shootout	W 80–69	3–0	16 – Elliott	–	–	Sullivan Arena; Anchorage, AK
12/4/1987*	No. 9	Long Beach State	W 94–62	4–0	–	–	–	McKale Center; Tucson, AZ
12/5/1987*	No. 9	Pepperdine	W 73–68	5–0	17 – Tolbert	–	–	McKale Center; Tucson, AZ
12/8/1987*	No. 4	Northern Arizona	W 77–59	6–0	–	–	–	McKale Center; Tucson, AZ
12/12/1987*; 6:05 pm	No. 4	at No. 3 Iowa	W 66–59	7–0	18 – Tolbert	–	–	Carver-Hawkeye Arena; Iowa City, IA
12/16/1987*	No. 2	Arkansas-Little Rock	W 77–59	8–0	–	–	–	McKale Center; Tucson, AZ
12/20/1987	No. 2	at Washington	W 110–71	9–0 (1–0)	–	–	–	Hec Edmundson Pavilion; Seattle, WA
12/22/1987	No. 2	at Washington State	W 89–55	10–0 (2–0)	–	–	–	Friel Court; Pullman, WA
12/29/1987*	No. 1	Michigan State; Fiesta Bowl Basketball Classic	W 78–58	11–0	–	–	–	McKale Center; Tucson, AZ
12/30/1987*; 8:00 p.m.	No. 1	No. 9 Duke; Fiesta Bowl Basketball Classic	W 91–85	12–0	31 – Elliott	–	–	McKale Center (13,270); Tucson, AZ
1/2/1988*	No. 1	at New Mexico	L 59–61	12–1	27 – Elliott	–	–	The Pit (18,100); Albuquerque, NM
Pac-10 regular season
1/7/1988	No. 3	California	W 80–51	13–1 (3–0)	–	–	–	McKale Center; Tucson, AZ
1/9/1988	No. 3	Stanford	W 90–65	14–1 (4–0)	–	–	–	McKale Center; Tucson, AZ
1/14/1988	No. 1	Oregon State	W 70–48	15–1 (5–0)	–	–	–	Gill Coliseum; Corvallis, OR
1/16/1988	No. 1	Oregon	W 70–54	16–1 (6–0)	–	–	–	McArthur Court; Eugene, OR
1/21/1988	No. 1	USC	W 92–48	17–1 (7–0)	–	–	–	McKale Center; Tucson, AZ
1/24/1988	No. 1	UCLA; Rivalry	W 86–74	18–1 (8–0)	–	–	–	McKale Center (13,258); Tucson, AZ
1/28/1988	No. 1	Arizona State; Rivalry	W 99–59	19–1 (9–0)	–	–	–	McKale Center; Tucson, AZ
1/30/1988*	No. 1	No. 13 Illinois	W 78–70	20–1	–	–	–	McKale Center (13,227); Tucson, AZ
2/4/1988	No. 1	at Stanford	L 74–82	20–2 (9–1)	22 – Elliott	–	–	Maples Pavilion (7,500); Stanford, CA
2/6/1988	No. 1	at California	W 74–62	21–2 (10–1)	–	–	–	Harmon Gym; Berkeley, CA
2/11/1988	No. 3	Oregon	W 89–57	22–2 (11–1)	–	–	–	McKale Center; Tucson, AZ
2/14/1988	No. 3	Oregon State	W 77–62	23–2 (12–1)	–	–	–	McKale Center; Tucson, AZ
2/18/1988	No. 3	at USC	W 103–68	24–2 (13–1)	–	–	–	Los Angeles Sports Arena; Los Angeles, CA
2/20/1988	No. 3	at UCLA; Rivalry	W 78–76 ^{OT}	25–2 (14–1)	–	–	–	Pauley Pavilion (12,037); Los Angeles, CA
2/24/1988	No. 3	at Arizona State; Rivalry	W 101–73	26–2 (15–1)	–	–	–	ASU Activity Center; Tempe, AZ
3/3/1988	No. 3	Washington State	W 79–41	27–2 (16–1)	–	–	–	McKale Center; Tucson, AZ
3/5/1988	No. 3	Washington	W 89–71	28–2 (17–1)	–	–	–	McKale Center; Tucson, AZ
Pac-10 Tournament
3/11/1988*	(1) No. 3	(9) California; Pac-10 Tournament Quarterfinal	W 88–64	29–2	–	–	–	McKale Center; Tucson, AZ
3/12/1988*	(1) No. 3	(4) Stanford; Pac-10 Tournament Semifinal	W 97–83	30–2	–	–	–	McKale Center; Tucson, AZ
3/13/1988*	(1) No. 3	(2) Oregon State; Pac-10 Tournament Championship	W 83–67	31–2	–	–	–	McKale Center; Tucson, AZ
NCAA Tournament
3/18/1988*; CBS	(W 1) No. 2	vs. (W 16) Cornell; First Round	W 90–50	32–2	24 – Cook	5 – Tied	5 – McMillan	Pauley Pavilion; Los Angeles, CA
3/20/1988*; CBS	(W 1) No. 2	vs. (W 8) Seton Hall; Second Round	W 84–55	33–2	20 – Cook	6 – Cook	3 – Tied	Pauley Pavilion; Los Angeles, CA
3/25/1988*; CBS	(W 1) No. 2	vs. (W 5) No. 17 Iowa; Sweet Sixteen	W 99–79	34–2	25 – Elliott	9 – Tolbert	8 – Tied	Kingdome; Seattle, WA
3/27/1988*; CBS	(W 1) No. 2	vs. (W 2) No. 7 North Carolina; Elite Eight	W 70–52	35–2	24 – Elliott	6 – Tolbert	3 – Tied	Kingdome; Seattle, WA
4/2/1988; 6:12 pm, CBS	(W 1) No. 2	vs. (SE 1) No. 4 Oklahoma; Final Four	L 78–86	35–3	31 – Elliott	13 – Tolbert	5 – Kerr	Kemper Arena; Kansas City, MO
*Non-conference game. ^{#}Rankings from AP Poll. (#) Tournament seedings in parentheses.

== NCAA basketball tournament ==
Seeding in brackets

- West
  - Arizona (1) 90, Cornell (16) 50
  - Arizona 84, Seton Hall (8) 55
  - Arizona 99, Iowa (5) 79
  - Arizona 70, North Carolina (2) 52
- Final Four
  - Oklahoma 86, Arizona 78

== Awards and honors ==
- Sean Elliott, Pacific-10 Conference men's basketball tournament Most Valuable Player
- Sean Elliott, Pacific-10 Player of the Year

== Team players in the 1988 NBA draft ==
Round	Pick	Player	NBA club
2	34	Tom Tolbert	Charlotte Hornets
2	50	Steve Kerr	Phoenix Suns
