= 1987–88 UTEP Miners men's basketball team =

American college basketball season

1987–88 UTEP Miners men's basketball

NCAA tournament, first round
- Conference: Western Athletic Conference
- Record: 23–10 (10–6 WAC)
- Head coach: Don Haskins (27th season)
- Home arena: Special Events Center

1987–88 WAC men's basketball standings
	Conf.				Overall
Team	W		L	PCT	W		L	PCT
No. 19 BYU	13	–	3	.813	26	–	6	.813
No. 13 Wyoming †	11	–	5	.688	26	–	6	.813
Utah	11	–	5	.688	19	–	11	.633
UTEP	10	–	6	.625	23	–	10	.697
New Mexico	8	–	8	.500	22	–	14	.611
Colorado State	8	–	8	.500	22	–	13	.629
San Diego State	5	–	11	.313	12	–	17	.414
Air Force	4	–	12	.250	11	–	17	.393
Hawaii	2	–	14	.125	4	–	25	.138
† 1988 WAC tournament winner Rankings from AP poll

The 1987–88 UTEP Miners men's basketball team represented the University of Texas at El Paso in the 1987–88 college basketball season. The team was led by head coach Don Haskins. The Miners finished 23–10 (10–6 in WAC) and reached the NCAA tournament.

== Roster ==
1987–88 UTEP Miners men's basketball team
Players
Coaches

Pos.	#	Name	Height	Weight	Year	Hometown
G	10	Tim Hardaway	6 ft 0 in (1.83 m)	160 lb (73 kg)	Jr	Chicago, Illinois
F	34	Antonio Davis	6 ft 9 in (2.06 m)	220 lb (100 kg)	So	Oakland, California
F		Chris Sandle	6 ft 6 in (1.98 m)	—	Sr
G		Chris Blocker	6 ft 5 in (1.96 m)	—	Sr
F		Wayne Campbell	6 ft 7 in (2.01 m)	—	Sr
G		Terry Stallworth	6 ft 4 in (1.93 m)	—	Jr
F		Jerry Jones	6 ft 8 in (2.03 m)	—	So
G		Eddie Williams	6 ft 4 in (1.93 m)	—	So
G		Prince Stewart	5 ft 10 in (1.78 m)	—	Fr
		Keith Manuel	6 ft 9 in (2.06 m)	—	So
G		Mark McCall	6 ft 2 in (1.88 m)	—	Fr
		Sean Harris	6 ft 8 in (2.03 m)	—	Fr
G		Shelton Boykin	6 ft 5 in (1.96 m)	—	Fr

Head coach

- Don Haskins

Assistant coach(es)

Legend

- (C) Team captain
- (S) Suspended
- (I) Ineligible
- (W) Walk-on
- Injured
- Current redshirt

== Schedule and results ==
Date time, TV	Rank^{#}	Opponent^{#}	Result	Record	Site city, state
Non-conference Regular season
Nov 16, 1987*		Simon Fraser	W 88–74	1–0	Special Events Center (7,200); El Paso, Texas
Nov 28, 1987*		St. Mary's	W 59–46	2–0	Special Events Center (7,556); El Paso, Texas
Dec 4, 1987*		Northern Illinois; UTEP Metromobile Invitational	W 67–55	3–0	Special Events Center (7,251); El Paso, Texas
Dec 5, 1987*		Howard; UTEP Metromobile Invitational	W 73–56	4–0	Special Events Center (9,524); El Paso, Texas
Dec 7, 1987*		New Mexico State	W 68–63	5–0	Special Events Center (11,193); El Paso, Texas
Dec 9, 1987*		vs. Morehead State; TCBY Classic	W 83–52	6–0	Barton Coliseum (2,400); Little Rock, Arkansas
Dec 10, 1987*		at Arkansas-Little Rock; TCBY Classic	L 65–68	6–1	Barton Coliseum (2,800); Little Rock, Arkansas
Dec 12, 1987*		at New Mexico State	L 57–58	6–2	Pan American Center (12,947); Las Cruces, New Mexico
Dec 17, 1987*		Lamar	W 87–56	7–2	Special Events Center (9,324); El Paso, Texas
Dec 21, 1987*		Rider	W 84–74	8–2	Special Events Center (8,210); El Paso, Texas
Dec 28, 1987*		Boston College; Sun Carnival Classic Tournament	W 93–60	9–2	Special Events Center (10,562); El Paso, Texas
Dec 29, 1987*		Alabama-Birmingham; Sun Carnival Classic Tournament	W 72–58	10–2	Special Events Center (11,287); El Paso, Texas
Dec 31, 1987*		Texas State	W 88–68	11–2	Special Events Center (7,150); El Paso, Texas
WAC Regular season
Jan 8, 1988		No. 5 Wyoming	W 68–62	12–2 (1–0)	Special Events Center (12,222); El Paso, Texas
Jan 9, 1988		Air Force	W 71–45	13–2 (2–0)	Special Events Center (11,821); El Paso, Texas
Jan 14, 1988		at Hawaii	W 69–64	14–2 (3–0)	Neal S. Blaisdell Center (1,473); Honolulu, Hawaii
Jan 16, 1988		at San Diego State	W 75–53	15–2 (4–0)	San Diego Sports Arena (4,077); San Diego, California
Jan 21, 1988	No. 18	No. 12 BYU	L 71–81	15–3 (4–1)	Special Events Center (12,222); El Paso, Texas
Jan 23, 1988	No. 18	Utah	W 56–53	16–3 (5–1)	Special Events Center (12,222); El Paso, Texas
Jan 28, 1988	No. 18	Colorado State	W 53–51	17–3 (6–1)	Special Events Center (11,624); El Paso, Texas
Jan 30, 1988	No. 18	New Mexico	L 69–70	17–4 (6–2)	Special Events Center (12,222); El Paso, Texas
Feb 4, 1988		at Wyoming	L 59–73	17–5 (6–3)	Arena-Auditorium (12,337); Laramie, Wyoming
Feb 6, 1988		at Colorado State	L 63–77	17–6 (6–4)	Moby Arena (7,219); Fort Collins, Colorado
Feb 12, 1988		Hawaii	W 65–48	18–6 (7–4)	Special Events Center (10,349); El Paso, Texas
Feb 13, 1988		San Diego State	W 68–61	19–6 (8–4)	Special Events Center (11,620); El Paso, Texas
Feb 20, 1988		at Air Force	W 72–66	20–6 (9–4)	Clune Arena (3,104); Colorado Springs, Colorado
Feb 26, 1988		at New Mexico	L 63–74	20–7 (9–5)	The Pit (18,100); Albuquerque, New Mexico
Mar 3, 1988		at Utah	L 55–66	20–8 (9–6)	Jon M. Huntsman Center (10,105); Salt Lake City, Utah
Mar 5, 1988		at No. 15 BYU	W 83–80 ^{OT}	21–8 (10–6)	Marriott Center (22,721); Provo, Utah
WAC tournament
Mar 10, 1988*	(4)	vs. (5) New Mexico; Quarterfinals	W 74–61	22–8	Marriott Center (15,603); Provo, Utah
Mar 11, 1988*	(4)	at (1) No. 17 BYU; Semifinals	W 66–63	23–8	Marriott Center (16,032); Provo, Utah
Mar 12, 1988*	(4)	vs. (2) No. 14 Wyoming; Championship	L 75–79	23–9	Marriott Center (15,174); Provo, Utah
NCAA tournament
Mar 18, 1988*	(9 W)	vs. (8 W) Seton Hall; First Round	L 64–80	23–10	Pauley Pavilion (10,741); Los Angeles, California
*Non-conference game. ^{#}Rankings from AP Poll. (#) Tournament seedings in parentheses. W=West.
