= 1987–88 BYU Cougars men's basketball team =

American college basketball season

1987–88 BYU Cougars men's basketball

WAC Regular season champions

NCAA tournament, second round
- Conference: Western Athletic Conference

Ranking
- AP: No. 19
- Record: 26–6 (13–3 WAC)
- Head coach: LaDell Andersen (5th season)
- Home arena: Marriott Center

1987–88 WAC men's basketball standings
	Conf.				Overall
Team	W		L	PCT	W		L	PCT
No. 19 BYU	13	–	3	.813	26	–	6	.813
No. 13 Wyoming †	11	–	5	.688	26	–	6	.813
Utah	11	–	5	.688	19	–	11	.633
UTEP	10	–	6	.625	23	–	10	.697
New Mexico	8	–	8	.500	22	–	14	.611
Colorado State	8	–	8	.500	22	–	13	.629
San Diego State	5	–	11	.313	12	–	17	.414
Air Force	4	–	12	.250	11	–	17	.393
Hawaii	2	–	14	.125	4	–	25	.138
† 1988 WAC tournament winner Rankings from AP poll

The 1987–88 BYU Cougars men's basketball team represented Brigham Young University as a member of the Western Athletic Conference during the 1987–88 basketball season. Led by head coach LaDell Andersen, the Cougars compiled a record of 26–6 (13–3 WAC) to finish atop the WAC regular season standings. The team played their home games at the Marriott Center in Provo, Utah, and took an unblemished record at home into the regular season finale (15–0) before losing to UTEP. BYU opened the season with 17 consecutive victories and rose to No. 3 in the AP poll. The Cougars received an at-large bid to the NCAA tournament. In the opening round, BYU defeated UNC Charlotte in overtime before losing to No. 5 seed Louisville in the round of 32, 97–76.

== Roster ==
1987–88 BYU Cougars men's basketball team
Players
Coaches

Pos.	#	Name	Height	Weight	Year	Hometown
F	4	Michael Smith	6 ft 10 in (2.08 m)	220 lb (100 kg)	Jr	Hacienda Heights, California
G	11	Marty Haws	6 ft 2 in (1.88 m)	165 lb (75 kg)	So	Midvale, Utah
G	13	Andy Toolson	6 ft 6 in (1.98 m)	205 lb (93 kg)	So	Twin Falls, Idaho
G	14	Brian Taylor	6 ft 5 in (1.96 m)	195 lb (88 kg)	Sr	Kaysville, Utah
G	23	Nathan Call	6 ft 0 in (1.83 m)	185 lb (84 kg)	So	Mission Viejo, California
F	24	Jeff Chatman	6 ft 6 in (1.98 m)	230 lb (104 kg)	Sr	Talladega, Alabama
F	25	Mike Herring	6 ft 5 in (1.96 m)	—	Fr	Mission Viejo, California
G	32	Chris Lynch	6 ft 5 in (1.96 m)	—	Fr	Seattle, Washington
F	33	Vince Bryan	6 ft 7 in (2.01 m)	—	Fr	Irvine, California
C	34	Gary Trost	6 ft 10 in (2.08 m)	—	Fr	Salt Lake City, Utah
F	40	Mark Clausen	6 ft 9 in (2.06 m)	—	Fr	Windsor, California
F	44	Alan Astle	6 ft 7 in (2.01 m)	—	Jr	Sacramento, California
F	50	David Wolfe	6 ft 9 in (2.06 m)	—	Fr	Pomona, California
C	52	Jim Usevitch	6 ft 9 in (2.06 m)	—	Sr	Huntington Beach, California

Head coach

- LaDell Andersen

Assistant coach(es)

Legend

- (C) Team captain
- (S) Suspended
- (I) Ineligible
- (W) Walk-on
- Injured
- Current redshirt

Roster

== Schedule and results ==
Date time, TV	Rank^{#}	Opponent^{#}	Result	Record	Site city, state
Regular Season
Nov 27, 1987*		Montana State	W 90–89	1–0	Marriott Center; Provo, Utah
Dec 1, 1987*		at Utah State	W 96–92	2–0	Dee Glen Smith Spectrum; Logan, Utah
Dec 3, 1987*		at Washington State	W 60–54	3–0	Friel Court; Pullman, Washington
Dec 5, 1987*		at UCLA	W 87–80	4–0	Pauley Pavilion; Los Angeles, California
Dec 11, 1987*		Weber State	W 104–71	5–0	Marriott Center; Provo, Utah
Dec 12, 1987*		Chicago State	W 91–60	6–0	Marriott Center; Provo, Utah
Dec 19, 1987*		Utah State	W 121–112	7–0	Marriott Center; Provo, Utah
Dec 29, 1987*		La Salle	W 95–82	8–0	Marriott Center; Provo, Utah
Jan 2, 1988*		Central Connecticut State	W 109–76	9–0	Marriott Center; Provo, Utah
Jan 7, 1988		Hawaii	W 97–66	10–0 (1–0)	Marriott Center; Provo, Utah
Jan 9, 1988		San Diego State	W 92–65	11–0 (2–0)	Marriott Center; Provo, Utah
Jan 15, 1988		at No. 12 Wyoming	W 83–67	12–0 (3–0)	Arena-Auditorium; Laramie, Wyoming
Jan 21, 1988	No. 12	at No. 18 UTEP	W 81–71	13–0 (4–0)	Special Events Center; El Paso, Texas
Jan 23, 1988	No. 12	at New Mexico	W 89–82	14–0 (5–0)	The Pit; Albuquerque, New Mexico
Jan 29, 1988	No. 7	Air Force	W 95–75	15–0 (6–0)	Marriott Center; Provo, Utah
Feb 1, 1988*	No. 3	Tulsa	W 72–57	16–0	Marriott Center; Provo, Utah
Feb 4, 1988	No. 3	Utah	W 82–64	17–0 (7–0)	Marriott Center; Provo, Utah
Feb 6, 1988*	No. 3	at Alabama-Birmingham	L 83–102	17–1	Birmingham-Jefferson Civic Center; Birmingham, Alabama
Feb 9, 1988*	No. 8	Miami (FL)	W 99–86	18–1	Marriott Center; Provo, Utah
Feb 12, 1988	No. 8	No. 18 Wyoming	W 78–69	19–1 (8–0)	Marriott Center; Provo, Utah
Feb 13, 1988*	No. 8	Colorado State	W 86–80	20–1 (9–0)	Marriott Center; Provo, Utah
Feb 18, 1988	No. 7	at San Diego State	L 80–82	20–2 (9–1)	San Diego Sports Arena; San Diego, California
Feb 20, 1988	No. 7	at Hawaii	W 72–70	21–2 (10–1)	Neal S. Blaisdell Center; Honolulu, Hawaii
Feb 23, 1988	No. 11	at Colorado State	W 75–67	22–2 (11–1)	Moby Arena; Fort Collins, Colorado
Feb 25, 1988	No. 11	at Air Force	W 76–62	23–2 (12–1)	Clune Arena; Colorado Springs, Colorado
Feb 27, 1988	No. 11	at Utah	L 60–62	23–3 (12–2)	Jon M. Huntsman Center; Salt Lake City, Utah
Mar 3, 1988	No. 15	New Mexico	W 89–82	24–3 (13–2)	Marriott Center; Provo, Utah
Mar 5, 1988	No. 15	UTEP	L 80–83	24–4 (13–3)	Marriott Center; Provo, Utah
WAC Tournament
Mar 10, 1988*	(1) No. 17	(9) Hawaii; Quarterfinals	W 76–74	25–4	Marriott Center; Provo, Utah
Mar 11, 1988*	(1) No. 17	(4) UTEP; Semifinals	L 63–66	25–5	Marriott Center; Provo, Utah
NCAA Tournament
Mar 17, 1988*	(4 SE) No. 19	vs. (13 SE) UNC Charlotte; First round	W 98–92 ^{OT}	26–5	The Omni; Atlanta, Georgia
Mar 19, 1988*	(4 SE) No. 19	vs. (5 SE) Louisville; Second round	L 76–97	26–6	The Omni; Atlanta, Georgia
*Non-conference game. ^{#}Rankings from AP Poll. (#) Tournament seedings in parentheses. SE=Southeast.
