= 1988 WAC men's basketball tournament =

- Classification: Division I
- Season: 1987–88
- Teams: 9
- Site: Marriott Center; Provo, UT
- Champions: Wyoming (2nd title)
- Winning coach: Benny Dees (1st title)
- MVP: Eric Leckner (Wyoming)

1987–88 WAC men's basketball standings
| | Conf. | | | | Overall |
| Team | W | | L | PCT | W | | L | PCT |
|---|---|---|---|---|---|---|---|---|
| No. 19 BYU | 13 | – | 3 | .813 | 26 | – | 6 | .813 |
| No. 13 Wyoming † | 11 | – | 5 | .688 | 26 | – | 6 | .813 |
| Utah | 11 | – | 5 | .688 | 19 | – | 11 | .633 |
| UTEP | 10 | – | 6 | .625 | 23 | – | 10 | .697 |
| New Mexico | 8 | – | 8 | .500 | 22 | – | 14 | .611 |
| Colorado State | 8 | – | 8 | .500 | 22 | – | 13 | .629 |
| San Diego State | 5 | – | 11 | .313 | 12 | – | 17 | .414 |
| Air Force | 4 | – | 12 | .250 | 11 | – | 17 | .393 |
| Hawaii | 2 | – | 14 | .125 | 4 | – | 25 | .138 |
† 1988 WAC tournament winner Rankings from AP poll

The 1988 Western Athletic Conference men's basketball tournament was held March 9–12 at the Marriott Center at Brigham Young University in Provo, Utah.

Wyoming defeated UTEP in the championship game, 79–75, to clinch their second overall, as well as second consecutive, WAC men's tournament championship

The Cowboys, in turn, received an automatic bid to the 1988 NCAA tournament. They were joined in the tournament by BYU and UTEP, both of whom received at-large bids.

== Format ==
The tournament field remained fixed at nine teams, and teams were again seeded based on regular season conference records. All teams were entered into the quarterfinal round with the exception of the two lowest-seeded teams, who played in the preliminary first round to determine who would then play against the tournament's top seed. Once again, the whole tournament was hosted by the regular season champion.

== Bracket ==
First round Wednesday, March 9
9 | Hawaii | 84
8 | Air Force | 76

Quarterfinals; Thursday, March 10
1 | #17 BYU | 76
9 | Hawaii | 74
5 | New Mexico | 61
4 | UTEP | 74
3 | Utah | 68
6 | Colorado State | 78
7 | San Diego State | 76
2 | #14 Wyoming | 83

Semifinals; Friday, March 11
1 | #17 BYU | 63
4 | UTEP | 66
6 | Colorado State | 58
2 | #14 Wyoming | 60

Championship; Saturday, March 12
4 | UTEP | 75
2 | #14 Wyoming | 79
