= Cholla High School =

School in Tucson, Arizona

Cholla High Magnet School

Location
- 2001 West Starr Pass Boulevard; Tucson, Arizona 85713; United States; 32°12′21″N 111°00′37″W

Information
- Type: Public secondary (U.S.)
- Established: 1969 (57 years ago)
- Oversight: Tucson Unified School District
- CEEB code: 030478
- Teaching staff: 99.40 (FTE)
- Grades: 9–12
- Enrollment: 1,668 (2023-2024)
- Student to teacher ratio: 16.78
- Campus type: Urban
- Colors: Orange and navy blue
- Mascot: Charger
- Yearbook: Impact
- Website: chollahs.tusd1.org

Cholla High School (also known as Cholla High Magnet School) is a public high school, located on the West Side of Tucson, Arizona, United States. Cholla is a magnet high school (drawing students from the entire district) in the Tucson Unified School District and serves over 1,700, students, grades 9–12. The school name originates from the cholla cactus, which is prominent throughout Tucson and Arizona. The school mascot is the Charger (a medieval war horse) and the school colors are orange and blue.

== School history ==
Opened in 1969 on the west side of Tucson, constructed by the Del E. Webb Corporation. Cholla High Magnet School has become widely known as the high school that former San Antonio Spurs Sean Elliott attended before enrolling at the University of Arizona. The school's gymnasium has since been renamed the "Sean Elliott Gymnasium", and Elliott's high school jerseys grace the walls.

== Academics ==
Cholla's specialties include The Global Village (an intercultural / international and law-related studies program), an English Language development program, parent support groups, social workers, Gifted and Talented Education (GATE) program, honors programs, career counseling, student assistance programs, International Baccalaureate (Biology, Chemistry, Environmental Science, Math, History, English, Spanish, German, Arabic, Visual art, Theatre, Music, Psychology), Advanced Placement (Human Geography, World History, Computer Science), English honors programs, the QUICC Program (Quality Instruction in a Continuous Curriculum), ASSIST Program, music theory, folklorico, mariachi programs and ethnic studies programs.

== Athletics ==
Cholla presently competes in the 4A Gila Conference, Division I.

== Notable alumni ==
- Sean Elliott (1985): former professional NBA basketball player
- Vance Johnson (1981): former NFL football star for the Denver Broncos
- Mike Scurlock: former NFL player (St. Louis Rams, Carolina Panthers)
- Ajak Magot: former Idaho State basketball player and current professional player for Arino Basket Termoli Italy
- Mel Stocker: former MLB player (Milwaukee Brewers)
- David Tineo: artist, teacher, political activist
