= Sean Elliott =

American basketball player (born 1968)

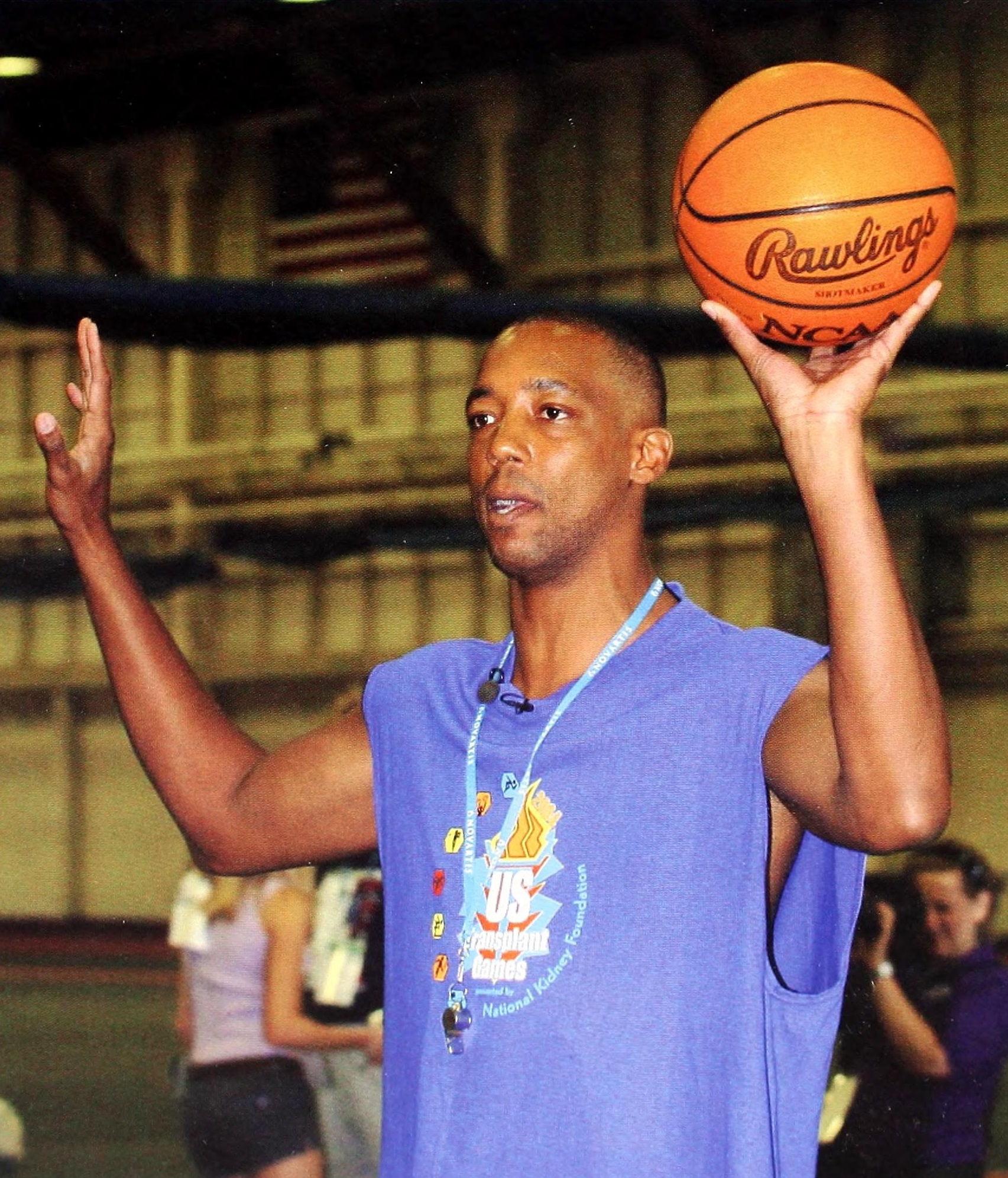
- Elliott in 2008

Personal information
- Born: February 2, 1968 (age 58) Tucson, Arizona, U.S.
- Listed height: 6 ft 8 in (2.03 m)
- Listed weight: 220 lb (100 kg)

Career information
- High school: Cholla (Tucson, Arizona)
- College: Arizona (1985–1989)
- NBA draft: 1989: 1st round, 3rd overall pick
- Drafted by: San Antonio Spurs
- Playing career: 1989–2001
- Position: Small forward
- Number: 32

Career history
- 1989–1993: San Antonio Spurs
- 1993–1994: Detroit Pistons
- 1994–2001: San Antonio Spurs

Career highlights
- NBA champion (1999); 2× NBA All-Star (1993, 1996); NBA All-Rookie Second Team (1990); No. 32 retired by San Antonio Spurs; John R. Wooden Award (1989); Adolph Rupp Trophy (1989); NABC Player of the Year (1989); AP Player of the Year (1989); 2× Consensus first-team All-American (1988, 1989); 2× Pac-10 Player of the Year (1988, 1989); 3× First-team All-Pac-10 (1987–1989); 2× Pac-10 tournament MVP (1988, 1989); Pac-10 Freshman of the Year (1986); No. 32 retired by Arizona Wildcats; McDonald's All-American (1985)

Career NBA statistics
- Points: 10,544 (14.2 ppg)
- Rebounds: 3,204 (4.3 rpg)
- Assists: 1,897 (2.6 apg)
- Stats at NBA.com
- Stats at Basketball Reference
- Collegiate Basketball Hall of Fame
Medals
Men's basketball
Representing United States
FIBA World Championship
Gold medal – first place	1986 Spain	National team
Summer Universiade
Silver medal – second place	1987 Zagreb	National team

Sean Michael Elliott (born February 2, 1968) is an American former professional basketball player who played as a small forward in both the college and professional ranks. He attended the University of Arizona, where he had a standout career as a two-time All-American, winner of the 1989 John R. Wooden Award, the 1989 Adolph Rupp Trophy, the 1989 NABC Player of the Year, 1989 AP Player of the Year, and two-time Pac-12 Player of the Year (in 1988–1989).

Elliott was the third pick of the 1989 NBA draft, was named to the 1990 NBA All-Rookie Second Team, was a two-time NBA All-Star, and earned an NBA championship in 1999. His No. 32 is retired by both the University of Arizona and the San Antonio Spurs.

== Early life ==
Elliott was born in Tucson, Arizona, as the youngest of three boys. He attended the G.A.T.E. (Gifted and Talented Education) program at Tolson Elementary School there, then played basketball at Cholla High School (now Cholla High Magnet School) on the city's west side.

As a sophomore, Elliott averaged 16.5 points and 11 rebounds on the junior varsity team. His junior season, he led the varsity team to a state playoff berth averaging 18.9 points and 9.6 rebounds per game. He received many accolades for his season performance, including first team all-state by the Arizona Daily Star and second team class AAA all-state by the Arizona Republic. He was also the leading vote receiver in for the all area team by the Tucson Citizen and Arizona Daily Star.

As a senior, Elliott led Cholla to the state semifinals, averaging a state-high 32.2 points per game which broke the state class AAA scoring record set by Dennis Dairman. He also averaged 14 rebounds and 4 assists per game. He was a consensus first team all-state selection and named co-player of the year along with Mitch Smith. He was chosen to the all-American teams by Scholastic Coach Magazine, National High School Coaches Association, and Converse. He was named to the McDonald's All-America team but was unable to play in the game due a wrist injury.

In the fall of his senior year, Elliott committed to play basketball for the Wildcats of the University of Arizona over offers from Texas, San Diego St., New Mexico St., Arizona St., UTEP, Northern Arizona, Iowa, and Maryland. He was rated the #62 ranked recruit in the country and was the first Tucson recruit of head coach Lute Olsen's tenure.

Elliott also participated in track and field in the high jump.

== College career ==
Elliott was named Pac-10 Freshman of the Year. He was selected as a consensus all-American during his junior and senior years, and led the Wildcats to the Final Four in his junior year (1988). Elliott broke Lew Alcindor's (Kareem Abdul-Jabbar) all time Pac-10 career scoring record. After an exceptional senior season, Elliott won the Wooden Award. He is still the University of Arizona's all-time leading scorer.

Elliott played for the US national team in the 1986 FIBA World Championship, winning the gold medal.

== NBA career ==
=== San Antonio Spurs (1989–1993) ===
Elliott was drafted by the San Antonio Spurs as the third pick in the first round of the 1989 NBA draft. Elliot started in 69 of 81 games for the season and averaged 10 points a game. The Spurs made the playoffs where they swept the Denver Nuggets in the first round before falling to the eventual Western Conference Champion Portland Trail Blazers in 7 games.

In the following season, Elliott was moved to the permanent starting line-up and increased his scoring to 15.9 points a game. The Spurs won 55 games but lost in the first round of the playoffs to the Golden State Warriors in four games. Elliott averaged 16.3 points per game during the 1991–92 season but San Antonio were swept in the first round by the Phoenix Suns.

During the 1992–93 season, Elliott averaged 17.2 points per game, including a career-high 41 points against the Dallas Mavericks on December 18, 1992. He was named to play in the 1993 NBA All-Star Game alongside teammate David Robinson. In the playoffs, San Antonio defeated Portland 3 games to 1, before facing the number one seeded Suns in the conference semifinal. After losing the first two games in Phoenix, the Spurs responded with consecutive games at home, as Elliott scored 17 points in game 3 and 19 points in game 4. The Suns managed to wrap up the series in the next two games. Elliot averaged 15.8 points per game in the playoffs.

=== Detroit Pistons (1993–1994) ===
Elliott spent the 1993–94 season with the Detroit Pistons after being traded for Dennis Rodman in a multi-player deal. After Elliott struggled with the Pistons, the Pistons attempted to trade him to the eventual champion Houston Rockets in February 1994 in exchange for Robert Horry, Matt Bullard and two second-round draft choices; the trade fell through when Elliott failed his physical. After the trade was voided, Elliott held a press conference and announced that he had a kidney problem. Elliott remained in Detroit for the rest of the season and averaged 12.1 points per game. Following the end of the season, he was traded back to the Spurs for the draft rights of Bill Curley.

=== Return to San Antonio Spurs (1994–1998) ===
In the 1994–1995 season, the Spurs won 62 games under the leadership of Elliott and the season's NBA Most Valuable Player Robinson. The Spurs clinched the top seed in the Western Conference, and swept the Denver Nuggets in the first round before facing the young Los Angeles Lakers in the semifinals. Elliott scored 26 points – his high for the playoffs – in the series-clinching game against the Lakers. The Spurs lost to the Houston Rockets in the conference finals.

The 1995–1996 season was a personal best for Elliott, as he averaged 20 points a game, a career high, in 77 games. Elliott also made a career-high 161 three-pointers on the season. He played in the 1996 NBA All-Star Game and scored 13 points. The following season, Elliott suffered injuries that limited him to 39 games. Injuries limited him again to just 36 games in the 1997–1998 season.

=== NBA championship, kidney transplant, and comeback (1998–2001) ===
The 1998–1999 season was shortened to 50 games as a result of a league lockout, but the Spurs won 37 of the games for the west's best record led by Duncan and Robinson, with Elliott starting in all 50 games with an average of 11.2 points a game. The Spurs defeated the Minnesota Timberwolves and Los Angeles Lakers to face the Portland Trail Blazers in the conference finals. During game 2, the Trail Blazers held a 2-point lead with 9 seconds left to play in regulation. Elliott received a pass nearly stolen by Blazer Stacey Augmon in the corner, before Elliott caught the ball within an inch of the sideline. He managed to stay on his tiptoes rather than planting his feet, before releasing a 21-foot three-point attempt just over the outstretched arms of 6 foot 11 forward Rasheed Wallace. The shot went in, giving the Spurs a 1-point lead and the eventual victory. The shot was named the "Memorial Day Miracle" because of its improbability and the date on which it was made. Elliott finished the game with 22 points. The Spurs made the NBA Finals and faced the New York Knicks. The Spurs defeated the Knicks in five games to win their first NBA Championship. Elliott averaged 11.9 points in 17 games in the playoffs while shooting 40 percent from beyond the three-point arc.

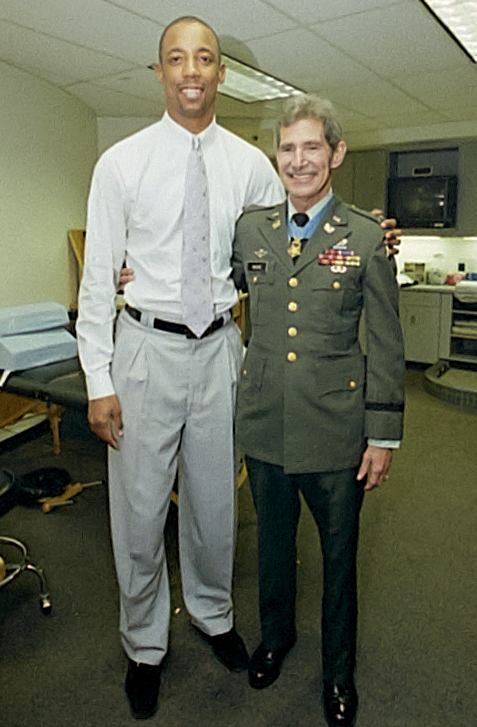
Elliott (left) at the Alamodome in March 2000

Shortly after the championship run, Elliott announced that he had a kidney disease known as focal segmental glomerulosclerosis, that his kidney function was worsening, and that he would require a transplant as soon as a matching donor became available. He underwent kidney transplant surgery on August 16, 1999, receiving a kidney from his older brother, Noel.

On March 13, 2000, in a game against the Atlanta Hawks, Elliott became the first professional athlete to return to his sport after a kidney transplant. He played in only 19 games in the 1999–2000 season. Elliott started in 34 of 52 games in the 2000–2001 season; the Spurs held the best record in the league, but lost to the eventual champion Los Angeles Lakers in the Western Conference Finals.

=== Retirement ===
Elliott announced his retirement in 2001. He finished his career averaging 14.2 points, 4.3 rebounds, and 2.6 assists per game.

== Career statistics ==
Legend
GP	Games played	GS	Games started	MPG	Minutes per game
FG%	Field goal percentage	3P%	3-point field goal percentage	FT%	Free throw percentage
RPG	Rebounds per game	APG	Assists per game	SPG	Steals per game
BPG	Blocks per game	PPG	Points per game	**Bold**	Career high
†	Won an NBA championship	*	Led the league

=== NCAA statistics ===
Year	Team	GP	GS	MPG	FG%	3P%	FT%	RPG	APG	SPG	BPG	PPG
1985–86	Arizona	32	...	33.7	.486	...	.749	5.3	2.2	0.7	0.3	15.6
1986–87	Arizona	30	...	34.9	.510	.371	.770	6.0	3.7	0.7	0.2	19.3
1987–88	Arizona	**38**	...	32.9	**.570**	.471	.793	5.8	3.6	0.7	**0.4**	19.6
1988–89	Arizona	33	...	**34.1**	.480	**.504**	**.841**	**7.2**	**4.1**	**1.0**	0.3	**22.3**
**Career**	...	133	...	33.8	.512	.456	.793	6.1	3.4	0.8	0.3	19.2

=== NBA ===
==== Regular season statistics ====
Year	Team	GP	GS	MPG	FG%	3P%	FT%	RPG	APG	SPG	BPG	PPG
1989–90	San Antonio	81	69	25.1	.481	.111	**.866**	3.7	1.9	0.6	0.2	10.0
1990–91	San Antonio	**82**	**82**	37.1	.490	.313	.808	**5.6**	2.9	0.8	0.4	15.9
1991–92	San Antonio	**82**	**82**	**38.0**	**.494**	.305	.861	5.4	2.6	**1.0**	0.4	16.3
1992–93	San Antonio	70	70	37.2	.491	.356	.798	4.6	**3.8**	**1.0**	0.4	17.2
1993–94	Detroit	73	73	33.0	.455	.299	.803	3.6	2.7	0.7	0.4	12.1
1994–95	San Antonio	81	81	35.3	.468	.408	.807	3.5	2.5	**1.0**	0.5	18.1
1995–96	San Antonio	77	77	37.7	.466	.411	.771	5.1	2.7	0.9	0.4	**20.0**
1996–97	San Antonio	39	39	35.7	.422	.333	.755	4.9	3.2	0.6	**0.6**	14.9
1997–98	San Antonio	36	36	28.1	.403	.378	.718	3.4	1.7	0.7	0.4	9.3
1998–99†	San Antonio	50*	50*	30.2	.410	.328	.757	4.3	2.3	0.5	0.3	11.2
1999–2000	San Antonio	19	19	20.6	.358	.351	.781	2.5	1.5	0.6	0.1	6.0
2000–01	San Antonio	52	34	23.6	.434	**.426**	.714	3.3	1.6	0.4	0.5	7.9
Career		742	712	33.0	.465	.375	.800	4.3	2.6	0.8	0.4	14.2
All-Star		2	0	18.5	.333	.333	.800	3.5	1.0	0.0	0.0	9.0

==== Playoff statistics ====
Year	Team	GP	GS	MPG	FG%	3P%	FT%	RPG	APG	SPG	BPG	PPG
1990	San Antonio	10	10	29.1	**.552**	.000	.724	4.1	1.8	0.9	0.6	12.7
1991	San Antonio	4	4	33.0	.425	.000	.781	**5.5**	**4.0**	1.0	0.3	14.8
1992	San Antonio	3	3	**45.7**	.475	**.625**	.889	4.3	2.7	1.0	**1.3**	**19.7**
1993	San Antonio	10	10	38.1	.472	.214	.925	4.8	3.6	0.8	0.3	15.8
1995	San Antonio	15	15	38.3	.435	.364	.776	4.8	2.7	0.7	0.5	17.3
1996	San Antonio	10	10	38.9	.402	.294	.797	3.9	2.5	**1.1**	0.4	15.5
1999†	San Antonio	**17**	**17**	33.8	.444	.400	.763	3.4	2.6	0.5	0.2	11.9
2000	San Antonio	4	4	29.8	.375	.385	.625	**5.5**	1.3	0.0	0.5	10.0
2001	San Antonio	12	0	19.9	.373	.364	**1.000**	2.2	1.2	0.4	0.5	4.8
Career		85	73	33.4	.445	.356	.801	4.0	2.4	0.7	0.4	13.2

== Post-NBA endeavors ==
After retiring, Elliott became a basketball analyst for The NBA on NBC and, during the 2003–2004 season, for ABC Sports and ESPN. He left that position for the 2004–2005 season and became the color commentator for the Spurs' local broadcasts. On January 5, 2013, he joined Fox Sports 1, calling his first college basketball game with the network.

On March 6, 2005, his #32 was retired by the San Antonio Spurs and was hung in the rafters of the AT&T Center. His #32 is also retired by the University of Arizona.
