= 1987–88 Oregon State Beavers men's basketball team =

American college basketball season

1987–88 Oregon State Beavers men's basketball

Far West Classic Champions

NCAA tournament, first round
- Conference: Pac-10 Conference
- Record: 20–11 (12–6 Pac 10)
- Head coach: Ralph Miller (18th season)
- Home arena: Gill Coliseum

1987–88 Pacific-10 Conference men's basketball standings
	Conf.				Overall
Team	W		L	PCT	W		L	PCT
No. 2 Arizona †	17	–	1	.944	35	–	3	.921
Oregon State	12	–	6	.667	20	–	11	.645
UCLA	12	–	6	.667	16	–	14	.533
Stanford	11	–	7	.611	21	–	12	.636
Oregon	10	–	8	.556	16	–	14	.533
Washington State	7	–	11	.389	13	–	16	.448
Arizona State	6	–	12	.333	13	–	16	.448
USC	5	–	13	.278	7	–	21	.250
California	5	–	13	.278	9	–	20	.310
Washington	5	–	13	.278	10	–	19	.345
† Conference tournament winner As of April 15, 1988; Rankings from AP Poll

The 1987–88 Oregon State Beavers men's basketball team represented Oregon State University in Corvallis, Oregon in the 1987–88 season.

Led by Ralph Miller in his 18th season at Oregon State, the Beavers finished with a record of 20–11 (12–6 Pac-10). They were invited to the NCAA tournament, where they lost in the first round to Louisville.

== Roster ==
1987–88 Oregon State Beavers men's basketball team
Players
Coaches

Pos.	#	Name	Height	Weight	Year	Previous school	Hometown
G	15	Eric Knox	6 ft 2 in (1.88 m)	—	Jr
G	20	Gary Payton	6 ft 3 in (1.91 m)	175 lb (79 kg)	So	Skyline HS	Oakland, California
F	24	Earl Martin	6 ft 5 in (1.96 m)	—	So

Head coach

- Ralph Miller (Kansas)

Assistant coach(es)

Legend

- (C) Team captain
- (S) Suspended
- (I) Ineligible
- (W) Walk-on
- Injured
- Current redshirt

== Schedule and results ==
Date time, TV	Rank^{#}	Opponent^{#}	Result	Record	Site (attendance) city, state
Non-conference regular season
Nov 27, 1987*		vs. Clemson	L 54–69	0–1	Chinese Culture and Sports Center; Taipei, Taiwan
Dec 3, 1987*		at UC-Santa Barbara	L 70–71	0–2	The Thunderdome; Santa Barbara, CA
Dec 5, 1987*		vs. Portland	W 74–62	1–2	
Dec 9, 1987*		Loyola Marymount	W 84–69	2–2	Gill Coliseum; Corvallis, OR
Dec 12, 1987*		U.S. International	W 85–57	3–2	Gill Coliseum; Corvallis, OR
Dec 19, 1987*		Wichita State	L 57–60	3–3	Gill Coliseum; Corvallis, OR
Dec 26, 1987*		vs. TCU; Far West Classic	W 63–49	4–3	Portland, OR
Dec 27, 1987*		vs. Lamar; Far West Classic	W 62–44	5–3	Portland, OR
Dec 28, 1987*		vs. Oregon; Far West Classic	W 62–51	6–3	Portland, OR
Pac-10 regular season
Jan 7, 1988		at UCLA	W 65–64	7–3 (1–0)	Pauley Pavilion (7,721); Los Angeles, CA
Jan 9, 1988		at USC	W 80–77	8–3 (2–0)	L.A. Sports Arena; Los Angeles, CA
Jan 14, 1988		No. 1 Arizona	L 48–70	8–4 (2–1)	Gill Coliseum; Corvallis, OR
Jan 16, 1988		Arizona State	W 76–68	9–4 (3–1)	Gill Coliseum; Corvallis, OR
Jan 21, 1988		at Washington	L 59–63	9–5 (3–2)	Bank of America Arena; Seattle, WA
Jan 23, 1988		at Washington State	L 49–56	9–6 (3–3)	Friel Court; Pullman, WA
Jan 28, 1988		Stanford	L 65–78	9–7 (3–4)	Gill Coliseum; Corvallis, OR
Jan 30, 1988		California	W 82–46	10–7 (4–4)	Gill Coliseum; Corvallis, OR
Feb 4, 1988		USC	W 84–57	11–7 (5–4)	Gill Coliseum; Corvallis, OR
Feb 7, 1988		UCLA	W 73–68	12–7 (6–4)	Gill Coliseum (7,612); Corvallis, OR
Feb 11, 1988		at Arizona State	W 78–75	13–7 (7–4)	Wells Fargo Arena; Tempe, AZ
Feb 14, 1988		at No. 3 Arizona	L 62–77	13–8 (7–5)	McKale Center; Tucson, AZ
Feb 18, 1988		Washington State	W 62–48	14–8 (8–5)	Gill Coliseum; Corvallis, OR
Feb 20, 1988		Washington	W 69–57	15–8 (9–5)	Gill Coliseum; Corvallis, OR
Feb 25, 1988		at California	W 65–54	16–8 (10–5)	Harmon Gym; Berkeley, CA
Feb 27, 1988		at Stanford	W 63–61	17–8 (11–5)	Maples Pavilion; Stanford, CA
Mar 3, 1988		Oregon	W 59–47	18–8 (12–5)	Gill Coliseum; Corvallis, OR
Mar 5, 1988		at Oregon	L 61–62	18–9 (12–6)	McArthur Court; Eugene, OR
Pacific-10 tournament
Mar 11, 1988*; 7:00 p.m.	(2)	vs. Washington; Pac-10 tournament Quarterfinal	W 80–61	19–9	McKale Center (13,061); Tucson, AZ
Mar 12, 1988*; 3:00 p.m.	(2)	vs. Washington State; Pac-10 Tournament Semifinal	W 74–68 ^{2OT}	20–9	McKale Center (13,549); Tucson, AZ
Mar 13, 1988*	(2)	at (1) No. 3 Arizona; Pac-10 tournament championship	L 67–83	20–10	McKale Center; Tucson, AZ
NCAA tournament
Mar 17, 1988*	(12 SE)	vs. (5 SE) Louisville; First round	L 61–70	20–11	Omni Coliseum; Atlanta, GA
*Non-conference game. ^{#}Rankings from AP Poll. (#) Tournament seedings in parentheses.
