= 1987–88 Washington Huskies men's basketball team =

American college basketball season

1987–88 Washington Huskies men's basketball
- Conference: Pacific-10 Conference
- Record: 10–19 (5–13 Pac-10)
- Head coach: Andy Russo (3rd season)
- Home arena: Hec Edmundson Pavilion

1987–88 Pacific-10 Conference men's basketball standings
	Conf.				Overall
Team	W		L	PCT	W		L	PCT
No. 2 Arizona †	17	–	1	.944	35	–	3	.921
Oregon State	12	–	6	.667	20	–	11	.645
UCLA	12	–	6	.667	16	–	14	.533
Stanford	11	–	7	.611	21	–	12	.636
Oregon	10	–	8	.556	16	–	14	.533
Washington State	7	–	11	.389	13	–	16	.448
Arizona State	6	–	12	.333	13	–	16	.448
USC	5	–	13	.278	7	–	21	.250
California	5	–	13	.278	9	–	20	.310
Washington	5	–	13	.278	10	–	19	.345
† Conference tournament winner As of April 15, 1988; Rankings from AP Poll

The 1987–88 Washington Huskies men's basketball team represented the University of Washington for the 1987–88 NCAA Division I men's basketball season. Led by third-year head coach Andy Russo, the Huskies were members of the Pacific-10 Conference and played their home games on campus at Hec Edmundson Pavilion in Seattle, Washington.

The Huskies were 9–18 overall in the regular season and 5–13 in conference play, tied for last in the standings.

In the Pac-10 tournament at Tucson, Washington was seeded tenth and defeated seventh seed Arizona State by fourteen points in the opening round, then lost to second seed Oregon State by nineteen points in the quarterfinals.

== Postseason results ==
Date time, TV	Opponent	Result	Record	Site (attendance) city, state
Pacific-10 Tournament
Thu, March 10; 9:00 pm	vs. (7) Arizona State; First round	W 96–82	10–18	McKale Center (12,635); Tucson, Arizona
Fri, March 11; 7:00 pm	vs. (2) Oregon State; Quarterfinal	L 61–80	10–19	McKale Center (13,061); Tucson, Arizona
*Non-conference game. ^{#}Rankings from AP poll. (#) Tournament seedings in parentheses. All times are in Pacific time.
