= Benny Dees =

American basketball coach (1934–2021)

Biographical details
- Born: December 29, 1934; Mount Vernon, Georgia, U.S.
- Died: March 23, 2021 (aged 86)

Playing career

Basketball
- 1957–1958: Wyoming

Baseball
- c. 1958: Wyoming

Coaching career (HC unless noted)

Basketball
- 1962–1967: Abraham Baldwin Agricultural College
- 1968–1970: VCU
- 1970–1973: Western Kentucky (assistant)
- 1977–1979: Georgia Tech (assistant)
- 1979–1980: Georgia Tech {Women's HC}
- 1980–1985: Alabama (assistant)
- 1985–1987: New Orleans
- 1987–1993: Wyoming
- 1993–1995: Western Carolina

Head coaching record
- Overall: 197–144 (college)
- Tournaments: 1–2 (NCAA Division I); 1–1 (NIT)

Accomplishments and honors

Championships
- WAC tournament (1988)

Benny Dees (December 29, 1934 – March 23, 2021) was an American college basketball coach. He was head coach of the University of New Orleans Privateers team from 1985 to 1987, the University of Wyoming team from 1987 to 1993 and Western Carolina University from 1993 to 1995. Additionally, Dees served as assistant coach at Georgia Tech, Alabama, and Western Kentucky. In 1987, he led the University of New Orleans to their first NCAA Championship tournament, where they defeated BYU in the first round 83–79.

While attending college at the University of Wyoming, Dees lettered in basketball and baseball. He began his coaching career as head coach of Abraham Baldwin Agricultural College from 1962 to 1967. Dees subsequently became the first coach of VCU. Upon retirement, Dees returned to his native Georgia, where he coached high school basketball. He retired as head coach of the Toombs County High School boys' basketball team in 2010. Dees was married to Nancy Dees, who coached women's basketball at the University of West Georgia. Benny and Nancy Dees have one son, Josh Dees, who played basketball for the University of Wyoming and Western Carolina University and now serves as assistant coach at the College of Southern Idaho.

Dees died on March 23, 2021, at the age of 86.

== Head coaching record ==
=== College ===
Record table
Season	Team	Overall	Conference	Standing	Postseason
VCU Rams (Independent) (1968–1970)
1968–69	VCU	12–11			
1969–70	VCU	13–10			
VCU:		25–21 (.543)			
New Orleans Privateers (NCAA Division I independent) (1985–1987)
1985–86	New Orleans	16–12			
1986–87	New Orleans	26–4			NCAA Division I Second Round
New Orleans:		42–16 (.724)			
Wyoming Cowboys (Western Athletic Conference) (1987–1993)
1987–88	Wyoming	26–6	11–5	2nd	NCAA Division I First Round
1988–89	Wyoming	14–17	6–10	7th	
1989–90	Wyoming	15–14	7–9	7th	
1990–91	Wyoming	20–12	8–8	4th	NIT Second Round
1991–92	Wyoming	16–13	8–8	6th	
1992–93	Wyoming	13–15	7–11	8th	
Wyoming:		104–77 (.575)	47–51 (.480)		
Western Carolina Catamounts (Southern Conference) (1993–1995)
1993–94	Western Carolina	12–16	8–10	5th	
1994–95	Western Carolina	14–14	8–6	2nd	
Western Carolina:		26–30 (.464)	16–16 (.500)		
Total:		197–144 (.578)			
National champion Postseason invitational champion Conference regular season champion Conference regular season and conference tournament champion Division regular season champion Division regular season and conference tournament champion Conference tournament champion
