= 1987–88 Washington State Cougars men's basketball team =

American college basketball season

1987–88 Washington State Cougars men's basketball
- Conference: Pacific-10
- Record: 13–16 (7–11 Pac-10)
- Head coach: Kelvin Sampson (1st season)
- Assistant coaches: Dave Harshman; Kim Motta
- Home arena: Beasley Coliseum

1987–88 Pacific-10 Conference men's basketball standings
	Conf.				Overall
Team	W		L	PCT	W		L	PCT
No. 2 Arizona †	17	–	1	.944	35	–	3	.921
Oregon State	12	–	6	.667	20	–	11	.645
UCLA	12	–	6	.667	16	–	14	.533
Stanford	11	–	7	.611	21	–	12	.636
Oregon	10	–	8	.556	16	–	14	.533
Washington State	7	–	11	.389	13	–	16	.448
Arizona State	6	–	12	.333	13	–	16	.448
USC	5	–	13	.278	7	–	21	.250
California	5	–	13	.278	9	–	20	.310
Washington	5	–	13	.278	10	–	19	.345
† Conference tournament winner As of April 15, 1988; Rankings from AP Poll

The 1987–88 Washington State Cougars men's basketball team represented Washington State University for the 1987–88 NCAA Division I men's basketball season. Led by first-year head coach Kelvin Sampson, the Cougars were members of the Pacific-10 Conference and played their home games on campus at Beasley Coliseum in Pullman, Washington.

The Cougars were 12–15 overall in the regular season and 7–11 in conference play, sixth in the standings.

At the conference tournament's last quarterfinal, WSU upset third seed UCLA by two points. In the semifinal, the Cougars took second-seeded Oregon State to double overtime, but lost by six points.

Sampson was promoted to head coach in April 1987, and led the program for seven seasons.

== Roster ==
1987–88 Washington State Cougars men's basketball team
Players	Coaches
Pos. / # / Name / Height / Weight / Year / Hometown; F / / LaVar Ball / 6 ft 6 in (1.98 m) / 265 lb (120 kg) / Jr / California	Head coach: Kelvin Sampson; Assistant coach(es): Dave Harshman; Kim Motta; Legend: (C) Team captain; (S) Suspended; (I) Ineligible; (W) Walk-on; Injured; Current redshirt

== Season results ==
Date time, TV	Rank^{#}	Opponent^{#}	Result	Record	Site (attendance) city, state
Regular season
Fri, Nov 27, 1987*		vs. Eastern Washington	W 68–46	1–0	
Sat, Nov 28, 1987*		vs. Idaho	L 49–53	1–1	
Thu, Dec 3, 1987*		BYU	L 54–60	1–2	Friel Court; Pullman, Washington
Sat, Dec 5, 1987*		Fresno State	W 61–60	2–2	Friel Court; Pullman, Washington
Fri, Dec 11, 1987*		vs. Indiana State	W 73–61	3–2	
Sat, Dec 12, 1987*		at No. 6 Indiana; Indiana Classic	L 56–63	3–3	Assembly Hall; Bloomington, Indiana
Sun, Dec 20, 1987		Arizona State	L 65–66	3–4 (0–1)	Friel Court; Pullman, Washington
Tue, Dec 22, 1987		No. 1 Arizona	L 55–89	3–5 (0–2)	Friel Court; Pullman, Washington
Sun, Jan 3, 1988*		at Wisconsin	L 65–80	3–6	Wisconsin Field House (6,205); Madison, Wisconsin
Sat, Jan 9, 1988		at Washington	W 70–63	4–6 (1–2)	Hec Edmundson Pavilion; Seattle, Washington
Thu, Jan 14, 1988		at California	W 59–37	5–6 (2–2)	Harmon Gym; Berkeley, California
Sat, Jan 16, 1988		at Stanford	W 70–68	6–6 (3–2)	Maples Pavilion; Stanford, California
Thu, Jan 21, 1988		Oregon	L 46–67	6–7 (3–3)	Friel Court; Pullman, Washington
Sat, Jan 23, 1988		Oregon State	W 56–49	7–7 (4–3)	Friel Court; Pullman, Washington
Thu, Jan 28, 1988		at UCLA	L 63–88	7–8 (4–4)	Pauley Pavilion (6,583); Los Angeles, California
Sat, Jan 30, 1988		at USC	L 60–65	7–9 (4–5)	Los Angeles Sports Arena; Los Angeles, California
Tue, Feb 2, 1988*		Idaho	W 56–43	8–9	Friel Court; Pullman, Washington
Sat, Feb 6, 1988		Washington	W 61–52	9–9 (5–5)	Friel Court; Pullman, Washington
Mon, Feb 8, 1988*		Southwestern Louisiana	W 60–48	10–9	Friel Court; Pullman, Washington
Thu, Feb 11, 1988		Stanford	L 50–51	10–10 (5–6)	Friel Court; Pullman, Washington
Sat, Feb 13, 1988		California	L 76–82	10–11 (5–7)	Friel Court; Pullman, Washington
Thu, Feb 18, 1988		at Oregon State	L 48–62	10–12 (5–8)	Gill Coliseum; Corvallis, Oregon
Sun, Feb 21, 1988		at Oregon	L 66–73	10–13 (5–9)	McArthur Court; Eugene, Oregon
Thu, Feb 25, 1988		USC	W 67–57	11–13 (6–9)	Friel Court; Pullman, Washington
Sat, Feb 27, 1988		UCLA	L 55–62	11–14 (6–10)	Friel Court (5,475); Pullman, Washington
Thu, Mar 3, 1988		at No. 3 Arizona	L 41–79	11–15 (6–11)	McKale Center; Tucson, Arizona
Sun, Mar 6, 1988		at Arizona State	W 70–66	12–15 (7–11)	ASU Activity Center; Tempe, Arizona
Pacific-10 Tournament
Fri, March 11, 1988; 9:00 pm, ESPN	(6)	vs. (3) UCLA; Quarterfinal	W 73–71	13–15	McKale Center (13,061); Tucson, Arizona
Sat, March 12, 1988; 3:00 pm	(6)	vs. (2) Oregon State; Semifinal	L 68–74 ^{2OT}	13–16	McKale Center (13,549); Tucson, Arizona
*Non-conference game. ^{#}Rankings from AP poll. (#) Tournament seedings in parentheses. All times are in Pacific time.
