= 1987–88 UCLA Bruins men's basketball team =

American college basketball season

1987–88 UCLA Bruins men's basketball
- Conference: Pacific-10
- Record: 16–14 (12–6, T-2nd Pac-10)
- Head coach: Walt Hazzard
- Assistant coaches: Sidney Wicks; Jack Hirsch; Andre McCarter
- Home arena: Pauley Pavilion

1987–88 Pacific-10 Conference men's basketball standings
	Conf.				Overall
Team	W		L	PCT	W		L	PCT
No. 2 Arizona †	17	–	1	.944	35	–	3	.921
Oregon State	12	–	6	.667	20	–	11	.645
UCLA	12	–	6	.667	16	–	14	.533
Stanford	11	–	7	.611	21	–	12	.636
Oregon	10	–	8	.556	16	–	14	.533
Washington State	7	–	11	.389	13	–	16	.448
Arizona State	6	–	12	.333	13	–	16	.448
USC	5	–	13	.278	7	–	21	.250
California	5	–	13	.278	9	–	20	.310
Washington	5	–	13	.278	10	–	19	.345
† Conference tournament winner As of April 15, 1988; Rankings from AP Poll

The 1987–88 UCLA Bruins men's basketball team represented the University of California, Los Angeles in the 1987–88 NCAA Division I men's basketball season. UCLA hosted the #12 Temple Owls and the #4 North Carolina Tarheels. UCLA lost their home game to the #3 Wildcats 78–76 in overtime. The Bruins finished tied for second place in the Pac-10 behind Arizona. In the Pac-10 tournament UCLA was upset in their first game vs. Washington St. The Bruins did not play in any post season tournaments after that for the first time in four years. Walt Hazzard who had played for UCLA under John Wooden, coached for his fourth and final year at UCLA (the longest tenure at this point of any post-Wooden coach).

== Starting lineup ==
Position	Player	Class
F	Craig Jackson	Sr.
F	Trevor Wilson	So.
C	Kelvin Butler	Sr.
G	Dave Immel	Sr.
G	Pooh Richardson	Jr.

== Roster ==
1987–88 UCLA Bruins men's basketball team
Players
Coaches

Pos.	#	Name	Height	Weight	Year	Hometown
C	42	Kelvin Butler	6 ft 7 in (2.01 m)	—	Sr
C	32	Greg Foster	7 ft 0 in (2.13 m)	—	So	Oakland, California
G	30	Dave Immel (C)	6 ft 4 in (1.93 m)	—	Sr
F	52	Craig Jackson (C)	6 ft 7 in (2.01 m)	—	Sr
G	12	Gerald Madkins	6 ft 3 in (1.91 m)	—	Fr	Merced, California
G	24	Pooh Richardson	6 ft 1 in (1.85 m)	—	Jr	Philadelphia, Pennsylvania
F	45	Charles Rochelin	6 ft 7 in (2.01 m)	—	Jr
C	50	Kevin Walker	6 ft 10 in (2.08 m)	—	So
G	11	Kevin Williams	6 ft 1 in (1.85 m)	—	Fr
F	4	Trevor Wilson	6 ft 8 in (2.03 m)	—	So	Los Angeles, California

Head coach

Walt Hazzard (UCLA)

Assistant coach(es)

- Sidney Wicks (UCLA)
- Jack Hirsch (UCLA)
- Andre McCarter (UCLA)

Legend

- (C) Team captain
- (S) Suspended
- (I) Ineligible
- (W) Walk-on
- Injured
- Current redshirt

Roster

== Schedule ==
Date time, TV	Rank^{#}	Opponent^{#}	Result	Record	Site city, state
Regular Season
November 20, 1987		Oral Roberts	W 119–79	1–0	Pauley Pavilion (2,641); Los Angeles, CA
November 23, 1987		at New Mexico	L 66–77	1–1	The Pit (14,115); Albuquerque, NM
December 3, 1987		No. 12 Temple	L 76–81	1–2	Pauley Pavilion (8,171); Los Angeles, CA
December 5, 1987		BYU	L 80–87	1–3	Pauley Pavilion (10,696); Los Angeles, CA
December 12, 1987		St. John's	L 64–72	1–4	Pauley Pavilion (9,331); Los Angeles, CA
December 14, 1987		Pennsylvania	W 98–49	2–4	Pauley Pavilion (4,849); Los Angeles, CA
December 17, 1987		UC Irvine	W 116–100	3–4	Pauley Pavilion (6,735); Los Angeles, CA
December 21, 1987		at California	L 70–83	3–5 (0–1)	Harmon Gym (6,450); Berkeley, CA
December 23, 1987		at Stanford	L 110–116 ^{2OT}	3–6 (0–2)	Maples Pavilion (7,236); Stanford, CA
December 28, 1987		Cal State Fullerton	W 74–65	4–6	Pauley Pavilion (7,865); Los Angeles, CA
January 2, 1988		No. 4 North Carolina	L 73–80	4–7	Pauley Pavilion (12,544); Los Angeles, CA
January 7, 1988		Oregon State	L 64–65	4–8 (0–3)	Pauley Pavilion (7,721); Los Angeles, CA
January 10, 1988		Oregon	W 65–60	5–8 (1–3)	Pauley Pavilion (6,165); Los Angeles, CA
January 14, 1988		USC	W 81–65	6–8 (2–3)	Pauley Pavilion (11,425); Los Angeles, CA
January 16, 1988		at Louisville	L 79–92	6–9	Freedom Hall (19,253); Louisville, KY
January 21, 1988		at Arizona State	W 94–81	7–9 (3–3)	ASU Activity Center (7,542); Tempe, AZ
January 24, 1988		at No. 1 Arizona	L 74–86	7–10 (3–4)	McKale Center (13,258); Tucson, AZ
January 28, 1988		Washington State	L 88–663	8–10 (4–4)	Pauley Pavilion (6,583); Los Angeles, CA
January 30, 1988		Washington	W 78–71	9–10 (5–4)	Pauley Pavilion (6,181); Los Angeles, CA
February 4, 1988		at Oregon	W 76–71	10–10 (6–4)	McArthur Court (8,554); Eugene, OR
February 7, 1988		at Oregon State	L 68–73	10–11 (6–5)	Gill Coliseum (7,612); Corvallis, OR
February 11, 1988		at USC	W 85–70	11–11 (7–5)	Los Angeles Memorial Sports Arena (6,057); Los Angeles, CA
February 14, 1988		at Notre Dame	L 66–73	11–12	Edmund P. Joyce Center (11,418); Notre Dame, IN
February 18, 1988		Arizona State	W 79–73	12–12 (8–5)	Pauley Pavilion (5,427); Los Angeles, CA
February 20, 1988		No. 3 Arizona	L 76–78 ^{OT}	12–13 (8–6)	Pauley Pavilion (12,037); Los Angeles, CA
February 25, 1988		at Washington	W 97–87	13–13 (9–6)	Hec Edmundson Pavilion (3,235); Seattle, WA
February 27, 1988		at Washington State	W 62–55	14–13 (10–6)	Beasley Coliseum (5,475); Pullman, WA
March 3, 1988		Stanford	W 91–69	15–13 (11–6)	Pauley Pavilion (7,453); Los Angeles, CA
March 6, 1988		California	W 74–66	16–13 (12–6)	Pauley Pavilion (7,710); Los Angeles, CA
Pac-10 Tournament
March 11, 1988		vs. Washington State; Quarterfinals	L 71–73	16–14	McKale Center (13,061); Tucson, AZ
*Non-conference game. ^{#}Rankings from AP Poll. (#) Tournament seedings in parentheses. All times are in Pacific Time.

== Notes ==
- Oregon St. swept the Bruins for the first time in four years (1983–84), and for only the third time since 1958.
