= 1987–88 Wyoming Cowboys basketball team =

American college basketball season

1987–88 Wyoming Cowboys basketball

WAC Tournament Champions

NCAA men's Division I tournament, first round
- Conference: Western Athletic Conference

Ranking
- Coaches: No. 13
- AP: No. 13
- Record: 26–6 (11–5 WAC)
- Head coach: Benny Dees (1st season)
- Assistant coach: Billy Kennedy (1st season)
- Home arena: Arena-Auditorium

1987–88 WAC men's basketball standings
	Conf.				Overall
Team	W		L	PCT	W		L	PCT
No. 19 BYU	13	–	3	.813	26	–	6	.813
No. 13 Wyoming †	11	–	5	.688	26	–	6	.813
Utah	11	–	5	.688	19	–	11	.633
UTEP	10	–	6	.625	23	–	10	.697
New Mexico	8	–	8	.500	22	–	14	.611
Colorado State	8	–	8	.500	22	–	13	.629
San Diego State	5	–	11	.313	12	–	17	.414
Air Force	4	–	12	.250	11	–	17	.393
Hawaii	2	–	14	.125	4	–	25	.138
† 1988 WAC tournament winner Rankings from AP poll

The 1987–88 Wyoming Cowboys basketball team represented the University of Wyoming in the 1987–88 NCAA Division I men's basketball season. (The school uses "Cowboys" solely for men's sports; women's teams and athletes at the school are known as "Cowgirls".)

Fennis Dembo was featured on the cover of the November 18, 1987, issue of Sports Illustrated. It was the first time that a Wyoming Cowboy basketball player was featured on the cover. Dembo would finish his Wyoming career as the Cowboys scoring leader, 2,311 points

== Roster ==
1987–88 Wyoming Cowboys men's basketball team
Players
Coaches

Pos.	#	Name	Height	Weight	Year	Previous school	Hometown
F	34	Fennis Dembo	6 ft 5 in (1.96 m)	210 lb (95 kg)	Sr	Fox Tech HS	San Antonio, Texas
C	43	Eric Leckner	6 ft 11 in (2.11 m)	255 lb (116 kg)	Sr	Mira Costa HS	Manhattan Beach, California

Head coach

- Benny Dees (Wyoming)

Assistant coach(es)

- Billy Kennedy (Southeastern Louisiana)

Legend

- (C) Team captain
- (S) Suspended
- (I) Ineligible
- (W) Walk-on
- Injured
- Current redshirt

== Regular season ==
=== Player stats ===
Player	Games	Minutes	Field goals	Three Pointers	Rebounds	Blocks	Steals	Points
Fennis Dembo	32	1076	205	65	231	22	51	653
Eric Leckner	32	972	181	0	210	43	29	492

== NCAA basketball tournament ==
- West
  - Loyola Marymount (10) 119, Wyoming (7) 115

== Team players drafted into the NBA ==
Round	Pick	Player	NBA Team
1	17	Eric Leckner	Utah Jazz
2	30	Fennis Dembo	Detroit Pistons

== Awards and honors ==
- Fennis Dembo, First Team All-Western Athletic Conference
