= David Tineo =

American painter

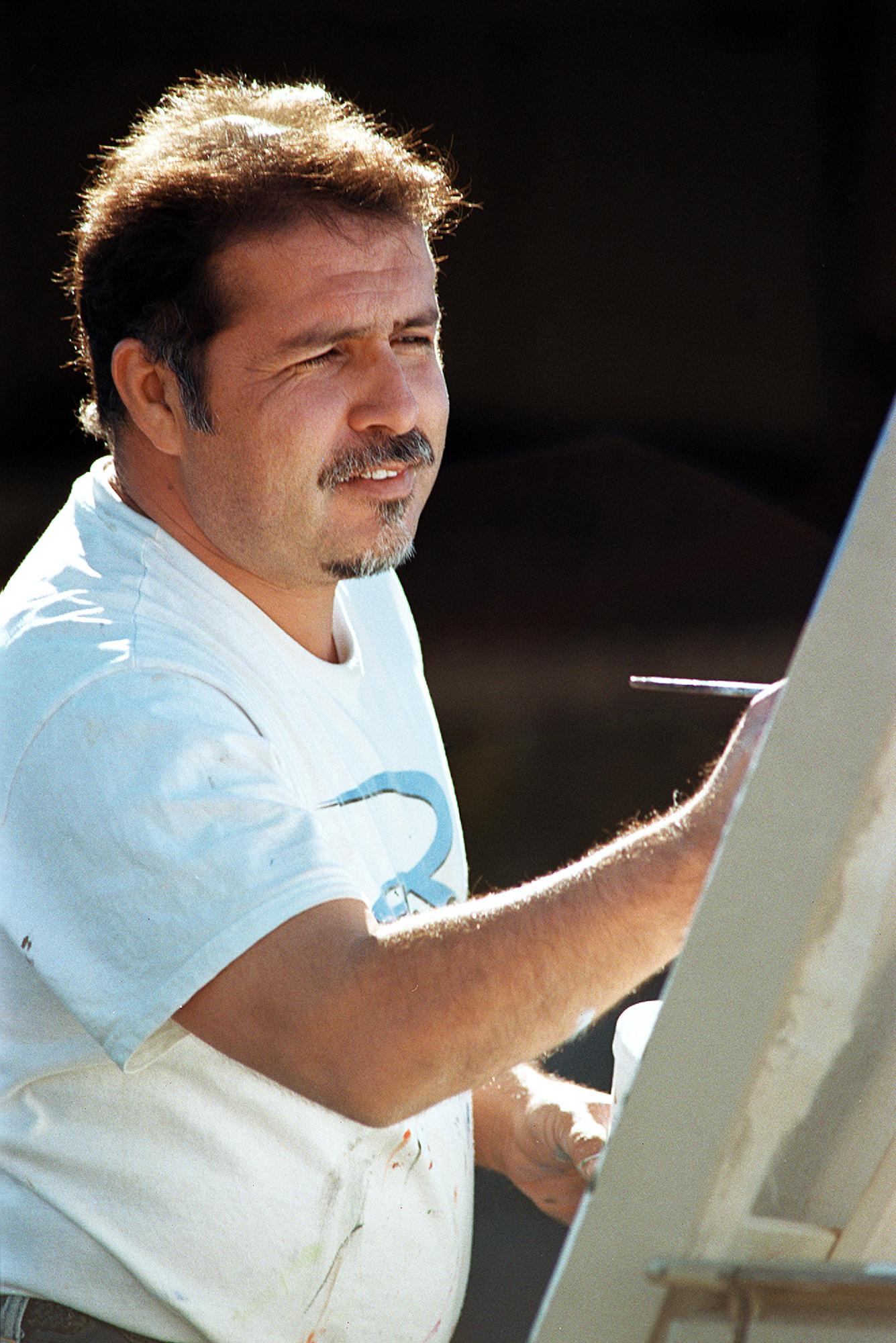
David Tineo at work

David Tineo (born May 23, 1955) is an American artist of Mexican descent whose works focus on cultural and identity issues particular to Mexican Americans who live in the U.S. Though internationally known, most of Tineo's life and career has been spent in Tucson, Arizona. He was diagnosed in 2004 with a macular degeneration that left him legally blind, but continues to paint and sculpt.

== Early life ==
David Tineo was born in Douglas, Arizona, a small town on the U.S.-Mexico border. His father, Patrick Tineo, a Portuguese immigrant whose own father entered the United States via Ellis Island, was mistakenly deported to Mexico when he was a young man, where he met and married Ernestina Figueroa, the woman who became David's mother. David's family moved from Douglas to a barrio in west Tucson in 1959. His father separated from the family in 1969 after which Ernestina sold tamales, cleaned homes, took in ironing, and worked various housekeeping jobs to raise her seven children while simultaneously learning English. Tineo's prodigious artistic abilities were evident early in life. His parents submitted samples of his artwork to various national art contests, all of which were rejected by judges who refused to believe they’d been drawn by a child. Tineo's artistic talent was also recognized by his teachers, who encouraged its development throughout Tineo's elementary, middle, and high school years. He began to seriously study ceramics, human anatomy and figurative drawing at Cholla High School, from which he graduated in 1974. This ability to represent form in three-dimensional space would later help him continue producing art after his vision began to fail.

Tineo received a Pell Grant after high school to study ceramics at Arizona Western College in Yuma, Arizona, then transferred to Pima Community College in January 1976 to complete his studies in Tucson and be near his family. During the summer between high school and college he’d become involved with the newly constructed El Rio Neighborhood Center, where he’d met and befriended Antonio Pazos, an older, more experienced artist and former member of the San Diego Chicano activist/muralist group Toltecas de Aztlan. Tineo and Pazos would later collaborate on Nuestras Raíces Humanas, one of Tucson's largest and most famous works of mural art. While taking painting classes at Pima College he renewed his ties with the El Rio Neighborhood Center and in 1976 was asked by them to paint a mural, Tineo's first, on the building's central patio, where it remains today. In the fall of 1976 Tineo joined the U.S. Army and was assigned to the S3 (Military) Operations Unit of the 3rd Infantry Division stationed in Schweinfurt, Germany, where he was promoted to the rank of specialist and his skills applied to cartography and the production of presentation materials to upper-level officers. Tineo was honorably discharged from the Army in 1979.

== Political influences ==
Tineo's art has been profoundly influenced by the social, political and historical issues pertaining to Mexican-American identity in America.

=== Chicano Movement ===
The rise and political development of the Chicano Movement in the 1960s and 1970s, and concomitant birth of the Chicano Art Movement, helped focus Tineo's attention on the role of art in community activism. During this period Tineo spent time working with the Brown Berets, MEChA (Movimiento Estudiantil Chicano de Aztlan) and other community activist groups, and he is still considered one of the most influential leaders of the Chicano Mural Movement in Arizona. Decades later, in 1991, Tineo's art was included in the Chicano Art: Resistance and Affirmation (CARA), exhibit organized by the Wight Art Gallery in UCLA. The CARA exhibit, which traveled to various cities around the U.S., was the first exhibit ever to focus on the works of artists engaged in the Chicano civil rights movement; it firmly established Chicano art – in all its forms – as a distinct and legitimate part of American Art in general. Tineo helped lead the development of the Chicano Mural Movement both in Arizona and Tucson during the latter half of the 20th century, and remains an important part of the city's visual history.

=== Clifton miners' strike ===
Tineo's artwork first came to national prominence after the 1983-1986 Arizona Copper Mine Strike in Clifton, Arizona, which pitted local union workers – most of whom were Hispanic—against the Phelps-Dodge Corporation. Tineo was asked by union leader Angel Rodriguez to come to Clifton and paint a mural that would symbolize the union workers’ plight and the essence of their struggle. Because tensions were high during this multi-year strike –- at one point the National Guard was called in, as well as a virtual army of state policemen backed up by tanks and helicopters -– the event drew international media coverage, and Tineo's mural has frequently been used as a visual representation of the pivotal point in U.S. history when the power of America's unions began to decline. Tineo's 10’ x 40’ mural still graces the inner north wall of the former Steelworkers Union Hall in Clifton, and the image has been used on banners, posters and signs to commemorate the episode.

== Artwork ==
The symbols, themes and techniques in Tineo's art have their roots in Mexican folk art but are associated with the political ideals of the Chicano Art Movement. His works invoke ancient cultural symbols and mythologies; objects and themes from everyday life; and an emphasis upon education as a political and practical means of bringing Mexican Americans full equality and participation in American life.

In 2010 the Tucson Museum of Art's ¡Viva David Tineo! retrospective corrected the common misconception of Tineo as primarily a muralist. He's completed over 3,000 paintings over the course of his 38-year career, and his canvases hang on the walls of private collectors, museums, galleries (including a gallery in South Tucson devoted entirely to his work), and political entities from the US and Mexico to Kazakhstan. To honor the quality and extent of his career the Tucson Pima Arts Council presented Tineo with a Lifetime Achievement Award in 2011. Though his blindness required Tineo to quit teaching, it did not stop him from painting. Because he often sees only glare, and cannot make out light, shadow or different shades of color, Tineo has explored numerous techniques for replacing his dependence on vision. He usually lays his canvases on the ground and outlines concepts with caulks and silicon adhesives, achieving more subtle textures with a wet sponge, before applying paints. By creating these textured, 3D surfaces he can “see” the canvas with his hands and feel it through his brush. His more tactile painting style has created an evolution in his conceptual style as well: his artwork is now more symbolic, and the colors more direct, with fewer fine details.

== Blindness ==
David Tineo's eyesight began to fail in 2004. Batteries of eye tests, MRIs and EKGs resulted in an uncertain diagnosis. Nothing could be done, and he was legally blind within a year. As his eyesight continued to deteriorate tests suggested his condition was related to some form of macular degeneration.

Though no definitive diagnosis can as yet be made, ophthalmologists agree that his condition cannot be halted, cured or reversed without the intervention of as-yet-unknown developments in medical science.

What Tineo sees is a dense, obscuring fog in the center of his vision which, if the light is good, allows objects to appear as a blur, though with black turned white and white turned black, as in a photographic negative. If the light indoors or out is too bright, the fog turns into an intense and painful glare.

Around the outer periphery of this heavy fog is a thin rim of lighter fog through which, on a “good-eye day,” Tineo can occasionally make out images, contrasts and color. His brain receives this information and transforms it into visual hints coupled with memory that he has learned to assemble into some semblance of vision. Tineo reportedly paints more easily in the early morning, before the desert daylight becomes intense and painful to him. Some mornings, strong natural lighting allows for painting of details on smaller canvases. Other mornings, detailed work is not impossible; instead he works on larger projects—that he can’t quite see—by relying on imagination, years of experience, and muscle memory with a brush.

== Career as an educator ==
Robert Knight, director of the Tucson Museum of Art, called Tineo “a warrior for education.” Tineo taught art in Tucson and advocated formal education, particularly for Mexican American children and other children from low-income backgrounds.

… as an influential art educator, David Tineo has worked and advocated to minimize school dropout rates, demonstrated the importance of bilingual-bicultural education programs, and provided a role model for his students; and through their success, he has increased financial assistance and aid programs for at-risk students.

Nominated for a Governor's Arts Award in 2006, which was personally presented to him by then-Governor Janet Napolitano, Tineo was honored for his tireless work on mural projects for children at more than 200 local schools and his participation in an Art for the People initiative that focused on exposing at-risk kids to art training, expression and experience. Tineo taught art at Pima College for 20 years before being forced by his blindness to retire, and has for many decades been teaching, lecturing, leading workshops or consulting at the University of Arizona, various private art galleries, and innumerable youth groups, neighborhood programs and community-based organizations.

Tineo holds a BFA degree from the University of Arizona, with a major in Fine Arts and a minor in Chicano Studies, as well as an AA degree in Social Studies and an AA degree in General Studies from Pima College.

== Selected honors ==
- Robert Rauschenberg Foundation/Lab School of Washington Honoree, 1999
- Governor's Arts Award, April 2006
- Tucson Pima Arts Council – Lumie Arts and Business Award, Lifetime Achievement Award], 2011
- Lifetime achievement award for visual arts from the League of United Latin American Citizens, October 2006

== Selected exhibitions ==
Tineo's art has been shown at:

- University of Arizona Museum of Art, Cultural I, Cultural II, Cultural III, Tucson, Arizona
- Tucson Museum of Art, ¡Viva David Tineo!, Tucson, Arizona
- Touring exhibition, CARA: Chicano Art Resistance and Affirmation, organized by the Wight Art Gallery, University of California, Los Angeles
- Heard Museum, Phoenix, Arizona
- Jose Galvez Photo and Gallery Workshop, La vida y la muerte, Tucson, Arizona
- Central Arts Collective, Tucson, Arizona
- Raíces Taller 222, Art Gallery and Workshop, Tucson, Arizona
- Galeria La Sirena, Tucson, Arizona
- Davis Dominguez Gallery, Small Works, Tucson, Arizona
- Tucson Jewish Community Center, Spring Awakening and Touch Me, Tucson, Arizona
- Galería Mística, Myth and Legend, Tucson, Arizona
- Contreras Gallery, Tucson, Arizona
