= Ajak (Hungary) =

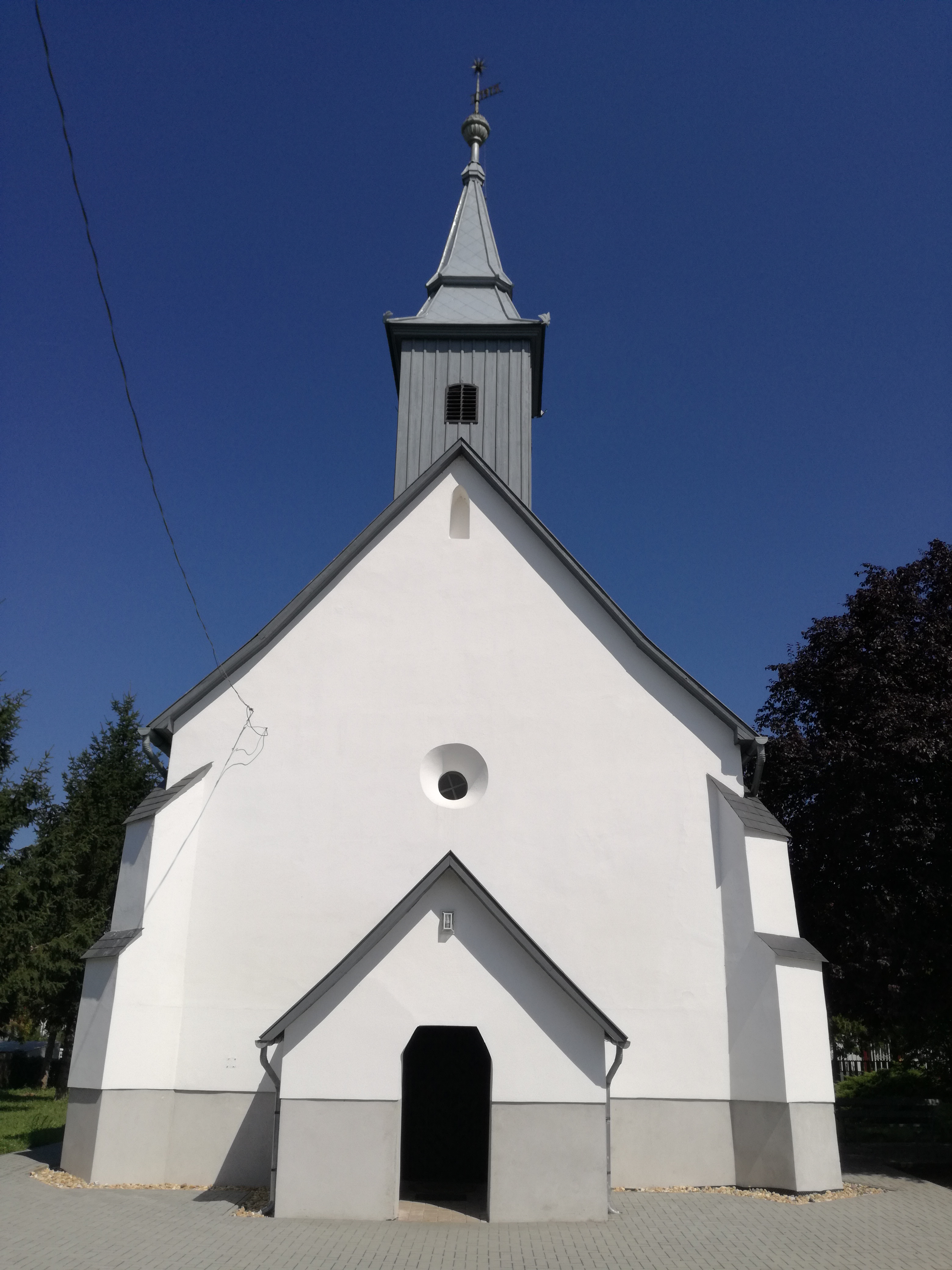

- Flag Coat of arms

- Location within Hungary
- Coordinates: 48°11′N 22°02′E
- Country: Hungary
- County: Szabolcs-Szatmár-Bereg

Area
  - Total: 24.76 km^{2} (9.56 sq mi)

Population (2015)
  - Total: 3,730
  - Density: 151/km^{2} (390/sq mi)
- Time zone: UTC+1 (CET)
  - Summer (DST): UTC+2 (CEST)
- Postal code: 4524
- Area code: 45

Ajak is a town in Szabolcs-Szatmár-Bereg county, in the Northern Great Plain region of eastern Hungary.

At the end of the 19th century and the beginning of the 20th century, Jews lived in the village. In 1910, 83 Jews lived in the village. Some of them were murdered in the Holocaust.

== Etymology ==
The name of the town is of uncertain origin. It may come from a personal name. This personal name can come from the Turkish word ajaq ('leg'), or the old Hungarian aj ('opening'). Another possibility is that it was named from a fishpond called Ajakas-tó due to it having one course.

== Geography ==
It covers an area of 24.76 km^{2} (9.56 sq mi) and has a population of 3952 people (2002).

== Notable people ==
- Laszlo Szekely, planter and writer who was married to Madelon Szekely – Lulofs.
