= 1968–69 VCU Rams men's basketball team =

American college basketball season

1968–69 VCU Rams men's basketball
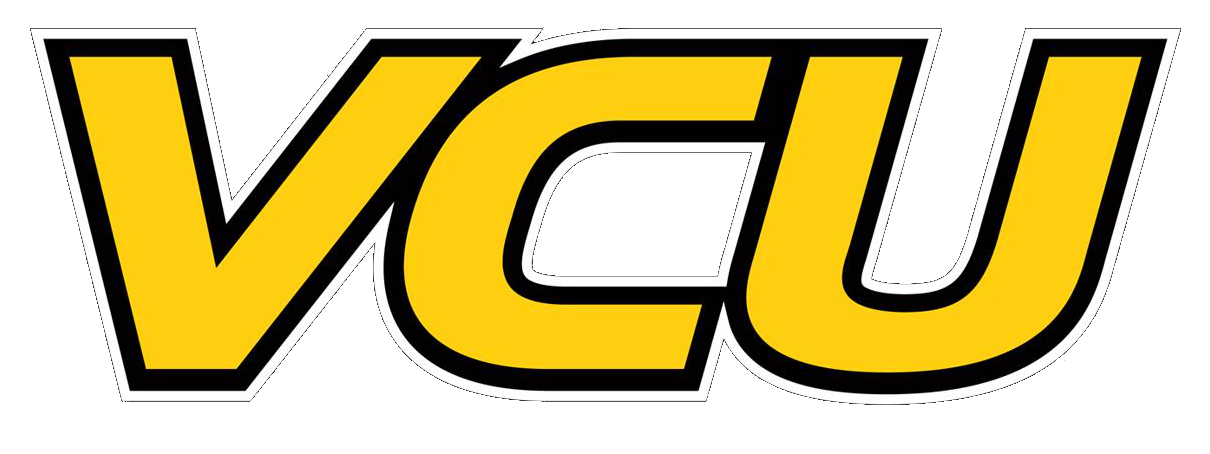
- Conference: Independent
- Record: 12–11
- Head coach: Benny Dees
- Home arena: Franklin Street Gym

The 1968–69 VCU Rams men's basketball team represented the newly created Virginia Commonwealth University during the 1968–69 NCAA men's basketball season. Led by Benny Dees, the Rams played their inaugural season as an independent team, playing a mix of Division I, II and III schools across the Mid-Atlantic, Ohio River Valley and Southeast regions. After an 0–4 start, the Rams finished the season with a winning record of 12–11. During the season, they played in two winter tournaments; the Fort Eustis and Quantico tournaments held at Virginia military bases, Joint Base Langley–Eustis and Marine Corps Base Quantico. The team did not earn a berth into either the NCAA or NIT tournaments.

During the team's inaugural season, the Rams played in the Franklin Street Gymnasium, which was their home arena until the opening of the Siegel Center in the late 1990s.

== Schedule ==
Date time, TV	Rank^{#}	Opponent^{#}	Result	Record	Site (attendance) city, state
Non-conference regular season
Nov 27, 1968*		at Augusta State	L 71–89	0–1	Augusta Civic Center; Augusta, GA
Nov 30, 1968*		at Georgia Southern	L 88–105	0–2	Augusta Civic Center; Statesboro, GA
Dec 6, 1968*		Washington and Lee	L 70–83	0–3	Franklin Street Gym; Richmond, VA
Dec 7, 1968*		at Hampden–Sydney	L 79–83	0–4	Kirby Fieldhouse; Hampden Sydney, VA
Dec 9, 1968*		Newport News Apprentice	W 78–69	1–4	Franklin Street Gym; Richmond, VA
Dec 13, 1968*		Southeastern (FL)	W 120–77	2–4	Franklin Street Gym; Richmond, VA
Dec 14, 1968*		at Pembroke State	W 86–77	3–4	English E. Jones Center; Pembroke, NC
Dec 18, 1968*		vs. Bridgewater; MCB Quantico Tournament	W 101–84	4–4	Barber Center; Quantico, VA
Dec 19, 1968*		vs. NYIT; MCB Quantico Tournament	L 81–103	4–5	Barber Center; Quantico, VA
Dec 20, 1968*		vs. West Liberty State; MCB Quantico Tournament	W 106–100 ^{OT}	5–5	Barber Center; Quantico, VA
Dec 21, 1968*		vs. Maryland State; MCB Quantico Tournament	L 69–71	5–6	Barber Center; Quantico, VA
Dec 27, 1968*		vs. Roanoke; Fort Eustis Tournament	L 59–84	5–7	Anderson Field House; Newport News, VA
Dec 28, 1968*		vs. West Virginia State; Fort Eustis Tournament	W 79–73	6–7	Anderson Field House; Newport News, VA
Dec 29, 1968*		vs. Denison; Fort Eustis Tournament	W 76–69	7–7	Anderson Field House; Newport News, VA
Jan 7, 1969*		at Washington and Lee	L 75–80	7–8	Doremus–Warner Center; Lexington, VA
Jan 9, 1969*		at Virginia Union	W 96–74	8–8	Barco–Stevens Hall; Richmond, VA
Jan 11, 1969*		at Pembroke State	W 72–57	9–8	Franklin Street Gym; Richmond, VA
Jan 15, 1969*		at High Point	L 77–109	9–9	Alumni Hall; High Point, NC
Feb 5, 1969*		at Old Dominion; Rivalry	L 69–101	9–10	Norfolk Municipal Auditorium; Norfolk, VA
Feb 8, 1969*		at Southeastern (FL)	W 89–60	10–10	Franklin Street Gym; Lakeland, FL
Feb 12, 1969*		Virginia Union	L 82–89	10–11	Franklin Street Gym; Richmond, VA
Feb 18, 1969*		Bridgewater	W 95–86	11–11	Franklin Street Gym; Richmond, VA
Feb 20, 1969*		Hampden–Sydney	W 101–84	12–11	Franklin Street Gym; Richmond, VA
*Non-conference game. ^{#}Rankings from AP Poll. (#) Tournament seedings in parentheses.

Source: Men's Basketball 1968–69 Results, VCU Athetlics
