= Kendrick Warren =

American basketball player (born 1971)

Personal information
- Born: May 27, 1971 (age 55) Richmond, Virginia
- Listed height: 6 ft 8 in (2.03 m)
- Listed weight: 220 lb (100 kg)

Career information
- High school: Thomas Jefferson (Richmond, Virginia)
- College: VCU (1990–1994)
- NBA draft: 1994: undrafted
- Playing career: 1994–2005
- Position: Forward

Career history
- 1994–1995: Rockford Lightning
- 1995: Malmö BF
- 1995–1998: Yakima SunKings
- 1998: Ciudad de Huelva
- 1998–1999: Flamengo
- 1999–2000: Richmond Rhythm
- 2000–2001: London Towers
- 2001: Espoon Honka
- 2001–2002: Birmingham Bullets
- 2002–2003: London Towers
- 2003–2004: Brighton Bears
- 2004–2005: Hermine Nantes

Career highlights
- CBA All-Star (1995); All-CBA Second Team (1998); CBA All-Defensive Team (1998); CBA Rookie of the Year (1995); CBA All-Rookie First Team (1995); BBL All-Star (2001); Korisliiga champion (2002); Sun Belt Freshman of the Year (1991); 3× First-team All-Metro Conference (1992–1994); First-team All-Sun Belt (1991); No. 23 jersey retired by VCU Rams; McDonald's All-American (1990); Fourth-team Parade All-American (1990)

Kendrick Warren (born May 27, 1971) is an American former professional basketball player.

== High school career ==
A native of Richmond, Virginia, Warren attended Thomas Jefferson High School and during his time there became a nationally ranked player. He averaged 27 points and 11 rebounds in his junior year and as a senior he averaged 26 points and 12 rebounds. One of the best forwards in his class, he was Richmond Player of the Year twice and at the end of his senior year he was selected in the Parade All-America fourth team and was named a McDonald's All-American. In the 1990 McDonald's All-American Boys Game he scored 4 points shooting 1 for 4 from the field and 2 for 2 from the free throw line.

== College career ==
Already during his junior year of high school Warren had expressed his will to play for Virginia Commonwealth University, and he committed to VCU in 1990, after his McDonald's All-American selection. His freshman season at VCU saw him leading the team in both scoring and rebounding, with respective averages of 15.7 and 8.5, was awarded the Sun Belt Freshman of the Year and was named in the All-Conference Team. His sophomore season was even more successful and was his best scoring season: he averaged 19.0 points per game, starting all of his 29 games, and was the 3rd best scorer of the 1991–92 Metro Conference tournament. The 1992–93 season saw Warren average 17.6 points and 9.1 rebounds, and VCU reached the Conference finals, where they were defeated by Louisville 90 to 78. Warren's senior season saw a significant improvement in his rebounding average, and he led the Metro Conference with 12.4 rebounds per game. He finished his career as VCU top scorer of all time with 1,858 points (his record has since been surpassed) and was second in career rebounds with 1,049 (the record belongs to Lorenza Watson with 1,143). In 2005 VCU retired his jersey number, 23.

=== College statistics ===
Year	Team	GP	GS	MPG	FG%	3P%	FT%	RPG	APG	SPG	BPG	PPG
1990–91	VCU	31	30	28.1	541.	.125	.660	8.5	1.6	1.1	2.1	15.7
1991–92	VCU	29	29	33.8	.543	.000	.508	9.5	2.1	1.4	1.5	19.0
1992–93	VCU	19	19	30.2	.502	.200	.522	9.1	1.9	1.6	1.3	17.6
1993–94	VCU	27	27	32.9	.533	.500	.477	12.4	2.0	1.5	2.2	18.0
Career		106	105	31.3	.532	.214	.538	9.9	1.9	1.4	1.8	17.5

== Professional career ==
Warren became automatically eligible for the 1994 NBA draft after his senior year, but he was not selected by any of the NBA teams. He was drafted 3rd overall in the 1994 CBA Draft by the Rockford Lightning and played his first season as a pro in the Continental Basketball Association. Warren played all 56 games of the 1994–95 season, was named the CBA Rookie of the Year and was an All-Star selection. He averaged 18.1 points and 7.4 rebounds. After his successful rookie season in the CBA, Warren decided to play overseas and had a brief experience in Sweden, where he played for Malmö.

He came back to the United States in 1995 and played 3 more years in the CBA, this time for the Yakima SunKings, where he averaged 16.3 points and 7.8 rebounds in the 1995–96 season and 14.0 points and 9.0 rebounds in the 1997–98 season. Warren was selected to the All-CBA Second Team and All-Defensive Team in 1998. He then transferred abroad again, this time first to Huelva in Spain and then to Brazilian team Flamengo; in 1999 he signed for his hometown team, the newly founded Richmond Rhythm of the International Basketball League. He played for London Towers in the 2000–2001 British Basketball League, and he was selected in the All-Star team thanks to his 20.7 points per game. He also appeared in 9 EuroLeague games that season.

He won the 2001–02 Finnish league with the Espoon Honka, and then played in England for 3 more seasons before ending his career with Hermine Nantes in the LNB Pro B.

== Filmography ==
1995 Rugrats as Micheal McNeal
