= Lute Olson =

American basketball player and coach (1934–2020)

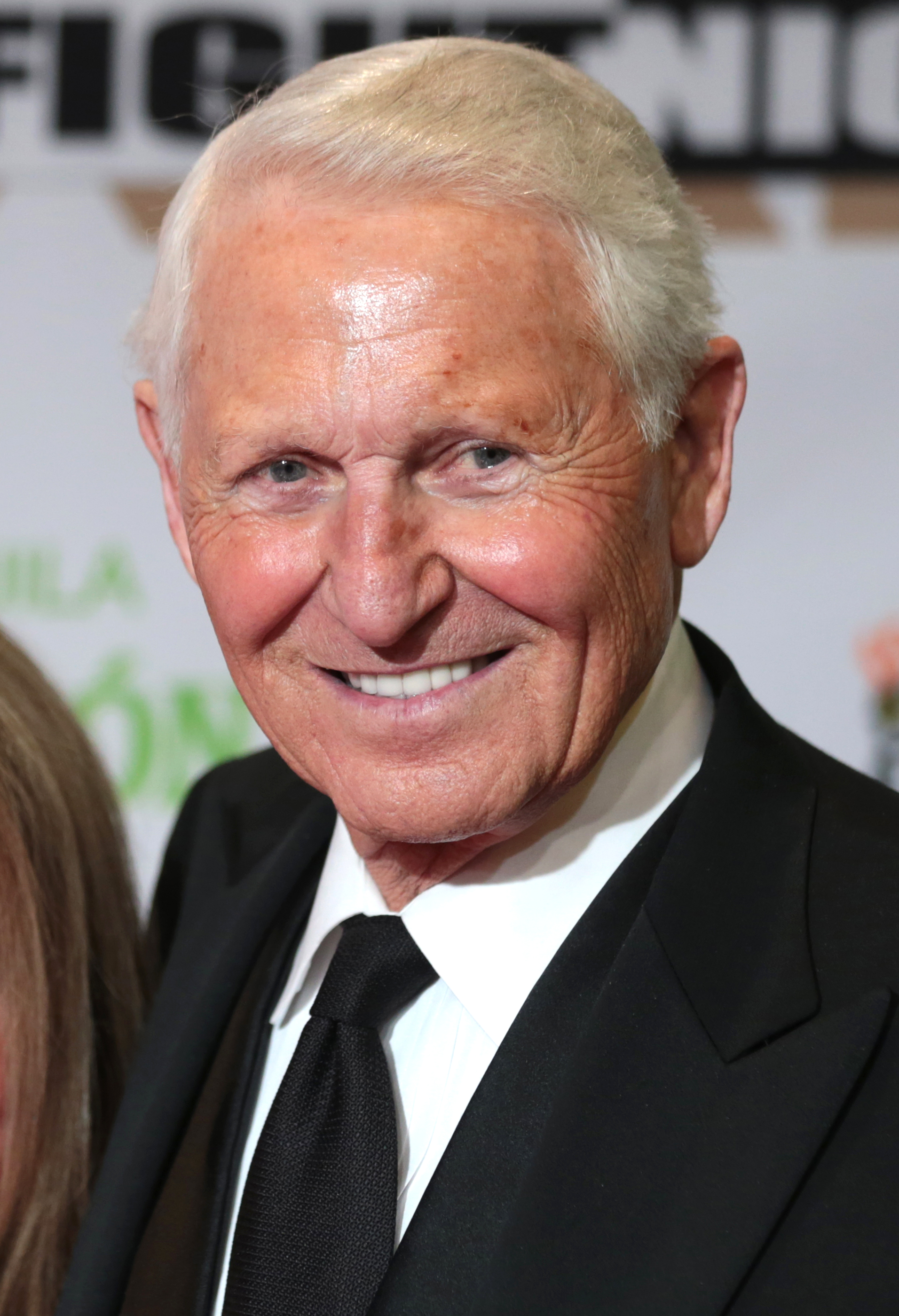
- Olson in 2017

Biographical details
- Born: September 22, 1934; Mayville, North Dakota, U.S.
- Died: August 27, 2020 (aged 85); Tucson, Arizona, U.S.

Playing career
- 1953–1956: Augsburg

Coaching career (HC unless noted)
- 1956–1957: Mahnomen HS
- 1957–1961: Two Harbors HS
- 1962–1963: Western HS (assistant)
- 1963–1964: Loara HS
- 1964–1969: Marina HS
- 1969–1973: Long Beach CC
- 1973–1974: Long Beach State
- 1974–1983: Iowa
- 1983–2007: Arizona

Head coaching record
- Overall: 781–280 (college)

Accomplishments and honors

Championships
- NCAA Division I tournament (1997); 5 NCAA Division I regional – Final Four (1980, 1988, 1994, 1997, 2001); PCAA regular season (1974); Big Ten regular season (1979); 11 Pac-10 regular season (1986, 1988–1991, 1993, 1994, 1998, 2000, 2003, 2005); 4 Pac-10 tournament (1988–1990, 2002)

Awards
- NABC Coach of the Year (1980); Clair Bee Coach of the Year Award (2001); Big Ten Coach of the Year (1979); 7× Pac-10 Coach of the Year (1986, 1988, 1989, 1993, 1994, 1998, 2003)
- Basketball Hall of Fame; Inducted in 2002
- College Basketball Hall of Fame; Inducted in 2006 & 2019
Medal record
Men's basketball
Representing United States
FIBA World Championship
Gold medal – first place	1986 Spain	National team

Robert Luther "Lute" Olson (September 22, 1934 – August 27, 2020) was an American basketball coach, who was inducted into both the Naismith Memorial Basketball Hall of Fame and the National Collegiate Basketball Hall of Fame. He was the head coach of the Arizona Wildcats men's team for 24 years. He was also head coach for the Iowa Hawkeyes for nine years and Long Beach State 49ers for one season. Known for player development and great recruiting, many of his former players have gone on to have impressive careers in the NBA. On October 23, 2008, Olson announced his retirement from coaching. Olson died on August 27, 2020, in Tucson, Arizona. He was 85 years old.

== Biography ==
=== Early life ===
Olson was born on a farm outside Mayville, North Dakota on September 22, 1934, and was of Norwegian-American parentage.

In 1939, Olson's father, Albert died of a stroke at age 47. There are memories of Albert giving his children haircuts that morning before church before collapsing. Lute's mother, Alinda, said Albert was "different" returning from WWI, some believed he may have been exposed to poison gas while working in a military construction battalion.

Just a few months later, Olson's older brother Amos, who had returned from Mayville State College to run the family farm, died in a tractor accident on the farm. This forced Alinda Olson to move away from the farm and into Mayville. There, Olson attended his first three years at Mayville High School, before eventually graduating from Grand Forks Central High School after the family moved again. Olson was coached by Harold Poier at Mayville, where he grew to 6 ft 3 in (1.91 m) as a junior. At Grand Forks, Olson played in his senior year for Coach Fritz Engel in both summer American Legion baseball and basketball, playing football for Coaches Bob Peskey and Louis King.

In 1951, the family had moved to Grand Forks, where Lute's older sister Kathleen had moved to study nursing. It was there, while singing in the church choir, that Lute first met Bobbi Russell. The pair became inseparable. In 1951–52, Olson led Grand Forks Central to the 1952 state basketball championship, playing center. Central beat Williston 43–38 for the title, as Olson scored 16 points. Earlier in the 1952 state tournament, Olson's Central team had defeated Minot St. Leo's, featuring future Louisiana State University coach Dale Brown.

Olson enrolled at Augsburg University in Minneapolis, Minnesota after completing high school. There, he played football, basketball and one year of baseball. Olson graduated in 1956 with double major in history and physical education and Olson was awarded the "Augsburg Honors Athlete Award," given annually to the top Augsburg male student-athlete. While at Augsburg, he and Bobbi were married on Thanksgiving, 1953. Reminiscing about winters in Minnesota, Olson said "Growing up, it was fine because I didn't know any better," Olson said. "People from North Dakota go south to Minneapolis for the winter."

After graduating from Augsburg, Olson taught and coached high school basketball for 13 years. First in Minnesota at Mahnomen and Two Harbors, Minnesota for five years total. In 1961, Olson and Bobbi moved west, first to Boulder, Colorado, where Olson was a middle school guidance counselor. Then they moved to California where, in 1962–1963, Olson coached the freshman basketball team at Western High School in Anaheim. In 1963 Olson became the varsity coach at Loara High School, also in Anaheim. In 1964 he was hired as varsity head coach at Marina-Huntington Beach High School.

== Head coaching career ==
=== Long Beach City College (1969–1973) ===
In summer 1969, Olson became head coach at Long Beach City College. Olson took the position after desiring to coach in college and seizing the opportunity when coach Rex Hughes left LBCC for the University of Nebraska–Lincoln. Olson was 35 years old with 5 children when making the career change from high school to college. As a high school teacher, Olson mentioned he had tired of mundane items such as hall monitoring and checking restrooms for smokers. Olson had also been working side jobs working for Wright Driving School and driving a gas truck for Texaco.

Olson later said to the media of his move to LBCC, "I wanted a college job and at 35 I felt I couldn't wait much longer." Olson proved to be an immediate success at the college level, leading his Long Beach City College teams to a 103–22 record over four seasons and capturing the 1971 JC Championship.

Of his tenure at Long Beach City College, Olson said, "I was perfectly content there, and had no plans to go anyplace, I loved it there. Del Walker, a great guy, was the athletic director, and I recall his telling me when he hired me that he wanted me to recruit players strictly from the Long Beach area, which I did."

His success was noticed in Long Beach, leading to an opportunity to enter the NCAA coaching ranks in 1973.

=== Long Beach State University (1973–1974) ===
In Olson's one season at Long Beach State, he led the team to an undefeated conference record, a Big West championship and a 24–2 record. The only two losses were two-point losses at Colorado and at #6 Marquette University.

Olson had been content to stay at LBCC, but was pursued by LBSU. "I wasn't that interested because there were rumors that Long Beach was about to go on NCAA probation," Olson said. "I told them I'd need about 10 days to think about it. They told me during that time that Long Beach wasn't going to go on probation. I believed them, but they didn't tell me the truth."

Olson followed Jerry Tarkanian as coach, and Tarkanian had built the program into a national power, before leaving for the University of Nevada-Las Vegas.

Under Olson, the 49ers were ranked as high as #3 behind Coach John Wooden and player Bill Walton's UCLA squad and eventual NCAA Tournament Champion North Carolina State. However, with a #10 regular season ranking, the team was banned from appearing in the NCAA tournament after being put on a 3-year probation mid-season, due to recruiting violations from the Tarkanian era.

Five 49ers players from that season were drafted into the NBA. Drafted were: Cliff Pondexter (Chicago), his brother Roscoe Pondexter (Boston), All-American Glenn McDonald (1st Round, Boston), Leonard Gray (Seattle) and a year later, Bobby Gross (Portland). The 24–2 mark still stands as the school's best season winning percentage.

After one season at Long Beach State, Olson accepted the head coaching position at the University of Iowa.

=== University of Iowa (1974–1983) ===
Olson left Long Beach for the University of Iowa and later remarked, "People didn't go from Long Beach to Iowa, they went from Iowa to Long Beach," Olson said. "I thought, 'well, I'm just going to break that trend.' I saw an opportunity."" I also liked it at Long Beach State, but I felt I had been lied to and decided to leave even though Iowa wasn't exactly a basketball hotbed," he said.

Olson coached Iowa for nine seasons, from 1974 to 1983, with an overall record of 167–91 (.647), leaving as the school's all-time wins leader.

Olson inherited an Iowa team that had gone 8-16 under Dick Schultz, finishing 10th in the Big Ten and suffered four consecutive losing seasons. Olson turned the Iowa Basketball program around, going 19–10 in just his second season. Iowa then won the Big Ten Conference Title in 1978–79, earning the first of five consecutive NCAA Tournament berths.

In 1979–1980, Olson led the Hawkeyes to a Final Four appearance in the 1980 NCAA Division I men's basketball tournament. The team made the now 48-team NCAA tournament with an 18–8 record (10–8, 4th in the Big Ten), despite playing a good portion of the season without injured (knee) All-American guard Ronnie Lester. With Lester out, Guard Kenny Arnold had stayed in the line-up and played the entire season with a broken right thumb, leading the team in total points and assists with the injury. Freshman Bobby Hansen played after breaking a bone in his left hand and fellow freshman Mark Gannon was lost for the season with a knee injury. Iowa was also without Assistant Coach Tony McAndrews, who had been in a plane crash mid-season after a recruiting trip. He survived, but was badly injured and did not return to coaching that season.

Lester returned for the end of the regular season and the tournament. In the NCAA, Iowa received a #5 seed in the East Regional. They beat Virginia Commonwealth (86–72), North Carolina State (77–64) and #1 seed Syracuse (88–77). In the East Regional Final, Iowa was down by as many in 14 in the second half, before rallying to defeat Georgetown (81–80) on a last second basket and free-throw by Steve Waite to advance to the Final Four.

In the NCAA Semi-Final, Lester injured his knee early in the game, after scoring 10 of Iowa's first 12 points. He did not return and Iowa fell to eventual NCAA champion Louisville 80–72. When Olson was asked years later about Iowa's chances to win the NCAA Tournament had Lester not been injured, "My feeling was yes, I feel we could have won," Olson said. "That was a fun team to coach." Overall, Iowa was 15–1 with Lester fully in the lineup and 8–9 in his absence.

After leading the Hawkeyes to the Final Four, Olson's Iowa teams made the next three NCAA Tournaments, advancing to the Sweet Sixteen in 1983, his final season at Iowa. Nicknamed "The House That Lute Built", Carver-Hawkeye Arena, a facility Olson had envisioned for the future of the university, opened on January 5, 1983, against Michigan State. Iowa had played in the antiquated Iowa Fieldhouse. After the season, Olson left Iowa for the University of Arizona.

=== University of Arizona (1983–2007) ===
Olson surprised many by leaving Iowa for an Arizona program that had just suffered the worst season in school history, having won only four games all season and one game in Pac-10 play. He said he left Iowa because life there had become a "fishbowl" and he needed a change.

Under Olson, Arizona quickly rose to national prominence. In only his second year, the Wildcats notched their first winning season in six years and made the first of what would be 23 consecutive NCAA Tournament appearances under his watch. A year later, Arizona won its first Pac-10 title. Two years later, the Wildcats spent much of the season ranked #1 and made their first (and Olson's second) Final Four. Olson's subsequent Arizona teams would be fixtures in the Top 25 for most of the time until the mid-2000s.

Olson was voted Pac-10 Coach of the Year seven times, made 5 Final Four appearances and won the 1997 NCAA championship with Arizona, where his team accomplished the feat of defeating three #1 seeds in the same tournament.

In 2002, Olson was inducted into the Basketball Hall of Fame.

He also coached the US national team in the 1986 FIBA World Championship, the last all-collegiate US basketball team to win in international competition. His team defeated the USSR 87–85 in the gold medal game, the first time the US had won the world championship in 32 years.

==== Players developed at Arizona ====
Throughout the nineties and 2000s, Arizona under Olson was one of the top producers of NBA talent in terms of number of alumni playing in the league. Many of these players (such as Steve Kerr, Mike Bibby, Jason Terry, and Gilbert Arenas) were not highly regarded on a national level in high school but flourished under Olson's system to eventually become college stars and productive NBA players.

The basketball program at Arizona has been dubbed "Point Guard U" because of the numerous players who have excelled at that position, including Damon Stoudamire, Kerr, Bibby, and Terry. Additionally, point guards Reggie Geary and Matt Othick both played briefly in the NBA and Kenny Lofton went on to become an All-Star center fielder in Major League Baseball. All-American Jason Gardner (graduated in 2003), had been the only starting Arizona point guard to not have played any NBA minutes since before Steve Kerr in 1984, prior to Mustafa Shakur and Chris Rodgers in recent years.

Despite this reputation, Arizona under Olson has also developed many notable shooting guards and swingmen: Sean Elliott, Gilbert Arenas, Jud Buechler, Khalid Reeves, Miles Simon, Michael Dickerson, Chris Mills, Richard Jefferson, Luke Walton, Andre Iguodala, Salim Stoudamire, Michael Wright, Ray Owes and Hassan Adams. Many went on to stardom in the NBA.

Fewer Arizona big men have made such a big impact in the NBA, but Olson has coached several notables: forward Tom Tolbert and centers Brian Williams (later renamed Bison Dele), Sean Rooks, Loren Woods, and Channing Frye have also made careers in the NBA.

== Personal life ==
Olson married Roberta "Bobbi" Russell in 1953. They were married for 47 years and had five children. Bobbi Olson died on January 1, 2001, of ovarian cancer, aged 65. The basketball court at UA is named the Lute and Bobbi Olson Court in her honor.

In 2003, Olson married Christine Jack Toretti. On December 6, 2007, Olson filed for divorce from her.

Olson married his 3rd wife in April 2010.

On March 15, 2005, Olson's granddaughter, Julie Brase, is a coach in the WNBA. On March 23, 2026, Julie Brase is an assistant coach for the Arizona Wildcats women's basketball team.

Olson's grandson Matt Brase was a basketball player at Arizona from 2003 to 2005 and is an assistant coach for the Philadelphia 76ers.

== Health issues ==
=== Controversies and absences ===
Olson's behavior became erratic in 2007, beginning with the dismissal of 27-year associate head coach Jim Rosborough in April 2007. It is widely believed that Olson had promised Rosborough the head coach position when Olson retired. Olson replaced Rosborough with former Toronto Raptors head coach Kevin O'Neill.

On November 4, 2007, Olson was absent from the Wildcats' preseason opener. It was announced 10 minutes prior to the game that he would be taking an indefinite leave of absence. At the time, the university said such absence was not health related. O'Neill took over head-coaching duties during the leave of absence.

On December 6, 2007, it was announced that Olson would miss the entire 2007–08 season. The following day, it was announced that Olson had filed for divorce from his wife of four years, Christine. On December 18, Arizona announced that Olson planned to return for the 2008–09 season, and also named O'Neill as Olson's designated successor upon his retirement.

O'Neill publicly stated that he was still relying on a promise to be Olson's successor, and that he would return to UA to be an assistant for the 2008–09 season. However, during an April 2008 press conference in which he appeared visibly annoyed and defensive with reporters, Olson announced that O'Neill would not return to Arizona's staff for the 2008–09 season. This marked the second time in a year that Olson had reneged on a promise to promote an assistant coach, following his dismissal of Jim Rosborough. O'Neill later accepted an assistant coaching position with the Memphis Grizzlies of the NBA, and was subsequently the head coach at USC. Arizona athletic director Jim Livengood also said assistant and former Wildcat guard Miles Simon (a key player on Olson's 1997 national championship team) would no longer coach.

=== Retirement from coaching ===
Olson met with the Tucson media during Arizona's annual preseason media day on October 21; in contrast to his April appearance, he seemed in relatively upbeat and positive spirits and ready to coach in 2008. However, Olson did not attend the October 22 practice, which was run by associate head coach Mike Dunlap, and missed a Rotary Club function in Tucson which he attended annually for many years (former Wildcat point guard Reggie Geary, by now a member of the coaching staff, attended the event on Olson's behalf). After a day of speculation fueled by initial reports by Dick Vitale of ESPN, Livengood formally announced Olson's retirement the afternoon of October 23. Livengood would not speculate on Olson's permanent replacement; it was widely assumed Dunlap would coach the team on an interim basis. The interim coach was announced by Livengood on October 24 to be Russ Pennell, who joined the Wildcat staff in May 2008.

On October 28, 2008, five days after Olson announced his retirement, Olson's personal physician, Steven D. Knope, held a press conference in Tucson alongside Olson's daughters and grandson, in which he showed signs of emotion at times; Olson himself was not in attendance. Knope, who in March had cleared Olson medically to return to coaching after his leave of absence, announced that the coach had an "initially undiagnosed" stroke earlier in the year (confirmed by an MRI scan taken on October 27) which had caused severe depression and impaired judgment. Olson had also apparently suffered from atrial fibrillation for several years, which could have produced a blood clot resulting in the stroke. Knope became concerned about "changes in (Olson's) behavior and trouble handling his increasing workload" and advised Olson to retire as a result:

"I believe some of those personality changes were out of character," Knope said. "I had very little contact with him this summer. I saw his (April 1) press conference and noticed that he was a little out of character...What I'm truly hoping for now is that the team and community rally around this now that they understand...I hope everyone remembers what he's done for the community."

Knope said that Olson was "devastated" upon being informed of the MRI results and remained at home in Tucson; Olson declined to comment publicly on his condition. Knope further clarified his position for the Arizona Daily Star a few days later:

"During his initial bout of depression in November 2007, Olson responded appropriately to medications. He had a complete recovery from his depression. He had no unusual behavior at that time and there was no indication for an MRI. The results of an MRI performed at that time would likely have been normal. During Olson's more recent depression, which began approximately six weeks ago, Olson did not respond to therapy. This was a change. The medications were no longer effective. In addition, there were behaviors in recent months which, in retrospect, were uncharacteristic of the man. These were the clues that suggested he may have a rare frontal lobe syndrome, in which behavioral changes, judgmental errors and difficulty with complex tasks became prominent. These symptoms were the red flags that triggered the need for an MRI (which confirmed the stroke)".

=== Retirement activities ===
In retirement, Olson visited the University of Iowa on numerous occasions, calling it "a special place" to him, having been inducted into the Iowa Athletics Hall of Fame in 2000. Among his visits: on October 26, 2009, Olson and members of the 1980 Final Four team were honored at Iowa's Kinnick Stadium and had a Final Four Weekend Reunion together with their families. On September 9, 2015, he visited with players and Iowa Coach Fran McCaffery, attending a football game and holding a brief press conference to talk about his memories. On December 8, 2016, Olson attended the Iowa-Iowa State basketball game at Carver-Hawkeye Arena in Iowa City, alongside his former Iowa player Ronnie Lester. Olson and Lester spoke with the press before the game and told stories.

Over time, Olson, Lester, Iowa teammates and fans contributed to help Kenny Arnold, who was the second leading scorer and assist leader for the Hawkeye Final Four squad in 1980. Arnold was first diagnosed with brain cancer in 1985 and his healthcare needs have continued. At one point, Olson arranged for Arnold to be flown to Arizona so he could be examined and treated at the facilities where Olson's wife Bobbi had once undergone cancer treatment. Teammates Ronnie Lester and Mike "Tree" Henry accompanied Arnold. The trip was deemed to be beneficial to Arnold's health.

On April 12, 2018, Olson was honored by the University of Arizona, who erected a statue of him outside the McKale Center on campus. The unveiling was attended by many former Arizona players as well as Olson's family. When the statue was unveiled, Olson remarked, "They got the hair right." Olson spoke and answered questions from fans and media, stating "This means the world to me."

At home in Arizona, Olson told reporters that he aimed to attend all home Arizona basketball games, and traveled to road games at California and UCLA. He also attended some NBA games to see his former Arizona players Steve Kerr (Golden State Warriors) and Luke Walton (Sacramento Kings) coach their respective NBA teams.

Olson also played more golf than before, "If I were lucky I might get in 10 rounds of golf a year when I was coaching," he said. "Now I play all the time."

=== Death ===
Olson was hospitalized in 2019 after suffering a stroke, and was moved into hospice care in August 2020. On August 27, 2020, Olson died at the age of 85.

== Legacy ==
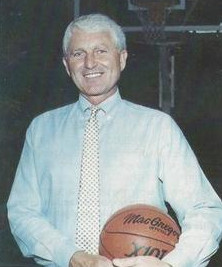
Olson, circa 1987

Lute Olson is regarded as one of the greatest coaches in the history of college basketball. Along with the successful players noted above, Olson has 46 NCAA tournament wins, one behind John Wooden and one ahead of Bob Knight. His Wildcat basketball teams were wildly popular in Tucson, among university students as well as the general public; Olson brought a renewed sense of prestige to both the University of Iowa and University of Arizona at a time when both of their sports programs were mediocre. In November 2007, Olson teamed with publisher Mascot Books to release a children's book featuring the Arizona mascot touring the campus, entitled Hello, Wilbur!.

Upon his retirement, accolades came in from several sources. Robert Shelton, University of Arizona president, said, "Lute Olson transformed the UA and Tucson into premier basketball country...Arizona now stands in the company of great college basketball programs, and we have Lute to thank for that. We will sorely miss his brilliance as our head coach, but we will benefit from the legacy he leaves for decades to come."

Kevin O'Neill, the man originally tapped to replace Olson as Arizona head coach, but who later left the Wildcat program, stated: "I have great respect for Lute Olson. He is one of the greatest college basketball coaches of all time...His legacy will (be) the standard at the University of Arizona for as long as they have basketball. I appreciate every opportunity he gave me."

"He's been involved in the game and been a great ambassador for college basketball for a long time," former University of Florida head basketball coach Billy Donovan said. "There's no question he went through a difficult time and I don't know all that went on. He took over Arizona at rock bottom and built it into an incredible program...For him, maybe dealing with health issues and family issues, for whatever reason, it's not right for him to continue on. And I just hope he's at peace with where he's at in his decision."

Greg Hansen, columnist and longtime Olson critic for the Arizona Daily Star in Tucson, had this to say: "Until now, Lute Olson has been judged by games won and banners hung, but it is the passage of time that will be his greatest test. Ultimately, it won't matter that he didn't beat Purdue in the last game he ever coached, that his final recruiting class went bust or that he abandoned his school twice at the worst possible time. As the games fade away, the future will paint a flattering portrait of him...Across the last quarter-century, Olson made our city feel good about itself. He made us feel like winners. Who else has done that? He changed the way we looked at ourselves."

In 2000, Olson received the Golden Plate Award of the American Academy of Achievement.

On February 11, 2012, Olson was initiated into the Pi Kappa Alpha International Fraternity by Gamma Delta Chapter at the University of Arizona. He was chosen as a special initiate due to his loyalty to the University of Arizona and his dedication he showed to his players.

Olson is the namesake of The Lute Olson Award. Beginning in 2010, The Lute Olson Award is presented annually to the nation's top Division I player in College Basketball and is selected by a 30-member committee. The recipient is announced annually at the site on NCAA Final Four. Recipients are selected off a preseason watchlist that is narrowed to finalists in March.

Olson would again be re-inducted into the National Collegiate Basketball Hall of Fame with the 2019 class.

== Coaching highlights ==
- Compiled a 180–76 record (.703) coaching high school basketball

At Long Beach City College

- Three time Metro Conference Coach of the Year (1970, 1971, 1973)
- Led LBCC to three Metro Conference titles (1970, 1971, 1973)
- Led LBCC to California JUCO State Championship (1971)

At Long Beach State University

- PCAA Coach of the Year (1974)
- Western Region Coach of the Year (1974)
- Led Long Beach State to Big West Championship (1974)

At the University of Iowa

- Two time Big Ten Coach of the Year (1979, 1981)
- Led Iowa to Big Ten Championship (1979)
- Led Iowa to NCAA Final Four (1980)
- Led Iowa to 5 consecutive trips to the NCAA tournament to finish his career there, a record at the time
- Left Iowa as the winningest coach in school history with a 168–90 record (.651)

At the University of Arizona

- Seven time Pac-10 Coach of the Year (1986, 1988, 1989, 1993, 1994, 1998, 2003)
- Led Arizona to 11 Pac-10 championships (1986, 1988, 1989, 1990, 1991, 1993, 1994, 1998, 2000, 2003, 2005)
- Led Arizona to 20 consecutive 20-win seasons
- Averaged nearly 25 victories per year in over 20 years at Arizona
- Owns second best winning percentage (.764) in Pac-10 history (327–101), behind John Wooden (.810)
- Has more Pac-10 wins (327) than any other coach in history, including John Wooden, who coached before UCLA joined the modern Pac-10
- Led Arizona to four NCAA Final Four appearances (1988, 1994, 1997, 2001) and one NCAA Championship (1997)
- Arizona's 1997 team is the only one in NCAA history to beat three No. 1 seeds in the same tournament
- While at Arizona, one of only five head coaches in NCAA history to record 26 or more 20-win seasons
- Guided Arizona to 11 NCAA Sweet 16 appearances in 18 years
- Arizona's 25 consecutive NCAA Tournament appearances (23 under Lute Olson) is the second longest streak in NCAA history (behind North Carolina's 27)

NCAA tournament records

- Third in NCAA tournament games coached with 74
- Fourth in NCAA tournament wins with 46
- Compiled a 25–12 (.676) record in his last 35 NCAA Tournament games
- 28 of his last 29 teams have advanced to the NCAA Tournament (23 straight at Arizona and 5 straight at Iowa)

Career records

- One of 8 coaches in collegiate history to coach in five or more Final Fours
- One of 11 coaches who have taken two different teams to the Final Four
- Averaged nearly 23 victories per year in over 30 years of coaching
- Achieved 29 winning seasons in over 30 years of coaching
- In 34 seasons as a Division I head coach, compiled a 781–280 record (.736)

Awards

- U.S. Coach, R. William Jones Cup Champions (1984)
- U.S. Coach, World Championship Gold Medal (1986)
- National Coach of the Year (1988, 1990)
- CBS-TV Coach of the Year (1989)
- USBWA District 8 Coach of the Year (1988, 1993)
- NABC District 15 Coach of the Year (1989, 1993, 1994)
- Basketball Times West Region Coach of the Year (1998)
- Naismith National Coach of the Year Finalist (1998)

== Head coaching record ==
=== Junior college ===
Record table
Season	Team	Overall	Conference	Standing	Postseason
Long Beach City College (Metropolitan Conference) (1969–1973)
1969–70	LBCC			1st	
1970–71	LBCC			1st	
1971–72	LBCC				
1972–73	LBCC			1st	
LBCC:		103-22			
Total:		103-22			
National champion Postseason invitational champion Conference regular season champion Conference regular season and conference tournament champion Division regular season champion Division regular season and conference tournament champion Conference tournament champion

=== College ===
Record table
Season	Team	Overall	Conference	Standing	Postseason
Long Beach State 49ers (Pacific Coast Athletic Association) (1973–1974)
1973–74	Long Beach State	24–2	12–0	1st	
Long Beach State:		24–2 (.923)	12–0 (1.000)		
Iowa Hawkeyes (Big Ten Conference) (1974–1983)
1974–75	Iowa	10–16	7–11	7th	
1975–76	Iowa	19–10	9–9	5th	
1976–77	Iowa	20–7	12–6	4th	
1977–78	Iowa	12–15	5–13	8th	
1978–79	Iowa	20–8	13–5	1st	NCAA Division I first round
1979–80	Iowa	23–10	10–8	4th	NCAA Division I Final Four
1980–81	Iowa	21–7	13–5	2nd	NCAA Division I first round
1981–82	Iowa	21–8	12–6	2nd	NCAA Division I second round
1982–83	Iowa	21–10	10–8	T–2nd	NCAA Division I Sweet 16
Iowa:		167–91 (.647)	91–71 (.562)		
Arizona Wildcats (Pacific-10 Conference) (1983–2008)
1983–84	Arizona	11–17	8–10	8th	
1984–85	Arizona	21–10	12–6	T–3rd	NCAA Division I first round
1985–86	Arizona	23–9	14–4	1st	NCAA Division I first round
1986–87	Arizona	18–12	13–5	2nd	NCAA Division I first round
1987–88	Arizona	35–3	17–1	1st	NCAA Division I Final Four
1988–89	Arizona	29–4	17–1	1st	NCAA Division I Sweet 16
1989–90	Arizona	25–7	15–3	T–1st	NCAA Division I second round
1990–91	Arizona	28–7	14–4	1st	NCAA Division I Sweet 16
1991–92	Arizona	24–7	13–5	3rd	NCAA Division I first round
1992–93	Arizona	24–4	17–1	1st	NCAA Division I first round
1993–94	Arizona	29–6	14–4	1st	NCAA Division I Final Four
1994–95	Arizona	24–7	14–4	2nd	NCAA Division I first round
1995–96	Arizona	27–6	14–4	2nd	NCAA Division I Sweet 16
1996–97	Arizona	25–9	11–7	5th	NCAA Division I champion
1997–98	Arizona	30–5	17–1	1st	NCAA Division I Elite Eight
1998–99	Arizona	22–6	13–5	2nd	NCAA Division I first round*
1999–00	Arizona	27–7	15–3	T–1st	NCAA Division I second round
2000–01	Arizona	28–8	15–3	2nd	NCAA Division I Runner-up
2001–02	Arizona	24–10	12–6	T–2nd	NCAA Division I Sweet 16
2002–03	Arizona	28–4	17–1	1st	NCAA Division I Elite Eight
2003–04	Arizona	20–10	11–7	3rd	NCAA Division I first round
2004–05	Arizona	30–7	15–3	1st	NCAA Division I Elite Eight
2005–06	Arizona	20–13	11–7	T–4th	NCAA Division I second round
2006–07	Arizona	20–11	11–7	T–3rd	NCAA Division I first round
Arizona:		589–187 (.759)	327–101 (.764)		
Total:		780–280 (.736)			
National champion Postseason invitational champion Conference regular season champion Conference regular season and conference tournament champion Division regular season champion Division regular season and conference tournament champion Conference tournament champion

* Vacated 1 NCAA tournament loss

== See also ==
- FIBA Basketball World Cup winning head coaches
- List of college men's basketball coaches with 600 wins
- List of NCAA Division I Men's Final Four appearances by coach
