= Oyay Deng Ajak =

South Sudanese politician

Oyay Deng Ajak (born 16 October 1962) is a South Sudanese politician. He is the former the chief of staff of the National Army, the minister for investment in the Cabinet of South Sudan, as well as minister of national security. He was appointed to that position on 10 July 2011. In 2014, he was charged with attempting a coup against the Government of South Sudan, but the charges were suspended. He is currently occupied in advocating for peace and responsible governance in South Sudan.

== See also ==
- SPLM
- SPLA
- Cabinet of South Sudan
