= Ajak Magot =

South Sudanese basketball player

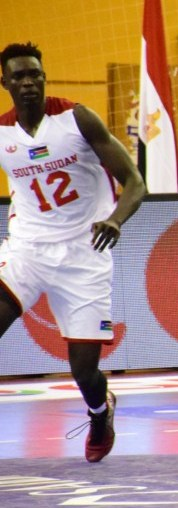
- Magot with South Sudan in 2017

Free agent
- Position: Center

Personal information
- Born: 3 March 1992 (age 34)
- Listed height: 6 ft 11 in (2.11 m)

Career information
- College: Idaho State (2013–2015)
- Playing career: 2015–present

Career history
- 2016–2017: H.R. Portviejo

Ajak Ateng Magot Anok (born 3 March 1992) is a South Sudanese professional basketball player for H.R. Portviejo of the Liga Ecuatoriana de Baloncesto in Ecuador.

He played for the South Sudanese national basketball team at the FIBA AfroBasket 2017 qualifiers.
