= Archie Marshall (basketball) =

American basketball player (born 1965)

Personal information
- Born: April 17, 1965 (age 61) Tulsa, Oklahoma, U.S.
- Listed height: 6 ft 7 in (2.01 m)
- Listed weight: 190 lb (86 kg)

Career information
- High school: Edison (Tulsa, Oklahoma)
- College: Seminole State (1983–1984); Kansas (1985–1988)
- NBA draft: 1988: 3rd round, 75th overall pick
- Drafted by: San Antonio Spurs
- Position: Small forward

Career highlights
- NCAA champion (1988)
- Stats at Basketball Reference

Archie Marshall (born April 17, 1965) is an American former basketball player, known for his college career with the Kansas Jayhawks, where he was a member of their 1988 national championship team.

A small forward from Tulsa, Oklahoma, Marshall was a standout at Edison Preparatory School, earning state player of the year honors from the Oklahoma Coaches Association as a senior. He signed with Seminole State College in Seminole, Oklahoma, joining fellow Tulsan Anthony Bowie on coach Jim Kerwin's last team. Marshall averaged 16.7 points per game for the Trojans in the 1983–84 season. Following his sole junior college season, Marshall left the school and enrolled at the University of Kansas, ultimately committing to play basketball for the Jayhawks.

Marshall made his Jayhawk debut in the 1985–86 season, becoming a key rotation player for the team and averaging 7 points and 3.9 rebounds per game. The team went 35–4 on the season, winning both the Big Eight Conference regular season and tournament titles. The team ultimately advanced to the Final Four of the 1986 NCAA tournament. In the Jayhawks' semifinal game against Duke, Marshall tore his left Anterior cruciate ligament on a breakaway layup. The injury was severe and caused Marshall to sit out the 1986–87 season as he healed from the surgery to repair the knee.

After his season off to rehab, Marshall rejoined the Jayhawks for the 1987–88 season. He entered the starting lineup and led the Jayhawks to an 8–2 start before injuring his right knee in a December game against St. John's, effectively ending his season. The team struggled with the loss of one of their best players, ultimately losing 5 out of 6 games in an early 1988 stretch. Marshall's season was over until coach Larry Brown surprised the crowd by inserting Marshall at the end of the team's last regular season game to get a last college appearance. Marshall took and missed a 40-foot jump shot while still encumbered by a leg brace and with very limited mobility. The new look Jayhawks adapted to Marshall's absence and ultimately went on a run behind All-American Danny Manning to win the 1988 national championship. Marshall served as motivation and inspiration for the team, with Manning writing Marshall's number 23 on his wristbands and the team dedicating its run to their injured teammate.

Following the close of his college career, Marshall was drafted by Brown, now head coach of the San Antonio Spurs, with the last pick (third round, 75th pick overall) of the 1988 NBA draft. However, he did not play in the National Basketball Association. He played a season in Australia in 1990 for Wangaratta of the Big V.
