= Oklahoma Sooners men's basketball =

Men's basketball team of the University of Oklahoma

2026–27 Oklahoma Sooners men's basketball team
- University: University of Oklahoma
- First season: 1908–09 (118 years ago)
- Athletic director: Roger Denny
- Head coach: Porter Moser; 6th season, 93–74 (.557)
- Location: Norman, Oklahoma
- Arena: Lloyd Noble Center (capacity: 10,890)
- NCAA division: Division I
- Conference: SEC
- Nickname: Sooners
- Colors: Crimson and cream
- Student section: Boom Squad
- All-time record: 1,813–1,180 (.606)
- NCAA tournament record: 43–34 (.558)

NCAA Division I tournament runner-up
- 1947, 1988
Other NCAA Division I tournament results
Final Four	1939, 1947, 1988, 2002, 2016
Elite Eight	1939, 1943, 1947, 1985, 1988, 2002, 2003, 2009, 2016
Sweet Sixteen	1979, 1985, 1987, 1988, 1989, 1999, 2002, 2003, 2009, 2015, 2016
Appearances	1939, 1943, 1947, 1979, 1983, 1984, 1985, 1986, 1987, 1988, 1989, 1990, 1992, 1995, 1996, 1997, 1998, 1999, 2000, 2001, 2002, 2003, 2005, 2006, 2008, 2009, 2013, 2014, 2015, 2016, 2018, 2019, 2021, 2025

Conference tournament champions
- Big Eight: 1979, 1985, 1988, 1990 Big 12: 2001, 2002, 2003

Conference regular-season champions
- MVIAA: 1928 Big Eight: 1929, 1939, 1940, 1942, 1944, 1947, 1949, 1979, 1984, 1985, 1988, 1989, 2005

Uniforms
Home	Away

The Oklahoma Sooners men's basketball team represents the University of Oklahoma in intercollegiate men's basketball. The program competes in the Southeastern Conference (SEC) in Division I of the National Collegiate Athletic Association (NCAA). The Sooners play their home games at the Lloyd Noble Center in Norman, Oklahoma. Oklahoma has won 14 conference championships, 7 conference tournaments. The team has participated in five Final Fours, and holds the record for most NCAA tournament wins without a championship. As of the 2022 season, they are tied for 12th all-time in NCAA tournament appearances. In addition to their tournament successes the program has produced 33 All-Americans including Wayman Tisdale, Stacey King, Harvey Grant, Mookie Blaylock, Ryan Minor, Hollis Price, Buddy Hield, and Blake Griffin, 9 first round draft picks, including one No. 1 pick (Blake Griffin) and four National Players of the Year: Vic Holt (1928), Gerald Tucker (1947), Blake Griffin (2009) and Buddy Hield (2016).

== History ==
=== 1908–80 ===
The Sooners enjoyed moderate success on the court during this era, posting just 16 losing records in their first 72 seasons. They were led by 9 different coaches during this period, beginning with Bennie Owen (who also coached the football team) and ending with Dave Bliss in 1980. The Sooners participated in the very first Final Four in 1939. OU made a second appearance in the championship game in 1947, losing 47–58 to Holy Cross.

=== 1981–1994 (the Billy Tubbs era) ===
The program gained national prominence under Billy Tubbs when he took over in 1981. Star players Wayman Tisdale, Mookie Blaylock, and Stacey King guided the Sooners to several deep runs in the NCAA tournament. In 1988, the Sooners reached the NCAA title game in Kansas City, where they fell four points shy of their first national title to the 11-loss Kansas Jayhawks, a team which they had beaten twice in regular season play.

Tubbs resigned on April 10, 1994, indicating that "he did not feel appreciated enough working at a football school" (he later reconciled with the administration and enjoyed a healthy relationship with the school up until his death from leukemia in 2020). Tubbs' base salary at Oklahoma in his final season was $107,000 annually. Tubbs, 59 years old at the time, left to take over the struggling Texas Christian University basketball program, signing a 5-year contract worth between $200,000 and $400,000 per season.

Tubbs' record at OU was 333–132 (0.716) overall, 126–70 (0.643) conference, with 10 NCAA tournament appearances, one Final Four appearance, and one National Title Game appearance. Tubbs finished with 5 Big 8 regular season titles and 2 Conference tournament titles.

Tubbs averaged 24 wins per season (24–9) and 9 conference wins per season (9–5).

=== 1995–2006 (the Kelvin Sampson era) ===
Kelvin Sampson became the 11th head coach at the University of Oklahoma on April 25, 1994. Sampson was named national coach of the year in 1995 (his first year at OU) by the Associated Press, United States Basketball Writers Association and Basketball Weekly after guiding the Sooners to 23–9 overall and 15–0 home marks. It was the second-best overall record posted by a first-year coach in Big 8 history. Sampson possesses the highest winning percentage in Oklahoma history (.719). He guided OU to nine consecutive 20-win seasons. He averaged 24.4 wins over those nine campaigns. He directed the Sooners to postseason tournament berths in each of his 12 seasons (11 NCAA tournaments), with a Sweet 16 showing in 1999, a Final Four appearance in 2002 and an Elite Eight appearance in 2003. His teams also played in the Big 12 Tournament title game on five occasions during the 10 seasons he coached in the Big 12. In 2001, 2002, and 2003 the Sooners won that tournament. Sampson finished with a Big 12 Tournament record of 17–7. Standouts Eduardo Nájera and Hollis Price helped the Sooners maintain a streak of 25 straight post season appearances, the longest in the nation. Sampson left OU in 2006 to take a head job at Indiana.

Sampson's record at OU was 279–109 (0.719) overall, 128–60 (0.681) conference, with 11 NCAA tournament Appearances, including one Final Four appearance. In the Big 12, Sampson had 3 Conference tournament Titles and 1 Conference regular season Title. During his final season at OU, Sampson's salary was approximately $900,000 annually, not including bonuses. Sampson left OU in 2006 to become the head basketball coach at Indiana University, signing a 7-year, $10.5 million contract, at $1.5 million per season.

Under Sampson's watch, Oklahoma was placed under a three-year investigation by the NCAA for recruiting violations. At the end of their investigation, the NCAA issued a report citing more than 550 illegal calls made by Sampson and his staff to 17 different recruits. The NCAA barred Sampson from recruiting off campus and making phone calls for one year, ending May 24, 2007.

Sampson averaged 23 wins per season (23–9) and 11 conference wins per season (11–5).

=== 2006–2011 (the Jeff Capel era) ===
On April 11, 2006, Jeff Capel was named the 12th head basketball coach at Oklahoma, succeeding Kelvin Sampson. Though the Sooner Nation as a whole greeted Capel's hiring with optimism, one notable downside of the coaching change emerged—Sampson's departure caused three of the players who had signed with OU (once considered a top-five recruiting class) to rethink each's decision to attend OU. Scottie Reynolds went on to Villanova, and Damion James to Texas. Capel was originally signed to a four-year, $3 million contract, at $750,000 annually.

In his first year, after going 8–4 in non-conference games, with losses to Memphis, Purdue, Villanova, and Alabama, the Sooners started 6–3 in conference play, before losing their final 7 conference games. After winning only one game in the Big 12 Conference tournament, losing to eventual conference tournament champion Kansas, the Sooners missed any form of postseason play, which snapped the nation's longest streak of 25 consecutive years in the postseason, starting with Billy Tubbs' second year in 1982 and ending with Kelvin Sampson's final year in 2006.

In his second year, after signing McDonald's All-American Forward Blake Griffin, the Sooners finished 21–10 during the regular season (9–7 in Big 12 play) earning them a No. 4 seed in the Big 12 Tournament, where they won one game before losing to Texas in the semi-finals. They received a No. 6 seed in the NCAA tournament, where they defeated St. Joseph's in the first round before losing to No. 3 seed Louisville in the second round, finishing the season at 23–12, an improvement of 7 wins over the previous season. After this successful second season, Capel's name began to surface among many head coaching vacancies. In an effort to keep Capel, OU Athletic Director Joe Castiglione and the OU Board of Regents extended Capel's contract through 2014, and increased his salary to $1.05 million per year.

Player of the Year Candidate Blake Griffin announced he would be returning for his sophomore season, forgoing a possible lottery-pick status in the NBA draft. Coupled with the signing of another McDonald's All-American guard in Willie Warren, the 2008–2009 season looked to be promising.

The team experienced one of the best starts in school history at 25–1, until Griffin was sidelined with a concussion during the first half of the OU–Texas game on February 21, 2009. The Sooners went on to lose consecutive games for the first time all season, to Texas by 5 in Austin and Kansas by 9 in Norman. Without their star player, the Sooners fell short. Griffin returned to the lineup on February 28, 2009, and the Sooners returned to their winning ways defeating Texas Tech by 15 in Lubbock on 2/28/09, before losing on the road to Missouri, who was undefeated at home, and finishing the regular season by sweeping in-state rival Oklahoma State, who had won 7 of their previous 8 games. After a first-round bye in the Big 12 Tournament, the 2nd-seeded Sooners lost to the 7th-seeded Cowboys by 1 point during the final seconds of the game.

Capel's Sooners were granted a No. 2 seed for the NCAA tournament, and easily beat No. 15 seed Morgan State in the first round, #10 seed Michigan in the second round, and #3 seed Syracuse in the Sweet 16, whose vaunted 2–3 zone defense did nothing to slow down the Sooners' hot shooting from the perimeter. However, after hitting nine three-pointers during the previous game with Syracuse, the Sooner guards went 0/15 from beyond the arc during the first 35 minutes of their Elite 8 game against North Carolina, before finishing 2–19 in the game. This ultimately led to their demise by the Tar Heels on March 29, losing 60–72. Unanimous All-American Forward and Player of the Year Blake Griffin finished the tournament with 114 points and 60 rebounds, becoming the first player to accomplish such a feat in over 40 years. Griffin, who gave up his final two years of eligibility to enter the NBA draft, and was the #1 pick. The Sooners finished Capel's third season at 30–6, the school's first 30+ win season since 2002, and 2th overall. This was again an improvement of 7 wins over the previous season.

Even with the loss of starters Austin Johnson, Taylor Griffin, and Blake Griffin, the Sooners had two incoming McDonald's All-American recruits in point guard Tommy Mason-Griffin and center Keith "Tiny" Gallon. Paired with returning McDonald's All-American guard Willie Warren, guard Tony Crocker, and former reserve forward Ryan Wright, the Sooners had a chance to post yet another successful season and were poised make another deep run into the NCAA tournament. This was the first time in the school's history where they had three McDonald's All-Americans on the roster at the same time.

Despite high hopes and a preseason ranking of No. 16, Jeff Capel and his Sooners proved to be one of the most overrated teams in the 2009–2010 season. After a mediocre 13–9 start, their season slipped away as they lost their last nine games of the season, including a first-round loss to Oklahoma State in the Big 12 tournament, leaving them with a 13–18 record to cap off the season. Those wins were vacated in November 2011 after various violations that included improper benefits and ineligible players.

Capel's record at OU was 83–69 (0.546) overall, 33–43 (0.463) in conference (with 13 total wins and 4 conference wins having been vacated), with 2 NCAA tournament Appearances, and one Elite Eight appearance. In the Big 12, Capel did not win a Conference tournament title or regular season title.

Capel finished 2010–11 with a 14–18 record and a loss to the Texas Longhorns in the 2011 Big 12 Tournament. On March 14, 2011, he was fired as head coach of the Sooners.

In November 2011, the NCAA punished Oklahoma with three years probation, a $15,000 fine, reductions in recruiting, the loss of a scholarship, and vacation of all wins for the 2009–10 season.

=== 2011–2021 (the Lon Kruger era) ===
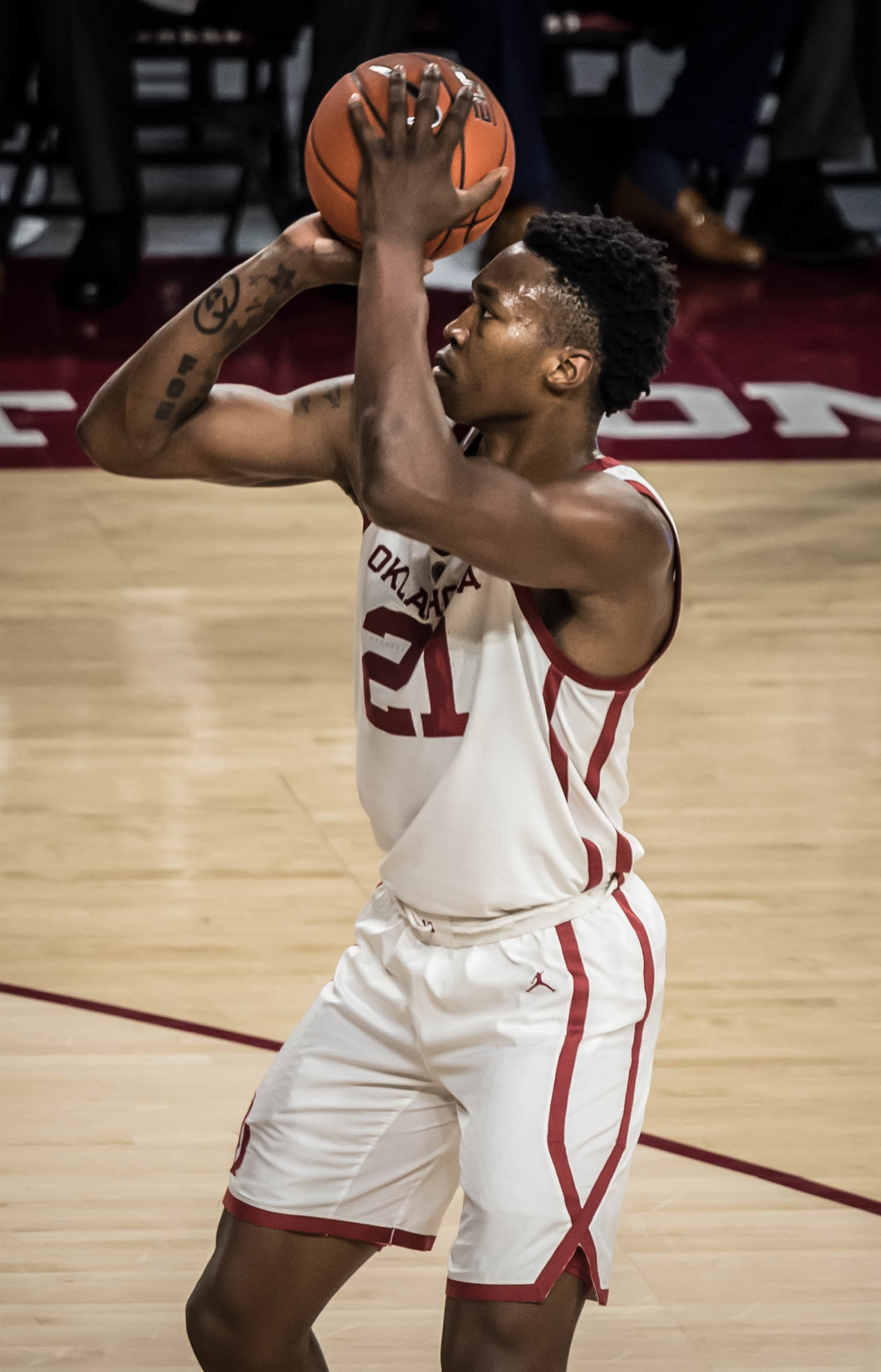
Kristian Doolittle

Lon Kruger was hired by OU to replace Jeff Capel as head coach prior to the 2011–12 season. Kruger had previously coached at Kansas State, Florida, Illinois and UNLV. In his first season at helm, the Sooners finished 15–16, improving on their 2010–11 finish.

The 2012–13 season yielded a surprising 20–12 (11–7 Big 12, 4th) finish and resulted in the program's first NCAA tournament bid since Blake Griffin led the school to the Elite 8 in 2009. However, the Sooners were defeated in the second round of the NCAA tournament by San Diego State.

The 2013–14 season continued this trend of improvement, as the Sooners finished 23–10 overall (12–6 Big 12, 2nd). However, they were again upset in the second round of the NCAA tournament, falling to North Dakota State.

4 of the 5 starters from the 2013–14 team returned for the 2014–15 season. Guard Buddy Hield was Big 12 player of the year as OU made it to the Big 12 tournament semifinals before Iowa State bounced them out. Oklahoma received a #3 seed in the East region of the NCAA tournament, made it to the Sweet Sixteen by beating little regarded Albany and Dayton, but couldn't advance to the regional final (Elite Eight) as Michigan State held on 62–58.

In the 2015–2016 season, Oklahoma finished 24–6 in the regular season, and despite losing to West Virginia in the Big 12 Tournament's second round, received a #2 seed in the NCAA tournament. Oklahoma easily beat Cal State Bakersfield in the first round, but struggled to finish off VCU in the second round despite an early 21–7 lead. Oklahoma then went on to defeat Texas A&M 77–63 to advance to the west regional final where the Sooners defeated top-seed Oregon 80–68 to advance to the Final Four. Their Final Four opponent was Villanova, also a number two seed who upset Big 12 rival and number one seed Kansas to reach the Final Four. Oklahoma lost to Villanova 95–51 in the national semifinal game.

Lon Kruger is the first coach in history to take 5 different schools to the Sweet Sixteen. He is also the only coach to win a game in the NCAA tournament with 5 different schools.

Kruger retired from coaching on March 25, 2021.

=== 2021–present (the Porter Moser era) ===
On April 3, 2021, the Sooners announced the hiring of Porter Moser, the coach who brought Loyola Chicago to the Final Four in 2018 and had recently coached the Ramblers to a Sweet 16.

== Conference affiliations ==
Oklahoma has been affiliated with the following conferences:

Conference	Years	Reason left
Missouri Valley Intercollegiate Athletic Association	1920–1928	Conference dissolved
Big Six/Seven/Eight Conference	1928–1996	Conference dissolved
Big 12 Conference	1996–2024	Joined SEC
Southeastern Conference	2024–present	

== Coaching staff ==
As of March 19, 2023:

Name	Position coached	Consecutive season at Oklahoma in current position
Porter Moser	Head coach	2nd
Emanuel Dildy	Assistant coach	2nd
Ryan Humphrey	Assistant coach	1st
Tad Glibert	Director of Basketball Operations	1st
Matt Gordon	Special Assistant to the Head Coach and Director of Recruiting	2nd
Clayton Custer	Director of Video Operations and Player Development	2nd
Bryce Daub	Director of Strength and Performance	7th
Dylan Mihalke	Director of Analytics and Assistant Dir. of Video Operations	

== Championships ==
=== Conference regular season ===
Season	Coach	Conference	Overall record	Conference record
1927–28	Hugh McDermott	Missouri Valley Intercollegiate Athletic Association	18–0	18–0
1928–29	Hugh McDermott	Big Six Conference	13–2	10–0
1938–39§	Bruce Drake	Big Six Conference	12–9	7–3
1939–40§	Bruce Drake	Big Six Conference	12–7	8–2
1941–42§	Bruce Drake	Big Six Conference	11–7	8–2
1943–44§	Bruce Drake	Big Six Conference	15–8	9–1
1946–47	Bruce Drake	Big Six Conference	24–7	8–2
1948–49§	Bruce Drake	Big Seven Conference	14–10	9–3
1978–79	Dave Bliss	Big Eight Conference	21–10	10–4
1983–84	Billy Tubbs	Big Eight Conference	24–9	13–1
1984–85	Billy Tubbs	Big Eight Conference	31–6	13–1
1987–88	Billy Tubbs	Big Eight Conference	35–4	12–2
1988–89	Billy Tubbs	Big Eight Conference	30–6	12–2
2004–05§	Kelvin Sampson	Big 12 Conference	25–8	12–4
Conference regular season championships			14	

§ – Conference co-champions

=== Conference tournament championships ===
Year	Coach	Opponent	Score	Site	Conference	Overall record	Conference record
1979	Dave Bliss	Kansas	80–65	Kansas City, Missouri	Big Eight	21–10	10–4
1985	Billy Tubbs	Iowa State	73–71	Kansas City, Missouri	Big Eight	31–6	13–1
1988	Billy Tubbs	Kansas State	73–71	Kansas City, Missouri	Big Eight	35–4	12–2
1990	Billy Tubbs	Colorado	73–71	Kansas City, Missouri	Big Eight	27–5	11–3
2000	Kelvin Sampson	Texas	54–45	Kansas City, Missouri	Big 12	26–7	12–4
2001	Kelvin Sampson	Kansas	64–55	Kansas City, Missouri	Big 12	31–5	13–3
2002	Kelvin Sampson	Missouri	49–47	Dallas, Texas	Big 12	27–7	12–4
Conference tournament championships							7

== Records ==
Career Points

#	Player	Tenure	Points
1	Wayman Tisdale	1982–1985	2,661
2	Buddy Hield	2012–16	2,291
3	Jeff Webster	1991–94	2,281
4	Tim McCalister	1984–87	2,275
5	Darryl Kennedy	1984–87	2,097
6	Stacey King	1986–89	2,008
7	Ryan Minor	1993–96	1,946
8	Hollis Price	2000–03	1,821
9	Alvan Adams	1973–75	1,707
10	Eduardo Nájera	1997–2000	1,646

== Postseason ==
=== NCAA tournament results ===
The Sooners have appeared in the NCAA tournament 34 times. Their combined record is 43–34. They have appeared in the Final Four of the tournament 5 times, tied with The University of Illinois for second-most appearances without winning a national championship.

Year	Seed	Round	Opponent	Result
1939		Elite Eight; Final Four	Utah State; Oregon	W 50–39; L 37–55
1943		Elite Eight; Regional 3rd Place Game	Wyoming; Washington	L 50–53; W 48–43
1947		Elite Eight; Final Four; National Championship	Oregon State; Texas; Holy Cross	W 56–54; W 55–54; L 47–58
1979	(5)	Second Round; Sweet Sixteen	(4) Texas (1) Indiana State	W 90–76; L 72–93
1983	(7)	First Round; Second Round	(10) UAB (2) Indiana	W 71–63; L 49–63
1984	(2)	Second Round	(10) Dayton	L 85–89
1985	(1)	First Round; Second Round; Sweet Sixteen; Elite Eight	(16) North Carolina A&T (9) Illinois State (5) Louisiana Tech (2) Memphis State	W 96–83; W 75–69; W 86–84^{OT} L 61–63
1986	(4)	First Round; Second Round	(13) Northeastern (12) DePaul	W 80–74; L 69–74
1987	(6)	First Round; Second Round; Sweet Sixteen	(11) Tulsa (3) Pittsburgh (2) Iowa	W 74–69; W 96–93; L 91–93^{OT}
1988	(1)	First Round; Second Round; Sweet Sixteen; Elite Eight; Final Four; National Championship	(16) UT Chattanooga (8) Auburn (5) Louisville (6) Villanova (1) Arizona (6) Kansas	W 94–66; W 107–87; W 108–98; W 78–59; W 86–79; L 79–83
1989	(1)	First Round; Second Round; Sweet Sixteen	(16) East Tennessee State (9) Louisiana Tech (5) Virginia	W 72–71; W 124–81; L 80–86
1990	(1)	First Round; Second Round	(16) Towson State (8) North Carolina	W 77–68; L 77–79
1992	(4)	First Round	(13) Southwestern Louisiana	L 83–87
1995	(4)	First Round	(13) Manhattan	L 67–77
1996	(10)	First Round	(7) Temple	L 43–61
1997	(11)	First Round	(6) Stanford	L 67–80
1998	(10)	First Round	(7) Indiana	L 87–94^{OT}
1999	(13)	First Round; Second Round; Sweet Sixteen	(4) Arizona (5) UNC Charlotte (1) Michigan State	W 61–60; W 85–72; L 46–54
2000	(3)	First Round; Second Round	(14) Winthrop (6) Purdue	W 74–50; L 62–66
2001	(4)	First Round	(13) Indiana State	L 68–70^{OT}
2002	(2)	First Round; Second Round; Sweet Sixteen; Elite Eight; Final Four	(15) UIC (7) Xavier (3) Arizona (12) Missouri (5) Indiana	W 71–63; W 78–65; W 88–67; W 81–75; L 64–73
2003	(1)	First Round; Second Round; Sweet Sixteen; Elite Eight	(16) South Carolina State (8) California (12) Butler (3) Syracuse	W 71–54; W 74–65; W 65–54; L 47–63
2005	(3)	First Round; Second Round	(14) Niagara (6) Utah	W 84–67; L 58–67
2006	(6)	First Round	(11) Milwaukee	L 74–82
2008	(6)	First Round; Second Round	(11) Saint Joseph's (3) Louisville	W 72–64; L 48–78
2009	(2)	First Round; Second Round; Sweet Sixteen; Elite Eight	(15) Morgan State (10) Michigan (3) Syracuse (1) North Carolina	W 82–54; W 73–63; W 84–71; L 60–72
2013	(10)	First Round	(7) San Diego State	L 55–70
2014	(5)	First Round	(12) North Dakota State	L 75–80^{OT}
2015	(3)	Second Round; Third Round; Sweet Sixteen	(14) Albany (11) Dayton (7) Michigan State	W 69–60; W 72–66; L 58–62
2016	(2)	First Round; Second Round; Sweet Sixteen; Elite Eight; Final Four	(15) Cal State Bakersfield (10) VCU (3) Texas A&M (1) Oregon (2) Villanova	W 82–68; W 85–81; W 77–63; W 80–68; L 51–95
2018	(10)	First Round	(7) Rhode Island	L 78–83^{OT}
2019	(9)	First Round; Second Round	(8) Ole Miss (1) Virginia	W 95–72; L 51–63
2021	(8)	First Round; Second Round	(9) Missouri (1) Gonzaga	W 72–68; L 71–87
2025	(9)	First Round	(8) UConn	L 59–67

=== NCAA tournament seeding history ===
The NCAA began seeding the NCAA Division I men's basketball tournament with the 1979 edition. The 64-team field started in 1985, which guaranteed that a championship team had to win six games.

Years →	'79	'83	'84	'85	'86	'87	'88	'89	'90	'92	'95	'96	'97	'98	'99	'00	'01	'02	'03	'05	'06	'08	'09	'13	'14	'15	'16	'18	'19	'21	'25
Seeds →	5	7	2	1	4	6	1	1	1	4	4	10	11	10	13	3	4	2	1	3	6	6	2	10	5	3	2	10	9	8	9

=== NIT results ===
The Sooners have appeared in the National Invitation Tournament (NIT) eight times. Their combined record is 11–8.

Year	Round	Opponent	Result
1970	First Round; Quarterfinals	Louisville; LSU	W 74–73; L 94–97
1971	First Round	Hawaiʻi	L 86–87
1982	First Round; Second Round; Quarterfinals; Semifinals	Oral Roberts; UC Irvine; Dayton; Bradley	W 81–73; W 80–77; W 91–82; L 68–84
1991	First Round; Second Round; Quarterfinals; Semifinals; Final	Tulsa; Cincinnati; Providence; Colorado; Stanford	W 111–86; W 89–81; W 83–74; W 88–78; L 72–78
1993	First Round; Second Round	Michigan State; Minnesota	W 88–86; L 72–86
1994	First Round	Vanderbilt	L 67–77
2004	First Round; Second Round	LSU; Michigan	W 70–61; L 52–63
2022	First Round; Second Round	Missouri State; St. Bonaventure	W 89–72; L 68–70

=== CBC results ===
The Sooners have appeared in one College Basketball Crown (CBC). Their record is 2–1.

Year	Round	Opponent	Result
2026	Quarterfinals; Semifinals; Final	Colorado; Baylor; West Virginia	W 90–86^{OT} W 82–69; L 82–89

== Honored players and coaches ==
=== Retired jerseys ===
Oklahoma has honored six jersey numbers.

Oklahoma Sooners honored jerseys
No.	Player	Position	Career	Year of Retirement
10	Mookie Blaylock	PG	1987–1989	2001
23	Wayman Tisdale	PF	1982–1985	1997
23	Blake Griffin	PF	2007–2009	2016
24	Buddy Hield	SG	2012–2016	2026
33	Alvan Adams	PF	1972–1975	1998
33	Stacey King	PF	1985–1989	2008

== See also ==
- Oklahoma Sooners women's basketball
