= 1987–88 Oklahoma Sooners men's basketball team =

American college basketball season

1987–88 Oklahoma Sooners men's basketball

NCAA Tournament, Runner-up Big 8 Conference Regular Season Champions Big 8 Conference tournament champions

National Championship Game, L 79-83 vs. Kansas
- Conference: Big Eight Conference

Ranking
- Coaches: No. 3
- AP: No. 4
- Record: 35–4 (12–2 Big Eight)
- Head coach: Billy Tubbs (8th season)
- Assistant coaches: Mike Mims; Jim Kerwin (4th season); Mike Anderson
- Home arena: Lloyd Noble Center (Capacity: 10,871)

1987–88 Big Eight Conference men's basketball standings
	Conf.				Overall
Team	W		L	PCT	W		L	PCT
No. 4 Oklahoma†	12	–	2	.857	35	–	4	.897
No. 20 Kansas State	11	–	3	.786	25	–	9	.735
Kansas	9	–	5	.643	27	–	11	.711
Missouri	7	–	7	.500	19	–	11	.633
Iowa State	6	–	8	.429	20	–	12	.625
Oklahoma State	4	–	10	.286	14	–	16	.467
Nebraska	4	–	10	.286	13	–	18	.419
Colorado	3	–	11	.214	7	–	21	.250
† 1988 Big Eight tournament winner As of March 3, 2012; Rankings from AP poll

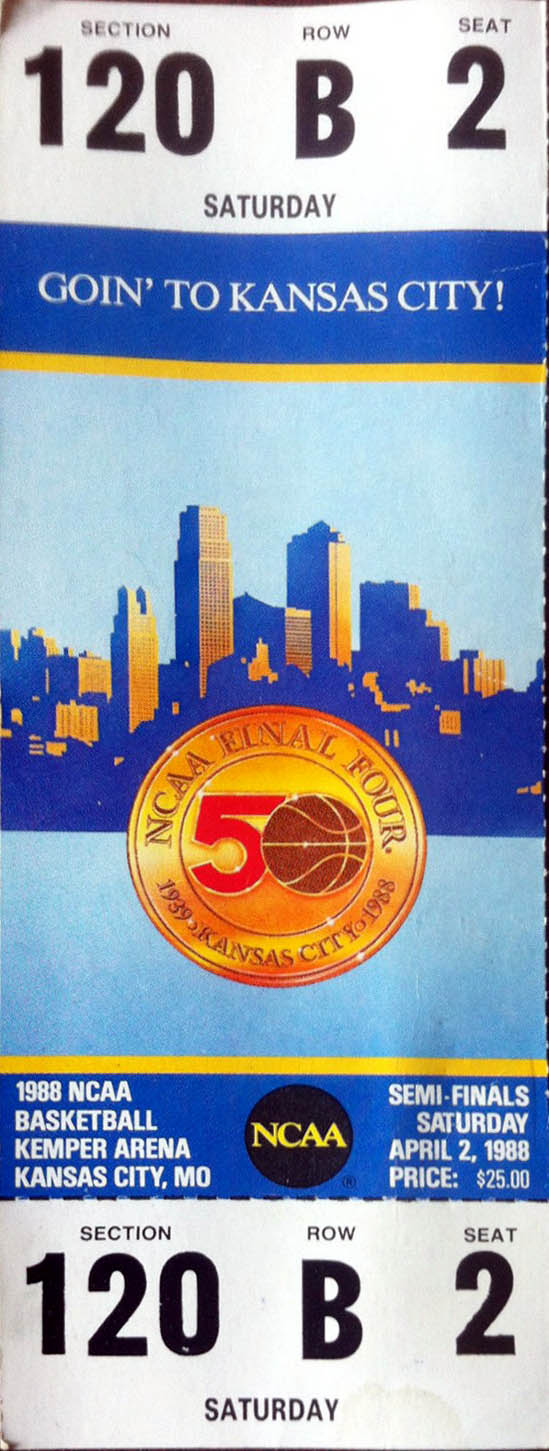
Oklahoma earned its third Final Four appearance in 1988, where they suffered a loss against Kansas in the championship game.

The 1987–88 Oklahoma Sooners men's basketball team represented the University of Oklahoma in competitive college basketball during the 1987–88 NCAA Division I men's basketball season. The Oklahoma Sooners men's basketball team played its home games in the Lloyd Noble Center and was a member of the National Collegiate Athletic Association's (NCAA) former Big Eight Conference at that time. The team posted a 35–4 overall record and a 12–2 conference record to earn the Conference title under head coach Billy Tubbs. This was the third Big Eight Conference Regular Season Championship for Tubbs and his second Big Eight Conference tournament Championship.

The team was led by three future NBA draft first round selections: Harvey Grant, Stacey King and Mookie Blaylock. Grant and King earned All-American recognition that season. The team won its first 14 games before losing back to back contests to unranked LSU and Kansas State. The team then won 12 consecutive games before falling to unranked Missouri in overtime in its penultimate regular season game. The team then ran off 9 more wins taking it to the championship game of the 1988 NCAA Division I men's basketball tournament where it lost to Kansas. The team defeated all five ranked opponents it faced during the season. (In order, #6 Pitt, #12 Iowa State twice, a rematch against #14 Kansas State, and #2 Arizona in the final four).

Mookie Blaylock established the current National Collegiate Athletic Association Division I college basketball single-season steals (150) and single-game steals (13) records. Stacey King set the current Oklahoma Sooners men's basketball single-season blocked shots (103) record. Ricky Grace set the single-season assists (280) record. The team holds numerous Sooner records including wins (35), and points per game (102.5).

== Roster ==
1987–88 Oklahoma Sooners men's basketball team
Players
Coaches

Pos.	#	Name	Height	Weight	Year	Previous school	Hometown
F	21	Mike Bell	6 ft 5 in (1.96 m)	201 lb (91 kg)	Jr	Robert E. Lee	Montgomery, AL
G	10	Mookie Blaylock	6 ft 0 in (1.83 m)	177 lb (80 kg)	Jr	Garland	Garland, TX
G	23	Chris Durley	6 ft 3 in (1.91 m)	210 lb (95 kg)	Jr	Douglass	Oklahoma City, OK
G	14	Ricky Grace	6 ft 1 in (1.85 m)	172 lb (78 kg)	Sr	Wilmer–Hutchins	Dallas, TX
F	25	Harvey Grant	6 ft 8 in (2.03 m)	200 lb (91 kg)	Sr	Independence CC	Sparta, GA
F	55	Darryl Johnson	6 ft 5 in (1.96 m)	218 lb (99 kg)	Fr	Yates	Houston, TX
F	22	Tyrone Jones	6 ft 5 in (1.96 m)	215 lb (98 kg)	Jr	Dunbar	Washington, D.C.
C	33	Stacey King	6 ft 10 in (2.08 m)	229 lb (104 kg)	Jr	Lawton	Lawton, OK
F	50	Tony Martin	6 ft 7 in (2.01 m)	230 lb (104 kg)		Manual Arts	Los Angeles, CA
G	24	Terrence Mullins	6 ft 2 in (1.88 m)	198 lb (90 kg)	Fr	Riordan	San Francisco, CA
G	20	Art Pollard	6 ft 2 in (1.88 m)	184 lb (83 kg)	Jr	Roosevelt	East Chicago, IN
F	44	Dave Sieger	6 ft 5 in (1.96 m)	207 lb (94 kg)	Sr	San Gorgonio	San Bernardino, CA
G	11	Jason Skurcenski	6 ft 2 in (1.88 m)	172 lb (78 kg)	Fr	Bartlesville	Bartlesville, OK
F	32	Andre Wiley	6 ft 5 in (1.96 m)	197 lb (89 kg)	Jr	Southwestern	Flint, MI

Head coach

- Billy Tubbs

Assistant coach(es)

- Mike Mims
- Jim Kerwin
- Mike Anderson

Legend

- (C) Team captain
- (S) Suspended
- (I) Ineligible
- (W) Walk-on
- Injured
- Current redshirt

Roster
Last update: 2016-Jan-29

== Schedule ==
Date time, TV	Rank^{#}	Opponent^{#}	Result	Record	Site (attendance) city, state
Regular Season
11/28/1987*; 3:00 pm, Sooner Sports Network	No. 19	Texas A&M	W 104–80	1–0	Lloyd Noble Center; Norman, OK
12/01/1987*; 8:00 pm, USA	No. 18	at Penn State	W 93–59	2–0	Rec Hall; University Park, PA
12/05/1987*; 3:00 pm, Sooner Sports Network	No. 18	Loyola (IL)	W 123–73	3–0	Lloyd Noble Center; Norman, OK
12/07/1987*; 8:00 pm, Sooner Sports Network	No. 18	Sam Houston State	W 111–69	4–0	Lloyd Noble Center; Norman, OK
12/10/1987*; 8:00 pm, ESPN	No. 16	at Florida State	W 89–87	5–0	Tallahassee–Leon County Civic Center; Tallahassee, FL
12/12/1987*; 3:00 pm, Sooner Sports Network	No. 16	Centenary (LA)	W 152–84	6–0	Lloyd Noble Center; Norman, OK
12/19/1987*; 3:00 pm, Sooner Sports Network	No. 14	Georgia State	W 124–81	7–0	Lloyd Noble Center; Norman, OK
12/23/1987*; 2:30 pm	No. 12	vs. Virginia; Chaminade Classic quarterfinals	W 109–61	8–0	Neal S. Blaisdell Center; Honolulu, HI
12/24/1987*; 4:00 pm	No. 12	vs. Dayton; Chaminade Classic semifinals	W 151–99	9–0	Neal S. Blaisdell Center; Honolulu, HI
12/25/1987*; 6:30 pm	No. 12	vs. Georgia; Chaminade Classic championship	W 93–90	10–0	Neal S. Blaisdell Center; Honolulu, HI
12/29/1987*; 6:00 pm, Sooner Sports Network	No. 10	vs. Oral Roberts; All–College Classic semifinals	W 144–93	11–0	Myriad Convention Center; Oklahoma City, OK
12/30/1987*; 8:00 pm, Sooner Sports Network	No. 10	vs. Illinois State; All–College Classic championship	W 107–56	12–0	Myriad Convention Center; Oklahoma City, OK
01/04/1988*; 8:00 pm, Sooner Sports Network	No. 10	Austin Peay	W 109–69	13–0	Lloyd Noble Center; Norman, OK
01/09/1988; 3:00 pm, Raycom	No. 8	Oklahoma State; Bedlam Series	W 108–80	14–0 (1–0)	Lloyd Noble Center; Norman, OK
01/11/1988*; 8:00 pm, USA	No. 8	vs. LSU	L 77–84	14–1	Lakefront Arena; New Orleans, LA
01/16/1988; 3:00 pm, Raycom	No. 3	at Kansas State	L 62–69	14–2 (1–1)	Ahearn Field House; Manhattan, KS
01/20/1988; 9:00 pm, Sooner Sports Network	No. 11	at Colorado	W 96–76	15–2 (2–1)	Coors Events Center; Boulder, CO
01/23/1988*; 1:00 pm, CBS	No. 11	No. 6 Pittsburgh	W 86–83	16–2	Lloyd Noble Center; Norman, OK
01/27/1988; 8:00 pm, Raycom	No. 10	No. 12 Iowa State	W 109–86	17–2 (3–1)	Lloyd Noble Center; Norman, OK
01/30/1988; 1:00 pm, Raycom	No. 10	at No. 12 Iowa State	W 96–91	18–2 (4–1)	Hilton Coliseum; Ames, IA
02/03/1988; 8:00 pm, Raycom	No. 7	at Kansas	W 73–65	19–2 (5–1)	Allen Fieldhouse; Lawrence, KS
02/06/1988; 1:00 pm, Raycom	No. 7	Missouri	W 120–101	20–2 (6–1)	Lloyd Noble Center; Norman, OK
02/09/1988; 8:00 pm, Sooner Sports Network	No. 4	at Nebraska	W 92–77	21–2 (7–1)	Bob Devaney Sports Center; Lincoln, NE
02/13/1988; 1:00 pm, Raycom	No. 4	No. 14 Kansas State	W 112–95	22–2 (8–1)	Lloyd Noble Center; Norman, OK
02/17/1988; 8:00 pm, Raycom	No. 4	at Oklahoma State; Bedlam Series	W 79–75	23–2 (9–1)	Gallagher-Iba Arena; Stillwater, OK
02/20/1988*; 3:00 pm, Sooner Sports Network	No. 4	New Mexico	W 120–100	24–2	Lloyd Noble Center; Norman, OK
02/24/1988; 6:00 pm, ESPN	No. 4	Kansas	W 95–87	25–2 (10–1)	Lloyd Noble Center; Norman, OK
02/27/1988; 1:00 pm, Raycom	No. 4	Colorado	W 134–84	26–2 (11–1)	Lloyd Noble Center; Norman, OK
03/03/1988; 6:00 pm, ESPN	No. 4	at Missouri	L 90–93 ^{OT}	26–3 (11–2)	Hearnes Center; Columbia, MO
03/05/1988; 3:00 pm, Raycom	No. 4	Nebraska	W 113–93	27–3 (12–2)	Lloyd Noble Center; Norman, OK
Phillips 66 Big 8 Tournament
03/11/1988; 2:30 pm, Raycom	(1) No. 4	vs. (8) Colorado; Quarterfinals	W 99–66	28–3	Kemper Arena; Kansas City, MO
03/12/1988; 1:00 pm, Raycom	(1) No. 4	vs. (4) Missouri; Semifinals	W 102–99	29–3	Kemper Arena; Kansas City, MO
03/13/1988; 3:00 pm, ABC	(1) No. 4	vs. (2) Kansas State; Finals	W 88–83	30–3	Kemper Arena; Kansas City, MO
NCAA Tournament
03/17/1988; 1:37 pm, ESPN/NCAA Productions	(SE 1) No. 4	vs. (SE 16) Chattanooga; Round of 64	W 94–66	31–3	The Omni; Atlanta, GA
03/19/1988; 4:00 pm, CBS	(SE 1) No. 4	vs. (SE 8) Auburn; Round of 32	W 107–87	32–3	The Omni; Atlanta, GA
03/24/1988; 9:39 pm, CBS	(SE 1) No. 4	vs. (SE 5) Louisville; Sweet Sixteen	W 108–98	33–3	BJCC Arena; Birmingham, AL
03/26/1988; 3:05 pm, CBS	(SE 1) No. 4	vs. (SE 6) Villanova; Elite Eight	W 78–59	34–3	BJCC Arena; Birmingham, AL
04/02/1988; 7:12 pm, CBS	(SE 1) No. 4	vs. (W 1) No. 2 Arizona; Final Four	W 86–78	35–3	Kemper Arena; Kansas City, MO
04/04/1988; 8:12 pm, CBS	(SE 1) No. 4	vs. (MW 6) Kansas; National Championship	L 79–83	35–4	Kemper Arena; Kansas City, MO
*Non-conference game. ^{#}Rankings from AP Poll. (#) Tournament seedings in parentheses. All times are in Central Time. (#) during NCAA Tournament is seed within region SE=Southeast.

== Rankings ==
Ranking movement Legend: ██ Increase in ranking. ██ Decrease in ranking. (RV) Received votes but unranked. (NR) Not ranked.
Poll	Pre	Wk 2	Wk 3	Wk 4	Wk 5	Wk 6	Wk 7	Wk 8	Wk 9	Wk 10	Wk 11	Wk 12	Wk 13	Wk 14	Wk 15	Wk 16	Final
AP	19	18	16	14	12	10	8	3	11	10	7	4	4	4	4	4	4
Coaches	n/a	17	16	14	13	10	8	3	11	10	8	4	4	4	3	4	4

== NCAA basketball tournament ==
The following is a summary of the team's performance in the NCAA Division I men's basketball tournament:

- Southeast
  - Oklahoma (1) 94, Chattanooga (16) 66
  - Oklahoma 107, Auburn (8) 87
  - Oklahoma 108, Louisville (5) 98 (Sweet 16)
  - Oklahoma 78, Villanova (6) 59 (Regional Final)
- Final Four
  - Oklahoma 86, Arizona 78
  - Kansas 83, Oklahoma 79

== Honors ==
- All-American: Harvey Grant and Stacey King (1st of 2 times)
- Big Eight tournament MVP: King
- NCAA Tournament Southeast Regional MVP: King

== Team players drafted into the NBA ==
The following players were drafted in the 1988 NBA draft:

Round	Pick	Player	Position	NBA club
1	12	Harvey Grant	Guard	Washington Bullets
3	67	Ricky Grace	Guard	Utah Jazz

The following players were varsity letter-winners from this team who were drafted in the NBA draft in later years:

- 1989 NBA draft: Stacey King (1st, 6th, Chicago Bulls), Mookie Blaylock (1st, 12th, New Jersey Nets)
