= 1988 NCAA Division I men's basketball championship game =

American college basketball final

1988 NCAA Tournament Championship Game
National championship game
Kansas Jayhawks	Oklahoma Sooners
Big Eight	Big Eight
(26–11)	(35–3)
83	79
Head coach: Larry Brown	Head coach: Billy Tubbs
- AP: NR
- Coaches: NR
- AP: 4
- Coaches: 4
	1st half	2nd half	Total
Kansas Jayhawks	50	33	83
Oklahoma Sooners	50	29	79
- Date: April 4, 1988
- Venue: Kemper Arena, Kansas City, Missouri
- MVP: Danny Manning, Kansas
- Favorite: Oklahoma by 8
- Referees: John Clougherty, Tim Higgins & Ed Hightower
- Attendance: 16,392

United States TV coverage
- Network: CBS
- Announcers: Brent Musburger (play-by-play); Billy Packer (color)

The 1988 NCAA Division I men's basketball championship game was the final round of the 1988 NCAA Division I men's basketball tournament and determined the national champion for the 1987–88 NCAA Division I men's basketball season The game was played on April 4, 1988, at Kemper Arena in Kansas City, Missouri, and featured the Southeast Regional Champion, #1-seeded Oklahoma versus the Midwest Regional Champion, #6-seeded Kansas, both from the Big Eight Conference.

The game remains, as of 2026, the last time two teams from the same conference played for the National Championship. Kansas's upset of Oklahoma was the third-biggest point-spread upset in the national title game in NCAA Tournament history. After the win, the 1988 Kansas team was remembered as "Danny and the Miracles" due to Danny Manning's excellence throughout the tournament, including a double-double in the national championship game with 31 points and 18 rebounds.

As of 2026, the 1988 Jayhawks are the most recent team to win the national championship as an unranked team.

== Participating teams ==
=== Kansas Jayhawks ===
Danny Manning, a senior forward, was named the Big Eight Conference Men's Basketball Player of the Year for the third consecutive season.

- Midwest
  - (6) Kansas 85, (11) Xavier 72
  - (6) Kansas 61, (14) Murray State 58
  - (6) Kansas 77, (7) Vanderbilt 64
  - (6) Kansas 71, (4) Kansas State 58
- Final Four
  - (MW6) Kansas 66, (E2) Duke 59

=== Oklahoma Sooners ===
- Southeast
  - (1) Oklahoma 94, (16) Chattanooga 66
  - (1) Oklahoma 107, (8) Auburn 87
  - (1) Oklahoma 108, (5) Louisville 98
  - (1) Oklahoma 78, (6) Villanova 59
- Final Four
  - (SE1) Oklahoma 86, (W1) Arizona 78

== Starting lineups ==
Kansas	Position	Oklahoma
Kevin Pritchard	G	Ricky Grace
Jeff Gueldner	G	Mookie Blaylock
Chris Piper	F	Harvey Grant
Milt Newton	F	Dave Sieger
†Danny Manning	C	Stacey King
† 1988 Consensus First Team All-American

== Game summary ==
External videos
- Full game broadcast by CBS on YouTube

April 4, 1988

#MW6 Kansas Jayhawks 83, #SE1 Oklahoma Sooners 79
Scoring by half: 50-50, 33-29
Pts: Danny Manning 31; Rebs: Danny Manning 18; Asts: Kevin Pritchard, Clint Normore 4	Pts: Dave Sieger 22; Rebs: Stacey King, Ricky Grace 7 Asts: Dave Sieger, Ricky Grace 7

Kemper Arena, Kansas City, Missouri
Referees: John Clougherty, Tim Higgins & Ed Hightower
