= Otis Livingston =

American sports journalist

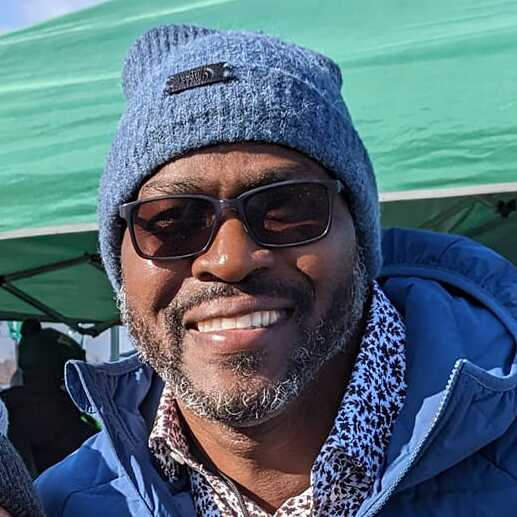
- Livingston in 2022
- Born: 1967 or 1968 (age 58–59)
- Education: San Pedro High School; University of Idaho (BS); University of Kansas; El Camino College
- Height: 6 ft 0 in (183 cm)
- Children: Otis Livingston II
- Awards: First Team All-Big Sky (1990)
- Presenting career
- Stations: WCBS-TV; CBS Sports

Otis Antoine Livingston is a weekday sports anchor at WCBS-TV in New York City and is a sideline reporter on CBS Sports. He has won numerous Emmy Awards.

== Biography ==
Livingston joined WCBS in 2010.

In New York, he also worked with WNBC-TV. He reported on the NBA Finals, the Stanley Cup Final, the World Series, the U.S. Open Tennis Championships, the U.S. Open Golf Championship, the Triple Crown, and the New York City Marathon. He also served as anchor and reporter for the Olympics on NBC. He was the sideline reporter for the New York Giants preseason and serves the same capacity for the New York Jets. He works with play-by-play announcer Ian Eagle and color commentator Greg Buttle.

Livingston was also previously a weekend sports anchor and weekday sports reporter for WWOR-TV and WTVO-TV.

While at NBC, Livingston reported for NBC Sports from the 2004 Summer Olympics and the 2006 Winter Olympics. For CBS Sports, Livingston has served as a sideline reporter for SEC on CBS football games and the NCAA tournament.

== Personal life ==
Otis Livingston graduated from the University of Idaho with a Bachelor of Science degree in Telecommunications. He is a member of the Fellowship of Christian Athletes. He is also a member of the New Jersey Music Workshop for the Arts. He lives in New Jersey with his wife and five children.

Livingston spent one season playing point guard for the 1987–88 Kansas Jayhawks men's basketball team. He was suspended and then quit or was kicked off the team by coach Larry Brown before the Jayhawks won the NCAA championship. He later covered Brown and his Philadelphia 76ers as a reporter for WPHL-TV.

His son, Otis Livingston II, played college basketball for the George Mason Patriots before playing basketball professionally.
