= 1987–88 Iowa State Cyclones men's basketball team =

American college basketball season

1987–88 Iowa State Cyclones men's basketball

NCAA tournament
- Conference: Big Eight Conference
- Record: 20–12 (6–8 Big Eight)
- Head coach: Johnny Orr (8th season)
- Assistant coach: Steve Krafcisin
- Home arena: Hilton Coliseum

1987–88 Big Eight Conference men's basketball standings
	Conf.				Overall
Team	W		L	PCT	W		L	PCT
No. 4 Oklahoma†	12	–	2	.857	35	–	4	.897
No. 20 Kansas State	11	–	3	.786	25	–	9	.735
Kansas	9	–	5	.643	27	–	11	.711
Missouri	7	–	7	.500	19	–	11	.633
Iowa State	6	–	8	.429	20	–	12	.625
Oklahoma State	4	–	10	.286	14	–	16	.467
Nebraska	4	–	10	.286	13	–	18	.419
Colorado	3	–	11	.214	7	–	21	.250
† 1988 Big Eight tournament winner As of March 3, 2012; Rankings from AP poll

The 1987–88 Iowa State Cyclones men's basketball team represented Iowa State University during the 1987–88 NCAA Division I men's basketball season. The Cyclones were coached by Johnny Orr, who was in his 8th season. They played their home games at Hilton Coliseum in Ames, Iowa.

They finished the season 20–12, 6–8 in Big Eight play to finish in 5th place. They earned an at-large bid to the NCAA tournament as the #12 seed in the East region. The Cyclones lost to Georgia Tech in the opening round of the tournament.

== Roster ==
1987–88 Iowa State Cyclones men's basketball team
Players
Coaches

Pos.	#	Name	Height	Weight	Year	Hometown
F	3	Gary Thompkins (C)	6 ft 3 in (1.91 m)	—	Sr
G	4	Terry Woods	5 ft 9 in (1.75 m)	—	So
F	5	Lafester Rhodes	6 ft 8 in (2.03 m)	—	Sr
	13	Dick Breitbach	—	—
F	21	Norman Brown	—	—
G	22	Mike Born	6 ft 2 in (1.88 m)	—
	23	Matt Margenthaler	6 ft 3 in (1.91 m)	—
	24	Bernard Dutchik	—	—
F	25	Elmer Robinson	6 ft 5 in (1.96 m)	—	Jr
G	30	Marc Urquhart	6 ft 4 in (1.93 m)	—	Jr
F	32	Adrian Moore	6 ft 4 in (1.93 m)	—	So
F	41	Mark Baugh	6 ft 5 in (1.96 m)	—	So	Dolton, Illinois
	42	Robert Johnson	6 ft 6 in (1.98 m)	—
F	43	Paul Doerrfeld	6 ft 7 in (2.01 m)	—	So
G	44	Jeff Grayer (C)	6 ft 5 in (1.96 m)	—	Sr	Flint, Michigan
C	51	Bryan Heger	6 ft 9 in (2.06 m)	—	So
F	52	Victor Alexander	6 ft 9 in (2.06 m)	255 lb (116 kg)	Fr	Detroit

Head coach

- Johnny Orr (Beloit)

Assistant coach(es)

- Steve Krafcisin

Legend

- (C) Team captain
- (S) Suspended
- (I) Ineligible
- (W) Walk-on
- Injured
- Current redshirt

== Schedule and results ==
Date time, TV	Rank^{#}	Opponent^{#}	Result	Record	Site city, state
Regular season
Nov 20, 1987*; 7:00 pm, Cyclone Television Network		Texas; Big Apple NIT	W 100–83	1–0	Hilton Coliseum (14,122); Ames, Iowa
Nov 24, 1987*; 6:30 pm, Score		at No. 2 Purdue; Big Apple NIT	W 104–96	2–0	Mackey Arena; West Lafayette, Indiana
Nov 27, 1987*; 8:00 pm, USA		vs. No. 14 Florida; Big Apple NIT	L 89–96	2–1	Madison Square Garden (7,311); New York City
Nov 28, 1987*; 6:00 pm		vs. New Mexico; Big Apple NIT	W 107–96	3–1	Madison Square Garden; New York
Dec 2, 1987*; 7:35 pm, Iowa Public Television		at Northern Iowa; Iowa Big Four	W 80–75	4–1	UNI-Dome; Cedar Falls, Iowa
Dec 5, 1987*; 7:38 pm, Heritage Cablevision		at Drake; Iowa Big Four	W 83–77	5–1	UNI-Dome; Des Moines, Iowa
Dec 8, 1987*; 7:00 pm, Cyclone Television Network		Arizona State	W 99–85	6–1	Hilton Coliseum; Ames, Iowa
Dec 12, 1987*; 1:05 pm, Cyclone Television Network		Creighton	W 115–73	7–1	Hilton Coliseum; Ames, Iowa
Dec 19, 1987*; 7:05 pm, Cyclone Television Network	No. 20	No. 7 Iowa; CyHawk Rivalry	W 102–100 ^{OT}	8–1	Hilton Coliseum; Ames, Iowa
Dec 21, 1987*; 7:05 pm	No. 20	Eastern Illinois	W 76–66 ^{OT}	9–1	Hilton Coliseum; Ames, Iowa
Dec 28, 1987*; 5:30 pm	No. 16	vs. Butler; Blade City Classic Semifinals	L 76–78	9–2	Centennial Hall (4,500); Toledo, Ohio
Dec 29, 1987*; 5:00 pm	No. 16	vs. Navy; Blade City Classic Consolation	W 83–61	10–2	Centennial Hall; Toledo, Ohio
Jan 2, 1988*; 1:00 pm, Cyclone Television Network	No. 16	South Dakota	W 95–67	11–2	Hilton Coliseum; Ames, Iowa
Jan 7, 1988*; 7:00 pm	No. 17	Grambling State	W 99–81	12–2	Hilton Coliseum; Ames, Iowa
Jan 9, 1988*; 7:10 pm, Cyclone Television Network	No. 17	at Dayton	W 84–80	13–2	Dayton Arena; Dayton, Ohio
Jan 13, 1988; 7:08 pm, ESPN/Cyclone Television Network	No. 14	No. 16 Kansas	W 88–78	14–2 (1–0)	Hilton Coliseum; Ames, Iowa
Jan 16, 1988*; 1:08 pm	No. 14	U.S. International	W 123–92	15–2	Hilton Coliseum; Ames, Iowa
Jan 20, 1988; 7:08 pm, Cyclone Television Network	No. 10	Nebraska	W 114–76	16–2 (2–0)	Hilton Coliseum; Ames, Iowa
Jan 23, 1988; 1:10 pm, Big Eight	No. 10	at Missouri	L 93–119	16–3 (2–1)	Hearnes Center; Columbia, Missouri
Jan 27, 1988; 7:35 pm, Raycom/Closed Circuit (Iowa)	No. 12	at No. 10 Oklahoma	L 86–109	16–4 (2–2)	Lloyd Noble Center; Norman, Oklahoma
Jan 30, 1988; 1:00 pm, Big Eight	No. 12	No. 10 Oklahoma	L 91–96	16–5 (2–3)	Hilton Coliseum; Ames, Iowa
Feb 3, 1988; 7:05 pm, Cyclone Television Network	No. 16	at Kansas State	L 68–79 ^{OT}	16–6 (2–4)	Ahearn Field House; Manhattan, Kansas
Feb 6, 1988; 3:10 pm, Big Eight	No. 16	Oklahoma State	L 78–80 ^{OT}	16–7 (2–5)	Hilton Coliseum; Ames, Iowa
Feb 10, 1988; 9:05 pm		at Colorado	L 75–87	16–8 (2–6)	Coors Events Center; Boulder, Colorado
Feb 13, 1988; 3:10 pm, Big Eight		at Kansas	L 72–82	16–9 (2–7)	Allen Fieldhouse; Lawrence, Kansas
Feb 17, 1988; 9:10 pm, ESPN		No. 15 Missouri	W 102–89	17–9 (3–7)	Hilton Coliseum; Ames, Iowa
Feb 24, 1988; 7:08 pm		Kansas State	L 66–83	17–10 (3–8)	Hilton Coliseum; Ames, Iowa
Feb 27, 1988; 3:08 pm, Big Eight (KCCI)		at Nebraska	W 85–84	18–10 (4–8)	Devaney Sports Center; Lincoln, Nebraska
Mar 2, 1988; 7:10 pm, Cyclone Television Network		at Oklahoma State	W 97–88	19–10 (5–8)	Gallagher-Iba Arena; Stillwater, Oklahoma
Mar 5, 1988; 1:10 pm		at Colorado	W 98–62	20–10 (6–8)	Hilton Coliseum; Ames, Iowa
Big Eight tournament
Mar 11, 1988; 12:10 pm, Raycom	(5)	vs. (4) Missouri; Big Eight tournament Quarterfinal	L 80–90	20–11	Kemper Arena; Kansas City, Missouri
NCAA Tournament
Mar 18, 1988*; 11:07 am, WOI/KGAN/KCAU/KIMT/KLJB; ESPN/NCAA Productions	(12 E)	vs. (5 E) Georgia Tech; NCAA tournament East Region First round	L 78–90	20–12	Hartford Civic Center; Hartford, Connecticut
*Non-conference game. ^{#}Rankings from AP poll. (#) Tournament seedings in parentheses. SE=Southeast. All times are in Central Time.
