= 1987–88 Missouri Tigers men's basketball team =

American college basketball season

1987–88 Missouri Tigers men's basketball

NCAA tournament, first round
- Conference: Big Eight Conference
- Record: 19–11 (7–7 Big 8)
- Head coach: Norm Stewart (21st season)
- Assistant coaches: Bob Sundvold (7th season); Rich Daly (5th season); Anthony Smith (3rd season)
- Home arena: Hearnes Center

1987–88 Big Eight Conference men's basketball standings
	Conf.				Overall
Team	W		L	PCT	W		L	PCT
No. 4 Oklahoma†	12	–	2	.857	35	–	4	.897
No. 20 Kansas State	11	–	3	.786	25	–	9	.735
Kansas	9	–	5	.643	27	–	11	.711
Missouri	7	–	7	.500	19	–	11	.633
Iowa State	6	–	8	.429	20	–	12	.625
Oklahoma State	4	–	10	.286	14	–	16	.467
Nebraska	4	–	10	.286	13	–	18	.419
Colorado	3	–	11	.214	7	–	21	.250
† 1988 Big Eight tournament winner As of March 3, 2012; Rankings from AP poll

The 1987–88 Missouri Tigers men's basketball team represented the University of Missouri as a member of the Big Eight Conference during the 1987–88 NCAA men's basketball season. Led by head coach Norm Stewart, the Tigers finished fourth in the Big Eight Conference, lost in the semifinal round of the Big Eight tournament, and received a bid to the NCAA tournament as the No. 6 seed in the East region. The Tigers were upset by Rhode Island, 87–80, in the opening round and finished with an overall record of 19–11 (7–7 Big Eight).

== Roster ==
1987–88 Missouri Tigers men's basketball team
Players
Coaches

Pos.	#	Name	Height	Weight	Year	Hometown
F	3	Derrick Chievous	6 ft 7 in (2.01 m)	190 lb (86 kg)	Sr	New York, New York
G	4	Lee Coward	6 ft 1 in (1.85 m)	—	So	Detroit, MI
G	21	Byron Irvin	6 ft 5 in (1.96 m)	190 lb (86 kg)	Jr	Chicago, Illinois
F	33	Greg Church	6 ft 8 in (2.03 m)	221 lb (100 kg)	Jr
F	34	Doug Smith	6 ft 10 in (2.08 m)	215 lb (98 kg)	Fr	Detroit, Michigan
F	42	Mike Sandbothe	6 ft 8 in (2.03 m)	—	Jr
C	52	Gary Leonard	7 ft 1 in (2.16 m)	264 lb (120 kg)	Jr	Belleville, Illinois

Head coach

- Norm Stewart (Missouri)

Assistant coach(es)

- Bob Sundvold
- Rich Daly
- Anthony Smith

Legend

- (C) Team captain
- (S) Suspended
- (I) Ineligible
- (W) Walk-on
- Injured
- Current redshirt

Roster

== Schedule and results ==
Date time, TV	Rank^{#}	Opponent^{#}	Result	Record	Site (attendance) city, state
Regular Season
Dec 4, 1987*	No. 8	North Texas; Wadsworth Show-Me Classic	W 64–56	1–0	Hearnes Center; Columbia, Missouri
Dec 5, 1987*	No. 8	Eastern Michigan; Wadsworth Show-Me Classic	W 77–75 ^{2OT}	2–0	Hearnes Center; Columbia, Missouri
Dec 8, 1987*	No. 9	at Drake	W 76–74	3–0	Veterans Memorial Auditorium; Des Moines, Iowa
Dec 12, 1987*	No. 9	at No. 20 Memphis State	L 68–76	3–1	Mid-South Coliseum; Memphis, Tennessee
Dec 15, 1987*	No. 16	Virginia Tech	W 105–96	4–1	Hearnes Center; Columbia, Missouri
Dec 22, 1987*	No. 17	vs. Illinois; Braggin' Rights	L 63–75	4–2	St. Louis Arena (18,224); St. Louis, Missouri
Dec 28, 1987*		San Jose State	W 85–61	5–2	Hearnes Center; Columbia, Missouri
Dec 30, 1987*		Alabama State	W 129–64	6–2	Hearnes Center; Columbia, Missouri
Jan 2, 1988*		Tulsa	W 92–48	7–2	Hearnes Center; Columbia, Missouri
Jan 4, 1988*		at Southern Illinois	W 86–66	8–2	SIU Arena; Carbondale, Illinois
Jan 6, 1988*		Maryland	W 93–85	9–2	Hearnes Center; Columbia, Missouri
Jan 9, 1988		at No. 18 Kansas; Border War	L 74–78	9–3 (0–1)	Allen Fieldhouse; Lawrence, Kansas
Jan 16, 1988		at Nebraska	L 68–70	9–4 (0–2)	Bob Devaney Sports Center; Lincoln, Nebraska
Jan 23, 1988; 1:10 pm, Big Eight		No. 10 Iowa State	W 119–93	11–4 (1–2)	Hearnes Center; Columbia, Missouri
Jan 30, 1988		at Oklahoma State	W 86–72	12–4 (2–2)	Gallagher-Iba Arena; Stillwater, Oklahoma
Feb 3, 1988		Colorado	W 99–69	13–4 (3–2)	Hearnes Center; Columbia, Missouri
Feb 6, 1988; 1:00 pm, Raycom		at No. 7 Oklahoma	L 101–120	13–5 (3–3)	Lloyd Noble Center; Norman, Oklahoma
Feb 9, 1988		No. 14 Kansas State	W 79–75	14–5 (4–3)	Hearnes Center; Columbia, Missouri
Feb 11, 1988		Nebraska	W 92–67	15–5 (5–3)	Hearnes Center; Columbia, Missouri
Feb 13, 1988*		at No. 7 UNLV	W 81–79	16–5	Thomas & Mack Center; Paradise, Nevada
Feb 17, 1988; 9:10 pm, ESPN	No. 15	at Iowa State	L 89–102	16–6 (5–4)	Hilton Coliseum; Ames, Iowa
Feb 21, 1988	No. 15	Oklahoma State	W 92–70	17–6 (6–4)	Hearnes Center; Columbia, Missouri
Feb 24, 1988	No. 15	at Colorado	L 78–81	17–7 (6–5)	Coors Events Center; Boulder, Colorado
Feb 27, 1988	No. 15	Kansas; Border War	L 77–82	17–8 (6–6)	Hearnes Center; Columbia, Missouri
Mar 3, 1988; 6:00 pm, ESPN		No. 4 Oklahoma	W 93–90 ^{OT}	18–8 (7–6)	Hearnes Center; Columbia, Missouri
Mar 5, 1988		at Kansas State	L 82–92	18–9 (7–7)	Ahearn Field House; Manhattan, Kansas
Big Eight Conference tournament
Mar 11, 1988*; 12:10 pm, Raycom	(4)	vs. (5) Iowa State; Big Eight tournament quarterfinals	W 90–80	19–9	Kemper Arena; Kansas City, Missouri
Mar 12, 1988*; 1:00 pm, Raycom	(4)	vs. (1) No. 4 Oklahoma; Big Eight tournament semifinals	L 99–102	19–10	Kemper Arena; Kansas City, Missouri
NCAA Tournament
Mar 17, 1988*	(6 E)	vs. (11 E) Rhode Island; East Regional – First Round	L 80–87	19–11	Dean Smith Center; Chapel Hill, North Carolina
*Non-conference game. ^{#}Rankings from AP poll. (#) Tournament seedings in parentheses. E=East. All times are in Central.

== 1988 NBA draft ==
Round	Pick	Player	NBA club
1	16	Derrick Chievous	Houston Rockets
