= Milt Newton =

American basketball player and executive (born 1965)

Milwaukee Bucks
- Title: Assistant general manager
- League: NBA

Personal information
- Born: August 25, 1965 (age 61) Saint Thomas, U.S. Virgin Islands
- Listed height: 6 ft 5 in (1.96 m)
- Listed weight: 180 lb (82 kg)

Career information
- High school: Coolidge (Washington, D.C.)
- College: Kansas (1984–1989)
- NBA draft: 1989: undrafted
- Position: Small forward

Career history
- 1989–1990: Grand Rapids Hoops
- 1990: Rockford Lightning

Career highlights
- NBL champion (1992); CBA All-Rookie Second Team (1990); NCAA champion (1988); Second-team All-Big Eight (1989)
- Stats at Basketball Reference

Milton M. Newton (born August 25, 1965) is an American professional basketball executive and former player. He is the assistant general manager of the Milwaukee Bucks of the National Basketball Association (NBA).

Newton, a 6'5" small forward, was recruited by coach Larry Brown to the University of Kansas, where he played from 1985 to 1989. During this time, he was a starting forward on Kansas' 1988 national championship team and joined teammate and Final Four Most Outstanding Player Danny Manning on the all tournament team. In the tournament final against Oklahoma, Newton scored 15 points on nearly perfect shooting, making all six of his field goal attempts (including both 3-point attempts), his only miss coming at the free-throw line. He also contributed numerous plays that, while they did not show up in the box score, contributed mightily to the Jayhawks' victory. As a senior in 1988–89, Newton was the Jayhawks' captain on Roy Williams' first team. He averaged 17.7 points and 5.1 rebounds per game and was named second team All-Big Eight Conference. Born in the United States Virgin Islands, Newton was also co-captain of the U.S. Virgin Islands entry in the 1987 Pan American Games.

After college, Newton played basketball professionally in Belgium and Australia (for the NBL's South East Melbourne Magic), and for the Rockford Lightning and Grand Rapids Hoops in the Continental Basketball Association.

Following his playing days, Newton turned to the business side of basketball. After a few years working as a scout for the Philadelphia 76ers and as the assistant director of USA Basketball, Newton joined the NBA front office and was instrumental in launching the NBA Development League. He joined the Washington Wizards as their Vice President of player personnel in 2003. In September 2013, he was hired by the Minnesota Timberwolves as their general manager. Newton was let go by the team in May 2016.
