= Jim Kerwin =

American basketball player and coach

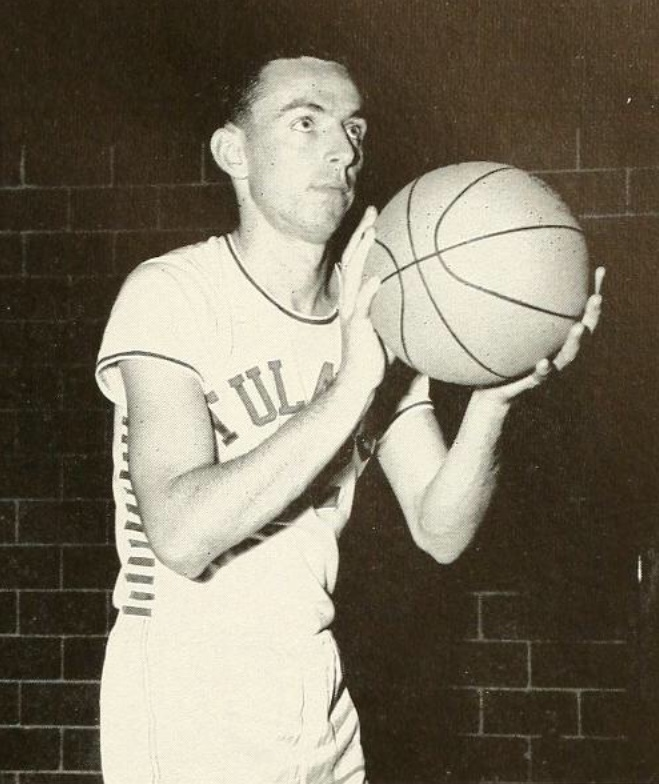
- Kerwin from the 1963 Jambalaya

Personal information
- Born: March 23, 1941 Long Branch, New Jersey, U.S.
- Died: August 13, 2021 (aged 80) Springdale, Arkansas, U.S.
- Listed height: 6 ft 3 in (1.91 m)
- Listed weight: 190 lb (86 kg)

Career information
- High school: Croydon Hall (Middletown, New Jersey)
- College: Tulane (1960–1963)
- NBA draft: 1963: 6th round, 45th overall pick
- Drafted by: New York Knicks
- Position: Shooting guard

Career history

Playing
- 1963–1967: Phillips 66ers

Coaching
- 1978–1980: Northern Oklahoma
- 1980–1984: Seminole State
- 1984–1990: Oklahoma (assistant)
- 1990–1992: Kansas State (assistant)
- 1992–2003: Western Illinois

Career highlights
- First-team All-SEC (1962)
- Stats at Basketball Reference

Jim Kerwin (March 23, 1941 – August 13, 2021) was an American basketball player and college coach.

Kerwin, a 6'3" shooting guard from Long Branch, New Jersey who attended Croydon Hall High School in Middletown, New Jersey, came to Tulane and was a three-year starter for the Green Wave and one of the Southeastern Conference's top scorers. Kerwin left Tulane as the school's all-time leading scorer (since eclipsed) with 1,462 points. After the season, he was drafted by the New York Knicks in the 1963 NBA draft (sixth round, 45th pick), but never played in the National Basketball Association (NBA).

Following an Amateur Athletic Union (AAU) career with the Phillips 66ers, Kerwin moved to coaching at the junior college level, coaching Northern Oklahoma College and Seminole State College, where he coached future NBA player Anthony Bowie. Kerwin then moved to Oklahoma as an assistant to Billy Tubbs for six seasons, coaching Sooner players such as Mookie Blaylock, Stacey King, Harvey Grant, Brent Price, and Ricky Grace, then moved to Dana Altman's staff at Kansas State for two seasons. He was then named head coach for the Western Illinois University, where he coached for eleven seasons, compiling a record of 135–174. He resigned in 2003, citing health concerns.

Kerwin's brother Tom played basketball at Centenary College of Louisiana and for the Pittsburgh Pipers of the American Basketball Association (ABA).

Kerwin died in Springdale, Arkansas at the age of 81.

== Head coaching record ==
Record table
Season	Team	Overall	Conference	Standing	Postseason
Western Illinois Leathernecks (Mid-Continent Conference) (1992–2003)
1992–93	Western Illinois	7–20	4–12	8th	
1993–94	Western Illinois	7–20	5–13	9th	
1994–95	Western Illinois	20–8	14–4	2nd	
1995–96	Western Illinois	17–12	12–6	2nd	
1996–97	Western Illinois	19–10	11–5	T–2nd	
1997–98	Western Illinois	16–11	11–5	T–3rd	
1998–99	Western Illinois	16–12	9–5	T–3rd	
1999–2000	Western Illinois	8–22	3–13	9th	
2000–01	Western Illinois	5–23	5–11	T–7th	
2001–02	Western Illinois	12–16	3–11	7th	
2002–03	Western Illinois	7–21	3–11	7th	
Western Illinois:		134–175 (.434)	80–96 (.455)		
Total:		134–175 (.434)			
National champion Postseason invitational champion Conference regular season champion Conference regular season and conference tournament champion Division regular season champion Division regular season and conference tournament champion Conference tournament champion
