= Tom Kerwin =

American basketball player

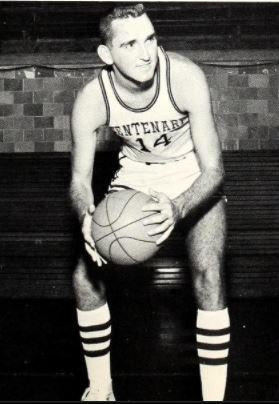
- Kerwin as a senior at Centenary

Personal information
- Born: July 7, 1944 (age 82) Newark, New Jersey, U.S.
- Listed height: 6 ft 7 in (2.01 m)
- Listed weight: 210 lb (95 kg)

Career information
- High school: Long Branch (Long Branch, New Jersey)
- College: Centenary (1963–1966)
- NBA draft: 1966: 5th round, 43rd overall pick
- Drafted by: San Francisco Warriors
- Position: Forward
- Number: 40

Career history
- 1967–1968: Pittsburgh Pipers

Career highlights
- ABA champion (1968)
- Stats at Basketball Reference

Thomas Vincent Kerwin (born July 7, 1944) is a retired American professional basketball player. Kerwin played college basketball at Centenary College of Louisiana. A 6'7" forward, Kerwin was taken in the 1966 NBA draft by the San Francisco Warriors with the 3rd pick in the 5th round (43rd overall). He played with the Pittsburgh Pipers for one season, his first game was on October 24, 1967. He played in 13 games, for 68 minutes in total, scoring 14 points on a .318 field goal percentage, while also recovering 20 rebounds. He did, however, stay on the team long enough to win an ABA championship with the team before retiring.

Kerwin's brother Jim played basketball at Tulane University and for the Phillips 66ers, and was later a coach.

== Career statistics ==
Legend
GP	Games played	GS	Games started	MPG	Minutes per game
FG%	Field goal percentage	3P%	3-point field goal percentage	FT%	Free throw percentage
RPG	Rebounds per game	APG	Assists per game	SPG	Steals per game
BPG	Blocks per game	PPG	Points per game	**Bold**	Career high

=== ABA ===
==== Regular season ====
Year	Team	GP	MPG	FG%	3P%	FT%	RPG	APG	PPG
1967–68	Pittsburgh	13	5.2	.318	–	.000	1.5	.1	1.1
