= Stacey King =

American basketball player and announcer (1967–2026)

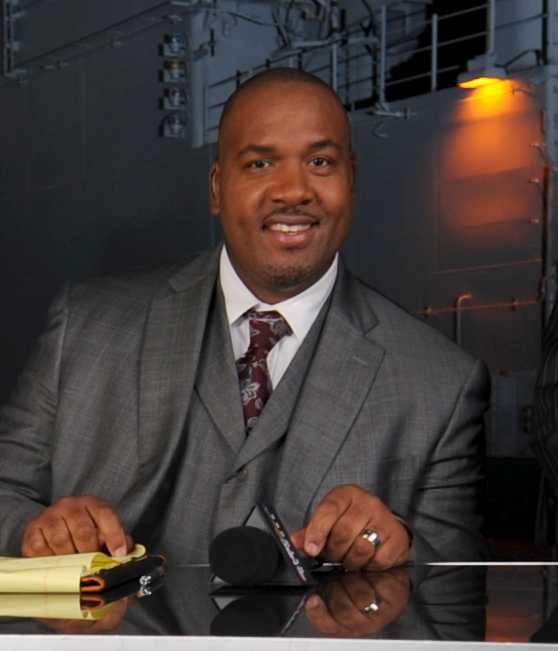
- King in 2012

Personal information
- Born: January 29, 1967 Lawton, Oklahoma, U.S.
- Died: June 7, 2026 (aged 59) River Forest, Illinois, U.S.
- Listed height: 6 ft 11 in (2.11 m)
- Listed weight: 250 lb (113 kg)

Career information
- High school: Lawton (Lawton, Oklahoma)
- College: Oklahoma (1985–1989)
- NBA draft: 1989: 1st round, 6th overall pick
- Drafted by: Chicago Bulls
- Playing career: 1989–1999
- Position: Power forward / center
- Number: 34, 21, 33
- Coaching career: 2000–2003

Career history

Playing
- 1989–1994: Chicago Bulls
- 1994–1995: Minnesota Timberwolves
- 1995–1996: Miami Heat
- 1996–1997: Grand Rapids Hoops
- 1997: Sioux Falls Skyforce
- 1997: Boston Celtics
- 1997: Dallas Mavericks
- 1997–1998: Antalya Büyükşehir Belediyesi
- 1998: Sioux Falls Skyforce
- 1998–1999: Atenas de Córdoba

Career highlights
- 3× NBA champion (1991–1993); NBA All-Rookie Second Team (1990); Sporting News Player of the Year (1989); Consensus first-team All-American (1989); Big Eight Player of the Year (1989); First-team All-Big Eight (1989); No. 33 honored by Oklahoma Sooners

Career NBA statistics
- Points: 2,819 (6.4 ppg)
- Rebounds: 1,460 (3.3 rpg)
- Blocks: 210 (0.5 bpg)
- Stats at NBA.com
- Stats at Basketball Reference

Ronald Stacey King (January 29, 1967 – June 7, 2026) was an American professional basketball player and sports announcer. He played as a center in the National Basketball Association (NBA) and won three consecutive championships with the Chicago Bulls in 1991, 1992, and 1993. He played college basketball for the Oklahoma Sooners, earning national player of the year honors in 1989. After retiring as a player, King had a brief stint as a head coach in the Continental Basketball Association before becoming the color commentator for the Bulls on their television broadcasts from the 2006–07 season until his death in 2026.

== Early life and college career ==
King was born on January 29, 1967, in Lawton, Oklahoma. He attended Lawton High School, where he averaged 18.4 points and 8 rebounds in his senior year, eliciting moderate attention from colleges. He played college basketball at the University of Oklahoma from 1985 to 1989. He averaged six points in his freshman year and seven points in his sophomore year. After the conclusion of his sophomore year, in which the Sooners lost to Iowa in the 1987 NCAA tournament, King contemplated transferring from Oklahoma. He was frustrated with his limited minutes during the closing game, but he was convinced by academic advisor Rick Pryor, head coach Billy Tubbs, and his parents to stay. He worked with a construction team at Remington Park during the summer, but was convinced to focus more on his basketball career for his next season.

During the 1987–88 season, King was recognized as "a star on a star-studded team." He averaged 22.3 points, 8.5 rebounds and 2.6 blocks, and posted the second most blocked shots in the Big Eight Conference with 103. King led the Sooners to the 1988 NCAA championship game, their first appearance in 41 years. He recorded 17 points, 7 rebounds, and 2 blocks during the game, but Oklahoma ultimately lost to Kansas. He was named the MVP of the tournament and pledged to remain at Oklahoma and finish his degree. The Sooners' 1988–89 season saw King average 26.0 points, 10.1 rebounds, and 2.3 blocks on 52.3% shooting, leading the Big Eight Conference in points and blocks per game. He earned the Big Eight Player of the Year award, a first team All-American selection, and The Sporting News Player of the Year award. In Sooners history, he ranks sixth in total points (2,008) and eighth in total rebounds (825).

== Professional career ==
=== Chicago Bulls (1989–1994) ===
After a standout college career at Oklahoma, King was projected to be a top pick in the 1989 NBA draft, particularly for teams in need of a power forward. He was selected sixth overall by the Chicago Bulls. In his rookie season, King played all 82 games for the Bulls, averaging 8.9 points and 4.7 rebounds in 21.7 minutes and being the team's lead rebounder in six games. He scored a career-high 24 points along with 5 rebounds, 3 blocks, and 3 steals in a 122–97 win over the Washington Bullets on March 20, 1990. In the playoffs, he averaged 17 points and 5 rebounds in his two starts in place for Scottie Pippen in the Eastern Conference semifinals against the Philadelphia 76ers. He ended the season earning a selection on the NBA All-Rookie Second Team.

Compared to his rookie year, King's sophomore season was a relative disappointment, with his averages decreasing to 5.5 points and 2.7 rebounds in 15.8 minutes. The season was filled with several off-court incidents, such as a family illness which restricted King from participating in practices and led to him starting the season overweight, his public discontent with the amount of minutes he was receiving, and eventually a walkout from practice near the end of the season, which led to a one-game suspension, further reduced playing time and a game in which he was booed at home. Regardless, King recalled playing well in place for Bill Cartwright for several weeks, and the team eventually won the 1991 NBA Finals for the franchise's first NBA championship.

MJ got on everybody when it came to basketball... But as a person, if Stacey wasn't in that locker room, it wouldn't have been the same and we all knew that. Stacey always took the edge off with his jokes when we were tight, in those playoff games against the Knicks and Pistons. Or if we needed someone to pick on, he was there too. And we all loved him for it.

— Horace Grant, 2012

Jack Maloney of CBS Sports wrote, "King never lived up to the hype from his stellar college career or became a full-time starter with the Bulls". NBA writer Sam Smith regarded him as a miscast on a roster already with forwards Horace Grant and Scottie Pippen. The team encouraged him to be a "piece of the puzzle" and general manager Jerry Krause emphasized his role as a defender rather than a scorer. While initially upset with being a role player, King went on to accept his position for the sake of winning. He played the role of a rotational bench player during the Michael Jordan-led dynasty in the early 1990s, winning three NBA championships in 1991, 1992, and 1993, notably contributing to Chicago's 15-point comeback in the fourth quarter of game 6 of the 1992 Finals to claim the championship. Grant regarded King's presence in the locker room as important to the team's success.

During his final season with the Bulls in the 1993–94 season, King averaged 5.5 points and 4.3 rebounds in 17 minutes, missing 15 games due to a right ankle sprain. In total, he averaged 6.6 points and 3.3 rebounds during his tenure with Chicago, being "remembered fondly for his personality as a Bull" after his playing career.

=== Later career (1994–1999) ===
On February 24, 1994, just before the season's trade deadline, the Bulls sent King to the Minnesota Timberwolves in exchange for Luc Longley and a second-round draft pick. The Timberwolves in that time were described as a "losing team" and "where NBA careers went to die", but King was excited to make a name for himself. His first season with Minnesota was one of his best statistically, averaging 11.8 points and 6.1 rebounds. However, he did not reflect fondly on his tenure due to the team's lack of professionalism. The Chicago Tribune described it as "a maddening season and a half".

He signed with the Miami Heat in October 1995, but issues with injuries led to King appearing in only 15 games and averaging 2.5 points and 1.5 rebounds during the 1995–96 season. After he was released by the Heat, he signed with the Grand Rapids Hoops of the Continental Basketball Association, and later the CBA's Sioux Falls Skyforce, where his health and availability improved. In the 1996–97 season, King signed 10-day contracts with the Dallas Mavericks and Boston Celtics but was not able to secure a permanent role on either team as they prioritized younger talents. In his last two seasons in the NBA, he played only 26 total games.

Deciding to play overseas, King signed with the Antalya Büyükşehir Belediyesi in Turkey, playing with them from 1997 to 1998. After settling a payment dispute with Antalya, he returned to the Skyforce in 1998, averaging 14 points and 7 rebounds and helping them reach the CBA Finals in which they lost to the Quad City Thunder. He then signed with Atenas de Córdoba in Argentina for the 1998–99 season but played only six games due to injuries before being released. He retired from professional basketball afterwards.

== Post-playing career ==
=== Coaching (2001–2003) ===
Stacey King became an assistant coach for the CBA's Rockford Lightning in the 2000–01 season. On January 15, 2001, he was promoted to head coach after the resignation of Bob Salmi, who had led the team to a 4–11 record earlier in the season. By the end of January, King had led the Lightning to six wins and two losses. Returning for the 2001–02 season, King led the Lightning to their first CBA Finals appearance in 16 years, where they lost 116–109 to the Dakota Wizards. King later coached his former team, the Skyforce.

=== Television commentary (2006–2026) ===
After retiring from coaching to spend more time with his children, King began his commentary career in 2004 with Comcast SportsNet as a studio analyst for pre-game and post-game shows for the Chicago Bulls. He was a game analyst during the 2006 NBA playoffs. He became a game broadcaster for the Bulls in the 2006–07 season. In 2008, he became the lead color commentator along with Neil Funk. King continued in that role when Funk was succeeded by Adam Amin in 2020 until the channel's closure in 2024. King then transitioned to Chicago Sports Network and retained his role as lead color commentator along with Amin.

Funk said, "the one thing Stacey has is the ability of not only being entertaining but informative and he's able to articulate that, which is a rare combination". King cited Dick Vitale, Bill Raftery, Kevin Harlan, and Gus Johnson as inspirations for his commentary style. He was known for his enthusiasm, humor, and use of various nicknames and catchphrases. The Bulls featured a soundboard of his most popular lines on their website. He told ESPN, "[he] kind of say[s] things a fan would say on the couch watching the Bulls game". While dedicated to entertaining viewers, he stated that he took his job as an analyst seriously. King was praised for his commentary and ability to break down plays. Nick Friedell, who previously worked alongside King, called him a "a strong technical analyst" but said he would be most remembered for "his ability to have fun no matter how good or bad the product was on the floor".

Coinciding with the Bulls success behind Derrick Rose, who was named the NBA Most Valuable Player in 2011 and led them to the top seed, King became a "star in his own right" with his calls gaining a cult following. One of his most iconic calls was when Rose dunked over Goran Dragić during a game against the Phoenix Suns on January 22, 2010, where he remarked, "What are you doing, Dragić? Did you not get the memo? Derrick Rose can go upstairs!". King later said that the dunk "kind of made me famous" and "got my catchphrases going". His calls on Rose's plays, including his widely recognized "Too big, too strong, too fast, too good" catchphrase, contributed to Rose's fame and legacy.

By 2012, King's popularity rivaled that of Kerr and his lines were being used on national telecasts by other broadcasters. His pairing with Funk was one of the NBA's most popular broadcasting teams, winning an Emmy in 2013. The Chicago Tribune wrote that King spent most of his broadcasting career "breathing life" into mediocre seasons, as the Bulls qualified for the playoffs only twice in his final 10 years with the team.

== Personal life and death ==
According to the Chicago Sun-Times, King "always had a big personality" and "enjoyed being the center of attention". He described himself as a "man of the people", staying after the end of Bulls games to sign autographs. King was married from 1988 until divorcing his wife in 2008. He was reportedly engaged with Kathleen McGuire as of 2012, but they later split as he married Debi King in 2017, who he remained with until his death. He had four sons: Erick, Garrett, Brandon, and Mason.

King's mother died on December 25, 2010. He announced on social media that his older brother, Edward King, died on May 3, 2020, after contracting COVID-19, urging people to protect themselves from the virus amid the pandemic.

King was found dead at his home in River Forest, Illinois, on June 7, 2026, at the age of 59. It was reported that he had fallen at his home. On August 4, his official cause of death was revealed to be hypertensive cardiovascular disease.

== Career statistics ==
Legend
GP	Games played	GS	Games started	MPG	Minutes per game
FG%	Field goal percentage	3P%	3-point field goal percentage	FT%	Free throw percentage
RPG	Rebounds per game	APG	Assists per game	SPG	Steals per game
BPG	Blocks per game	PPG	Points per game	**Bold**	Career high
†	Won an NBA championship	*	Led the league

=== NBA ===
==== Regular season ====
Stacey King regular season statistics
Year	Team	GP	GS	MPG	FG%	3P%	FT%	RPG	APG	SPG	BPG	PPG
1989–90	Chicago	**82***	2	21.7	.504	.000	.727	4.7	1.1	.5	.7	8.9
1990–91†	Chicago	76	6	15.8	.467	.000	.704	2.7	.9	.3	.6	5.5
1991–92†	Chicago	79	12	16.1	.506	**.400**	**.753**	2.6	1.0	.3	.3	7.0
1992–93†	Chicago	76	3	13.9	.471	.333	.705	2.7	.9	.3	.3	5.4
1993–94	Chicago	31	**15**	17.3	.398	.000	.679	4.3	**1.3**	.6	.4	5.5
1993–94	Minnesota	18	**15**	**28.7**	.459	—	.687	**6.1**	1.1	**.7**	**1.7**	**11.8**
1994–95	Minnesota	50	10	15.8	.467	.000	.667	3.3	.5	.5	.4	5.3
1995–96	Miami	15	0	10.4	.472	—	.500	1.5	.1	.5	.1	2.5
1996–97	Boston	5	0	6.6	**.714**	—	.667	1.8	.2	.0	.2	2.4
1996–97	Dallas	6	0	11.7	.400	—	.000	3.0	.0	.3	.0	2.0
Career		438	63	16.9	.478	.235	.707	3.3	.9	.4	.5	6.4

==== Playoffs ====
Stacey King playoff statistics
Year	Team	GP	GS	MPG	FG%	3P%	FT%	RPG	APG	SPG	BPG	PPG
1990	Chicago	16	**2**	**17.6**	.407	.000	.766	**3.2**	.6	.4	**.5**	**6.9**
1991†	Chicago	11	0	7.8	.296	.000	.636	2.0	.2	.1	.1	2.1
1992†	Chicago	14	0	7.9	**.450**	**1.000**	.652	1.4	.4	.4	.1	3.8
1993†	Chicago	**19**	0	12.1	.394	—	**.806**	2.1	.7	**.5**	.2	4.1
1996	Miami	1	0	12.0	.000	—	.500	3.0	**1.0**	.0	.0	1.0
Career		61	2	11.8	.392	.500	.737	2.2	.5	.3	.2	4.3

=== College ===
Stacey King college statistics
Year	Team	GP	GS	MPG	FG%	3P%	FT%	RPG	APG	SPG	BPG	PPG
1985–86	Oklahoma	14	1	16.4	.388	—	**.744**	3.8	.3	.3	1.9	6.0
1986–87	Oklahoma	28	14	15.8	.441	**.000**	.621	3.9	.5	.4	0.9	7.0
1987–88	Oklahoma	**39**	**38**	31.1	**.544**	**.000**	.675	8.5	1.1	.8	**2.6**	22.3
1988–89	Oklahoma	33	—	**34.6**	.524	—	.718	**10.1**	**1.9**	**1.2**	2.3	**26.0**
Career		114	53	26.5	.516	.000	.690	7.2	1.1	.7	2.0	17.6
