= 1987–88 Kansas State Wildcats men's basketball team =

American college basketball season

1987–88 Kansas State Wildcats men's basketball

Sun-Met Classic champions

NCAA tournament, Elite Eight
- Conference: Big Eight Conference

Ranking
- Coaches: No. 20
- AP: No. 20
- Record: 25–9 (11–3 Big Eight)
- Head coach: Lon Kruger (2nd season)
- Assistant coaches: Dana Altman (2nd season); Greg Grensing
- Home arena: Ahearn Field House

1987–88 Big Eight Conference men's basketball standings
	Conf.				Overall
Team	W		L	PCT	W		L	PCT
No. 4 Oklahoma†	12	–	2	.857	35	–	4	.897
No. 20 Kansas State	11	–	3	.786	25	–	9	.735
Kansas	9	–	5	.643	27	–	11	.711
Missouri	7	–	7	.500	19	–	11	.633
Iowa State	6	–	8	.429	20	–	12	.625
Oklahoma State	4	–	10	.286	14	–	16	.467
Nebraska	4	–	10	.286	13	–	18	.419
Colorado	3	–	11	.214	7	–	21	.250
† 1988 Big Eight tournament winner As of March 3, 2012; Rankings from AP poll

The 1987–88 Kansas State Wildcats men's basketball team represented Kansas State University in the 1987-88 NCAA Division I men's basketball season. The head coach was Lon Kruger who was in his second of four years at the helm of his alma mater. The Wildcats tied a then-school record with 25 wins and advanced to the Elite Eight of the NCAA Tournament.

The team played its home games in Ahearn Field House in Manhattan, Kansas. It was the last season the team played in Ahearn Field House before moving into Bramlage Coliseum. Kansas State was a member of the Big 8 Conference.

== Roster ==
1987–88 Kansas State Wildcats men's basketball team
Players
Coaches

Pos.	#	Name	Height	Weight	Year	Hometown
G	12	Steve Henson	5 ft 11 in (1.8 m)	170 lb (77 kg)	So	McPherson, Kansas
G	23	Mitch Richmond	6 ft 5 in (1.96 m)	210 lb (95 kg)	Sr	Fort Lauderdale, Florida

Head coach

- Lon Kruger (Kansas State)

Assistant coach(es)

- Dana Altman (Eastern New Mexico)

Legend

- (C) Team captain
- (S) Suspended
- (I) Ineligible
- (W) Walk-on
- Injured
- Current redshirt

Roster

=== Starting line-up ===
This was the starting five for the last game of the regular season, against Missouri on March 5, 1988.

Position	Player
Forward	Mitch Richmond
Forward	Charles Bledsoe
Center	Ron Meyer
Guard	Steve Henson
Guard	Will Scott

=== Class of 1987 recruits ===
College recruiting information
Name	Hometown	School	Height	Weight	Commit date
Carlos Diggins; SG	South Bend, IN	Clay HS / Butler County CC	6 ft 4 in (1.93 m)	200 lb (91 kg)	
Carlos Diggins; SG	Recruit ratings: No ratings found				
Buster Glover; SG	Gary, IN	Lew Wallace HS / Allen County CC	6 ft 0 in (1.83 m)	155 lb (70 kg)	
Buster Glover; SG	Recruit ratings: No ratings found				
Fred McCoy; PF	Washington, DC	Woodson HS / Allen County CC	6 ft 7 in (2.01 m)	230 lb (100 kg)	
Fred McCoy; PF	Recruit ratings: No ratings found				
John Rettiger; C	Strong City, Kansas	Chase County HS	6 ft 9 in (2.06 m)	210 lb (95 kg)	
John Rettiger; C	Recruit ratings: No ratings found				
Overall recruit ranking:
Note: In many cases, Scout, Rivals, 247Sports, On3, and ESPN may conflict in their listings of height and weight.; In these cases, the average was taken. ESPN grades are on a 100-point scale.; Sources:

== Schedule ==
Date time, TV	Rank^{#}	Opponent^{#}	Result	Record	Site city, state
Regular Season
11/27/87*		vs. San Diego State; Sun Met Classic	W 79–68	1–0	Selland Arena (10,159); Fresno, CA
11/28/87*		vs. Fresno State; Sun Met Classic	W 65–50	2–0	Selland Arena (10,159); Fresno, CA
11/30/87*		Cal-State Northridge	W 79–68	3–0	Ahearn Field House (10,500); Manhattan, KS
12/2/87*		UMKC	W 81–54	4–0	Ahearn Field House (10,400); Manhattan, KS
12/5/87*		at Creighton	W 88–78	5–0	Omaha Civic Auditorium (5,787); Omaha, NE
12/8/87*		Southwest Missouri State	L 80–82 ^{4OT}	5–1	Ahearn Field House (10,800); Manhattan, KS
12/17/87*		Southern Miss	L 69–71	5–2	Ahearn Field House (9,500); Manhattan, KS
12/20/87*		at No. 12 Purdue	L 72–101	5–3	Mackey Arena (14,123); West Lafayette, IN
12/31/87*		at Utah State	W 81–69	6–3	Smith Spectrum (5,735); Logan, UT
1/3/88*		vs. Marquette	W 78–57	7–3	Kemper Arena (6,724); Kansas City, MO
1/11/88*		at Southern Miss	L 89–91 ^{OT}	7–4	Reed Green Coliseum (7,512); Hattiesburg, MS
1/16/88		No. 3 Oklahoma	W 69–62	8–4 (1–0)	Ahearn Field House (11,220); Manhattan, KS
1/19/88*		Wichita State	W 58–47	9–4	Ahearn Field House (11,220); Manhattan, KS
1/23/88		at Oklahoma State	W 76–60	10–4 (2–0)	Gallagher-Iba Arena (6,381); Stillwater, OK
1/27/88		at Colorado	W 68–60	11–4 (3–0)	CU Events/Conference Center (3,132); Boulder, CO
1/30/88		at Kansas; Sunflower Showdown	W 72–61	12–4 (4–0)	Allen Fieldhouse (15,800); Lawrence, KS
2/3/88		No. 16 Iowa State	W 79–68 ^{OT}	13–4 (5–0)	Ahearn Field House (11,220); Manhattan, KS
2/6/88		Nebraska	W 65–63	14–4 (6–0)	Ahearn Field House (11,220); Manhattan, KS
2/9/88	No. 14	at Missouri	L 75–79	14–5 (6–1)	Hearnes Center (13,028); Columbia, MO
2/13/88	No. 14	at No. 4 Oklahoma	L 95–112	14–6 (6–2)	Lloyd Noble Center (11,327); Norman, OK
2/16/88		Colorado	W 83–65	15–6 (7–2)	Ahearn Field House (10,400); Manhattan, KS
2/18/88		Kansas; Sunflower Showdown	L 63–64	15–7 (7–3)	Ahearn Field House (11,220); Manhattan, KS
2/22/88*		Northern Illinois	W 88–67	16–7	Ahearn Field House (9,500); Manhattan, KS
2/24/88		at Iowa State	W 83–66	17–7 (8–3)	Hilton Coliseum (14,263); Ames, IA
2/27/88		Oklahoma State	W 59–58	18–7 (9–3)	Ahearn Field House (11,220); Manhattan, KS
3/2/88		at Nebraska	W 77–67	19–7 (10–3)	NU Sports Complex (13,487); Lincoln, NE
3/5/88		Missouri	W 92–82	20–7 (11–3)	Ahearn Field House (11,850); Manhattan, KS
Big 8 Tournament
3/11/88		vs. Nebraska; Big 8 Tournament – Quarterfinals	W 75–70	21–7	Kemper Arena (16,900); Kansas City, MO
3/12/88		vs. Kansas; Big 8 Tournament – Semifinals	W 69–54	22–7	Kemper Arena (16,904); Kansas City, MO
3/13/88; ABC		vs. No. 4 Oklahoma; Big 8 Tournament – Championship game	L 83–88	22–8	Kemper Arena (15,953); Kansas City, MO
NCAA Tournament
3/17/88	No. 20	vs. La Salle; NCAA tournament Opening Round	W 66–53	23–8	Edmund P. Joyce Center (10,760); South Bend, IN
3/19/88; CBS	No. 20	vs. DePaul; NCAA Tournament Second Round	W 66–58	24–8	Edmund P. Joyce Center (10,760); South Bend, IN
3/25/88; CBS	No. 20	vs. No. 3 Purdue; NCAA Tournament Sweet Sixteen	W 73–70	25–8	Pontiac Silverdome (31,309); Pontiac, MI
3/27/88; CBS	No. 20	vs. Kansas; NCAA Tournament Elite Eight	L 58–71	25–9	Pontiac Silverdome (31,632); Pontiac, MI
*Non-conference game. ^{#}Rankings from AP Poll. (#) Tournament seedings in parentheses.

== Awards and honors ==
- Mitch Richmond – Consensus Second-team All-American

== NBA draft ==
Round	Pick	Player	NBA club
1	5	Mitch Richmond	Sacramento Kings
