= Ed Hightower =

American educator and basketball referee

Edward E. "Ed" Hightower is an American educator and former college basketball referee.

Hightower has refereed 12 NCAA Division I Final Fours. He also officiated the 1990 World Championship of Basketball in South America, the European Basketball Championship in 1993, and the Goodwill Games in 1994 and 1998. He is a frequent official in Big Ten and Big East games. Hightower was voted the Naismith Division I Men’s College Basketball Official of the Year in 1992. In 1995, he received the National Association of Sports Officials’ Gold Whistle Award. In 1998, he was inducted into the Illinois Basketball Coaches Association Hall of Fame. He retired from officiating on December 22, 2013, after his final game between the Iowa Hawkeyes and Arkansas-Pine Bluff Golden Lions in Iowa City.

Hightower holds bachelor, master, and specialist degrees from Southern Illinois University Edwardsville and a doctorate in Education Administration from St. Louis University. A lifelong educator, he was the superintendent of Edwardsville, Illinois School District #7 (which includes Edwardsville High School) until he retired after the end of the 2014–15 school year, and he was formerly vice chairman of the Southern Illinois University Board of Trustees. He serves on the Boards of Directors for Lewis and Clark Community College in Godfrey and St. Anthony's Hospital in Alton. Among his non-sports awards, he received the 1990 Elijah P. Lovejoy Human Rights Award, the Illinois Jaycees 10 Outstanding Young Persons Award, the 1989 Illinois Distinguished Principals Award, 1993 Illinois Principal of the Year Award, and he was selected as the 2007 Trails West Distinguished Citizen of the Year.

Hightower and his wife, Barbara, have two daughters, Julie and Jennifer. He and his family reside in Edwardsville, where he is also involved in his church and the Edwardsville Rotary Club.

He is the central subject of The Whistleblower, a book about college basketball refereeing.
