= 1987–88 Kansas Jayhawks men's basketball team =

American college basketball season

1987–88 Kansas Jayhawks men's basketball
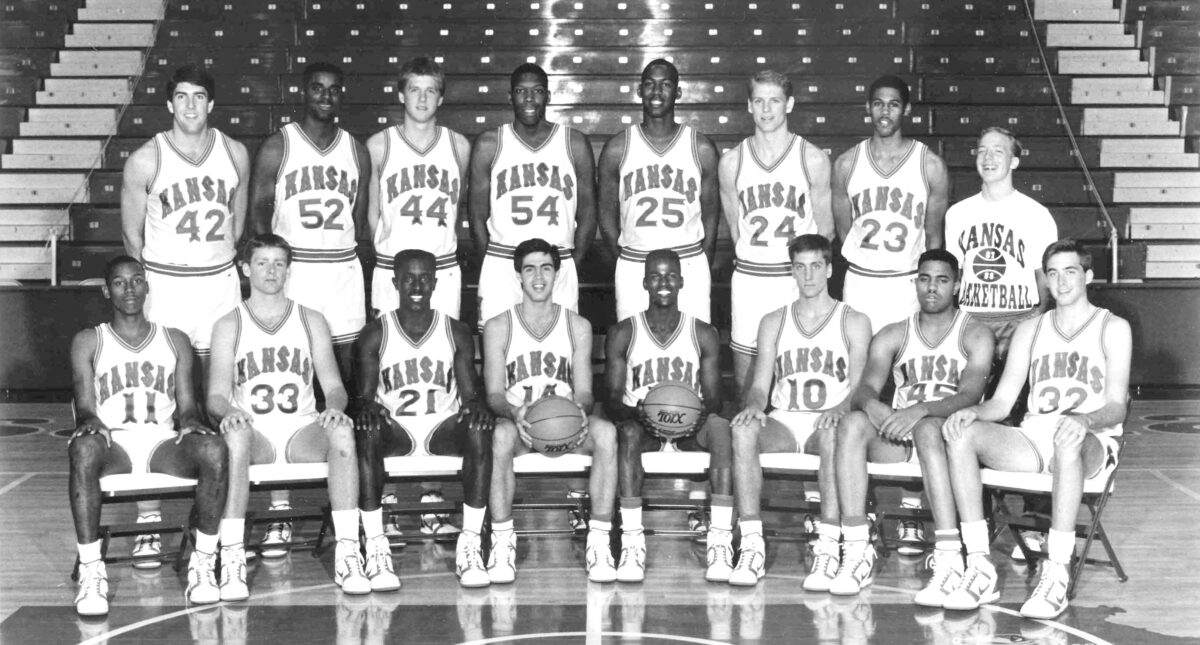

NCAA tournament National Champions

National Championship Game, W 83–79 vs. Oklahoma
- Conference: Big 8 Conference
- Record: 27–11 (9–5 Big 8)
- Head coach: Larry Brown (5th season)
- Assistant coaches: R. C. Buford (5th season); Alvin Gentry (2nd season); Ed Manning (5th season); John Robic (2nd season); Mark Turgeon (1st season)
- Captains: Danny Manning; Archie Marshall; Chris Piper
- Home arena: Allen Fieldhouse

1987–88 Big Eight Conference men's basketball standings
	Conf.				Overall
Team	W		L	PCT	W		L	PCT
No. 4 Oklahoma†	12	–	2	.857	35	–	4	.897
No. 20 Kansas State	11	–	3	.786	25	–	9	.735
Kansas	9	–	5	.643	27	–	11	.711
Missouri	7	–	7	.500	19	–	11	.633
Iowa State	6	–	8	.429	20	–	12	.625
Oklahoma State	4	–	10	.286	14	–	16	.467
Nebraska	4	–	10	.286	13	–	18	.419
Colorado	3	–	11	.214	7	–	21	.250
† 1988 Big Eight tournament winner As of March 3, 2012; Rankings from AP poll

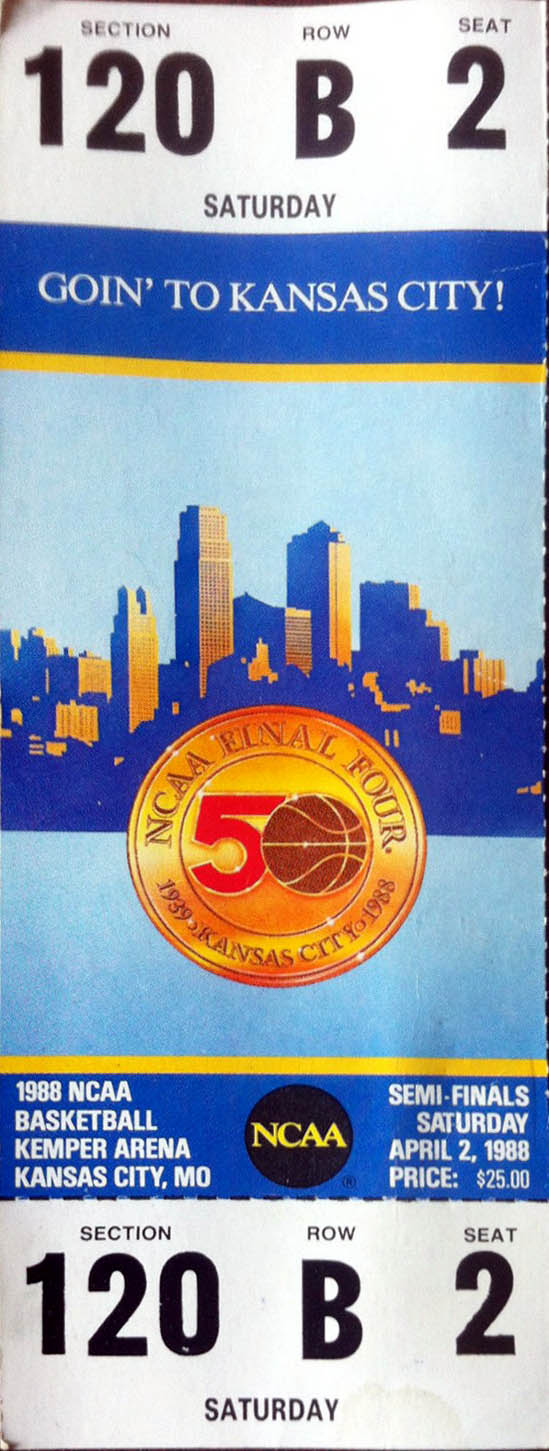
Kansas defeated Duke in the Final Four to go on and earn their second-ever NCAA tournament championship in 1988

The 1987–88 Kansas Jayhawks men's basketball team represented the University of Kansas for the NCAA Division I men's intercollegiate basketball season of 1987–1988. The team won the 1987–1988 NCAA Division I men's basketball championship, the second in the school's history. They were led by Larry Brown in his fifth and final season as head coach. Their star player, Danny Manning, earned the team the nickname "Danny and the Miracles" because of the Jayhawks' improbable tournament run after an 11-loss season, the most ever by a national champion. The team played its home games in Allen Fieldhouse in Lawrence, Kansas. In their last three games of the NCAA tournament, the Jayhawks avenged their three home losses to Kansas State, Duke, and Oklahoma.

This season also marked the creation by a group of KU students of the famous "Beware of THE PHOG" banner. It was first displayed for the Duke game on February 20, 1988, and then again for that season's final home game on March 5, the Senior Night celebrations honoring Danny Manning and the other KU seniors, Archie Marshall and Chris Piper. It came down after that, and the students gave the banner to Phog Allen's granddaughter Judy Morris. Morris told Kansas Assistant Athletic Director Floyd Temple she thought the banner should remain a fixture in Allen Fieldhouse, and Temple agreed.

== Roster ==
Name	#	Position	Height	Weight	Year	Home Town
Sean Alvarado	52	Center	6-10	210	Senior(RS)	Washington, D.C.
Scooter Barry	10	Guard	6-3	175	Junior	Concord, California
Marvin Branch	54	Center	6-10	225	Junior	Detroit, Michigan
Jeff Gueldner	33	Guard/Forward	6-5	180	Sophomore	Charleston, Illinois
Keith Harris	45	Forward	6-6	205	Sophomore	Santa Monica, California
Otis Livingston	12	Guard	6-0	150	Junior	San Pedro, California
Mike Maddox	32	Forward	6-8	195	Freshman	Reseda, California
Danny Manning	25	Forward/Center	6-10	230	Senior	Lawrence, Kansas
Archie Marshall	23	Forward	6-7	190	Senior	Tulsa, Oklahoma
Mike Masucci	44	Center	6-10	200	Freshman	Grandview, Missouri
Marvin Mattox	54	Forward	6-4	210	Senior	Pomona, California
Lincoln Minor	11	Guard	6-3	165	Junior	Houston, Texas
Milt Newton	21	Guard/Forward	6-5	185	Junior	Washington, D.C.
Clint Normore	4	Guard	6-0	200	Junior	Wichita, Kansas
Chris Piper	24	Forward	6-8	200	Senior	Lawrence, Kansas
Kevin Pritchard	14	Guard	6-3	170	Sophomore	Tulsa, Oklahoma
Mark Randall	42	Forward	6-9	200	Sophomore(RS)	Englewood, Colorado

== Schedule ==
Date time, TV	Rank^{#}	Opponent^{#}	Result	Record	Site city, state
Regular Season
November 27, 1987*	No. 7	vs. Chaminade; Maui Invitational	W 89–62	1–0	Lahaina Civic Center; Lahaina, Hawaii
November 28, 1987*	No. 7	vs. No. 11 Iowa; Maui Invitational	L 81–100	1–1	Lahaina Civic Center; Lahaina, Hawaii
November 29, 1987*	No. 7	vs. Illinois; Maui Invitational	L 75–81	1–2	Lahaina Civic Center; Lahaina, Hawaii
December 1, 1987*	No. 16	Pomona-Pitzer	W 94–38	2–2	Allen Fieldhouse; Lawrence, Kansas
December 3, 1987*	No. 16	at Western Carolina	W 68–63	3–2	Ramsey Center; Cullowhee, North Carolina
December 5, 1987*	No. 16	St. John's	W 63–54	4–2	Allen Fieldhouse; Lawrence, Kansas
December 7, 1987*	No. 18	Appalachian State	W 73–62	5–2	Allen Fieldhouse; Lawrence, Kansas
December 12, 1987*	No. 18	Rider	W 110–72	6–2	Allen Fieldhouse; Lawrence, Kansas
December 19, 1987*; ABC	No. 17	at NC State	W 74–67	7–2	Reynolds Coliseum; Raleigh, North Carolina
December 28, 1987*	No. 17	vs. Memphis State	W 64–62	8–2	Madison Square Garden; New York City, New York
December 30, 1987*	No. 17	vs. St. John's	L 56–70	8–3	Madison Square Garden; New York City, New York
January 4, 1988*	No. 18	at Washington	W 67–57	9–3	Hec Edmundson Pavilion; Seattle, Washington
January 6, 1988*	No. 18	American	W 90–69	10–3	Allen Fieldhouse; Lawrence, Kansas
January 9, 1988	No. 18	Missouri; Border War	W 78–74	11–3	Allen Fieldhouse; Lawrence, Kansas
January 13, 1988	No. 16	at No. 14 Iowa State	L 78–88	11–4	Hilton Coliseum; Ames, Iowa
January 16, 1988*	No. 16	Hampton	W 95–69	12–4	Allen Fieldhouse; Lawrence, Kansas
January 23, 1988*	No. 16	at Notre Dame	L 76–80	12–5	Edmund P. Joyce Center; South Bend, Indiana
January 27, 1988		at Nebraska	L 68–70	12–6	Bob Devaney Sports Center; Lincoln, Nebraska
January 30, 1988		Kansas State	L 61–72	12–7	Allen Fieldhouse; Lawrence, Kansas
February 3, 1988		No. 7 Oklahoma	L 65–73	12–8	Allen Fieldhouse; Lawrence, Kansas
February 6, 1988		Colorado	W 73–62	13–8	Allen Fieldhouse; Lawrence, Kansas
February 10, 1988		at Oklahoma State	W 78–68	14–8	Gallagher-Iba Arena; Stillwater, Oklahoma
February 13, 1988		Iowa State	W 82–72	15–8	Allen Fieldhouse; Lawrence, Kansas
February 16, 1988		Nebraska	W 70–48	16–8	Allen Fieldhouse; Lawrence, Kansas
February 18, 1988; ESPN		at Kansas State	W 64–63	17–8	Ahearn Field House; Manhattan, Kansas
February 20, 1988*		No. 6 Duke	L 70–74 ^{OT}	17–9	Allen Fieldhouse; Lawrence, Kansas
February 24, 1988		at No. 4 Oklahoma	L 87–95	17–10	Lloyd Noble Center; Norman, Oklahoma
February 27, 1988		at No. 15 Missouri; Border War	W 82–77	18–10	Hearnes Center; Columbia, Missouri
March 2, 1988		at Colorado	W 85–64	19–10	Coors Events Center; Boulder, Colorado
March 5, 1988		Oklahoma State	W 75–57	20–10	Allen Fieldhouse; Lawrence, Kansas
Big 8 Tournament
March 11, 1988*		vs. Oklahoma State; Big 8 Conference Tournament Quarterfinals	W 74–58	21–10	Kemper Arena; Kansas City, Missouri
March 12, 1988*		vs. Kansas State; Big 8 Conference Tournament Semifinals	L 54–69	21–11	Kemper Arena; Kansas City, Missouri
NCAA Tournament
March 18, 1988*		vs. No. 18 Xavier first round	W 85–72	22–11	Bob Devaney Sports Center; Lincoln, Nebraska
March 20, 1988*		vs. Murray State; Second Round	W 61–58	23–11	Bob Devaney Sports Center; Lincoln, Nebraska
March 25, 1988*		vs. Vanderbilt; Sweet Sixteen	W 77–64	24–11	Pontiac Silverdome; Pontiac, Michigan
March 27, 1988*; CBS		vs. No. 20 Kansas State; Elite Eight	W 71–58	25–11	Pontiac Silverdome; Pontiac, Michigan
April 2, 1988*; CBS		vs. No. 5 Duke; Final Four	W 66–59	26–11	Kemper Arena; Kansas City, Missouri
April 4, 1988*; CBS		vs. No. 4 Oklahoma; National Championship game	W 83–79	27–11	Kemper Arena; Kansas City, Missouri
*Non-conference game. ^{#}Rankings from AP Poll. (#) Tournament seedings in parentheses.

== Rankings ==
Poll	Pre	Wk 1	Wk 2	Wk 3	Wk 4	Wk 5	Wk 6	Wk 7	Wk 8	Wk 9	Wk 10	Wk 11	Wk 12	Wk 13	Wk 14	Wk 15	Wk 16	Wk 17	Wk 18	Wk 19	Final
AP	7	16	18	17	18	17	18	16	16	NR	NR	NR	NR	NR	NR	NR	NR	NR	NR	NR	NR

== Awards and honors ==
- Larry Brown, Naismith College Coach of the Year
- Danny Manning, NCAA Men's MOP Award
- Danny Manning, Naismith College Player of the Year
- Danny Manning, John R. Wooden Award

== Team players drafted into the NBA ==
Year	Round	Pick	Player	NBA club
1988	1	1	Danny Manning	Los Angeles Clippers
1988	3	75	Archie Marshall	San Antonio Spurs
1990	2	34	Kevin Pritchard	Golden State Warriors
1991	1	26	Mark Randall	Chicago Bulls
