= 1988 Big Eight Conference men's basketball tournament =

- Classification: Division I
- Season: 1987–88
- Teams: 8
- Finals site: Kemper Arena; Kansas City, MO
- Champions: Oklahoma (3rd title)
- Winning coach: Billy Tubbs (2nd title)
- MVP: Stacey King (Oklahoma)
- Television: Raycom Sports (Quarterfinals, Semi-Finals and Championship); ABC (Championship game)

1987–88 Big Eight Conference men's basketball standings
	Conf.				Overall
Team	W		L	PCT	W		L	PCT
No. 4 Oklahoma†	12	–	2	.857	35	–	4	.897
No. 20 Kansas State	11	–	3	.786	25	–	9	.735
Kansas	9	–	5	.643	27	–	11	.711
Missouri	7	–	7	.500	19	–	11	.633
Iowa State	6	–	8	.429	20	–	12	.625
Oklahoma State	4	–	10	.286	14	–	16	.467
Nebraska	4	–	10	.286	13	–	18	.419
Colorado	3	–	11	.214	7	–	21	.250
† 1988 Big Eight tournament winner As of March 3, 2012; Rankings from AP poll

The 1988 Big Eight Conference men's basketball tournament was held March 10–12 at Kemper Arena in Kansas City, Missouri.

Top-seeded Oklahoma defeated #2 seed Kansas State in the championship game, 88–83, to earn the conference's automatic bid to the 1988 NCAA tournament.

== Bracket ==
Quarterfinals; Friday, March 10
1	#4 Oklahoma	99
8	Colorado	66
4	Missouri	90
5	Iowa State	80
3	Kansas	74
6	Oklahoma State	58
7	Nebraska	70
2	Kansas State	75

Semifinals; Saturday, March 11
1	#4 Oklahoma	102
4	Missouri	99
3	Kansas	54
2	Kansas State	69

Championship; Sunday, March 12
1	#4 Oklahoma	88
2	Kansas State	83
