= Danny Manning =

American basketball player and coach (born 1966)

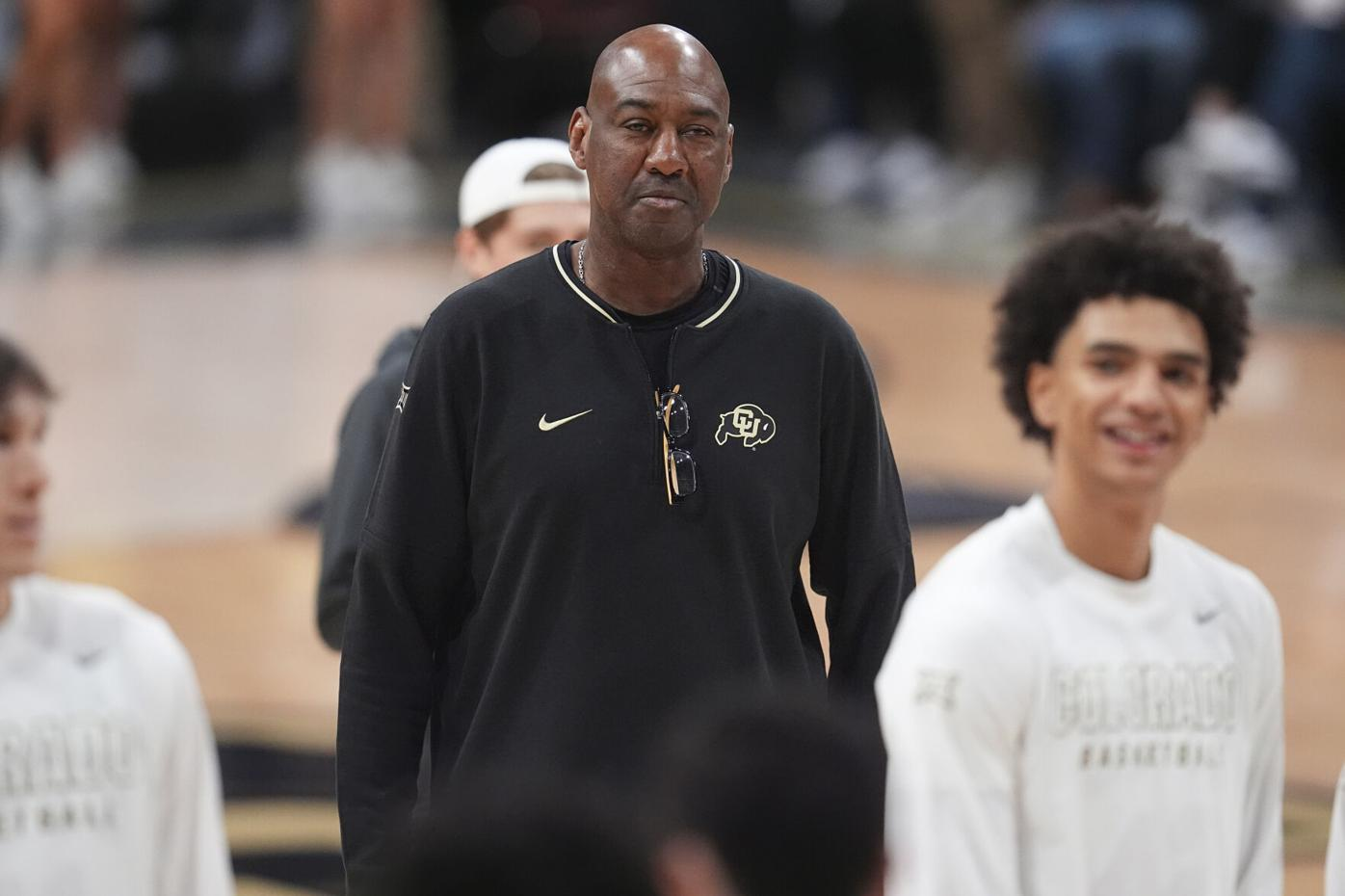
- Manning in 2025

Colorado Buffaloes
- Title: Assistant coach
- Conference: Big 12 Conference

Personal information
- Born: May 17, 1966 (age 60) Hattiesburg, Mississippi, U.S.
- Listed height: 6 ft 10 in (2.08 m)
- Listed weight: 234 lb (106 kg)

Career information
- High school: Page (Greensboro, North Carolina); Lawrence (Lawrence, Kansas)
- College: Kansas (1984–1988)
- NBA draft: 1988: 1st round, 1st overall pick
- Drafted by: Los Angeles Clippers
- Playing career: 1988–2003
- Position: Power forward
- Number: 25, 5, 15, 6
- Coaching career: 2006–present

Career history

Playing
- 1988–1994: Los Angeles Clippers
- 1994: Atlanta Hawks
- 1994–1999: Phoenix Suns
- 1999–2000: Milwaukee Bucks
- 2000–2001: Utah Jazz
- 2001–2002: Dallas Mavericks
- 2003: Detroit Pistons

Career highlights
- As player: 2× NBA All-Star (1993, 1994); NBA Sixth Man of the Year (1998); NCAA champion (1988); NCAA Final Four Most Outstanding Player (1988); National college player of the year (1988); 2× Consensus first-team All-American (1987, 1988); Consensus second-team All-American (1986); 3× Big Eight Player of the Year (1986–1988); No. 25 jersey retired by Kansas Jayhawks; USA Basketball Male Athlete of the Year (1987); First-team Parade All-American (1984); McDonald's All-American (1984); Mr. Kansas Basketball (1984); As head coach: C-USA regular season champion (2014); C-USA tournament champion (2014); C-USA Coach of the Year (2014); Skip Prosser Award (2017); As assistant coach: NCAA champion (2008)

Career NBA statistics
- Points: 12,367 (14.0 ppg)
- Rebounds: 4,615 (5.2 rpg)
- Assists: 2,063 (2.3 apg)
- Stats at NBA.com
- Stats at Basketball Reference
- Collegiate Basketball Hall of Fame
Medals
Men's basketball
Representing United States
Pan American Games
Silver medal – second place	1987 Indianapolis	National team
Olympic Games
Bronze medal – third place	1988 Seoul	National team
Assistant coach for United States
United States Under-18 National Team
FIBA U18 Championship
Gold medal – first place	2018 Canada	Team competition

Daniel Ricardo Manning (born May 17, 1966) is an American college basketball coach and former professional basketball player who is an assistant men's basketball coach at the University of Colorado. Manning played high-school basketball at Page High School in Greensboro, North Carolina, as well as Lawrence High School in Lawrence, Kansas. He played college basketball for the Kansas Jayhawks, and played in the National Basketball Association (NBA) for 14 years. After retiring from professional basketball Manning became an assistant coach at his alma mater, the University of Kansas. He won the national championship with the Jayhawks in 1988 as a player, and again as an assistant in 2008. He is the all-time leading scorer in Kansas basketball history with 2,951 points. The next closest player to his point total is Nick Collison, who is 854 points behind Manning.

== Early life ==
Manning is the son of Ed Manning, who was a longtime NBA and ABA player and professional and college coach.

As a junior at Page High School in Greensboro, North Carolina, Manning averaged 18.8 points and nine rebounds per game, leading the Pirates to a 26–0 record and the state title.

When Ed Manning became an assistant coach at the University of Kansas prior to Manning's senior year, the family moved to Lawrence, Kansas and Manning attended Lawrence High School, where as a senior he was named Kansas Player of the Year. While in Lawrence High, Manning was in the same high school class as Alibaba's Joe Tsai's wife - Clara Wu and played alongside future United States D.C. Circuit Judge Sri Srinivasan.

== College career ==
Manning led the Jayhawks to the 1988 NCAA title as a senior, leaving KU as its all-time leading scorer and rebounder. He was also the all-time leading scorer in Big Eight Conference history with 2,951 career points. He won the Wooden, Naismith, and NABC awards as the college player of the year in 1988.

In Kansas's 83–79 victory over Oklahoma in the 1988 NCAA Championship Game, Manning recorded 31 points, 18 rebounds, 5 steals, and 2 blocked shots. For his seemingly single-handed performance in propelling the underdog Jayhawks to the title, as well as KU's unremarkable record going into the NCAA tournament (21–11, most losses of any NCAA champion), the 1988 Kansas team was nicknamed "Danny and the Miracles" and Manning was honored as Most Outstanding Player in the tournament. A two-time All-American while at KU, Manning was later named the Big Eight Player of the Decade. Kansas retired his famous #25 in February 1992. He is the twelfth all-time leading scorer in NCAA Basketball history, behind Oscar Robertson.

Manning was selected to the last all-collegiate USA national basketball team in 1988, which competed at the Summer Olympics against all-professional Soviet and Yugoslavian teams in Seoul, South Korea. The team won the bronze medal but was viewed as a disappointment. Manning failed to score even a single point in that game, and afterward called it "one of the biggest disappointments of my life."

On April 2, 2020, The Sporting News deemed Manning the second-best player all-time since the NCAA bracket expanded.

== Professional career ==
Manning was drafted with the first overall pick by the Los Angeles Clippers in the 1988 NBA draft. He played only 26 games as a rookie after a torn anterior cruciate ligament required him to undergo arthroscopic knee surgery, but he returned for the 1989–1990 season. His most productive NBA season was 1992–1993, when he averaged 22.8 points a game for the Clippers and was selected to play in the All-Star Game. He also was selected as an All-Star the following season. On February 24, 1994, Manning was traded to the Atlanta Hawks for Dominique Wilkins and a first-round draft pick. In Los Angeles, he played for head coaches Gene Shue, Don Casey, Mike Schuler, Mack Calvin, Larry Brown and Bob Weiss. In Atlanta, he played for Lenny Wilkens.

He won the 1997–1998 Sixth Man Award, while playing for the Phoenix Suns, as the best reserve player in the NBA, averaging 13.5 points while playing about 26 minutes a game. Manning holds the distinction of being the first NBA player to have returned to play after reconstructive surgeries on both knees (a feat since duplicated by Kenyon Martin, Amar'e Stoudemire, Greg Oden and Derrick Rose). In Phoenix, he played for head coaches Paul Westphal, Cotton Fitzsimmons, Danny Ainge, and Scott Skiles.

Manning was traded to the Orlando Magic along with Pat Garrity and a conditional first-round draft pick for Penny Hardaway in 1999, and was subsequently traded to the Milwaukee Bucks with Dale Ellis in exchange for Armen Gilliam and Chris Gatling prior to the start of the 1999–2000 season. He played for George Karl. He spent the final three years of his career with the Utah Jazz, Dallas Mavericks, and Detroit Pistons. In Utah, he provided valuable scoring off the bench, as the Jazz were on the lookout for veteran role players to surround stars John Stockton and Karl Malone. He would average 7.4 points per game and 2.6 rebounds during the 2001 season as the Jazz qualified for the NBA Playoffs, where they faced a young and talented Dallas Mavericks team. He would average 10.6 points in the series. In 2001, Manning headed to Dallas to play for Hall of Fame coach Don Nelson. He finished his NBA career in Detroit (2003) playing for head coach Rick Carlisle.

== Coaching career ==
=== Assistant at Kansas ===
He announced his retirement from professional basketball in 2003 and served for four years at the University of Kansas as director of student-athlete development and team manager under KU basketball coach Bill Self. Manning was promoted to assistant coach at the end of the 2006–07 season as a replacement for Tim Jankovich who left the Kansas staff to take the position of head coach at Illinois State University. Manning became a key component of the Jayhawks coaching staff, filling vital roles in both recruiting and his work training the team's big men. In his role as KU assistant coach, Manning worked with the Jayhawk big men and earned a reputation as one of the best coaches of big men in the country. He coached 12 NBA draft picks, including eight first-round selections. Kansas bigs among those NBA draft picks during his tenure included Darrell Arthur, Darnell Jackson, Sasha Kaun, Cole Aldrich, twins Marcus Morris and Markieff Morris, Thomas Robinson and Jeff Withey. Manning recruited two McDonald's High School All-Americans, including the 2010 NBA first-round draft pick and Oklahoman Xavier Henry. He also coached two Academic All-Americans – Cole Aldrich and Tyrel Reed. Aldrich was selected as the 2010 Academic All-America of the Year for men's basketball. He spent a total of nine years on the staff at Kansas and was part of one NCAA national title, two Final Fours, five NCAA Elite Eight appearances, eight Big 12 regular-season conference titles, five Big 12 tournament championships, and 269 career victories.

=== Tulsa ===
On April 4, 2012, Manning was officially announced as Tulsa's head coach. In his first year, the Golden Hurricane posted a 17–16 overall record and an 8–8 mark in Conference USA play, finishing fifth in the league's regular season. With the fifth-least-experienced team in the nation in 2012–13 and battling injuries all season, TU advanced to the semifinals of the Conference USA Championship and played in the CBI postseason tournament. Two Hurricane players, James Woodard and D'Andre Wright, were selected to the C-USA All-Freshman Team. Tulsa improved their record to 21–13 in Manning's 2nd year, while going 13 – 3 in Conference play. Tulsa subsequently emerged as the C-USA regular-season leader and won the Conference tournament to advance onto an NCAA tournament berth for the first time since 2003. The Golden Hurricane lost in the second round to the UCLA Bruins 76–59. Manning was named the 2014 Conference USA Coach of the Year. He was also a finalist for two national Coach of the Year awards including the Jim Phelan Award and the Ben Jobe Award. Seven players moved on to play professional basketball once their careers concluded at Tulsa.

=== Wake Forest ===
On April 4, 2014, Manning agreed to become the head coach at Wake Forest University. He guided 14 players who went on to play professionally, including NBA players John Collins and Jaylen Hoard. Manning's work in player development was evident with Collins being the named the 2017 ACC Most Improved Player while Doral Moore in 2018 and Olivier Sarr in 2020 were runner-ups in the voting for the award. In the third season at WF, the team went 19–14 and reached the NCAA First Four, its first postseason appearance in seven seasons. Wake Forest ranked in the top 10 nationally in offensive efficiency, averaged 82.8 points per game, and set school records with 268 3-pointers and 77.8 percent from the free-throw line. The Deacs were led by All-American John Collins, who was selected by the Atlanta Hawks with the No. 19 overall selection of the NBA draft. Following the season, Manning received the Skip Prosser Man of the Year Award. His first season at the helm in 2014–15, a young Demon Deacon squad that had three freshmen among its top five scorers developed throughout the season despite a 13–19 record. Five of their wins came against teams that competed in the postseason, including a victory over eventual NCAA Sweet 16 squad NC State, while three of their losses were by single digits to teams ranked in the top-five nationally. The Demon Deacons went 11–20 during Manning's second season, highlighted by a third-place finish at the Maui Invitational. In 2017–18, the Deacs posted a pair of wins over Sweet 16 teams, downing Syracuse and Florida State and last year posted a win over a nationally ranked NC State squad. In 2019–20, the Demon Deacons posted wins over nationally ranked Xavier and Duke. 16 players made the dean's list and 29 players made 3.0 at some point during their career at WF. After going 78–111 in six seasons—only 1 winning record and never finishing better than 10th in the ACC—Manning was dismissed on April 25, 2020, from Wake Forest.

=== USA Basketball ===
In 2014, Manning served as a court coach at the 2014 USA Men's U18 National Team training camp with coaches Billy Donovan (Oklahoma City Thunder), Ed Cooley (Providence College) and Sean Miller (University of Arizona). The 2014 team won the gold medal. In 2017, he served with coaches John Calipari (Kentucky) and Tad Boyle (Colorado). The 2017 FIBA Under-19 Basketball World Cup was held in Cairo, Egypt, winning a bronze medal. In 2018, he served with Kansas head coach Bill Self, Dayton head coach Anthony Grant, won the U18 team, Gold Medal, competing in the 2018 FIBA Americas U18 Championship in St. Catharines, Ontario.

=== Maryland ===
In 2021, Manning joined the coaching staff of his former Kansas teammate Mark Turgeon at Maryland. After Turgeon stepped down as head coach on December 2, 2021, Manning was named Interim Head Coach. Maryland finished the season 15–17 with seven quad 1 & 2 wins, four top 25 wins after playing 18 games vs teams in the 2022 NCAA Tournament. Maryland finished first in the Big Ten in both free throws made (456) and free throw percentage (.760), while ranking third in free throws attempted (600). The Terrapins were 13–1 when leading with 5:00 minutes to play, with its one loss of the season coming at No. 3 Purdue. They were also 10–4 when out-rebounding their opponent on the season.

=== Louisville ===
Manning was hired as Associate Head Basketball Coach at the University of Louisville on April 15, 2022. The team finished with only four wins and the worst season in modern history of Louisville men's basketball.

=== Colorado ===
On May 7, 2024, Manning was hired as an assistant coach at the University of Colorado.

== Other work ==
Manning served as a color commentator for Westwood One's radio coverage of the 2021 NCAA tournament.

== Head coaching record ==
Record table
Season	Team	Overall	Conference	Standing	Postseason
Tulsa Golden Hurricane (Conference USA) (2012–2014)
2012–13	Tulsa	17–16	8–8	6th	CBI First Round
2013–14	Tulsa	21–13	13–3	T–1st	NCAA Division I Round of 64
Tulsa:		38–29 (.567)	21–11 (.656)		
Wake Forest Demon Deacons (Atlantic Coast Conference) (2014–2020)
2014–15	Wake Forest	13–19	5–13	12th	
2015–16	Wake Forest	11–20	2–16	13th	
2016–17	Wake Forest	19–14	9–9	10th	NCAA Division I First Four
2017–18	Wake Forest	11–20	4–14	14th	
2018–19	Wake Forest	11–20	4–14	13th	
2019–20	Wake Forest	13–18	6–14	T–13th	
Wake Forest:		78–111 (.413)	30–80 (.273)		
Maryland Terrapins (Big Ten Conference) (2021–2022)
2021–22*	Maryland	10–14	7–13	T–10th	
Maryland:		10–14 (.417)	7–13 (.350)		
Total:		126–154 (.450)			
National champion Postseason invitational champion Conference regular season champion Conference regular season and conference tournament champion Division regular season champion Division regular season and conference tournament champion Conference tournament champion

*Interim HC

== Philanthropy ==
Manning has been involved with and served with the Special Olympics, NBA Retired Players Association, Advocates for Athletic Equity (AAE) (formerly Black Coaches Association), National Association of Basketball Coaches (NABC), National Basketball Players Association (NBPA), Screen Actors Guild - American Federation of Television and Radio Artists, Boys & Girls Club, Kansas Governors Council on Fitness, Lawrence Community Shelter, NBA Read to Achieve Program, Sunflower State Games/Grand Canyon State Games, Grand Canyon State Games as well as numerous youth camps across the country.

== Personal life ==
Manning is the son of former NBA player, Ed Manning. Manning's own son, Evan, was a walk-on for the men's basketball team at Kansas where he played for four seasons and was a graduate assistant at Gonzaga, later an assistant coach at Army West Point, and is currently Director of Basketball Operations at the University of Arizona, while his daughter, Taylor, was a member of the Kansas volleyball team. Manning was inducted into NCAA Basketball Hall of Fame on November 23, 2008. In addition to his NCAA basketball Hall of Fame enshrinement, in June 2008 Manning was enshrined in the Guilford County Sports Hall of Fame for his early high school career at Page High School in North Carolina. He is also a member of the Lawrence High School Hall of Fame.

== NBA career statistics ==
Legend
GP	Games played	GS	Games started	MPG	Minutes per game
FG%	Field goal percentage	3P%	3-point field goal percentage	FT%	Free throw percentage
RPG	Rebounds per game	APG	Assists per game	SPG	Steals per game
BPG	Blocks per game	PPG	Points per game	**Bold**	Career high
*	Led the league

=== Regular season ===
Year	Team	GP	GS	MPG	FG%	3P%	FT%	RPG	APG	SPG	BPG	PPG
1988–89	L.A. Clippers	26	18	36.5	.494	.200	.767	6.6	3.1	1.7	1.0	16.7
1989–90	L.A. Clippers	71	42	32.0	.533	.000	.741	5.9	2.6	1.3	0.5	16.3
1990–91	L.A. Clippers	73	47	30.1	.519	.000	.716	5.8	2.7	1.6	0.8	15.9
1991–92	L.A. Clippers	**82**	**82**	35.4	.542	.000	.725	6.9	3.5	1.6	**1.5**	19.3
1992–93	L.A. Clippers	79	77	34.9	.509	.267	.802	6.6	2.6	1.4	1.3	22.8
1993–94	L.A. Clippers	42	41	**38.0**	.493	.143	.674	**7.0**	**4.2**	1.3	1.4	**23.7**
1993–94	Atlanta	26	25	35.6	.476	.333	.651	6.5	3.3	**1.8**	1.0	15.7
1994–95	Phoenix	46	19	32.8	**.547**	.286	.673	6.0	3.3	0.9	1.2	17.9
1995–96	Phoenix	33	4	24.7	.459	.214	.752	4.3	2.0	1.2	0.7	13.4
1996–97	Phoenix	77	17	27.7	.536	.194	.721	6.1	2.2	1.1	1.0	13.5
1997–98	Phoenix	70	11	25.6	.516	.000	.739	5.6	2.0	1.0	0.7	13.5
1998–99	Phoenix	50*	5	23.7	.484	.111	.696	4.4	2.3	0.7	0.8	9.1
1999–00	Milwaukee	72	0	16.9	.440	.250	.654	2.9	1.0	.9	0.4	4.6
2000–01	Utah	**82**	0	15.9	.494	.250	.729	2.6	1.1	0.6	0.4	7.4
2001–02	Dallas	41	10	13.5	.477	.143	.667	2.6	.7	.5	0.5	4.0
2002–03	Detroit	13	0	6.8	.406	**.375**	**.833**	1.4	.5	0.7	0.2	2.6
Career		883	398	27.4	.511	.206	.729	5.2	2.3	1.1	0.9	14.0
All-Star		2	0	17.5	.750	—	—	4.0	1.5	.0	.5	9.0

=== Playoffs ===
Year	Team	GP	GS	MPG	FG%	3P%	FT%	RPG	APG	SPG	BPG	PPG
1992	L.A. Clippers	5	5	**38.8**	.568	.333	.645	5.6	2.8	1.0	.8	**22.6**
1993	L.A. Clippers	5	5	34.2	.412	.000	.808	**7.2**	1.6	**1.4**	1.0	18.2
1994	Atlanta	**11**	**11**	38.7	.488	—	.788	7.0	**3.4**	**1.4**	.8	20.0
1996	Phoenix	4	0	22.5	.458	.000	.625	2.8	1.3	1.0	.3	12.3
1997	Phoenix	5	0	23.2	.578	.000	**.933**	6.0	1.4	.8	**1.4**	13.2
1999	Phoenix	3	1	26.3	**.583**	—	.769	1.7	2.0	1.3	.0	12.7
2000	Milwaukee	1	0	5.0	.000	—	—	1.0	.0	.0	.0	.0
2001	Utah	5	0	19.2	.559	**1.000**	.750	2.2	.6	.6	.8	9.8
2003	Detroit	4	0	3.5	.333	.000	—	.8	.0	.0	.3	.5
Career		43	22	27.7	.501	.250	.766	4.7	1.9	1.0	.7	14.6

== See also ==
- List of NCAA Division I men's basketball players with 2000 points and 1000 rebounds
- List of second-generation National Basketball Association players
