= 1987–88 Big East Conference men's basketball season =

American college basketball season

1987–88 Big East Conference Men's Basketball Season
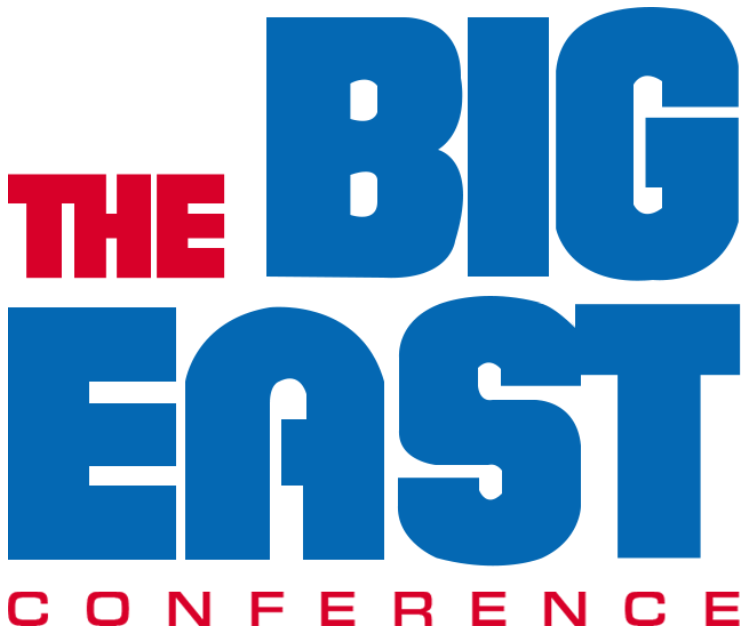
- League: NCAA Division I
- Sport: Basketball
- Duration: November 20, 1987 through March 13, 1988
- Teams: 9
- TV partner: ESPN

Regular Season
- Champion: Pittsburgh (12–4)
- Season MVP: Charles Smith – Pittsburgh

Tournament
- Champions: Syracuse
- Finals MVP: Sherman Douglas – Syracuse

Basketball seasons
- 1986–87 1988–89

1987–88 Big East men's basketball standings
	Conf.				Overall
Team	W		L	PCT	W		L	PCT
No. 8 Pittsburgh	12	–	4	.750	24	–	7	.774
No. 9 Syracuse†	11	–	5	.688	26	–	9	.743
Georgetown	9	–	7	.563	20	–	10	.667
Villanova	9	–	7	.563	24	–	13	.649
St. John's	8	–	8	.500	17	–	12	.586
Seton Hall	8	–	8	.500	22	–	13	.629
Boston College	6	–	10	.375	18	–	15	.545
Providence	5	–	11	.313	11	–	17	.393
Connecticut	4	–	12	.250	20	–	14	.588
† 1988 Big East tournament winner As of April 4, 1988; Rankings from AP Poll

The 1987–88 Big East Conference men's basketball season was the ninth in conference history, and involved its nine full-time member schools.

Pittsburgh was the regular-season champion with a record of 12–4. Syracuse won the Big East tournament championship.

Connecticut won the 1988 National Invitation Tournament.

== Season summary & highlights ==
- Pittsburgh was the regular-season champion with a record of (12–4). It was Pittsburgh's second regular-season championship or co-championship.
- Syracuse won its second Big East tournament championship.
- Connecticut won the 1988 National Invitation Tournament. It was the first of two consecutive NIT championships for Big East schools: St. John's won the 1989 NIT the following season.
- Connecticut junior guard Phil Gamble was named Most Valuable Player of the 1988 NIT.

== Head coaches ==
School	Coach	Season	Notes
Boston College	Jim O'Brien	2nd	
Connecticut	Jim Calhoun	2nd	
Georgetown	John Thompson, Jr.	16th	
Pittsburgh	Paul Evans	2nd	
Providence	Gordon Chiesa	1st	Resigned March 21, 1988
St. John's	Lou Carnesecca	18th	
Seton Hall	P. J. Carlesimo	6th	Big East Coach of the Year
Syracuse	Jim Boeheim	12th	
Villanova	Rollie Massimino	13th	

== Rankings ==
Syracuse was ranked No. 1 preseason, Pittsburgh and Syracuse were ranked in the Top 20 of the Associated Press poll for the entire season, and Pittsburgh was in the Top 10 in all but one week. Georgetown was in the Top 20 for most of the season until fading late in the year. St. John's and Villanova also made brief appearances in the Top 20.

1987–88 Big East Conference Weekly Rankings Key: ██ Increase in ranking. ██ Decrease in ranking.
AP Poll	Pre	11/30	12/7	12/14	12/21	12/28	1/4	1/11	1/18	1/25	2/1	2/8	2/15	2/22	2/29	3/7	Final
Boston College																	
Connecticut																	
Georgetown	16	17	14	18	19	18	14	11	15	15	14		18				
Pittsburgh	4	4	2	3	3	3	2	6	6	11	9	5	8	6	7	5	8
Providence																	
St. John's							20				20						
Seton Hall																	
Syracuse	1	3	8	9	7	7	7	9	14	17	12	11	12	10	12	13	9
Villanova										19		20					

== Regular-season statistical leaders ==
Scoring
Name	School	PPG
Dana Barros	BC	21.9
Mark Bryant	SHU	20.5
Charles Smith	Pitt	18.9
Shelton Jones	SJU	18.6
Cliff Robinson	Conn	17.6

Rebounding
Name	School	RPG
Jerome Lane	Pitt	12.2
Derrick Coleman	Syr	11.0
Rony Seikaly	Syr	9.6
Mark Bryant	SHU	9.1
Shelton Jones	SJU	8.8

Assists
Name	School	APG
Sherman Douglas	Syr	8.2
Sean Miller	Pitt	5.8
Tate George	Conn	5.6
Kenny Wilson	Vill	4.9
Boo Harvey	SJU	4.9

Steals
Name	School	SPG
Eric Murdock	Prov	3.2
Delray Brooks	Prov	2.8
Charles Smith	GU	2.4
John Morton	SHU	2.1
Sherman Douglas	Syr	2.0

Blocks
Name	School	BPG
Charles Smith	Pitt	3.1
Rony Seikaly	Syr	2.4
Tom Greis	Vill	2.4
Steve Wright	Prov	1.6
Derrick Coleman	Syr	1.6

Field Goals
Name	School	FG%
Shelton Jones	SJU	.596
Derrick Coleman	Syr	.587
Tom Greis	Vill	.582
Rony Seikaly	Syr	.568
Mark Bryant	SHU	.564

3-Pt Field Goals
Name	School	3FG%
Dana Barros	BC	.454
(no other qualifiers)

Free Throws
Name	School	FT%
Kenny Wilson	Vill	.866
Delray Brooks	Prov	.854
Dana Barros	BC	.850
John Morton	SHU	.841
Tate George	Conn	.831

== Postseason ==
=== Big East tournament ===
==== Seeding ====
Seeding in the Big East tournament was based on conference record, with tiebreakers applied as necessary. The eighth- and ninth-seeded teams played a first-round game, and the other seven teams received a bye into the quarterfinals.

The tournament's seeding was as follows: (1) Pittsburgh, (2) Syracuse, (3) Georgetown, (4) Villanova, (5) St. John's, (6) Seton Hall, (7) Boston College, (8) Providence, (9) Connecticut.

==== Bracket ====
First round March 10, 1988
8	Providence	62
9	Connecticut	75

Quarterfinals; March 11, 1988
1	#5 Pittsburgh	75
9	Connecticut	58
4	Villanova	71
5	St. John's	68
3	Georgetown	58
6	Seton Hall	61
2	#13 Syracuse	67
7	Boston College	53

Semifinals; March 12, 1988
1	#5 Pittsburgh	69
4	Villanova	72
6	Seton Hall	63
2	#13 Syracuse	68

Championship game March 13, 1988
4	Villanova	68
2	#13 Syracuse	85

=== NCAA tournament ===
Six Big East teams received bids to the NCAA Tournament. St. John's lost in the first round and Georgetown, Pittsburgh, Seton Hall, and Syracuse in the second round. Villanova finished as the Southeast Region runner-up.

School	Region	Seed	Round 1	Round 2	Sweet 16	Elite 8
Villanova	Southeast	6	11 Arkansas, W 82–74	3 Illinois, W 66–63	2 Kentucky, W 80–74	1 Oklahoma, L 78–59
Pittsburgh	Midwest	2	15 Eastern Michigan, W 93–68	7 Vanderbilt, L 80–74^{(OT)}		
Syracuse	East	3	14 North Carolina A&T, W 69–55	11 Rhode Island, L 97–94		
Georgetown	East	8	9 LSU, W 66–63	1 Temple, L 74–53		
Seton Hall	West	8	9 UTEP, W 80–64	1 Arizona, L 84–55		
St. John's	Midwest	11	6 Florida, L 62–59			

=== National Invitation Tournament ===
Two Big East teams received bids to the National Invitation Tournament, which did not yet have seeding. Playing in two different unnamed brackets, Boston College and Connecticut both advanced to the semifinals, in which Connecticut defeated Boston College. Connecticut then went on to defeat Ohio State for the 1988 NIT championship. Connecticut junior guard Phil Gamble was named Most Valuable Player of the 1988 NIT.

School	Round 1	Round 2	Quarterfinals	Semifinals	Final
Connecticut	West Virginia, W 62–57	Louisiana Tech, W 65–59	VCU, W 69–60	Boston College, W 73–67	Ohio State, W 69–60
Boston College	Siena, W 73–68	Evansville, W 88–81	Middle Tennessee State, W 78–69	Connecticut, L 73–67	

== Awards and honors ==
=== Big East Conference ===
Player of the Year:

- Charles Smith, Pittsburgh, F, Sr.

Defensive Player of the Year:

- Gary Massey, Villanova, G, Jr.

Freshman of the Year:

- Sean Miller, Pittsburgh, G

Coach of the Year:

- P. J. Carlesimo, Seton Hall (6th season)

All-Big East First Team

- Dana Barros, Boston College, G, Jr., 5 ft 11 in (180 cm), 163 lb (74 kg), Boston, Mass.
- Charles Smith, Pittsburgh, F, Sr., 6 ft 10 in (208 cm), 250 lb (113 kg), Bridgeport, Conn.
- Mark Bryant, Seton Hall, F, Sr., 6 ft 9 in (206 cm), 245 lb (111 kg), Glen Ridge, N.J.
- Derrick Coleman, Syracuse, F, So., 6 ft 10 in (208 cm), 258 lb (117 kg), Mobile, Ala.
- Sherman Douglas, Syracuse, G, Jr., 6 ft 0 in (183 cm), 180 lb (82 kg), Washington, D.C.

All-Big East Second Team:

- Charles Smith, Georgetown, G, Jr., 6 ft 1 in (185 cm), 160 lb (73 kg), Washington, D.C.
- Jerome Lane, Pittsburgh, F, Jr., 6 ft 6 in (198 cm), 230 lb (104 kg), Akron, Ohio
- Shelton Jones, St. John's, F, Sr., 6 ft 9 in (206 cm), 210 lb (95 kg), Copiague, N.Y.
- Rony Seikaly, Syracuse, C, Sr. 6 ft 10 in (208 cm), 240 lb (109 kg), Athens, Greece
- Doug West, Villanova, G, Jr. 6 ft 6 in (198 cm), 200 lb (91 kg), Altoona, Pa.

All-Big East Third Team:

- Cliff Robinson, Connecticut, C, Jr., 6 ft 10 in (208 cm), 245 lb (111 kg), Portland, Ore.
- Steve Wright, Providence, C, Sr. 6 ft 9 in (206 cm), 209 lb (95 kg), Syracuse, N.Y.
- Michael Porter, St. John's, G, Jr., 6 ft 0 in (183 cm), Alexandria, Va.
- Mark Plansky, Villanova, F, Sr., 6 ft 6 in (198 cm), 210 lb (95 kg), Wakefield, Mass.
- Tom Greis, Villanova, C, So., 7 ft 5 in (226 cm), 236 lb (107 kg), Queens, N.Y.

Big East All-Freshman Team:

- Corey Beasley, Boston College, F, 6 ft 9 in (206 cm), 210 lb (95 kg)
- Bobby Martin, Pittsburgh, C, 6 ft 9 in (206 cm), Atlantic City, N.J.
- Jason Matthews, Pittsburgh, G, 6 ft 3 in (191 cm)
- Sean Miller, Pittsburgh, G, 6 ft 1 in (185 cm), Ellwood City, Pa.
- Eric Murdock, Providence, G, 6 ft 1 in (185 cm), 190 lb (86 kg), Somerville, N.J.

=== All-Americans ===
The following players were selected to the 1988 Associated Press All-America teams.

Consensus All-America Second Team:

- Jerome Lane, Pittsburgh, Key Stats: 13.9 ppg, 12.2 rpg, 2.8 apg, 51.3 FG%, 431 points
- Rony Seikaly, Syracuse, Key Stats: 16.3 ppg, 9.5 rpg, 2.4 bpg, 56.6 FG%, 569 points

Second Team All-America:

- Jerome Lane, Pittsburgh, Key Stats: 13.9 ppg, 12.2 rpg, 2.8 apg, 51.3 FG%, 431 points

Third Team All-America:

- Sherman Douglas, Pittsburgh, Key Stats: 18.2 ppg, 2.4 rpg, 8.6 apg, 54.6 FG%, 36.8 3P%, 562 points

AP Honorable Mention

- Dana Barros, Boston College
- Derrick Coleman, Syreacuse
- Charles Smith, Pittsburgh

== See also ==
- 1987–88 NCAA Division I men's basketball season
- 1987–88 Connecticut Huskies men's basketball team
- 1987–88 Georgetown Hoyas men's basketball team
- 1987–88 St. John's Redmen basketball team
- 1987–88 Seton Hall Pirates men's basketball team
- 1987–88 Syracuse Orangemen basketball team
- 1987–88 Villanova Wildcats men's basketball team
