= 1988 Big East men's basketball tournament =

- Classification: Division I
- Season: 1987–88
- Teams: 9
- Site: Madison Square Garden; New York City
- Champions: Syracuse (2nd title)
- Winning coach: Jim Boeheim (2nd title)
- MVP: Sherman Douglas (Syracuse)
- Television: Big East Network – first round, quarterfinals and semi-finals (Pittsburgh–Villanova); CBS – semi-finals (Syracuse–Seton Hall) and championship game

1987–88 Big East men's basketball standings
	Conf.				Overall
Team	W		L	PCT	W		L	PCT
No. 8 Pittsburgh	12	–	4	.750	24	–	7	.774
No. 9 Syracuse†	11	–	5	.688	26	–	9	.743
Georgetown	9	–	7	.563	20	–	10	.667
Villanova	9	–	7	.563	24	–	13	.649
St. John's	8	–	8	.500	17	–	12	.586
Seton Hall	8	–	8	.500	22	–	13	.629
Boston College	6	–	10	.375	18	–	15	.545
Providence	5	–	11	.313	11	–	17	.393
Connecticut	4	–	12	.250	20	–	14	.588
† 1988 Big East tournament winner As of April 4, 1988; Rankings from AP Poll

The 1988 Big East men's basketball tournament took place at Madison Square Garden in New York City, from March 10 to March 13, 1988. Its winner received the Big East Conference's automatic bid to the 1988 NCAA tournament. It is a single-elimination tournament with four rounds. Pittsburgh had the best regular season conference record and received the #1 seed.

Syracuse defeated Villanova in the championship game 85–68, to claim its second Big East tournament championship.

== Bracket ==
First round March 10, 1988
8	Providence	62
9	Connecticut	75

Quarterfinals; March 11, 1988
1	#5 Pittsburgh	75
9	Connecticut	58
4	Villanova	71
5	St. John's	68
3	Georgetown	58
6	Seton Hall	61
2	#13 Syracuse	67
7	Boston College	53

Semifinals; March 12, 1988
1	#5 Pittsburgh	69
4	Villanova	72
6	Seton Hall	63
2	#13 Syracuse	68

Championship game March 13, 1988
4	Villanova	68
2	#13 Syracuse	85

=== Game summaries ===
==== First round ====
Big East Network

Thursday, March 10
7:00 pm

#8 Providence Friars 62, #9 Connecticut Huskies 75
Scoring by half: 27–31, 35–44

Madison Square Garden - New York, NY
Attendance: 19,591
Referees: Joe Mingle, David Day, Bob Donato

==== Quarterfinals ====
Big East Network

Friday, March 11
7:00 pm

#1 Pittsburgh Panthers 75, #9 Connecticut Huskies 58
Scoring by half: 33–32, 42–26

Madison Square Garden - New York, NY
Attendance: 19,591
Referees: Jim Burr, Mickey Crowley, Joe Mingle

== Awards ==
Most Valuable Player: Sherman Douglas, Syracuse

All Tournament Team

- Sherman Douglas, Syracuse
- Jerome Lane, Pittsburgh
- Mark Plansky, Villanova
- Ramón Ramos, Seton Hall
- Stephen Thompson, Syracuse
- Doug West, Villanova
