= Plansky =

Plansky is a surname. Notable people with the surname include:

- Mark Plansky (born 1966), American basketball player
- Tony Plansky (1900–1979), American football player
