= 1988 MEAC men's basketball tournament =

- Classification: Division I
- Season: 1987–88
- Teams: 7
- Site: Greensboro Coliseum; Greensboro, North Carolina
- Champions: North Carolina A&T (13th title)
- Winning coach: Don Corbett (7th title)
- MVP: Claude Williams (North Carolina A&T)

1987–88 MEAC men's basketball standings
	Conf.				Overall
Team	W		L	PCT	W		L	PCT
North Carolina A&T †	16	–	0	1.000	26	–	3	.897
Florida A&M	11	–	5	.688	22	–	8	.733
South Carolina State	10	–	6	.625	16	–	13	.552
Howard	9	–	7	.563	15	–	12	.556
Coppin State	8	–	7	.533	13	–	14	.481
Morgan State	7	–	8	.467	13	–	17	.433
Maryland Eastern Shore	5	–	11	.313	7	–	20	.259
Bethune–Cookman	4	–	12	.250	6	–	21	.222
Delaware State	1	–	15	.063	3	–	25	.107
† 1988 MEAC tournament winner Rankings from AP Poll

The 1988 Mid-Eastern Athletic Conference men's basketball tournament took place March 3–5, 1988, at Greensboro Coliseum in Greensboro, North Carolina. North Carolina A&T defeated Florida A&M, 101–86 in the championship game, to win its seventh consecutive MEAC Tournament title.

The Aggies earned an automatic bid to the 1988 NCAA tournament as a No. 14 seed in the East region.

== Format ==
Seven of nine conference members participated, with play beginning in the quarterfinal round. Teams were seeded based on their regular season conference record.

== Bracket ==
Quarterfinals; March 3
4	Howard	65
5	Morgan State	59
3	South Carolina State	88
6	Maryland Eastern Shore	77
2	Florida A&M	104
7	Delaware State	73

Semifinals; March 4
1	North Carolina A&T	67
4	Howard	62
3	South Carolina State	65
2	Florida A&M	73

Final; March 5
1	North Carolina A&T	101
2	Florida A&M	86
