= 1987–88 Villanova Wildcats men's basketball team =

American college basketball season

1987–88 Villanova Wildcats men's basketball

NCAA tournament, Elite Eight
- Conference: Big East Conference
- Record: 24–13 (9–7 Big East)
- Head coach: Rollie Massimino (15th season)
- Assistant coach: Jay Wright (1st season)
- Home arena: John Eleuthère du Pont Pavilion (Capacity: 6,500)

1987–88 Big East men's basketball standings
| | Conf. | | | | Overall |
| Team | W | | L | PCT | W | | L | PCT |
|---|---|---|---|---|---|---|---|---|
| No. 8 Pittsburgh | 12 | – | 4 | .750 | 24 | – | 7 | .774 |
| No. 9 Syracuse† | 11 | – | 5 | .688 | 26 | – | 9 | .743 |
| Georgetown | 9 | – | 7 | .563 | 20 | – | 10 | .667 |
| Villanova | 9 | – | 7 | .563 | 24 | – | 13 | .649 |
| St. John's | 8 | – | 8 | .500 | 17 | – | 12 | .586 |
| Seton Hall | 8 | – | 8 | .500 | 22 | – | 13 | .629 |
| Boston College | 6 | – | 10 | .375 | 18 | – | 15 | .545 |
| Providence | 5 | – | 11 | .313 | 11 | – | 17 | .393 |
| Connecticut | 4 | – | 12 | .250 | 20 | – | 14 | .588 |
† 1988 Big East tournament winner As of April 4, 1988; Rankings from AP Poll

The 1987–88 Villanova Wildcats men's basketball team represented Villanova University in the 1987–88 season. The head coach was Rollie Massimino. The team played its home games at The Pavilion in Villanova, Pennsylvania, and was a member of the Big East Conference.

== Roster ==
1987–88 Villanova Wildcats men's basketball team
Players
Coaches

| Pos. | # | Name | Height | Weight | Year | Hometown |
|---|---|---|---|---|---|---|
| F | 34 | Barry Bekkedam | 6 ft 10 in (2.08 m) | — | So |
| G | 4 | Greg Downs | — | — | Fr |
| G | 10 | Pat Enright | 5 ft 10 in (1.78 m) | — | Jr |
| C | 33 | Tom Greis | 7 ft 5 in (2.26 m) | — | So |
| G | 44 | Eric Leslie | 6 ft 3 in (1.91 m) | — | So |
| G | 21 | Chris Masotti | 5 ft 11 in (1.8 m) | — | Fr |
| G | 22 | Gary Massey | 6 ft 6 in (1.98 m) | — | Jr |
| G | 32 | Tim Muller | 6 ft 2 in (1.88 m) | — | Fr |
| F | 31 | Mark Plansky | 6 ft 7 in (2.01 m) | — | Sr |
| F | 35 | Rodney Taylor | 6 ft 6 in (1.98 m) | — | So |
| G | 12 | Rob Tribuiani | — | — | Fr |
| G | 42 | Doug West | 6 ft 6 in (1.98 m) | 200 lb (91 kg) | Jr |
| G | 3 | Kenny Wilson | 5 ft 9 in (1.75 m) | — | Jr |

Head coach

- Rollie Massimino (Vermont)

Assistant coach(es)

Legend

- (C) Team captain
- (S) Suspended
- (I) Ineligible
- (W) Walk-on
- Injured
- Current redshirt

== Schedule ==
| Date time, TV | Rank^{#} | Opponent^{#} | Result | Record | Site city, state |
Non-conference regular season
| November 27, 1987* | | vs. Nebraska; Hawaiian Airlines Maui Classic Quarterfinal | W 70–53 | 1–0 | Lahania Civic Center (1,200); Lahaina, Hawaii |
| November 28, 1987* | | vs. Illinois; Hawaiian Airlines Maui Classic Semifinal | W 78–76 | 2–0 | Lahania Civic Center (1,200); Lahaina, Hawaii |
| November 29, 1987* | | vs. No. 11 Iowa; Hawaiian Airlines Maui Classic Championship | L 74–97 | 2–1 | Lahania Civic Center (3,200); Lahaina, Hawaii |
| December 2, 1987*; PRISM | | Penn; Big 5 | W 84–55 | 3–1 | John Eleuthère du Pont Pavilion (6,222); Villanova, Pennsylvania |
| December 6, 1987* | | California | W 65–50 | 4–1 | John Eleuthère du Pont Pavilion (6,500); Villanova, Pennsylvania |
Big East Conference regular season
| December 8, 1987; Big East TV | | Connecticut | W 63–61 | 5–1 (1–0) | John Eleuthère du Pont Pavilion (6,500); Villanova, Pennsylvania |
Non-conference regular season
| December 12, 1987*; PRISM | | St. Joseph's; Big 5 | L 52–53 | 5–2 | John Eleuthère du Pont Pavilion (6,500); Villanova, Pennsylvania |
| December 18, 1987*; PRISM | | at La Salle; Big 5/Jostens Philadelphia Classic Semifinal | W 83–80 | 6–2 | The Palestra (8,144); Philadelphia, Pennsylvania |
| December 19, 1987* | | vs. Wake Forest; Jostens Philadelphia Classic Championship | W 83–70 | 7–2 | The Palestra (5,114); Philadelphia, Pennsylvania |
| December 29, 1987* | | vs. Auburn; Cotton State Kiwanis Classic Semifinal | L 64–65 | 7–3 | The Omni (11,033); Atlanta, Georgia |
| December 30, 1987* | | vs. William & Mary; Cotton State Kiwanis Classic Consolation | W 76–57 | 8–3 | The Omni (13,111); Atlanta, Georgia |
| January 2, 1988* | | Virginia | W 63–54 | 9–3 | John Eleuthère du Pont Pavilion (6,500); Villanova, Pennsylvania |
Big East Conference regular season
| January 4, 1988; ESPN | | at St. John's | W 69–62 | 10–3 (2–0) | Alumni Hall (6,008); Jamaica, New York |
| January 9, 1988; Big East TV | | Boston College | W 66–54 | 11–3 (3–0) | John Eleuthère du Pont Pavilion (6,500); Villanova, Pennsylvania |
| January 11, 1988; ESPN | | No. 7 Syracuse | W 80–78 | 12–3 (4–0) | The Spectrum (16,284); Philadelphia, Pennsylvania |
| January 16, 1988; Big East TV | | at No. 6 Pittsburgh | L 73–85 | 12–4 (4–1) | Fitzgerald Field House (6,798); Pittsburgh, Pennsylvania |
| January 20, 1988; Big East TV | | at Connecticut | W 69–58 | 13–4 (5–1) | Hartford Civic Center (13,077); Hartford, Connecticut |
| January 23, 1988; Big East TV | | Seton Hall | W 69–63 | 14–4 (6–1) | John Eleuthère du Pont Pavilion (6,500); Villanova, Pennsylvania |
| January 27, 1988; ESPN | No. 19 | St. John's | L 55–60 | 14–5 (6–2) | John Eleuthère du Pont Pavilion (6,500); Villanova, Pennsylvania |
| January 30, 1988; Big East TV | | Providence | L 76–82 | 14–6 (6–3) | Providence Civic Center (13,041); Providence, Rhode Island |
| February 1, 1988; ESPN | | No. 15 Georgetown | W 64–58 | 15–6 (7–3) | The Spectrum (18,059); Philadelphia, Pennsylvania |
| February 6, 1988; Big East TV | | at Boston College | W 66–54 | 16–6 (8–3) | Boston Garden (7,427); Boston, Massachusetts |
Non-conference regular season
| February 10, 1988*; PRISM | No. 20 | at No. 1 Temple; Big 5 | L 86–98 | 16–7 | McGonigle Hall (4,500); Philadelphia, Pennsylvania |
Big East Conference regular season
| February 13, 1988; Big East TV | No. 20 | No. 5 Pittsburgh | L 75–87 | 16–8 (8–4) | John Eleuthère du Pont Pavilion (6,500); Villanova, Pennsylvania |
| February 15, 1988; ESPN | | at Georgetown | L 54–56 | 16–9 (6–5) | Capital Centre (11,816); Landover, Maryland |
| February 20, 1988; Big East TV | | Providence | W 96–68 | 17–9 (9–5) | John Eleuthère du Pont Pavilion (6,500); Villanova, Pennsylvania |
Non-conference regular season
| February 22, 1988* | | Drexel; City 6 | W 90–73 | 18–9 | John Eleuthère du Pont Pavilion (6,500); Villanova, Pennsylvania |
Big East Conference regular season
| February 27, 1988; Big East TV | | at Seton Hall | L 58–84 | 18–10 (9–6) | Meadowlands Arena (13,101); East Rutherford, New Jersey |
| March 1, 1988; Big East TV | | at No. 12 Syracuse | L 69–71 | 18–11 (9–7) | Carrier Dome (30,139); Syracuse, New York |
Non-conference regular season
| March 3, 1988* | | at Vermont | W 92–62 | 19–11 | Patrick Gym (1,893); Burlington, Vermont |
Big East tournament
| March 11, 1988*; Big East TV | (4) | vs. (5) St. John's; Big East tournament Quarterfinal | W 71–68 | 20–11 | Madison Square Garden (19,591); New York City, New York |
| March 12, 1988*; Big East TV | (4) | vs. (1) No. 5 Pittsburgh; Big East tournament Semifinal | W 72–69 | 21–11 | Madison Square Garden (19,591); New York City, New York |
| March 13, 1988*; CBS | (4) | vs. (2) No. 13 Syracuse; Big East tournament championship | L 68–85 | 21–12 | Madison Square Garden (19,591); New York City, New York |
NCAA tournament
| March 18, 1988*; ESPN; NCAA Productions | (6 SE) | vs. (11 SE) Arkansas; NCAA tournament first round | W 82–74 | 22–12 | Riverfront Coliseum (16,562); Cincinnati, Ohio |
| March 20, 1988*; CBS | (6 SE) | vs. (3 SE) No. 16 Illinois; NCAA tournament second round | W 66–63 | 23–12 | Riverfront Coliseum (16,562); Cincinnati, Ohio |
| March 24, 1988*; CBS | (6 SE) | vs. (2 SE) No. 6 Kentucky; NCAA Tournament Sweet Sixteen | W 80–74 | 24–12 | BJCC Coliseum (16,816); Birmingham, Alabama |
| March 26, 1988*; CBS | (6 SE) | vs. (1 SE) No. 4 Oklahoma; NCAA Tournament Elite Eight | L 59–78 | 24–13 | BJCC Coliseum (16,816); Birmingham, Alabama |
*Non-conference game. ^{#}Rankings from AP Poll. (#) Tournament seedings in parentheses. SE=Southeast.

== Awards and honors ==
- Doug West, 2nd Team All-Big East
- Doug West, 1st Team All-Big East tournament
- Doug West, NCAA Tournament All-Southeast Region
- Mark Plansky, 3rd Team All-Big East
- Mark Plansky, 1st Team All-Big East tournament
- Tom Greis, 3rd Team All-Big East
- Kenny Wilson, NCAA Tournament All-Southeast Region
- Gary Massey, Big East Defensive Player of the Year

== Team players drafted into the NBA ==
| Year | Round | Pick | Player | NBA club |
|---|---|---|---|---|
| 1989 | 2 | 38 | Doug West | Minnesota Timberwolves |
