= 1987–88 Pittsburgh Panthers men's basketball team =

American college basketball season

1987–88 Pittsburgh Panthers men's basketball

Big East Regular Season Champions

NCAA tournament, second round, L 74–80 vs. Vanderbilt
- Conference: Big East Conference (1979–2013)

Ranking
- Coaches: No. 8
- AP: No. 8
- Record: 24–7 (12–4 Big East)
- Head coach: Paul Evans (2nd season)
- Assistant coaches: Norm Law (2nd season); Mark Coleman (2nd season); John Calipari (3rd season)
- Home arena: Fitzgerald Field House (Capacity: 4,122)

1987–88 Big East men's basketball standings
	Conf.				Overall
Team	W		L	PCT	W		L	PCT
No. 8 Pittsburgh	12	–	4	.750	24	–	7	.774
No. 9 Syracuse†	11	–	5	.688	26	–	9	.743
Georgetown	9	–	7	.563	20	–	10	.667
Villanova	9	–	7	.563	24	–	13	.649
St. John's	8	–	8	.500	17	–	12	.586
Seton Hall	8	–	8	.500	22	–	13	.629
Boston College	6	–	10	.375	18	–	15	.545
Providence	5	–	11	.313	11	–	17	.393
Connecticut	4	–	12	.250	20	–	14	.588
† 1988 Big East tournament winner As of April 4, 1988; Rankings from AP Poll

The 1987–88 Pittsburgh Panthers men's basketball team represented the University of Pittsburgh in the 1987–88 NCAA Division I men's basketball season. Led by head coach Paul Evans, the Panthers finished with a record of 24–7. They received an at-large bid to the 1988 NCAA Division I men's basketball tournament where, as a #2 seed, they lost in overtime in the second round to Vanderbilt.

== Schedule ==
Date time, TV	Rank^{#}	Opponent^{#}	Result	Record	Site city, state
Non-conference regular season
Nov 28, 1987*	No. 4	Robert Morris	W 96–70	1–0	Fitzgerald Field House; Pittsburgh, Pennsylvania
Dec 2, 1987*	No. 4	Saint Francis (PA)	W 88–70	2–0	Fitzgerald Field House; Pittsburgh, Pennsylvania
Dec 7, 1987*	No. 2	Chicago State	W 89–63	3–0	Fitzgerald Field House; Pittsburgh, Pennsylvania
December 12, 1987*	No. 2	at West Virginia	W 70–64	4–0	WVU Coliseum; Morgantown, West Virginia
December 21, 1987*	No. 3	vs. Akron	W 67–63	5–0	Richfield Coliseum; Richfield, Ohio
Dec 26, 1987*	No. 3	at Jacksonville	W 81–67	6–0	Jacksonville Memorial Coliseum; Jacksonville, Florida
Dec 28, 1987*	No. 3	vs. Florida State	W 72–71	7–0	Orange County Civic Center; Orlando, Florida
Dec 29, 1987*	No. 3	vs. Alabama	W 87–51	8–0	Orange County Civic Center; Orlando, Florida
January 2, 1988*; CBS	No. 3	No. 8 Florida	W 80-68	9-0	Fitzgerald Field House; Pittsburgh, Pennsylvania
Big East regular season
January 6, 1988; ESPN	No. 2	at No. 14 Georgetown	L 57–62	9–1 (0–1)	Capital Centre (13,970); Landover, Maryland
January 9, 1988; Big East TV	No. 2	No. 20 St. John's	W 81–70	10–1 (1–1)	Fitzgerald Field House; Pittsburgh, Pennsylvania
Non-conference regular season
January 11, 1988*	No. 6	Duquesne	W 85–58	11–1	Fitzgerald Field House; Pittsburgh, Pennsylvania
Big East regular season
January 13, 1988; Big East TV	No. 6	Connecticut	W 61–58	12–1 (2–1)	Fitzgerald Field House; Pittsburgh, Pennsylvania
January 16, 1988; Big East TV	No. 6	Villanova	W 85–73	13–1 (3–1)	Fitzgerald Field House (6,798); Pittsburgh, Pennsylvania
Non-conference regular season
January 23, 1988*; CBS	No. 6	at No. 11 Oklahoma	L 83–86	13–2	Lloyd Noble Center; Norman, Oklahoma
Big East regular season
January 25, 1988; ESPN	No. 11	Providence	W 90–56	14–2 (4–1)	Fitzgerald Field House; Pittsburgh, Pennsylvania
January 30, 1988; Big East TV	No. 11	at Boston College	W 73–67	15–2 (5–1)	Boston Garden; Boston, Massachusetts
February 3, 1988; ESPN	No. 9	at No. 20 St. John's	W 88–71	16–2 (6–1)	Alumni Hall; Jamaica, New York
February 10, 1988; ESPN	No. 5	No. 11 Syracuse	L 75–84	16–3 (6–2)	Civic Arena (16,798); Pittsburgh, Pennsylvania
February 13, 1988; Big East TV	No. 5	at No. 20 Villanova	W 87–75	17–3 (7–2)	John Eleuthère du Pont Pavilion (6,500); Villanova, Pennsylvania
February 16, 1988; Big East TV	No. 8	at Providence	W 87–86	18–3 (8–2)	Providence Civic Center; Providence, Rhode Island
February 20, 1988; CBS	No. 8	No. 18 Georgetown	W 64–58	19–3 (9–2)	Civic Arena (16,721); Pittsburgh, Pennsylvania
February 22, 1988; ESPN	No. 6	at Seton Hall	L 72–89	19–4 (9–3)	Meadowlands Arena; East Rutherford, New Jersey
February 27, 1988; Big East TV	No. 6	at Connecticut	W 74–69	20–4 (10–3)	Hartford Civic Center; Hartford, Connecticut
March 1, 1988; Big East TV	No. 7	Boston College	W 87–79	21–4 (11–3)	Fitzgerald Field House; Pittsburgh, Pennsylvania
March 2, 1988	No. 7	Seton Hall	L 79–83	21–5 (11–4)	Fitzgerald Field House; Pittsburgh, Pennsylvania
March 6, 1988; CBS	No. 7	at No. 12 Syracuse	W 85–84	22–5 (12–4)	Carrier Dome (32,492); Syracuse, New York
Big East tournament
March 11, 1988*; Big East TV	(1) No. 5	vs. (9) Connecticut; Big East tournament Quarterfinal	W 75–58	23–5	Madison Square Garden (19,591); New York City, New York
March 12, 1988*; Big East TV	(1) No. 5	vs. (4) Villanova; Big East tournament semifinal	L 69–72	23–6	Madison Square Garden (19,591); New York City, New York
NCAA tournament
March 18, 1988*; ESPN; NCAA Productions	(2 MW) No. 8	vs. (15 MW) Eastern Michigan; NCAA tournament first round	W 108–90	24–6	Bob Devaney Sports Center (14,375); Lincoln, Nebraska
March 20, 1988*; CBS	(2 MW) No. 8	vs. (7 MW) Vanderbilt; NCAA Tournament second round	L 74–80 ^{OT}	24–7	Bob Devaney Sports Center (14,433); Lincoln, Nebraska
*Non-conference game. ^{#}Rankings from AP Poll. (#) Tournament seedings in parentheses. MW=Midwest.
