= 1987–88 North Carolina A&T Aggies men's basketball team =

American college basketball season

1987–88 North Carolina A&T Aggies men's basketball

MEAC regular season champions MEAC tournament champions

NCAA tournament, First Round
- Conference: Mid-Eastern Athletic Conference
- Record: 26–3 (16–0 MEAC)
- Head coach: Don Corbett (9th season)
- Home arena: Corbett Sports Center

1987–88 MEAC men's basketball standings
	Conf.				Overall
Team	W		L	PCT	W		L	PCT
North Carolina A&T †	16	–	0	1.000	26	–	3	.897
Florida A&M	11	–	5	.688	22	–	8	.733
South Carolina State	10	–	6	.625	16	–	13	.552
Howard	9	–	7	.563	15	–	12	.556
Coppin State	8	–	7	.533	13	–	14	.481
Morgan State	7	–	8	.467	13	–	17	.433
Maryland Eastern Shore	5	–	11	.313	7	–	20	.259
Bethune–Cookman	4	–	12	.250	6	–	21	.222
Delaware State	1	–	15	.063	3	–	25	.107
† 1988 MEAC tournament winner Rankings from AP Poll

The 1987–88 North Carolina A&T Aggies men's basketball team represented North Carolina Agricultural and Technical State University during the 1987–88 NCAA Division I men's basketball season. The Aggies, led by 9th-year head coach Don Corbett, played their home games at the Corbett Sports Center as members of the Mid-Eastern Athletic Conference. They finished the season 26–3, 16–0 in MEAC play to finish in first place by 5 games. They were champions of the MEAC tournament, winning the championship game over Florida A&M, to earn an automatic bid to the 1988 NCAA tournament – the school's 7th straight appearance in the NCAA Tournament – where they were defeated by No. 3 seed Syracuse, 69–55, in the opening round.

== Roster ==
1987–88 North Carolina A&T Aggies men's basketball team
Players	Coaches
Pos. / # / Name / Height / Weight / Year / Hometown; F / / Claude Williams / 6 ft 7 in (2.01 m) / — / Sr	Head coach: Don Corbett; Assistant coach(es) Legend: (C) Team captain; (S) Suspended; (I) Ineligible; (W) Walk-on; Injured; Current redshirt

== Schedule and results ==
Date time, TV	Rank^{#}	Opponent^{#}	Result	Record	Site (attendance) city, state
Regular season
Dec 2, 1987*		at Detroit Mercy	W 82–70	1–0	Calihan Hall (1,276); Detroit, Michigan
Dec 5, 1987*		Western Carolina	W 97–73	2–0	Corbett Sports Center (4,500); Greensboro, North Carolina
Dec, 1987*		vs. Winston-Salem State	W 65–58	3–0	Memorial Coliseum (5,500); Winston-Salem, North Carolina
Dec, 1987*		Johnson C. Smith	W 83–67	4–0	Corbett Sports Center (5,500); Greensboro, North Carolina
Dec 19, 1987*		at Virginia Union	W 89–75	5–0	(924); Richmond, Virginia
Jan 2, 1988*		at Akron	L 57–63	5–1	James A. Rhodes Arena (3,442); Akron, Ohio
Jan 4, 1988		at Coppin State	W 90–61	6–1 (1–0)	Coppin Center (1,500); Baltimore, Maryland
Jan 9, 1988		at Howard	W 70–66	7–1 (2–0)	Burr Gymnasium (2,500); Washington, D.C.
Jan 11, 1988		at Morgan State	W 72–62	8–1 (3–0)	Talmadge L. Hill Field House (550); Baltimore, Maryland
Jan 14, 1988*		at Western Carolina	W 83–69	9–1	Ramsey Center (1,687); Cullowhee, North Carolina
Jan 16, 1988		Bethune-Cookman	W 78–69	10–1 (4–0)	Corbett Sports Center (4,500); Greensboro, North Carolina
Jan 19, 1988*		at Georgia Tech	L 72–84	10–2	Alexander Memorial Coliseum (5,063); Atlanta, Georgia
Jan 23, 1988		at Bethune-Cookman	W 69–57	11–2 (5–0)	Moore Gymnasium (1,700); Daytona Beach, Florida
Jan 25, 1988		at Florida A&M	W 89–86 ^{OT}	12–2 (6–0)	Jake Gaither Gymnasium (3,532); Tallahassee, Florida
Jan 30, 1988		at Delaware State	W 94–61	13–2 (7–0)	Memorial Hall (1,700); Dover, Delaware
Feb 1, 1988		at Maryland-Eastern Shore	W 83–64	14–2 (8–0)	J. Millard Tawes Gymnasium (1,500); Princess Anne, Maryland
Feb 3, 1988		Akron	W 92–70	15–2 (9–0)	Corbett Sports Center (4,200); Greensboro, North Carolina
Feb 6, 1988		Maryland-Eastern Shore	W 91–82	16–2 (10–0)	Corbett Sports Center (2,500); Greensboro, North Carolina
Feb 8, 1988		Delaware State	W 93–60	17–2 (11–0)	Corbett Sports Center (3,300); Greensboro, North Carolina
Feb, 1988*		Winston-Salem State	W 60–57	18–2	Corbett Sports Center (7,300); Greensboro, North Carolina
Feb 13, 1988		at South Carolina State	W 74–64	19–2 (12–0)	SHM Memorial Center (2,629); Orangeburg, South Carolina
Feb 15, 1988		Florida A&M	W 88–78	20–2 (13–0)	Corbett Sports Center (4,100); Greensboro, North Carolina
Feb 17, 1988		Coppin State	W 102–70	21–2 (14–0)	Corbett Sports Center (2,200); Greensboro, North Carolina
Feb 20, 1988		Howard	W 93–70	22–2 (15–0)	Corbett Sports Center (7,800); Greensboro, North Carolina
Feb 22, 1988		Morgan State	W 78–60	23–2 (16–0)	Corbett Sports Center (2,500); Greensboro, North Carolina
Feb 27, 1988		South Carolina State	W 92–55	24–2 (17–0)	Corbett Sports Center (6,817); Greensboro, North Carolina
1988 MEAC tournament
Mar 4, 1988*		Howard; Semifinals	W 67–62	25–2	Greensboro Coliseum (5,154); Greensboro, North Carolina
Mar 5, 1988*		Florida A&M; Championship game	W 101–86	26–2	Greensboro Coliseum (8,800); Greensboro, North Carolina
1988 NCAA tournament
Mar 17, 1988*	(14 E)	vs. (3 E) No. 9 Syracuse; First Round	L 55–69	26–3	Dean Smith Center (14,617); Chapel Hill, North Carolina
*Non-conference game. ^{#}Rankings from AP poll. (#) Tournament seedings in parentheses. SE=Southeast. All times are in Eastern Time.

== Awards and honors ==
- Claude Williams – MEAC Player of the Year
