= 1987–88 Seton Hall Pirates men's basketball team =

American college basketball season

1987–88 Seton Hall Pirates men's basketball

NCAA tournament, second round
- Conference: Big East Conference
- Record: 22–13 (8–8 Big East)
- Head coach: P. J. Carlesimo (6th season)
- Home arena: Walsh Gymnasium; Brendan Byrne Arena

1987–88 Big East men's basketball standings
	Conf.				Overall
Team	W		L	PCT	W		L	PCT
No. 8 Pittsburgh	12	–	4	.750	24	–	7	.774
No. 9 Syracuse†	11	–	5	.688	26	–	9	.743
Georgetown	9	–	7	.563	20	–	10	.667
Villanova	9	–	7	.563	24	–	13	.649
St. John's	8	–	8	.500	17	–	12	.586
Seton Hall	8	–	8	.500	22	–	13	.629
Boston College	6	–	10	.375	18	–	15	.545
Providence	5	–	11	.313	11	–	17	.393
Connecticut	4	–	12	.250	20	–	14	.588
† 1988 Big East tournament winner As of April 4, 1988; Rankings from AP Poll

The 1987–88 Seton Hall Pirates men's basketball team represented Seton Hall University during the 1987–88 NCAA men's college basketball season. The Pirates were led by sixth year head coach P.J. Carlesimo.

== Roster ==
1987–88 Seton Hall Pirates men's basketball team
Players
Coaches

Pos.	#	Name	Height	Weight	Year	Previous school	Hometown
F	00	Mark Bryant	6 ft 9 in (2.06 m)	235 lb (107 kg)	Sr	Columbia High School
F	31	Mike Cooper	6 ft 5 in (1.96 m)	—	So
PG	15	Gerald Greene	6 ft 1 in (1.85 m)	—	Jr
F	52	Nick Katsikis	6 ft 5 in (1.96 m)	—	So
F	20	Khyiem Long	6 ft 7 in (2.01 m)	—	Jr
G		James Major	5 ft 11 in (1.8 m)	—	Sr
G	23	John Morton	6 ft 3 in (1.91 m)	180 lb (82 kg)	Jr	Walton High School	Bronx, New York
F/C	25	Ramón Ramos	6 ft 8 in (2.03 m)	231 lb (105 kg)	Jr		Canóvanas, Puerto Rico
G	14	Jose Rebimbas	6 ft 0 in (1.83 m)	—	So
F	13	Martin Salley	6 ft 4 in (1.93 m)	—	Sr
G		Quinn Smith	6 ft 0 in (1.83 m)	—	Fr
F	30	Frantz Volcy	6 ft 8 in (2.03 m)	—	So
F	24	Daryll Walker	6 ft 8 in (2.03 m)	—	Jr
G	4	Pookey Wigington	5 ft 4 in (1.63 m)	—	Jr		Inglewood, California

Head coach

- P. J. Carlesimo

Assistant coach(es)

Legend

- (C) Team captain
- (S) Suspended
- (I) Ineligible
- (W) Walk-on
- Injured
- Current redshirt

Roster

== Schedule and results ==
Date time, TV	Rank^{#}	Opponent^{#}	Result	Record	Site (attendance) city, state
Regular Season
Nov 20, 1987*		vs. George Mason; Preseason Big Apple NIT	W 85–63	1–0	Rutgers Athletic Center
Nov 24, 1987*		vs. Middle Tennessee; Preseason Big Apple NIT	W 93–61	2–0	Rutgers Athletic Center
Nov 27, 1987*		vs. New Mexico; Preseason Big Apple NIT	W 88–67	3–0	Madison Square Garden; New York, NY
Nov 28, 1987*		vs. No. 14 Florida; Preseason Big Apple NIT	L 68–70	3–1	Madison Square Garden; New York, NY
Dec 1, 1987*		Bridgeport	W 104–83	4–1	Walsh Gymnasium; East Rutherford, NJ
Dec 5, 1987*		Wagner	W 93–52	5–1	Walsh Gymnasium; East Rutherford, NJ
Dec 6, 1987*		Lafayette	W 98–73	6–1	Walsh Gymnasium; East Rutherford, NJ
Dec 9, 1987*		Iona	W 92–84	7–1	Walsh Gymnasium; East Rutherford, NJ
Dec 12, 1987*		Rutgers	W 92–72	8–1	Brendan Byrne Arena; East Rutherford, NJ
Dec 15, 1987*		at Princeton	L 59–61	8–2	Jadwin Gymnasium; Princeton, NJ
Dec 19, 1987*		Fordham	W 80–63	9–2	Walsh Gymnasium; East Rutherford, NJ
Dec 22, 1987*		Holy Cross	W 98–76	10–2	Walsh Gymnasium; East Rutherford, NJ
Dec 29, 1987*		vs. Pacific; Cable Car Classic	W 104–78	11–2	Leavey Center; Santa Clara, CA
Dec 30, 1987*		at Santa Clara; Cable Car Classic	L 75–91	11–3	Leavey Center; Santa Clara, CA
Jan 5, 1988		Connecticut	W 71–58	12–3 (1–0)	Brendan Byrne Arena; East Rutherford, NJ
Jan 9, 1988		at No. 7 Syracuse	L 82–84	12–4 (1–1)	Carrier Dome; Syracuse, NY
Jan 12, 1988		at Boston College	L 70–85	12–5 (1–2)	Roberts Center; Boston, MA
Jan 16, 1988		at St. John's	L 70–71	12–6 (1–3)	Madison Square Garden; New York, NY
Jan 19, 1988		Providence	W 82–80	13–6 (2–3)	Brendan Byrne Arena; East Rutherford, NJ
Jan 23, 1988		at Villanova	L 63–69	13–7 (2–4)	John Eleuthère du Pont Pavilion; Villanova, PA
Jan 27, 1988		No. 17 Syracuse	L 76–87	13–8 (2–5)	Brendan Byrne Arena; East Rutherford, NJ
Jan 30, 1988		St. John's	L 55–58	13–9 (2–6)	Brendan Byrne Arena; East Rutherford, NJ
Feb 2, 1988		at Connecticut	W 61–59	14–9 (3–6)	Hartford Civic Center; Hartford, CT
Feb 6, 1988		at Providence	W 68–54	15–9 (4–6)	Providence Civic Center; Providence, RI
Feb 9, 1988		Georgetown	L 60–66	15–10 (4–7)	Brendan Byrne Arena; East Rutherford, NJ
Feb 16, 1988*		vs. Saint Peter's	W 79–70	16–10	Brendan Byrne Arena; East Rutherford, NJ
Feb 20, 1988		Boston College	W 89–83	17–10 (5–7)	Brendan Byrne Arena; East Rutherford, NJ
Feb 22, 1988		No. 8 Pittsburgh	W 89–72	18–10 (6–7)	Brendan Byrne Arena; East Rutherford, NJ
Feb 27, 1988		Villanova	W 84–58	19–10 (7–7)	Brendan Byrne Arena; East Rutherford, NJ
Mar 2, 1988		at No. 7 Pittsburgh	W 83–79	20–10 (8–7)	Fitzgerald Field House; Pittsburgh, PA
Mar 5, 1988		at Georgetown	L 98–102	20–11 (8–8)	Capital Centre; Landover, MD
Big East Tournament
Mar 11, 1988*	(6)	vs. (3) Georgetown; Big East Tournament Quarterfinal	W 61–58	21–11	Madison Square Garden; New York, NY
Mar 12, 1988*	(6)	vs. (2) No. 13 Syracuse; Big East Tournament Semifinal	L 63–68	21–12	Madison Square Garden; New York, NY
NCAA Tournament
Mar 18, 1988*	(8 W)	vs. (9 W) UTEP; First Round	W 80–64	22–12	Pauley Pavilion; Los Angeles, CA
Mar 20, 1988*	(8 W)	vs. (1 W) No. 2 Arizona; Second Round	L 55–84	22–13	Pauley Pavilion; Los Angeles, CA
*Non-conference game. ^{#}Rankings from AP Poll. (#) Tournament seedings in parentheses. W=West.

== Awards and honors ==
- P. J. Carlesimo – Big East Coach of the Year
- Mark Bryant – Haggerty Award, First-team All-Big East
