= 1988 National Invitation Tournament =

Basketball competition

- Season: 1987–88
- Teams: 32
- Finals site: Madison Square Garden, New York City
- Champions: Connecticut Huskies (1st title)
- Runner-up: Ohio State Buckeyes (2nd title game)
- Semifinalists: Colorado State Rams (1st semifinal); Boston College Eagles (3rd semifinal)
- Winning coach: Jim Calhoun (1st title)
- MVP: Phil Gamble (Connecticut)

The 1988 National Invitation Tournament was the 1988 edition of the annual NCAA college basketball competition.

== Selected teams ==
Below is a list of the 32 teams selected for the tournament.

- Arkansas–Little Rock
- Arkansas State
- Boston College
- Clemson
- Cleveland State
- Colorado State
- Connecticut
- Evansville
- Fordham
- Georgia
- Georgia Southern
- Houston
- Illinois State
- Long Beach State
- Louisiana Tech
- Marshall
- Middle Tennessee State
- New Mexico
- New Orleans
- Northeast Louisiana
- Ohio State
- Old Dominion
- Oregon
- Pepperdine
- Santa Clara
- Siena
- Southern Miss
- Stanford
- Tennessee
- Utah
- VCU
- West Virginia

== Bracket ==
Below are the four first round brackets, along with the four-team championship bracket.

First Round
Evansville	66
Utah	55
Boston College	73
Siena	65
Georgia	53
Georgia Southern	48
Middle Tennessee State	85
Tennessee	80

Second Round
Evansville	81
Boston College	88
Georgia	54
Middle Tennessee State	69

Quarterfinals
Boston College	78
Middle Tennessee State	69

First Round
Connecticut	62
West Virginia	57
Louisiana Tech	66
Arkansas–Little Rock	56
VCU	81
Marshall	80
Southern Miss	74
Clemson	69

Second Round
Connecticut	65
Louisiana Tech	59
VCU	93
Southern Miss	89

Quarterfinals
Connecticut	69
VCU	60

First Round
Ohio State	86
Old Dominion	73
Cleveland State	89
Illinois State	83
New Mexico	86
Pepperdine	75
Oregon	81
Santa Clara	65

Second Round
Ohio State	86
Cleveland State	80
New Mexico	78
Oregon	59

Quarterfinals
Ohio State	68
New Mexico	65

First Round
Colorado State	63
New Orleans	54
Houston	69
Fordham	61
Stanford	80
Long Beach State	77
Arkansas State	70
Northeast Louisiana	54

Second Round
Colorado State	71
Houston	61
Stanford	59
Arkansas State	60

Quarterfinals
Colorado State	69
Arkansas State	49

=== Semifinals & finals ===
Semifinals
Boston College	67
Connecticut	73
Ohio State	64
Colorado State	62

Finals
Connecticut	72
Ohio State	67

Third place game
Boston College	57
Colorado State	58

== See also ==
- 1988 National Women's Invitational Tournament
- 1988 NCAA Division I men's basketball tournament
- 1988 NCAA Division II men's basketball tournament
- 1988 NCAA Division III men's basketball tournament
- 1988 NCAA Division I women's basketball tournament
- 1988 NCAA Division II women's basketball tournament
- 1988 NCAA Division III women's basketball tournament
- 1988 NAIA men's basketball tournament
- 1988 NAIA women's basketball tournament
