= 1987–88 Georgetown Hoyas men's basketball team =

American college basketball season

1987–88 Georgetown Hoyas men's basketball

NCAA tournament, second round
- Conference: Big East Conference
- Record: 20–10 (9–7 Big East)
- Head coach: John Thompson (16th season)
- Assistant coaches: Craig Esherick (6th season); Mike Riley (6th season)
- Captains: Ronnie Highsmith; Perry McDonald
- Home arena: Capital Centre

1987–88 Big East men's basketball standings
	Conf.				Overall
Team	W		L	PCT	W		L	PCT
No. 8 Pittsburgh	12	–	4	.750	24	–	7	.774
No. 9 Syracuse†	11	–	5	.688	26	–	9	.743
Georgetown	9	–	7	.563	20	–	10	.667
Villanova	9	–	7	.563	24	–	13	.649
St. John's	8	–	8	.500	17	–	12	.586
Seton Hall	8	–	8	.500	22	–	13	.629
Boston College	6	–	10	.375	18	–	15	.545
Providence	5	–	11	.313	11	–	17	.393
Connecticut	4	–	12	.250	20	–	14	.588
† 1988 Big East tournament winner As of April 4, 1988; Rankings from AP Poll

The 1987–88 Georgetown Hoyas men's basketball team represented Georgetown University in the 1987–88 NCAA Division I college basketball season. John Thompson, coached them in his 16th season as head coach. They played their home games at the Capital Centre in Landover, Maryland. They were members of the Big East Conference and finished the season with a record of 20–10, 9–7 in Big East play. Their record earned them a bye in the first round of the 1988 Big East men's basketball tournament, but they lost to Seton Hall in the quarterfinals. They advanced to the second round of the 1988 NCAA Division I men's basketball tournament before losing to Temple.

== Season recap ==
Sophomore guard Mark Tillmon had shot only 39% from the field the previous season, but he improved to 47% this year and became the second Georgetown player to shoot 40% or better from three-point range since the institution of the three-point shot the previous year. He was the team's top scorer in three non-conference and six Big East games. Sophomore guard Dwayne Bryant, meanwhile, led the team in assists but otherwise had a difficult season, starting only 16 games, shooting only 37% from the field, and scoring in double figures only twice. He would, however, make a remarkable comeback the next season.

After spending his freshman and sophomore years as a reserve shooting guard with only modest success, senior and team co-captain Perry McDonald had moved to forward during his junior season and emerged as one of Georgetown's top scoring threats, rebounders, and defenders. When he returned from playing on a gold-medal United States team at the World University Games in the summer of 1987, it seemed to observers that he was poised to be the major driver of Georgetown's 1987-88 offense. However, Thompson chose to emphasize the offensive play of Georgetown' guards on this season's team, and McDonald's playing time fell by 10 percent. Despite this, he led the team in scoring six times and in rebounding 16 times. For the season, he averaged 10.1 points per game despite taking 70 fewer shots than the year before, and he also averaged 6.3 rebounds per game.

Junior forward Jaren Jackson also had spent his first two years strictly as a reserve. This year, after an 0-for-9 effort from the field against Hawaii Loa in the season's opening game, he recovered to score in double figures five times during December 1987. He then returned to limited duty as a reserve, starting only six games all season. His breakout game would not come until the very end of the regular season.

Like McDonald and Jackson, guard Charles Smith had spent his first two years as an unheralded reserve, seeing only two starts in his first 63 games, but had suddenly and dramatically emerged at the end of the previous season as a potent offensive force in Georgetown's defeat of Ohio State in the second round of the 1987 NCAA Division I men's basketball tournament. After touring Australia with a Big East all-star team during the summer of 1987, leading that team in points, assists, and steals, he returned for his junior year with a transformed career, appearing in all 30 games and starting 16 of them, with 75 assists and 71 steals and averaging 15.7 points per game. In the first nine games of the season, he scored in double figures six times. After the Hoyas fell behind at Miami in the tenth game, Smith led the Hoyas in a comeback win in which he shot 8-for-12 from the field and scored 22 points. It began a 34-game streak across two seasons in which he scored in double figures in every Georgetown game for the next year and nine days.

As January 1988 wore on, Smith scored 20 points at DePaul and 21 at Boston College. On January 24 at Syracuse, Georgetown had come back from a nine-point deficit to take the lead, with Tillmon scoring 19 points and grabbing seven rebounds, when Syracuse guard Sherman Douglas scored a basket with nine seconds left in the game to give the Orangemen a 68-67 lead. Georgetown had no time-outs left and no time to set up a play, so with eight seconds remaining the 6-foot-0 (183-cm) Smith single-handedly took the ball from the backcourt, through the entire Syracuse defense, and to the basket, scoring the winning field goal with a finger roll to give the Hoyas a last-second 69-68 upset victory over the 14th-ranked Orangemen. In February, Smith had a 28-point performance at Seton Hall, and four days later the Hoyas pulled out another last-second upset win over now-11th-ranked Syracuse, beating the Orangemen 71-69 at the Capital Centre.

The Big East had developed a reputation for strong rivalries, physical play, and, increasingly, fighting. On January 6, 1988, Pittsburgh and Georgetown met at the Capital Centre and the 14th-ranked Hoyas upset the No. 2 Panthers. During the game, a fight broke out between Tillmon and Pittsburgh's Nate Bailey, a benches-clearing brawl followed, and the teams came away from the incident bearing grudges against each other. On February 20, 1988, the Hoyas again met Pittsburgh, this time at the Civic Arena in Pittsburgh, Pennsylvania. With four seconds remaining in the game and the Panthers leading 70-65, Perry McDonald and Pittsburgh's Jerome Lane became entangled with one another while fighting for a rebound under the basket, and McDonald's elbow struck Lane. Lane responded with a roundhouse right, and McDonald – a two-time Gold Glove boxing champion in Louisiana – retaliated. Fights immediately also broke out between Hoya sophomore center Sam Jefferson and Pittsburgh senior forward Demetreus Gore and between Georgetown junior forward Johnathan Edwards and Panthers senior forward Charles Smith (not to be confused with Georgetown's Charles Smith), and another benches-clearing brawl ensued. Angry Pittsburgh fans came onto the floor, Thompson pulled the Hoyas off the court, and the game did not continue. Postgame, Thompson had to separate the teams when the fight almost resumed in the hallway between the opposing locker rooms. The ugly incident, coming on the heels of the fight at the Capital Centre the previous month, prompted Big East Commissioner Dave Gavitt to convene a committee to recommend measures to reduce fighting and other unsportsmanlike behavior in the conference. Sportswriters and opposing fans accused Georgetown players of being thugs, and Thompson took to the media to defend the team, saying that the fights were not entirely Georgetown's fault.

The Hoyas closed out the regular season with a double-overtime 102-98 win against Seton Hall in which Tillmon scored 35 points and pulled down eight rebounds. Jaren Jackson finally had his breakout game that afternoon; after nearly three seasons of limited play and limited scoring, he shot 12-for-17 (70.6%) from the field and 11-for-12 (91.7%) from the free-throw line to score a career-high 38 points. This final victory in regular-season conference play gave the Hoyas a 9-7 record and third-place finish in Big East play. They received a bye in the first round of the 1988 Big East men's basketball tournament, but they lost their first game of the tournament to Seton Hall in the quarterfinals.

The Hoyas were the No. 8 seed in the East Region of the 1988 NCAA Division I men's basketball tournament – the 10th of 14 consecutive Georgetown NCAA tournament appearances. In the first round, they faced the No. 9 seed, Louisiana State. Jackson continued his sudden emergence as one of Georgetown's top offensive threats, scoring 20 points. With the game tied 63–63 with three seconds left to play, Charles Smith got the inbounds pass after a Georgetown timeout and, unable to find an open teammate, put up a 30-foot (9.1-meter) shot that scored to give Georgetown a 66–63 last-second win. The win allowed the Hoyas to advance to the second round, in which the East Region's No. 1 seed and eventual champion, No. 1-ranked Temple, defeated them 74–53 in a game in which Jaren Jackson scored 13 points. Jackson's offensive surge in the final games of the year raised his average for the season to 8.7 points per game and changed his career, placing him in a position to excel the following season.

By the mid-1908s, brawls like those between Pittsburgh and Georgetown in the winter of 1988 had become an increasing problem in National Collegiate Athletic Association (NCAA) men's basketball games, with few consequences because of a lack of rules governing consequences for fighting. During the 1988 off-season, the NCAA established Rule 19, which mandated a one-game suspension for any player involved in an on-court fight and a season-long suspension for any player fighting a second time during the year. With Rule 19 – later renumbered as Rule 10.7 – in force, brawls have become rare.

== Roster ==
#	Name	Height	Weight (lbs.)	Position	Class	Hometown	Previous Team(s)
4	Bobby Winston	6'5"	N/A	G/F	Jr.	Washington, DC, U.S.	All Saints HS
10	Perry MacDonald	6'4"	190	F	Sr.	New Orleans, LA, U.S.	George Washington Carver Senior HS
12	Dwayne Bryant	6'2"	190	G	So.	New Orleans, LA, U.S.	De La Salle HS
13	Charles Smith	6'0"	160	G	Jr.	Washington, DC, U.S.	All Saints HS
20	Mark Tillmon	6'2"	190	G	So.	Washington, DC, U.S.	Gonzaga College HS
21	Jaren Jackson	6'2"	190	F	Jr.	New Orleans, LA, U.S.	Walter L. Cohen HS
22	Johnny Jones	6'6"	N/A	F	Jr.	Coral Springs, FL, U.S.	University of the District of Columbia
24	Anthony Allen	6'7"	N/A	F	So.	Port Arthur, TX, U.S.	Abraham Lincoln HS
40	Tom Lang	6'0"	N/A	G	Sr.	Gaithersburg, Maryland, U.S.	Thomas Sprigg Wootton HS
41	Anthony Tucker	6'7"	N/A	F	Fr.	Washington, DC, U.S.	McKinley Technology HS
42	Johnathan Edwards	6'8"	N/A	F	Jr.	New Orleans, LA, U.S.	O. Perry Walker HS
44	Ronnie Highsmith	6'8"	N/A	F	Sr.	Robersonville, NC, U.S.	United States Army
50	Sam Jefferson	7'2"	N/A	F	So.	Washington, DC, U.S.	Flint Hill School (Oakton, VA)
51	Ben Gillery	7'0"	N/A	C	Sr.	Detroit, MI, U.S.	Hutchinson Community College (Ks.)

== Rankings ==
Ranking movement Legend: ██ Improvement in ranking. ██ Decrease in ranking. ██ Not ranked the previous week. RV=Others receiving votes.
Poll	Pre	Wk 1	Wk 2	Wk 3	Wk 4	Wk 5	Wk 6	Wk 7	Wk 8	Wk 9	Wk 10	Wk 11	Wk 12	Wk 13	Wk 14	Wk 15	Final
AP	16	17	14	18	19	18	14	11	15	15	14		18				
Coaches	– (Note: No Coaches' Poll this week.)	12	11	16	15	16	14	11	15	15	13	20	15		25		

== 1987–88 Schedule and results ==
Sources

- All times are Eastern

Date time, TV	Rank^{#}	Opponent^{#}	Result	Record	Site (attendance) city, state
Regular Season
Fri., Nov. 27, 1987*	No. 16	at Hawaii Loa	W 92–41	1–0	Kaneohe Armory (500); Kaneohe, HI
Sat., Nov. 28, 1987*	No. 16	at Hawaii Loa	W 92–39	2–0	Kaneohe Armory (500); Kaneohe, HI
Sat., Dec. 5, 1987*	No. 16	VMI	W 81–45	3–0	Capital Centre (5,421); Landover, MD
Wed., Dec. 9, 1987*	No. 14	vs. Virginia Tech	L 82–87	3–1	Hampton Coliseum (7,121); Hampton, VA
Sat., Dec. 12, 1987*	No. 14	Saint Leo	W 78–40	4–1	Capital Centre (N/A); Landover, MD
Wed., Dec. 16, 1987*	No. 18	Maryland-Baltimore County	W 89–59	5–1	Capital Centre (5,088); Landover, MD
Sat., Dec. 19, 1987*	No. 18	Long Beach State	W 82–63	6–1	Capital Centre (6,717); Landover, MD
Mon., Dec. 21, 1987*	No. 18	Rice	W 90–63	7–1	Capital Centre (4,477); Landover, MD
Wed., Dec. 30, 1987*	No. 18	at Florida International	W 78–52	8–1	Golden Panther Arena (3,087); Fort Lauderdale, FL
Sat., Jan. 2, 1988*	No. 18	at Miami (FL)	W 82–78	9–1	James L. Knight International Center (5,023); Miami, FL
Wed., Jan. 6, 1988	No. 14	No. 2 Pittsburgh	W 62–57	10–1 (1–0)	Capital Centre (13,970); Landover, MD
Sun., Jan. 10, 1988*	No. 14	at DePaul	W 74–64	11–1	Rosemont Horizon (N/A); Rosemont, IL
Wed., Jan. 13, 1988	No. 11	at Providence	L 74–78	11–2 (1–1)	Providence Civic Center (12,696); Providence, RI
Sat., Jan. 16, 1988	No. 11	at Boston College	L 66–68	11–3 (1–2)	Silvio O. Conte Forum (7,506); Chestnut Hill, MA
Wed., Jan. 20, 1988	No. 15	St. John's	L 58–65	11–4 (1–3)	Capital Centre (10,503); Landover, MD
Sun., Jan. 24, 1988; 12:00 noon	No. 15	at No. 14 Syracuse; Rivalry	W 69–68	12–4 (2–3)	Carrier Dome (32,419); Syracuse, NY
Wed., Jan 27, 1988	No. 15	Boston College	W 58–36	13–4 (3–3)	Capital Centre (9,373); Landover, MD
Sat., Jan. 30, 1988	No. 15	Connecticut; Rivalry	W 60–59	14–4 (4–3)	Capital Centre (10,204); Landover, MD
Mon., Feb. 1, 1988	No. 15	at No. 19 Villanova	L 58–64	14–5 (4–4)	Spectrum (18,059); Philadelphia, PA
Sat., Feb. 6, 1988	No. 14	at Connecticut; Rivalry	L 59–66	14-6 (4–5)	Hartford Civic Center (16,016); Hartford, CT
Tue., Feb. 9, 1988		at Seton Hall	W 66–60	15–6 (5–5)	Brendan Byrne Arena (9,179); East Rutherford, NJ
Sat., Feb. 13, 1988; 2:00 p.m.		No. 11 Syracuse; Rivalry	W 71–69	16–6 (6–5)	Capital Centre (19,025); Landover, MD
Mon., Feb. 15, 1988		No. 20 Villanova	W 56–54	17–6 (7–5)	Capital Centre (11,816); Landover, MD
Sat., Feb. 20, 1988	No. 18	at No. 8 Pittsburgh	L 65–70	17–7 (7–6)	Civic Arena (16,721); Pittsburgh, PA
Wed., Feb 24, 1988		at St. John's	L 66–69	17–8 (7–7)	Madison Square Garden (17,892); New York, NY
Mon., Feb. 29, 1988		Providence	W 73–63	18–8 (8–7)	Capital Centre (9,658); Landover, MD
Sat., Mar. 5, 1988		Seton Hall	W 102–98 ^{2OT}	19–8 (9–7)	Capital Centre (10,243); Landover, MD
Big East tournament
Fri., Mar. 11, 1988	(3)	vs. (6) Seton Hall; Quarterfinals	L 58–61	19–9	Madison Square Garden (19,591); New York, NY
NCAA Tournament
Sat., Mar. 19, 1988	(8 E)	vs. (9 E) Louisiana State; First round	W 66–63	20–9	Hartford Civic Center (15,068); Hartford, CT
Mon., Mar. 21, 1988	(8 E)	vs. (1 E) No. 1 Temple; Second round	L 53–74	20–10	Hartford Civic Center (15,068); Hartford, CT
*Non-conference game. ^{#}Rankings from AP Poll. (#) Tournament seedings in parentheses.
