= Doug West =

American basketball player (born 1967)

Philadelphia 76ers
- Title: Assistant coach
- League: NBA

Personal information
- Born: May 27, 1967 (age 59) Altoona, Pennsylvania, U.S.
- Listed height: 6 ft 6 in (1.98 m)
- Listed weight: 200 lb (91 kg)

Career information
- High school: Altoona Area (Altoona, Pennsylvania)
- College: Villanova (1985–1989)
- NBA draft: 1989: 2nd round, 38th overall pick
- Drafted by: Minnesota Timberwolves
- Playing career: 1989–2001
- Position: Shooting guard / small forward
- Number: 5, 2

Career history

Playing
- 1989–1998: Minnesota Timberwolves
- 1998–2001: Vancouver Grizzlies

Coaching
- 2023–present: Philadelphia 76ers (assistant)

Career highlights
- Second-team All-Big East (1988); Third-team All-Big East (1989); Fourth-team Parade All-American (1985)

Career NBA statistics
- Points: 6,477 (9.6 ppg)
- Rebounds: 1,670 (2.5 rpg)
- Assists: 1,292 (1.9 apg)
- Stats at NBA.com
- Stats at Basketball Reference

Jeffery Douglas West (born May 27, 1967) is an American former professional basketball player who is an assistant coach for the Philadelphia 76ers of the National Basketball Association (NBA). A 6 ft 6 in (1.98 m) swingman from Villanova University, West was selected by the Minnesota Timberwolves in the second round of the 1989 NBA draft. An athletic, well-rounded player who could score as well as defend, West was an "original" Timberwolf, being drafted by the team in its first year of existence. He was the last of the original roster to remain on the team.

== High school career ==
West attended Altoona Area High School where he became a Parade All-American. West was a highly touted recruit by Villanova's head coach Rollie Massimino after their 1985 NCAA Championship run.

== College career ==
At Villanova University, West averaged 15 points per game, scoring 2,037 points from 1986 to 1989. He still ranks fifth on the team's all-time scoring list.

He made the Big East All-Freshman team in 1986 and was second in scoring to Harold Jensen as a sophomore at 15.2 points per game. West led the Wildcats in scoring as a junior with 16 points per game in 1988 and along with Mark Plansky, led the team to an exciting run in the 1988 NCAA tournament where Villanova upset both no. 3 Illinois then no. 2 Kentucky in the Sweet 16 before falling in the Elite 8 to no. 1 ranked Oklahoma who would eventually lose to Kansas in the NCAA Championship Game. West made the NCAA All-Southeast region team and the All-Big East team that season. As a senior in 1989 he would lead Villanova in scoring again with an 18 points per game and make All-Big East again.

== Professional career ==
=== Minnesota Timberwolves (1989–1997) ===
West was selected by the Minnesota Timberwolves in the second round of the 1989 NBA draft. An athletic, well-rounded player who could score as well as defend, he was an "original" Timberwolf, being drafted by the team in its first year of existence. He was the last of the original roster to remain on the team.

West became a regular starter for the Timberwolves during the 1991–92 season, in which he averaged 14.0 points per game, appeared in the Gatorade Slam Dunk Championship, and earned Timberwolves' Defensive Player of the Year Honors. The following season, he averaged a career high 19.3 points per game.

During the 1993 off-season, the Timberwolves made shooting guard Isaiah Rider their first round draft pick and made him the starter at the position. West was moved to small forward, where his numbers declined significantly. In 1995, he broke Tony Campbell's team-record 4,888 points to become the Timberwolves' all-time leading scorer (a distinction now held by Kevin Garnett). The following off-season, the team drafted Garnett, and West was moved to the bench, starting just 16 games. He returned to the starting lineup for the 1996–97 season when Rider was traded to the Portland Trail Blazers, which would be his last season as a starter.

=== Vancouver Grizzlies (1998–2000) ===
By the mid-1990s, injuries had begun to take their toll on West, and he was traded to the Vancouver Grizzlies in exchange for Anthony Peeler near the end of the 1997–98 season. West provided a veteran presence for the struggling young Grizzlies, but he saw very limited playing time, and he finally retired from the NBA in 2001. He had tallied career totals of 6,477 points, 1,670 rebounds, and 1,292 assists.

West's final NBA game was on December 20, 2000, in a 118–104 win over the Washington Wizards where he recorded just 1 assist and 1 block in 6 minutes of playing time.

In the late 1990s, West suffered from depression and alcoholism, for which he sought treatment.

== Coaching career ==
After the NBA, West spent two years coaching at a high school in Canonsburg, Pennsylvania, and two years as an athletic director at the private girls school, Mount de Chantal Visitation Academy high in Wheeling, West Virginia. West was an assistant coach for the Duquesne University women's basketball team for one season. West was named an assistant coach for the Villanova Wildcats, replacing Ed Pinckney on October 5, 2007. In 2012, West joined the coaching staff of the Rio Grande Valley Vipers of the NBA D-League.

On July 9, 2015, West was announced as the men's basketball head coach at Penn State Altoona.

On May 20, 2016, West was announced as the boys basketball coach at his alma mater, Altoona Area High School.

On September 5, 2023, West became an assistant coach for the Philadelphia 76ers.
