= Claude Williams (basketball, born 1965) =

American basketball player (born 1965)

Personal information
- Born: January 1, 1965 (age 61)
- Listed height: 6 ft 7 in (2.01 m)

Career information
- College: North Carolina A&T (1983–1988)
- NBA draft: 1988: undrafted
- Playing career: 1989–1998
- Position: Forward

Career history
- 1989–1991: BS Weert
- 1991–1992: Châlons-en-Champagne
- 1992–1993: Châlons-sur-Marne
- 1993–1994: Nancy
- 1994–1998: Évreux

Career highlights
- LNB Pro B champion (1994); MEAC Player of the Year (1988); MEAC Tournament MVP (1988); 3× First-team All-MEAC (1986–1988); Second-team All-MEAC (1985)

Claude Williams (born January 1, 1965) is an American former professional basketball player. He played college basketball for the North Carolina A&T Aggies before playing professionally in the Netherlands and France.

== College career ==
Williams played five seasons of college basketball for the North Carolina A&T Aggies. After appearing in just five games in 1983–84, he was a consistent member of the Aggies from 1984–85 to 1987–88. In 122 career games, he averaged 13.5 points, 8.0 rebounds, 2.4 assists and 1.7 steals per game. He was named the MEAC Player of the Year and MEAC Tournament MVP as a senior in 1988.

In 2016, Williams was inducted into the North Carolina A&T Sports Hall of Fame. As of 2016, he was third all-time in scoring (1,648), second in rebounding (973), fifth in field goals made (604), fifth in steals (196), and second in free throw attempts (676).

== Professional career ==
In 1989–90 and 1990–91, Williams played in the Netherlands for BS Weert. He led the Dutch Basketball League in steals both seasons and blocks in his second season.

For the 1991–92 season, Williams moved to France to play for Châlons-en-Champagne in the LNB Pro B. For the 1992–93 season, he joined Châlons-sur-Marne in the LNB Pro A. He returned to the Pro B to play for Nancy in 1993–94. Between 1994 and 1998, he played four seasons for Évreux, with the first season in the Pro B and the final three in the Pro A.
