= 1987–88 Connecticut Huskies men's basketball team =

American college basketball season

1987–88 Connecticut Huskies men's basketball

NIT, Champions
- Conference: Big East Conference
- Record: 20–14 (4–12 Big East)
- Head coach: Jim Calhoun (2nd season)
- Assistant coaches: Howie Dickenman; Dave Leitao; Glen Miller; Ted Woodward
- Home arena: Hugh S. Greer Field House; Hartford Civic Center

1987–88 Big East men's basketball standings
	Conf.				Overall
Team	W		L	PCT	W		L	PCT
No. 8 Pittsburgh	12	–	4	.750	24	–	7	.774
No. 9 Syracuse†	11	–	5	.688	26	–	9	.743
Georgetown	9	–	7	.563	20	–	10	.667
Villanova	9	–	7	.563	24	–	13	.649
St. John's	8	–	8	.500	17	–	12	.586
Seton Hall	8	–	8	.500	22	–	13	.629
Boston College	6	–	10	.375	18	–	15	.545
Providence	5	–	11	.313	11	–	17	.393
Connecticut	4	–	12	.250	20	–	14	.588
† 1988 Big East tournament winner As of April 4, 1988; Rankings from AP Poll

The 1987–88 Connecticut Huskies men's basketball team represented the University of Connecticut in the 1987–88 collegiate men's basketball season. The Huskies completed the season with a 20–14 overall record. They were members of the Big East Conference where they finished with a 4–12 record.

Connecticut won the 1988 National Invitation Tournament by defeating Ohio State 72–67 in the final. The Huskies played their home games at Hugh S. Greer Field House in Storrs, Connecticut and the Hartford Civic Center in Hartford, Connecticut, and they were led by second-year head coach Jim Calhoun.

== Schedule ==
Date time, TV	Rank^{#}	Opponent^{#}	Result	Record	Site (attendance) city, state
Regular Season
11/28/1987*		Maryland Eastern Shore	W 102–63	1–0	Hugh S. Greer Field House (3,805); Storrs, Connecticut
12/2/1987*; WTXX		Yale	W 69–59	2–0	Hugh S. Greer Field House (4,044); Storrs, Connecticut
12/6/1987*		Virginia	L 59–72	2–1	Hartford Civic Center (10,087); Hartford, Connecticut
12/8/1987; ESPN		at Villanova	L 61–63	2–2 (0–1)	The Pavilion (6,500); Villanova, Pennsylvania
12/12/1987*		Morgan State	W 103–80	3–2	Hugh S. Greer Field House (3,560); Storrs, Connecticut
12/22/1987*		Central Connecticut	W 99–70	4–2	Hugh S. Greer Field House (3,813); Storrs, Connecticut
12/28/1987*		Hartford; Connecticut Mutual Classic	W 96–94	5–2	Hartford Civic Center (12,103); Hartford, Connecticut
12/29/1987*		Princeton; Connecticut Mutual Classic	W 49–46	6–2	Hartford Civic Center (10,839); Hartford, Connecticut
1/2/1988*; WTXX		at Pepperdine	W 63–60	7–2	Firestone Fieldhouse (3,204); Malibu, California
1/5/1988; WTXX		at Seton Hall	L 58–71	7–3 (0–2)	Brendan Byrne Arena (6,427); East Rutherford, New Jersey
1/9/1988; NESN		Providence	W 79–72	8–3 (1–2)	Hartford Civic Center (11,239); Hartford, Connecticut
1/13/1988; WTXX		at No. 6 Pittsburgh	L 58–61	8–4 (1–3)	Civic Arena (6,798); Pittsburgh, Pennsylvania
1/16/1988; WTXX		at No. 9 Syracuse; Rivalry	W 51–50	9–4 (2–3)	Carrier Dome (29,898); Syracuse, New York
1/20/1988; NESN		Villanova	L 58–69	9–5 (2–4)	Hartford Civic Center (13,077); Hartford, Connecticut
1/23/1988; WTXX		at St. John's	L 72–79 ^{OT}	9–6 (2–5)	Carnesecca Arena (6,008); New York City, New York
1/30/1988; WTXX		at No. 15 Georgetown; Rivalry	L 59–60	9–7 (2–6)	Capital Centre (10,709); Landover, Maryland
2/2/1988; NESN		Seton Hall	L 59–61	9–8 (2–7)	Hartford Civic Center (9,274); Hartford, Connecticut
2/4/1988*		at Holy Cross	W 82–81	10–8	Hart Center (1,338); Worcester, Massachusetts
2/6/1988		No. 14 Georgetown; Rivalry	W 66–59	11–8 (3–7)	Hartford Civic Center (16,016); Hartford, Connecticut
2/8/1988; ESPN		at Providence	L 79–85	11–9 (3–8)	Providence Civic Center (7,218); Providence, Rhode Island
2/15/1988		Boston College	W 53–49	12–9 (4–8)	Hartford Civic Center (10,213); Hartford, Connecticut
2/18/1988*		at Fairfield	W 74–48	13–9	Alumni Hall (3,245); Fairfield, Connecticut
2/20/1988; NESN		No. 12 Syracuse; Rivalry	L 71–73	13–10 (4–9)	Hartford Civic Center (16,016); Hartford, Connecticut
2/23/1988; WTXX		at Boston College	L 56–64	13–11 (4–10)	Roberts Center (3,737); Boston, Massachusetts
2/27/1988; NESN		Pittsburgh	L 69–74	13–12 (4–11)	Hartford Civic Center (16,016); Hartford, Connecticut
2/29/1988; NESN		St. John's	L 62–77	13–13 (4–12)	Hartford Civic Center (10,781); Hartford, Connecticut
3/5/1988*		Brooklyn	W 90–51	14–13	Hugh S. Greer Field House (4,163); Storrs, Connecticut
Big East tournament
3/10/1988		vs. Providence; First Round	W 75–62	15–13	Madison Square Garden (19,591); New York City, New York
3/11/1988		vs. Pittsburgh; Quarterfinals	L 58–75	15–14	Madison Square Garden (19,591); New York City, New York
NIT
3/17/1988*		at West Virginia; First Round	W 62–57 ^{OT}	16–14	WVU Coliseum (4,562); Morgantown, West Virginia
3/21/1988*		Louisiana Tech; Second Round	W 65–59	17–14	Hartford Civic Center (11,331); Hartford, Connecticut
3/25/1988*		VCU; Quarterfinals	W 72–61	18–14	Hugh S. Greer Field House (4,801); Storrs, Connecticut
3/29/1988		vs. Boston College; Semifinals	W 73–67	19–14	Madison Square Garden (10,453); New York City, New York
3/30/1988*		vs. Ohio State; Finals	W 72–67	20–14	Madison Square Garden (13,779); New York City, New York
*Non-conference game. ^{#}Rankings from AP Poll. (#) Tournament seedings in parentheses. All times are in Eastern Time.

Schedule Source:
