= Jim Calhoun =

American basketball player and coach (born 1942)

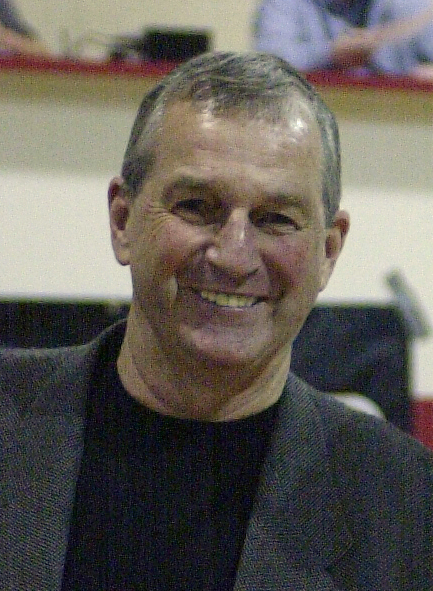
- Calhoun in 2003

Biographical details
- Born: May 10, 1942 (age 84); Braintree, Massachusetts, U.S.

Playing career
- 1965–1968: American International

Coaching career (HC unless noted)
- 1968–1969: Lyme-Old Lyme HS (CT)
- 1969-1970: Westport HS (MA)
- 1970–1972: Dedham HS (MA)
- 1972–1986: Northeastern
- 1986–2012: UConn
- 2018–2021: Saint Joseph (CT)

Head coaching record
- Overall: 920–397 (.699)
- Tournaments: 50–19 (NCAA Division I); 0–1 (NCAA Division III)

Accomplishments and honors

Championships
- 3 NCAA Division I tournament (1999, 2004, 2011); 4 NCAA Division I tournament Final Four (1999, 2004, 2009, 2011); 7 Big East tournament (1990, 1996, 1998, 1999, 2002, 2004, 2011); 10 Big East regular season (1990, 1994–1996, 1998, 1999, 2002, 2003, 2005, 2006); 5 ECAC North tournament (1981–1982, 1984–1986); 6 ECAC North regular season (1980–1982, 1984–1986); GNAC tournament (2020); GNAC regular season (2020); NIT (1988)

Awards
- John R. Wooden Legends of Coaching Award (2005); AP Coach of the Year (1990); UPI Coach of the Year (1990); CBS/Chevrolet Coach of the Year (1990); Sporting News Coach of the Year (1990); 4× Big East Coach of the Year (1990, 1994, 1996, 1998); America East Coach of the Year (1986); Best Coach/Manager ESPY Award (2019)
- Basketball Hall of Fame; Inducted in 2005 (profile)
- College Basketball Hall of Fame; Inducted in 2006 (celebrated in 2022)

James A. Calhoun (born May 10, 1942) is an American former college basketball coach. He was head coach of the University of Connecticut (UConn) men's basketball team from 1986 to 2012, during which time his teams won three NCAA national championships (1999, 2004, 2011), played in four Final Fours, won the 1988 NIT title, and won seventeen Big East Championships, which include 7 Big East tournament championships (1990, 1996, 1998, 1999, 2002, 2004, 2011) and 10 Big East regular season (1990, 1994–1996, 1998, 1999, 2002, 2003, 2005, 2006). With his team's 2011 NCAA title win, the 68-year-old Calhoun became the oldest coach to win a Division I men's basketball title. He won his 800th game in 2009 and finished his NCAA Division I career with 873 victories, ranking 11th all time as of February 2019. From 2018 to 2021, he served as head coach of the University of Saint Joseph men's basketball team. Calhoun is one of only six coaches in NCAA Division I history to win three or more championships, and he is widely considered one of the greatest coaches of all time. In 2005, he was inducted into the Basketball Hall of Fame.

== Early life and education ==
A self-described Irish Catholic, Calhoun was born and raised in Braintree, Massachusetts, where he was a standout on the basketball, football, and baseball teams at Braintree High School. After his father died of a heart attack when Calhoun was 15, he was left to watch over his large family that included five siblings. Although he received a basketball scholarship to Lowell State, he only attended the school for three months after which he returned home to help support his mother and siblings. He worked as a granite cutter, headstone engraver, scrapyard worker, shampoo factory worker, and gravedigger.

After a 20-month leave from higher education, Calhoun returned to college, this time at American International College in Springfield, Massachusetts, where he was given another basketball scholarship. He was the leading scorer on the team his junior and senior seasons, and captained the team in his final year, during which AIC advanced to the Division II playoffs. At the time he graduated, he was ranked as the fourth all-time scorer at AIC. Calhoun graduated in 1968 with a bachelor's degree in sociology.

== Coaching career ==
=== High school ===
Calhoun began his coaching career at Lyme-Old Lyme High School in Old Lyme, Connecticut in the 1968–69 season after accepting a sixth grade teaching position in that town over the summer. After finishing 1–17 that season, Calhoun returned to Massachusetts after deciding not to complete the necessary certification paperwork to renew his teaching contract (he was certified in Massachusetts and working in Conn. only on a temporary certificate). He then coached at Westport (Massachusetts) High School, in the 1969-70 season. In 1970, Calhoun accepted a position at Dedham High School as a history / social studies teacher. In addition to teaching, he was the school's varsity basketball coach and the assistant freshman football coach. In the two years before Calhoun began coaching, the basketball team had only won five games in the previous two seasons. During his first season, the Dedham Marauders went 6–12.

After his first season, Calhoun began a summer basketball league that played five nights a week. The next year, during the 1971–72 season, the team had an undefeated 18–0 season. This was only the second time in Bay State Conference history that a team went undefeated. During the Bay State Conference championship game, there were two seconds left on the clock when the Marauders were playing Needham High School. Charlie Baker inbounded the ball. A Dedham player, Jeff Dillion, stole the ball, laid it up, and Dedham won the game by one point. The team entered the TECH Tournament as the number one seed but lost to North Quincy High School in the semifinals at the Boston Garden.

Calhoun was the guest speaker at the 1995 Dedham High School boys basketball championship banquet, the graduation speaker for Dedham High School's class of 2011, and a member of the 2023 class of inductees to the Dedham High School Athletic Hall of Fame.

=== Northeastern ===
Calhoun was recruited by Northeastern University in Boston to serve as their new head coach. He took the position in October 1972. He transitioned the team from Division II to Division I in 1979.

The Huskies advanced to the Division I tournament 4 times under Calhoun. During his final three seasons, Northeastern achieved automatic bids to the NCAA tournament and had a 72–19 record. He received six regional Coach of the Year accolades at Northeastern and remains the institution's all-time winningest coach (245–138).

Former Boston Celtics captain Reggie Lewis, who played for Calhoun at Northeastern, was a first-round pick in the 1987 NBA draft.

=== UConn ===
On May 14, 1986, Calhoun was named the head coach at UConn. After completing his first season just 9–19, Calhoun led the Huskies to a 20–14 record in 1988 and a bid to National Invitation Tournament, where they defeated Ohio State to win the NIT championship. In 1990, Calhoun was named the consensus National Coach of the Year after leading the Huskies to their first Big East Conference championship, the NCAA tournament Elite Eight, and a 31–6 record in only his fourth year at the helm.

Calhoun won his first NCAA national championship in 1999, as he led UConn to its first Final Four, ultimately defeating Duke in the championship game in St. Petersburg, Florida. Future NBA standout Richard "Rip" Hamilton led the team to a 77–74 victory. Earlier that year, Calhoun had passed Hugh Greer to become the winningest coach in UConn history.

Calhoun led the Huskies to another national championship in 2004, at the conclusion of a season that saw UConn start and complete the year as the number one team in the nation. UConn standouts Emeka Okafor and Ben Gordon were selected No. 2 and No. 3 in the NBA draft, respectively. Calhoun now holds a 35–12 record with UConn in NCAA tournament play including 3–1 in the Final Four. They lost in the first round for the first time on March 21, 2008, in overtime to San Diego.

During the Jim Calhoun era, the Huskies did well in the Big East Conference with an impressive 220–112 record (.665 winning percentage). The Huskies won or shared conference titles in 1990, 1994–1996, 1998–1999, 2002, 2003 and 2005–2006. UConn also won seven Big East men's basketball tournament championships in 1990, 1996, 1998, 1999, 2002, 2004, and 2011.

On March 2, 2005, he achieved his 700th win at Gampel Pavilion over the Georgetown Hoyas. His friend and Big East rival coach Jim Boeheim also won his 700th game during the previous week. Later in 2005, Coach Calhoun was honored by induction into the Naismith Memorial Basketball Hall of Fame, fittingly, along with Boeheim. On February 25, 2009, he achieved his 800th win at the Bradley Center over Marquette.

Calhoun was the first coach in NCAA history to have won at least 240 games at two different Division I schools. Eddie Sutton later achieved this same feat.

Calhoun also coached 23 UConn players who have moved on to professional ranks.

Calhoun developed a reputation for colorful conduct during press conferences. On February 6, 2004, Calhoun exploded in a four-letter word laced rant at Dave Solomon, a columnist for the New Haven Register, who asked about Calhoun's failure to recruit Ryan Gomes after Gomes and his Providence College team torched the Huskies.

Five years later, Calhoun hollered at journalist Ken Krayeske for asking about Calhoun's status as the highest paid state employee in Connecticut., Calhoun responded "Not a dime back!" to the inquiry about his salary and "the state's budget deficit, which is estimated at $944 million for the current fiscal year and up to $8 billion over the next two years." Gov. M. Jodi Rell called Calhoun's salary outburst "embarrassing."

The interaction went viral, inspiring an infographic at Deadspin.com "Is Your State's Highest Paid Employee a Coach? (Probably). The Huskies fan blog A dime back took its name from the interaction. Calhoun's tin ear in a time of austerity made him a target of mockery, like where fans at Marquette University put Calhoun's face on a dime. At the time, Calhoun's contract paid him $1.5 million annually, even though he told Krayeske "I make more than that."

Calhoun signed a five-year, $16 million contract until 2014. Calhoun's 2025 autobiography, More than a Game, does not discuss the incident.

On April 4, 2011, Calhoun won his third NCAA title as the Huskies defeated Butler 53–41. The victory over Butler made Calhoun, at 68, the oldest coach to win an NCAA Division I men's basketball title. With the win, Calhoun joined John Wooden, Adolph Rupp, Bob Knight, and Mike Krzyzewski as the only coaches to win at least 3 national championships.

On September 13, 2012, Calhoun announced his retirement and the head coaching position was given to assistant coach Kevin Ollie, who eventually was named the permanent head coach.

==== Sanctions ====
In March 2009, the NCAA investigated potential violations in UConn's recruitment of Nate Miles (a scholarship recipient expelled without playing a single game for the Huskies). The NCAA eventually determined that a former UConn team manager, who was attempting to become an NBA agent, helped guide Miles to UConn by giving him lodging, transportation and meals. The former team manager, Josh Nochimson, was deemed a UConn representative under NCAA rules and his actions were therefore ascribed to UConn. As a result, in February 2011, Calhoun was cited by the NCAA for failing to create an atmosphere of compliance and suspended for the first three Big East games of 2011–2012 season. The NCAA's chairman of the Committee on Infractions stated, after the penalty was announced, that "the head coach should be aware, but, also in the same frame, the head coach obviously cannot be aware of everything that goes on within the program. However, the head coach bears that responsibility." The school admitted that it had committed major NCAA violations.

==== Health problems ====
On February 3, 2003, Calhoun announced that he had been diagnosed with prostate cancer. He took an immediate leave of absence from the team and underwent surgery three days later to have his prostate removed. He was released from the hospital on February 9 and within days was once again involved in the day-to-day operation of the program. On February 22 Jim Calhoun returned to the sidelines for the team's matchup with St. John's at Gampel Pavilion, only 16 days after the surgery.

On May 30, 2008, UConn announced that Calhoun was undergoing treatment for squamous cell carcinoma.

On June 13, 2009, Calhoun fell during a charity bike event and broke five ribs.

On January 19, 2010, Calhoun took a leave of absence from the team again for health reasons. Calhoun had a "serious" condition that he wanted to discuss with his family. Calhoun returned to the court to coach the Huskies on February 13.

On February 3, 2012, Calhoun took a medical leave of absence from coaching as a result of spinal stenosis. He returned on March 3, 2012, less than a week after having back surgery, to coach the team to a win over Pittsburgh in the final game of the regular season.

After a left hip fracture, he received while bike riding on August 4, 2012, Calhoun had surgery that same day.

During E:60's Calhoun Project documentary, it was revealed that Calhoun had beat Stage 4 stomach cancer at the beginning of his first season at the University of Saint Joseph, a cancer he had for two years.

==== Retirement ====
Calhoun retired as Connecticut's basketball coach on September 13, 2012, closing a 26-year career at UConn.

=== Comeback in Division III ===
On September 18, 2018, Calhoun was named the first head coach of the men's basketball team at the University of Saint Joseph (USJ), an NCAA Division III program in West Hartford, Connecticut. He told the school website: "Whether it's Division I or Division III, the kids are the kids, and the game is the game and I'm looking forward to getting back out on the court and teaching these young men each and every day. I really missed being a part of a team." Glen Miller became his assistant at USJ. Calhoun's 2019–20 team at USJ had a 25-game winning streak before losing in the first round of the Division III postseason tournament.

On November 18, 2021, Calhoun announced he would step down as head coach at St. Joseph, effective immediately. He retired with a career head coaching record of 920–397.

== Awards and honors ==
- 1998 – The Franciscan Sisters dedicate an outdoor basketball area, "Calhoun's Court" at the Franciscan Life Center in Meriden, Connecticut
- 2004 – Calhoun is the first recipient of an award by the Swim Across The Sound Prostate Cancer Institute
- 2005 – "Honorary Alumni Award" from the University of Connecticut Alumni Association
- 2005 – Inducted into the Basketball Hall of Fame, Springfield, Massachusetts
- 2019 – Received the Best Coach award at the 2019 ESPYs in Los Angeles, California
- 2023 - Dedham High School Athletic Hall of Fame

== Head coaching record ==
=== College ===
Record table
| Season | Team | Overall | Conference | Standing | Postseason |
|---|---|---|---|---|---|
Northeastern Huskies (Unknown/ECAC North/North Atlantic Conference) (1972–1986)
| 1972–73 | Northeastern | 19–7 | | | |
| 1973–74 | Northeastern | 12–11 | | | |
| 1974–75 | Northeastern | 12–12 | | | |
| 1975–76 | Northeastern | 12–13 | | | |
| 1976–77 | Northeastern | 12–14 | | | |
| 1977–78 | Northeastern | 14–12 | | | |
| 1978–79 | Northeastern | 13–13 | | | |
| 1979–80 | Northeastern | 19–8 | 19–7 | T–1st | |
| 1980–81 | Northeastern | 24–6 | 6–0 | 1st | NCAA Division I Second Round |
| 1981–82 | Northeastern | 23–7 | 8–1 | 1st | NCAA Division I Second Round |
| 1982–83 | Northeastern | 13–15 | 4–6 | 6th | |
| 1983–84 | Northeastern | 27–5 | 14–0 | 1st | NCAA Division I First Round |
| 1984–85 | Northeastern | 22–9 | 13–3 | T–1st | NCAA Division I First Round |
| 1985–86 | Northeastern | 26–5 | 16–2 | 1st | NCAA Division I First Round |
| Northeastern: | | 248–137 (.644) | 95–24 (.798) | | |
Connecticut Huskies (Big East Conference) (1986–2012)
| 1986–87 | Connecticut | 9–19 | 3–13 | T–8th | |
| 1987–88 | Connecticut | 20–14 | 4–12 | 9th | NIT champion |
| 1988–89 | Connecticut | 18–13 | 6–10 | T–7th | NIT Quarterfinal |
| 1989–90 | Connecticut | 31–6 | 12–4 | T–1st | NCAA Division I Elite Eight |
| 1990–91 | Connecticut | 20–11 | 9–7 | 3rd | NCAA Division I Sweet 16 |
| 1991–92 | Connecticut | 20–10 | 10–8 | T–3rd | NCAA Division I Second Round |
| 1992–93 | Connecticut | 15–13 | 9–9 | T–4th | NIT First Round |
| 1993–94 | Connecticut | 29–5 | 16–2 | 1st | NCAA Division I Sweet 16 |
| 1994–95 | Connecticut | 28–5 | 16–2 | 1st | NCAA Division I Elite Eight |
| 1995–96 | Connecticut | 30–2 | 17–1 | 1st (BE 6) | NCAA Division I Sweet 16* |
| 1996–97 | Connecticut | 18–15 | 7–11 | 6th (BE 6) | NIT Third Place |
| 1997–98 | Connecticut | 32–5 | 15–3 | 1st (BE 6) | NCAA Division I Elite Eight |
| 1998–99 | Connecticut | 34–2 | 16–2 | 1st | NCAA Division I Champion |
| 1999–00 | Connecticut | 25–10 | 10–6 | T–3rd | NCAA Division I Second Round |
| 2000–01 | Connecticut | 20–12 | 8–8 | T–3rd (East) | NIT Second Round |
| 2001–02 | Connecticut | 27–7 | 13–3 | 1st (East) | NCAA Division I Elite Eight |
| 2002–03 | Connecticut | 23–10 | 10–6 | T–1st (East) | NCAA Division I Sweet 16 |
| 2003–04 | Connecticut | 33–6 | 12–4 | 2nd | NCAA Division I Champion |
| 2004–05 | Connecticut | 23–8 | 13–3 | T–1st | NCAA Division I Second Round |
| 2005–06 | Connecticut | 30–4 | 14–2 | T–1st | NCAA Division I Elite Eight |
| 2006–07 | Connecticut | 17–14 | 6–10 | 8th | |
| 2007–08 | Connecticut | 24–9 | 13–5 | 3rd | NCAA Division I First Round |
| 2008–09 | Connecticut | 31–5 | 15–3 | 2nd | NCAA Division I Final Four |
| 2009–10 | Connecticut | 18–16 | 7–11 | T–11th | NIT Second Round |
| 2010–11 | Connecticut | 32–9 | 9–9 | 9th | NCAA Division I Champion |
| 2011–12 | Connecticut | 18–13 (20–14) | 6–9 (8–10) | 9th | NCAA Division I First Round |
| Connecticut: | | 625–243 (.720) | 276–163 (.629) | | |
Saint Joseph Blue Jays (Great Northeast Athletic Conference) (2018–2021)
| 2018–19 | Saint Joseph | 16–12 | 5–6 | 7th | |
| 2019–20 | Saint Joseph | 26–3 | 11–0 | 1st | NCAA Division III First Round |
| 2020–21 | Saint Joseph | 2–2 | 0–0 | | |
| 2021–22 | Saint Joseph | 3–0 (Note: Calhoun retired for the second time after coaching in three games in the 2021–22 season.) | 0–0 | | |
| Saint Joseph: | | 47–17 (.734) | 16–6 (.727) | | |
| Total: | | 920–397 (.699) | | | |
National champion Postseason invitational champion Conference regular season champion Conference regular season and conference tournament champion Division regular season champion Division regular season and conference tournament champion Conference tournament champion

* Connecticut had its 2–1 record in the 1996 NCAA tournament and Sweet 16 appearance vacated after two players were ruled ineligible.

As of April 5, 2013, Calhoun has a 50–19 (.725) record in the NCAA tournament, going 2–5 (.286) at Northeastern and 48–14 (.774) at Connecticut.

Due to COVID-19 complications, the 2020–21 season was shortened and the team finished with a 3–2 record. Calhoun wasn't able to be on the sidelines for a game that year due to an injury he suffered right before the season.

== See also ==
- List of college men's basketball career coaching wins leaders
- List of NCAA Division I men's basketball tournament Final Four appearances by coach
