= 1987–88 Syracuse Orangemen basketball team =

American college basketball season

1987–88 Syracuse Orangemen basketball

Big East Tournament Champions

NCAA tournament, second round, L 94–97 vs. Rhode Island
- Conference: Big East Conference

Ranking
- Coaches: No. 9
- AP: No. 9
- Record: 26–9 (11–5 Big East)
- Head coach: Jim Boeheim (12th season)
- Assistant coaches: Bernie Fine (12th season); Wayne Morgan (4th season); Barry Copeland (2nd season)
- Home arena: Carrier Dome

1987–88 Big East men's basketball standings
| | Conf. | | | | Overall |
| Team | W | | L | PCT | W | | L | PCT |
|---|---|---|---|---|---|---|---|---|
| No. 8 Pittsburgh | 12 | – | 4 | .750 | 24 | – | 7 | .774 |
| No. 9 Syracuse† | 11 | – | 5 | .688 | 26 | – | 9 | .743 |
| Georgetown | 9 | – | 7 | .563 | 20 | – | 10 | .667 |
| Villanova | 9 | – | 7 | .563 | 24 | – | 13 | .649 |
| St. John's | 8 | – | 8 | .500 | 17 | – | 12 | .586 |
| Seton Hall | 8 | – | 8 | .500 | 22 | – | 13 | .629 |
| Boston College | 6 | – | 10 | .375 | 18 | – | 15 | .545 |
| Providence | 5 | – | 11 | .313 | 11 | – | 17 | .393 |
| Connecticut | 4 | – | 12 | .250 | 20 | – | 14 | .588 |
† 1988 Big East tournament winner As of April 4, 1988; Rankings from AP Poll

The 1987–88 Syracuse Orangemen basketball team represented Syracuse University in the 1987–88 NCAA Division I men's basketball season. The head coach was Jim Boeheim, serving for his 12th year. The team played home games at the Carrier Dome in Syracuse, New York. The team finished with a 26–9 (11–5) record while making it to the second round of the NCAA tournament.

== Roster ==
1987–88 Syracuse Orange men's basketball team
Players
Coaches

| Pos. | # | Name | Height | Weight | Year | Hometown |
|---|---|---|---|---|---|---|
| C | 4 | Rony Seikaly | 6 ft 10 in (2.08 m) | 240 lb (109 kg) | Sr | Athens, Greece |
| G | 20 | Sherman Douglas | 6 ft 0 in (1.83 m) | 170 lb (77 kg) | Jr | Washington, D.C. |
| G | 21 | Matt Roe | 6 ft 5 in (1.96 m) | 175 lb (79 kg) | So | Manlius, New York |
| F/C | 30 | Derek Brower | 6 ft 9 in (2.06 m) | 230 lb (104 kg) | Sr | North Babylon, New York |
| G | 32 | Stephen Thompson | 6 ft 4 in (1.93 m) | 175 lb (79 kg) | So | Los Angeles, California |
| F | 33 | Herman Harried | 6 ft 7 in (2.01 m) | 210 lb (95 kg) | Jr | Baltimore, Maryland |
| C | 41 | Erik Rogers | 6 ft 10 in (2.08 m) | 205 lb (93 kg) | So | Temple City, California |
| F | 43 | Keith Hughes | 6 ft 7 in (2.01 m) | 205 lb (93 kg) | So | Carteret, New Jersey |
| F | 44 | Derrick Coleman | 6 ft 9 in (2.06 m) | 215 lb (98 kg) | So | Detroit, Michigan |

Head coach

- Jim Boeheim (Syracuse)

Assistant coach(es)

- Bernie Fine (Syracuse)
- Wayne Morgan (St. Lawrence)
- Barry Copeland (Central Michigan)

Legend

- (C) Team captain
- (S) Suspended
- (I) Ineligible
- (W) Walk-on
- Injured
- Current redshirt

Roster
Last update: 2019-Jan-25

== Schedule ==
| Date time, TV | Rank^{#} | Opponent^{#} | Result | Record | Site city, state |
Non-conference regular season
| Nov 21, 1987* | No. 1 | vs. No. 3 North Carolina; Hall of Fame Tip Off Classic | L 93–96 | 0–1 | Springfield Civic Center; Springfield, Massachusetts |
| Nov 27, 1987 | No. 1 | at Alaska-Anchorage; Great Alaska Shootout | W 95–79 | 1–1 | Sullivan Arena; Anchorage, Alaska |
| Nov 28, 1987* | No. 1 | vs. UAB; Great Alaska Shootout | W 79–63 | 2–1 | Sullivan Arena; Anchorage, Alaska |
| Nov 30, 1987* | No. 1 | vs. No. 17 Arizona; Great Alaska Shootout | L 69–80 | 2–2 | Sullivan Arena; Anchorage, Alaska |
| Dec 4, 1987* | No. 3 | South Florida; Carrier Classic | W 111–65 | 3–2 | Carrier Dome; Syracuse, New York |
| Dec 5, 1987* | No. 3 | TCU; Carrier Classic | W 87–58 | 4–2 | Carrier Dome; Syracuse, New York |
| Dec 7, 1987* | No. 3 | Cornell | W 95–59 | 5–2 | Carrier Dome; Syracuse, New York |
| Dec 12, 1987* | No. 8 | at Canisius | W 92–77 | 6–2 | Koessler Center; Buffalo, New York |
| Dec 17, 1987* | No. 9 | St. Bonaventure | W 111–68 | 7–2 | Carrier Dome; Syracuse, New York |
| Dec 21, 1987* | No. 7 | UTSA | W 108–84 | 8–2 | Carrier Dome (26,222); Syracuse, New York |
| Dec 28, 1987* | No. 7 | Morehead State | W 110–69 | 9–2 | Carrier Dome; Syracuse, New York |
| Jan 2, 1988* | No. 7 | Siena | W 123–72 | 10–2 | Carrier Dome; Syracuse, New York |
Big East Conference Regular Season
| Jan 5, 1988 | No. 7 | at Boston College | W 80–67 | 11–2 (1–0) | Boston Garden; Boston, Massachusetts |
| Jan 9, 1988 | No. 7 | Seton Hall | W 84–82 | 12–2 (2–0) | Carrier Dome; Syracuse, New York |
| Jan 11, 1988; ESPN | No. 7 | at Villanova | L 78–80 | 12–3 (2–1) | The Spectrum (16,284); Philadelphia, Pennsylvania |
| Jan 16, 1988; WTXX | No. 9 | Connecticut; Rivalry | L 50–51 | 12–4 (2–2) | Carrier Dome (29,898); Syracuse, New York |
| Jan 18, 1988 | No. 14 | Boston College | W 90–60 | 13–4 (3–2) | Carrier Dome; Syracuse, New York |
| Jan 24, 1988; 12:00 p.m. | No. 14 | No. 15 Georgetown; Rivalry | L 68–69 | 13–5 (3–3) | Carrier Dome (32,419); Syracuse, New York |
| Jan 27, 1988 | No. 17 | at Seton Hall | W 87–76 | 14–5 (4–3) | Brendan Byrne Arena; East Rutherford, New Jersey |
Non-conference regular season
| Jan 31, 1988 | No. 17 | No. 8 Michigan | W 89–71 | 15–5 | Carrier Dome; Syracuse, New York |
Big East Conference Regular Season
| Feb 2, 1988 | No. 12 | Providence | W 92–71 | 16–5 (5–3) | Carrier Dome; Syracuse, New York |
| Feb 6, 1988 | No. 12 | at No. 20 St. John's | W 79–62 | 17–5 (6–3) | Madison Square Garden; New York, New York |
| Feb 10, 1988; ESPN | No. 11 | at No. 5 Pittsburgh | W 84–75 | 18–5 (7–3) | Civic Arena (16,798); Pittsburgh, Pennsylvania |
| Feb 13, 1988; 2:00 p.m. | No. 11 | at Georgetown; Rivalry | L 69–71 | 18–6 (7–4) | Capital Centre (19,025); Landover, Maryland |
| Feb 17, 1988 | No. 12 | St. John's | W 82–68 | 19–6 (8–4) | Carrier Dome; Syracuse, New York |
| Feb 20, 1988; NESN | No. 12 | at Connecticut; Rivalry | W 73–71 | 20–6 (9–4) | Hartford Civic Center (16,016); Hartford, Connecticut |
| Feb 25, 1988 | No. 10 | at Providence | W 91–73 | 21–6 (10–4) | Providence Civic Center; Providence, Rhode Island |
Non-conference regular season
| Feb 28, 1988* | No. 10 | at No. 12 Kentucky | L 58–62 | 21–7 | Rupp Arena; Lexington, Kentucky |
Big East Conference Regular Season
| Mar 1, 1988; Big East TV | No. 12 | Villanova | W 71–69 | 22–7 (11–4) | Carrier Dome (16,284); Syracuse, New York |
| Mar 6, 1988; CBS | No. 12 | No. 7 Pittsburgh | L 84–85 | 22–8 (11–5) | Carrier Dome (32,492); Syracuse, New York |
Big East Tournament
| March 11, 1988*; Big East TV | (2) No. 13 | vs. (7) Boston College; Big East Tournament Quarterfinal | W 67–53 | 23–8 | Madison Square Garden (19,591); New York City, New York |
| March 12, 1988*; CBS | (2) No. 13 | vs. (6) Seton Hall; Big East Tournament Semifinal | W 68–63 | 24–8 | Madison Square Garden (19,591); New York City, New York |
| March 13, 1988*; CBS | (2) No. 13 | vs. (4) Villanova; Big East Tournament Championship | W 85–68 | 25–8 | Madison Square Garden (19,591); New York City, New York |
NCAA Tournament
| Mar 17, 1988* | (3 E) No. 9 | vs. (14 E) North Carolina A&T; First round | W 69–55 | 26–8 | Dean Smith Center; Chapel Hill, North Carolina |
| Mar 19, 1988* | (3 E) No. 9 | vs. No. 11 E Rhode Island; Second round | L 94–97 | 26–9 | Dean Smith Center; Chapel Hill, North Carolina |
*Non-conference game. ^{#}Rankings from AP Poll. (#) Tournament seedings in parentheses. E=East.
