= 1987–88 St. John's Redmen basketball team =

American college basketball season

1987–88 St. John's Redmen men's basketball

Lapchick Memorial Champions ECAC Holiday Festival Champions

NCAA men's Division I tournament, first round
- Conference: Big East Conference (1979–2013)
- Record: 17–12 (8–8 Big East)
- Head coach: Lou Carnesecca
- Assistant coaches: Brian Mahoney; Al LoBalbo; Ron Rutledge
- Home arena: Alumni Hall; Madison Square Garden

1987–88 Big East men's basketball standings
	Conf.				Overall
Team	W		L	PCT	W		L	PCT
No. 8 Pittsburgh	12	–	4	.750	24	–	7	.774
No. 9 Syracuse†	11	–	5	.688	26	–	9	.743
Georgetown	9	–	7	.563	20	–	10	.667
Villanova	9	–	7	.563	24	–	13	.649
St. John's	8	–	8	.500	17	–	12	.586
Seton Hall	8	–	8	.500	22	–	13	.629
Boston College	6	–	10	.375	18	–	15	.545
Providence	5	–	11	.313	11	–	17	.393
Connecticut	4	–	12	.250	20	–	14	.588
† 1988 Big East tournament winner As of April 4, 1988; Rankings from AP Poll

The 1987–88 St. John's Redmen basketball team represented St. John's University during the 1987–88 NCAA Division I men's basketball season. The team was coached by Lou Carnesecca in his twentieth year at the school. St. John's played its home games at Alumni Hall and Madison Square Garden and was a member of the Big East Conference.

== Roster ==
1987–88 St. John's Red Storm men's basketball team
Players
Coaches

Pos.	#	Name	Height	Weight	Year	Previous school	Hometown
G	3	Boo Harvey	5 ft 11 in (1.8 m)	—	Jr	Andrew Jackson/San Jacinto	St. Albans, NY
G	4	Michael Porter	6 ft 0 in (1.83 m)	—	Jr	Pulaski County/San Jacinto	Alexandria, VA
G	5	Marcus Broadnax	6 ft 2 in (1.88 m)	—	So	Fort Walton Beach	Fort Walton Beach, FL
C	10	Terry Bross (C)	6 ft 9 in (2.06 m)	—	Sr	Immaculata	Somerville, NJ
F/C	11	Jayson Williams	6 ft 9 in (2.06 m)	—	So	Christ the King	New York, NY
C	14	Marco Baldi	6 ft 11 in (2.11 m)	—	Jr	Long Island Lutheran	Aosta, Italy
G	15	Kevin Fitzpatrick	6 ft 1 in (1.85 m)	—	Jr	St. Francis Prep	Jackson Heights, NY
G	22	Elander Lewis	6 ft 4 in (1.93 m)	—	So	Albany High School	Albany, NY
G/F	23	Matt Brust	6 ft 5 in (1.96 m)	—	RS Jr	Babylon/North Carolina	Babylon, NY
F	31	Shelton Jones (C)	6 ft 9 in (2.06 m)	—	Sr	Amityville Memorial	Amityville, NY
F	33	Billy Singleton (I)	6 ft 7 in (2.01 m)	—	Fr	Adlai E. Stevenson	Bronx, NY
G	40	Steve Shurina (C)	6 ft 4 in (1.93 m)	—	Sr	St. Francis Prep	Woodside, NY
C	50	Sean Muto	7 ft 0 in (2.13 m)	—	Fr	Mechanicsburg	Mechanicsburg, PA

Head coach

- Lou Carnesecca (St. John's, '50)

Assistant coach(es)

- Brian Mahoney
- Al LoBalbo
- Ron Rutledge

Legend

- (C) Team captain
- (S) Suspended
- (I) Ineligible
- (W) Walk-on
- Injured
- Current redshirt

== Schedule and results ==
Date time, TV	Rank^{#}	Opponent^{#}	Result	Record	Site city, state
Regular season
11/28/87*		Harvard; Lapchick Tournament Opening Round	W 105–60	1–0	Alumni Hall; Queens, NY
11/29/87*		Loyola Marymount; Lapchick Tournament Championship	W 88–85	2–0	Alumni Hall; Queens, NY
12/02/87*		Fairleigh Dickinson	W 82–60	3–0	Alumni Hall; Queens, NY
12/05/87*		at No. 16 Kansas	L 54–63	3–1	Allen Fieldhouse; Lawrence, KS
12/09/87*		at Fordham	W 76–71 ^{2OT}	4–1	Rose Hill Gymnasium; Bronx, NY
12/12/87*		at UCLA	W 72–69	5–1	Pauley Pavilion; Los Angeles, CA
12/19/87*		Niagara	W 80–65	6–1	Alumni Hall; Queens, NY
12/28/87*		Marist; ECAC Holiday Festival Semifinal	W 66–59	7–1	Madison Square Garden; New York, NY
12/30/87*		No. 17 Kansas; ECAC Holiday Festival Championship	W 70–56	8–1	Madison Square Garden; New York, NY
01/04/88		Villanova	L 62–69	8–2 (0–1)	Alumni Hall; Queens, NY
01/09/88	No. 20	at No. 2 Pittsburgh	L 70–81	8–3 (0–2)	Fitzgerald Field House; Pittsburgh, PA
01/12/88*		Rutgers	W 73–55	9–3	Madison Square Garden; New York, NY
01/16/88		Seton Hall	W 71–70	10–3 (1–2)	Alumni Hall; Queens, NY
01/20/88		at No. 15 Georgetown	W 65–58	11–3 (2–2)	Capital Centre (10,503); Landover, MD
01/23/88		Connecticut	W 79–72	12–3 (3–2)	Alumni Hall; Queens, NY
01/27/88		at No. 19 Villanova	W 60–55	13–3 (4–2)	du Pont Pavilion; Villanova, PA
01/30/88		at Seton Hall	W 58–55	14–3 (5–2)	Meadowlands Arena; East Rutherford, NJ
02/03/88	No. 20	No. 9 Pittsburgh	L 71–88	14–4 (5–3)	Alumni Hall; Queens, NY
02/06/88	No. 20	No. 12 Syracuse	L 62–79	14–5 (5–4)	Madison Square Garden; New York, NY
02/08/88	No. 20	Boston College	L 76–80	14–6 (5–5)	Alumni Hall; Queens, NY
02/13/88		Providence	W 88–67	15–6 (6–5)	Alumni Hall; Queens, NY
02/17/88		at No. 12 Syracuse	L 68–82	15–7 (6–6)	Carrier Dome; Syracuse, NY
02/20/88*		DePaul	L 51–65	15–8	Madison Square Garden; New York, NY
02/23/88		Georgetown	W 69–66	16–8 (7–6)	Madison Square Garden (17,892); New York, NY
02/27/88		at Boston College	L 65–74	16–9 (7–7)	Boston Garden; Boston, MA
02/29/88		at Connecticut	W 77–62	17–9 (8–7)	Hartford Civic Center; Hartford, CT
03/05/88		at Providence	L 81–90	17–10 (8–8)	Providence Civic Center; Providence, RI
Big East tournament
03/11/88		vs. Villanova; Big East tournament Quarterfinal	L 68–71	17–11	Madison Square Garden; New York, NY
NCAA Tournament
03/17/88*		vs. (6) Florida; NCAA First Round	L 59–62	17–12	Jon M. Huntsman Center; Salt Lake City, UT
*Non-conference game. ^{#}Rankings from AP Poll. (#) Tournament seedings in parentheses.

== Team players drafted into the NBA ==
Round	Pick	Player	NBA club
2	27	Shelton Jones	San Antonio Spurs
