= 1988 NCAA Division I men's basketball tournament =

Edition of USA college basketball tournament

- Season: 1987–88
- Teams: 64
- Finals site: Kemper Arena, Kansas City, Missouri
- Champions: Kansas Jayhawks (2nd title, 5th title game, 8th Final Four)
- Runner-up: Oklahoma Sooners (2nd title game, 3rd Final Four)
- Semifinalists: Arizona Wildcats (1st Final Four); Duke Blue Devils (6th Final Four)
- Winning coach: Larry Brown (1st title)
- MOP: Danny Manning (Kansas)
- Attendance: 558,998
- Top scorer: Danny Manning (Kansas) (163 points)

The 1988 NCAA Division I men's basketball tournament involved 64 schools playing in single-elimination play to determine the national champion of men's NCAA Division I college basketball. The 50th annual edition of the tournament began on March 17, 1988, and ended with the championship game on April 4 returning to Kansas City for the 10th time. A total of 63 games were played.

Kansas, coached by Larry Brown, won the national title with an 83–79 victory in the final game over Big Eight Conference rival Oklahoma, coached by Billy Tubbs. As of 2026, this was the last national championship game to feature two schools from the same conference. Danny Manning of Kansas was named the tournament's Most Outstanding Player. Even though the Final Four was contested 40 miles (64 km) from its campus in Lawrence, Kansas, Kansas was considered a long shot against the top rated Sooners because Oklahoma had previously defeated the Jayhawks twice by 8 points that season—at home in Norman, Oklahoma and on the road in Kansas' Allen Fieldhouse. Kansas's upset was the third biggest point-spread upset in Championship Game history. After this upset, the 1988 Kansas team was remembered as "Danny and the Miracles."

This was the first NCAA Tournament which barred teams from playing on their home courts, or in any facility in which it played four or more regular season games. The NCAA Division I Men's Basketball Committee made this change after each of the previous two Final Fours featured a team which played its first and second-round games at home: LSU in 1986 (as a No. 11 seed) and Syracuse in 1987.

The team which was arguably hurt the most by the change was North Carolina, whose Dean Smith Center hosted for the first (and as of 2023, only) time. The Tar Heels were a No. 2 seed, but with the hosting ban now in effect, they were shipped to the West, where they were routed in the regional final by top seed Arizona. Archrival Duke was the No. 2 seed in the East and won its first two games at Chapel Hill on its way to the Final Four.

Arizona, now known as a prominent basketball powerhouse, made their debut in this year's Final Four, marking the 80th different school (including official NCAA vacations; 78th otherwise) to do so. This is notable because Arizona's Final Four appearance was the first by a new school since the 1983 tournament, the longest gap at that point.

== Schedule and venues ==
1988 first and second rounds
1988 Regionals (blue) and Final Four (red)

The following are the sites that were selected to host each round of the 1988 tournament:

First and Second Rounds

- March 17 and 19
  - East Region
    - Dean Smith Center, Chapel Hill, North Carolina (Host: University of North Carolina at Chapel Hill)
  - Midwest Region
    - Edmund P. Joyce Center, South Bend, Indiana (Host: University of Notre Dame)
  - Southeast Region
    - Omni Coliseum, Atlanta, Georgia (Host: Georgia Tech)
  - West Region
    - Jon M. Huntsman Center, Salt Lake City, Utah (Host: University of Utah)
- March 18 and 20
  - East Region
    - Hartford Civic Center, Hartford, Connecticut (Host: University of Connecticut)
  - Midwest Region
    - Bob Devaney Sports Center, Lincoln, Nebraska (Host: University of Nebraska–Lincoln)
  - Southeast Region
    - Riverfront Coliseum, Cincinnati, Ohio (Hosts: University of Cincinnati, Xavier University)
  - West Region
    - Pauley Pavilion, Los Angeles, California (Host: UCLA)

Regional semifinals and finals (Sweet Sixteen and Elite Eight)

- March 24 and 26
  - East Regional, Brendan Byrne Arena, East Rutherford, New Jersey (Hosts: Seton Hall University, Big East Conference)
  - Southeast Regional, BJCC Coliseum, Birmingham, Alabama (Host: Southeastern Conference)
- March 25 and 27
  - Midwest Regional, Pontiac Silverdome, Pontiac, Michigan (Hosts: University of Detroit Mercy, Midwestern Collegiate Conference)
  - West Regional, Kingdome, Seattle, Washington (Host: University of Washington)

National semifinals and championship (Final Four and championship)

- April 2 and 4
  - Kemper Arena, Kansas City, Missouri (Host: Big 8 Conference)

== Teams ==
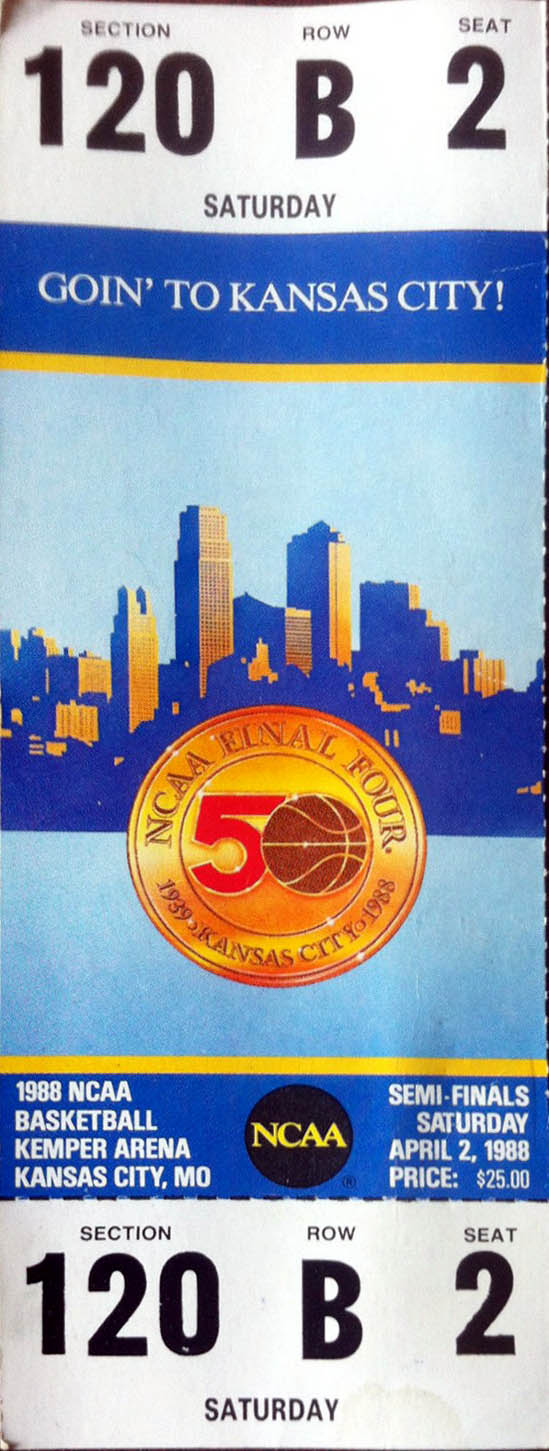
A ticket from the tournament's Final Four

Region	Seed	Team	Coach	Conference	Finished	Final opponent	Score
East
East	1	Temple	John Chaney	Atlantic 10	Regional Runner-up	2 Duke	L 63–53
East	2	Duke	Mike Krzyzewski	Atlantic Coast	National semifinals	6 Kansas	L 66–59
East	3	Syracuse	Jim Boeheim	Big East	Round of 32	11 Rhode Island	L 97–94
East	4	Indiana	Bob Knight	Big Ten	Round of 64	13 Richmond	L 72–69
East	5	Georgia Tech	Bobby Cremins	Atlantic Coast	Round of 32	13 Richmond	L 59–55
East	6	Missouri	Norm Stewart	Big Eight	Round of 64	11 Rhode Island	L 87–80
East	7	SMU	Dave Bliss	Southwest	Round of 32	2 Duke	L 94–79
East	8	Georgetown	John Thompson	Big East	Round of 32	1 Temple	L 74–53
East	9	LSU	Dale Brown	Southeastern	Round of 64	8 Georgetown	L 66–63
East	10	Notre Dame	Digger Phelps	Independent	Round of 64	7 SMU	L 83–75
East	11	Rhode Island	Tom Penders	Atlantic 10	Sweet Sixteen	2 Duke	L 73–72
East	12	Iowa State	Johnny Orr	Big Eight	Round of 64	5 Georgia Tech	L 90–78
East	13	Richmond	Dick Tarrant	Colonial	Sweet Sixteen	1 Temple	L 69–47
East	14	North Carolina A&T	Don Corbett	Mid-Eastern	Round of 64	3 Syracuse	L 69–55
East	15	Boston University	Mike Jarvis	ECAC North	Round of 64	2 Duke	L 85–69
East	16	Lehigh	Fran McCaffery	East Coast	Round of 64	1 Temple	L 87–73
Midwest
Midwest	1	Purdue	Gene Keady	Big Ten	Sweet Sixteen	4 Kansas State	L 73–70
Midwest	2	Pittsburgh	Paul Evans	Big East	Round of 32	7 Vanderbilt	L 80–74
Midwest	3	NC State	Jim Valvano	Atlantic Coast	Round of 64	14 Murray State	L 78–75
Midwest	4	Kansas State	Lon Kruger	Big Eight	Regional Runner-up	6 Kansas	L 71–58
Midwest	5	DePaul	Joey Meyer	Independent	Round of 32	4 Kansas State	L 66–58
Midwest	6	Kansas	Larry Brown	Big Eight	Champion	1 Oklahoma	W 83–79
Midwest	7	Vanderbilt	C. M. Newton	Southeastern	Sweet Sixteen	6 Kansas	L 77–64
Midwest	8	Baylor	Gene Iba	Southwest	Round of 64	9 Memphis State	L 75–60
Midwest	9	Memphis State	Larry Finch	Metro	Round of 32	1 Purdue	L 100–73
Midwest	10	Utah State	Rod Tueller	Pacific Coast	Round of 64	7 Vanderbilt	L 80–77
Midwest	11	Xavier	Pete Gillen	Midwestern	Round of 64	6 Kansas	L 85–72
Midwest	12	Wichita State	Eddie Fogler	Missouri Valley	Round of 64	5 DePaul	L 83–62
Midwest	13	La Salle	Speedy Morris	Metro Atlantic	Round of 64	4 Kansas State	L 66–53
Midwest	14	Murray State	Steve Newton	Ohio Valley	Round of 32	6 Kansas	L 61–58
Midwest	15	Eastern Michigan	Ben Braun	Mid-American	Round of 64	2 Pittsburgh	L 108–90
Midwest	16	Fairleigh Dickinson	Tom Green	ECAC Metro	Round of 64	1 Purdue	L 94–79
Southeast
Southeast	1	Oklahoma	Billy Tubbs	Big Eight	Runner Up	6 Kansas	L 83–79
Southeast	2	Kentucky (Vacated)	Eddie Sutton	Southeastern	Sweet Sixteen#	6 Villanova	L 80–74
Southeast	3	Illinois	Lou Henson	Big Ten	Round of 32	6 Villanova	L 66–63
Southeast	4	BYU	LaDell Andersen	Western Athletic	Round of 32	5 Louisville	L 97–76
Southeast	5	Louisville	Denny Crum	Metro	Sweet Sixteen	1 Oklahoma	L 108–98
Southeast	6	Villanova	Rollie Massimino	Big East	Regional Runner-up	1 Oklahoma	L 78–59
Southeast	7	Maryland (Vacated)	Bob Wade	Atlantic Coast	Round of 32	2 Kentucky	L 90–81
Southeast	8	Auburn	Sonny Smith	Southeastern	Round of 32	1 Oklahoma	L 107–87
Southeast	9	Bradley	Stan Albeck	Missouri Valley	Round of 64	8 Auburn	L 90–86
Southeast	10	UC Santa Barbara	Jerry Pimm	Pacific Coast	Round of 64	7 Maryland	L 92–82
Southeast	11	Arkansas	Nolan Richardson	Southwest	Round of 64	6 Villanova	L 82–74
Southeast	12	Oregon State	Ralph Miller	Pacific-10	Round of 64	5 Louisville	L 70–61
Southeast	13	Charlotte	Jeff Mullins	Sun Belt	Round of 64	4 BYU	L 98–92
Southeast	14	UTSA	Ken Burmeister	Trans America	Round of 64	3 Illinois	L 81–72
Southeast	15	Southern	Ben Jobe	Southwest Athletic	Round of 64	2 Kentucky	L 99–84
Southeast	16	Chattanooga	Mack McCarthy	Southern	Round of 64	1 Oklahoma	L 94–66
West
West	1	Arizona	Lute Olson	Pacific-10	National semifinals	1 Oklahoma	L 86–78
West	2	North Carolina	Dean Smith	Atlantic Coast	Regional Runner-up	1 Arizona	L 70–52
West	3	Michigan	Bill Frieder	Big Ten	Sweet Sixteen	2 North Carolina	L 78–69
West	4	UNLV	Jerry Tarkanian	Pacific Coast	Round of 32	5 Iowa	L 104–86
West	5	Iowa	Tom Davis	Big Ten	Sweet Sixteen	1 Arizona	L 99–79
West	6	Florida	Norm Sloan	Southeastern	Round of 32	3 Michigan	L 108–85
West	7	Wyoming	Benny Dees	Western Athletic	Round of 64	10 Loyola Marymount	L 119–115
West	8	Seton Hall	P.J. Carlesimo	Big East	Round of 32	1 Arizona	L 84–55
West	9	UTEP	Don Haskins	Western Athletic	Round of 64	8 Seton Hall	L 80–64
West	10	Loyola Marymount	Paul Westhead	West Coast	Round of 32	2 North Carolina	L 123–97
West	11	St. John's	Lou Carnesecca	Big East	Round of 64	6 Florida	L 62–59
West	12	Florida State	Pat Kennedy	Metro	Round of 64	5 Iowa	L 102–98
West	13	Southwest Missouri State	Charlie Spoonhour	Mid-Continent	Round of 64	4 UNLV	L 54–50
West	14	Boise State	Bobby Dye	Big Sky	Round of 64	3 Michigan	L 63–58
West	15	North Texas State	Jimmy Gales	Southland	Round of 64	2 North Carolina	L 83–65
West	16	Cornell	Mike Dement	Ivy League	Round of 64	1 Arizona	L 90–50

Kentucky and Maryland were later stripped of their NCAA tournament wins due to ineligible players.

== Bracket ==
=== East Regional – East Rutherford, New Jersey ===
First round
1	Temple	87
16	Lehigh	73
Hartford
8	Georgetown	66
9	LSU	63
5	Georgia Tech	90
12	Iowa State	78
Hartford
4	Indiana	69
13	Richmond	72
6	Missouri	80
11	Rhode Island	87
Chapel Hill
3	Syracuse	69
14	North Carolina A&T	55
7	SMU	83
10	Notre Dame	75
Chapel Hill
2	Duke	85
15	Boston University	69

Quarter-finals
1	Temple	74
8	Georgetown	53
5	Georgia Tech	55
13	Richmond	59
11	Rhode Island	97
3	Syracuse	94
7	SMU	79
2	Duke	94

Regional semifinals
1	Temple	69
13	Richmond	47
11	Rhode Island	72
2	Duke	73

Regional Finals
1	Temple	53
2	Duke	63

=== Midwest Regional – Pontiac, Michigan ===
First round
1	Purdue	94
16	Fairleigh Dickinson	79
South Bend
8	Baylor	60
9	Memphis	75
5	DePaul	83
12	Wichita State	62
South Bend
4	Kansas State	66
13	La Salle	53
6	Kansas	85
11	Xavier	72
Lincoln
3	NC State	75
14	Murray State	78
7	Vanderbilt	80
10	Utah State	77
Lincoln
2	Pittsburgh	108
15	Eastern Michigan	90

Quarter-finals
1	Purdue	100
9	Memphis	73
5	DePaul	58
4	Kansas State	66
6	Kansas	61
14	Murray State	58
7	Vanderbilt	80^{OT}
2	Pittsburgh	74

Regional semifinals
1	Purdue	70
4	Kansas State	73
6	Kansas	77
7	Vanderbilt	64

Regional Finals
4	Kansas State	58
6	Kansas	71

=== Southeast Regional – Birmingham, Alabama ===
First round
1	Oklahoma	94
16	Chattanooga	66
Atlanta
8	Auburn	90
9	Bradley	86
5	Louisville	70
12	Oregon State	61
Atlanta
4	BYU	98^{OT}
13	Charlotte	92
6	Villanova	82
11	Arkansas	74
Cincinnati
3	Illinois	81
14	UTSA	72
7	~~Maryland~~	92
10	UC Santa Barbara	82
Cincinnati
2	~~Kentucky~~	99
15	Southern	84

Quarter-finals
1	Oklahoma	107
8	Auburn	87
5	Louisville	97
4	BYU	76
6	Villanova	66
3	Illinois	63
7	~~Maryland~~	81
2	~~Kentucky~~	90

Regional semifinals
1	Oklahoma	108
5	Louisville	98
6	Villanova	80
2	~~Kentucky~~	74

Regional Finals
1	Oklahoma	78
6	Villanova	59

Kentucky was later stripped of its two NCAA tournament wins due to an ineligible player. Maryland also vacated its appearance in the 1988 tournament due to usage of ineligible players. Unlike forfeiture, a vacated game does not result in the other school being credited with a win, only with Maryland and Kentucky removing the wins from their own records.

=== West Regional – Seattle, Washington ===
First round
1	Arizona	90
16	Cornell	50
Los Angeles
8	Seton Hall	80
9	UTEP	64
5	Iowa	102
12	Florida State	98
Los Angeles
4	UNLV	54
13	Southwest Missouri State	50
6	Florida	62
11	St. John's	59
Salt Lake City
3	Michigan	63
14	Boise State	58
7	Wyoming	115
10	Loyola Marymount	119
Salt Lake City
2	North Carolina	83
15	North Texas State	65

Quarter-finals
1	Arizona	84
8	Seton Hall	55
5	Iowa	104
4	UNLV	86
6	Florida	85
3	Michigan	108
10	Loyola Marymount	97
2	North Carolina	123

Regional semifinals
1	Arizona	99
5	Iowa	79
3	Michigan	69
2	North Carolina	78

Regional Finals
1	Arizona	70
2	North Carolina	52

=== Final Four – Kansas City, Missouri ===
National semifinals
E2	Duke	59
MW6	Kansas	66
SE1	Oklahoma	86
W1	Arizona	78

National Championship Game
MW6	Kansas	83
SE1	Oklahoma	79

== Game summaries ==
Final Four
April 2

Box Score

Kansas Jayhawks 66, Duke Blue Devils 59
Scoring by half: 38–27, 28–32
Pts: Danny Manning 25; Rebs: Danny Manning 10; Asts: Kevin Pritchard 5	Pts: Danny Ferry 19; Rebs: Danny Ferry 12; Asts: Quin Snyder 5
Kansas advances to Championship Game

Kemper Arena, Kansas City, Missouri
Attendance: 16,392
Referees: Booker Turner, Jim Burr, Larry Lembo

Final Four
April 2

Box Score

Arizona Wildcats 78, Oklahoma Sooners 86
Scoring by half: 27–39, 51–47
Pts: Sean Elliott 31; Rebs: Tom Tolbert 13; Asts: Steve Kerr 5	Pts: Mookie Blaylock/Harvey Grant 21; Rebs: Harvey Grant 10; Asts: Ricky Grace 8
Oklahoma advances to Championship game

Kemper Arena, Kansas City, Missouri
Attendance: 16,392

== Announcers ==
=== Television ===
CBS Sports

- Jim Nantz & James Brown served as studio hosts.
- Brent Musburger and Billy Packer – first round (Florida–St. John's) at Salt Lake City, Utah; second round at Hartford, Connecticut and Chapel Hill, North Carolina; West Regional at Seattle, Washington; Final Four at Kansas City, Missouri
- Tim Brant and Bill Raftery – First (UNLV–SW Missouri State) and Second Rounds at Los Angeles, California; East Regional at East Rutherford, New Jersey
- Dick Stockton and Billy Cunningham – second round at Lincoln, Nebraska and Salt Lake City, Utah; Southeast Regional at Birmingham, Alabama
- Verne Lundquist and Tom Heinsohn – second round at Cincinnati, Ohio and South Bend, Indiana; Midwest Regional at Pontiac, Michigan
- Tim Ryan and Curry Kirkpatrick – second round at Atlanta, Georgia

ESPN and NCAA Productions

- John Saunders (NCAA Tournament Today) and Bob Ley (NCAA Tournament Tonight) served as studio hosts and Dick Vitale served as studio analyst.
- Mike Gorman and Ron Perry – first round (Temple–Lehigh, Georgia Tech–Iowa State) at Hartford, Connecticut
- Bob Carpenter and Dan Belluomini – first round (Indiana–Richmond, Georgetown–LSU) at Hartford, Connecticut
- Ralph Hacker and Bucky Waters – first round (Duke–Boston University, Missouri–Rhode Island) at Chapel Hill, North Carolina
- Bob Rathbun and Dan Bonner – first round (Syracuse–North Carolina A&T, SMU–Notre Dame) at Chapel Hill, North Carolina
- Fred White and Larry Conley – first round (Oklahoma–Chattanooga, Louisville–Oregon State) at Atlanta, Georgia
- Mike Patrick and Bob Ortegel – first round (Brigham Young–Charlotte, Auburn–Bradley) at Atlanta, Georgia
- Tom Hammond and Mike Pratt – first round (Kentucky–Southern, Illinois–UTSA) at Cincinnati, Ohio
- Mick Hubert and Jack Givens – first round (Villanova–Arkansas, Maryland–UC Santa Barbara) at Cincinnati, Ohio
- Eddie Doucette and John Laskowski – first round (Purdue–Fairleigh Dickinson, Kansas State–La Salle) at South Bend, Indiana
- Wayne Larrivee and Jim Gibbons – first round (DePaul–Wichita State, Baylor–Memphis State) at South Bend, Indiana
- Ron Franklin and Quinn Buckner – first round (Pittsburgh–Eastern Michigan, N.C. State–Murray State) at Lincoln, Nebraska
- John Sanders and Gary Thompson – first round (Kansas–Xavier, Vanderbilt–Utah State) at Lincoln, Nebraska
- Pete Solomon and Derrek Dickey – first round (Arizona–Cornell) at Los Angeles, California
- Phil Stone and Lynn Shackelford – first round (Iowa–Florida State, Seton Hall–UTEP) at Los Angeles, California
- Ted Robinson and Bruce Larson – first round (North Carolina–North Texas) at Salt Lake City, Utah
- Frank Fallon and Bruce Larson – first round (Michigan–Boise State) at Salt Lake City, Utah
- Frank Fallon and Irv Brown – first round (Wyoming–Loyola Marymount) at Salt Lake City, Utah

== See also ==
- 1988 NCAA Division II men's basketball tournament
- 1988 NCAA Division III men's basketball tournament
- 1988 NCAA Division I women's basketball tournament
- 1988 NCAA Division II women's basketball tournament
- 1988 NCAA Division III women's basketball tournament
- 1988 National Invitation Tournament
- 1988 National Women's Invitation Tournament
- 1988 NAIA Division I men's basketball tournament
- 1988 NAIA Division I women's basketball tournament
