= Mark Plansky =

American basketball player (born 1966)

Personal information
- Born: February 13, 1966 (age 60) Wakefield, Massachusetts, U.S.
- Listed height: 6 ft 6 in (1.98 m)
- Listed weight: 210 lb (95 kg)

Career information
- High school: Wakefield Memorial (Wakefield, Massachusetts)
- College: Villanova (1984–1988)
- NBA draft: 1988: undrafted
- Playing career: 1988–1991
- Position: Small forward

Career history
- 1988: Philadelphia Aces
- 1989: Cedar Rapids Silver Bullets
- 1989–1990: Rapid City Thrillers
- 1990: Wichita Falls Texans
- 1990: Oklahoma City Cavalry
- 1990–1991: Tulsa Fast Breakers
- 1991: Libertas Livorno

Career highlights
- NCAA champion (1985); Third-team All-Big East (1988)

Mark Plansky (born February 13, 1966) is an American former basketball player. He is best known for his college career, where he was a part of the Villanova Wildcats' 1985 national championship team. He also played professionally for several years, including a short stint in Italy's Lega Serie A.

== College career ==
Plansky came to Villanova from Wakefield Memorial High School in Wakefield, Massachusetts, where at one time it had been considered a certainty that he would attend his parents' alma mater, Boston College. A 6'6" small forward known for his hustle and soft shooting touch, Plansky was a freshman on the 1984–85 Villanova team that unexpectedly won the 1985 NCAA Tournament. Plansky was a reserve on the team and played sparingly in the championship game. He would go on to start the next three seasons for the Wildcats, finishing with 1,217 points in his four-year career. Plansky was named third-team All-Big East as a senior.

== Professional career ==
After being passed over in the 1988 NBA draft, Plansky spent the first season of his professional career first in the United States Basketball League and in Belgium. In 1989, Plansky returned to the United States to try out for a spot with the Miami Heat, in part due to his father's failing health. After being cut, he played for five teams in the Continental Basketball Association over the 1989–90 and 1990–91 seasons, averaging 11.0 points and 4.0 rebounds over 73 games. He finished the season with Libertas Livorno in Italy's top league before his playing career ended due to an Achilles tendon injury.
