= 1987–88 Temple Owls men's basketball team =

American college basketball season

1987–88 Temple Owls men's basketball

NCAA Division I regular season champions A–10 Regular Season Champions A–10 tournament champions

NCAA tournament, Elite Eight
- Conference: Atlantic 10 Conference

Ranking
- Coaches: No. 1
- AP: No. 1
- Record: 32–2 (18–0 A–10)
- Head coach: John Chaney (6th season)
- Home arena: McGonigle Hall (Capacity: 4,500)

1987–88 Atlantic 10 men's basketball standings
	Conf.				Overall
Team	W		L	PCT	W		L	PCT
No. 1 Temple †	18	–	0	1.000	32	–	2	.941
Rhode Island	14	–	4	.778	28	–	7	.800
West Virginia	12	–	6	.667	18	–	14	.563
Saint Joseph's	9	–	9	.500	15	–	14	.517
Penn State	9	–	9	.500	13	–	14	.481
George Washington	7	–	11	.389	13	–	15	.464
St. Bonaventure	7	–	11	.389	13	–	15	.464
Duquesne	6	–	12	.333	11	–	21	.344
UMass	5	–	13	.278	10	–	17	.370
Rutgers	3	–	15	.167	7	–	22	.241
† 1988 Atlantic 10 Tournament winner Rankings from AP Poll

The 1987–88 Temple Owls men's basketball team represented Temple University as a member of the Atlantic 10 Conference during the 1987–88 NCAA Division I men's basketball season.

== Roster ==
1987–88 Temple Owls men's basketball team
Players
Coaches

Pos.	#	Name	Height	Weight	Year	Previous school	Hometown
F	11	Darrin Pearsall	6 ft 7 in (2.01 m)	—
G	12	Mark Macon	6 ft 4 in (1.93 m)	185 lb (84 kg)	Fr	Buena Vista HS	Saginaw, MI
G	21	Howard Evans (C)	6 ft 1 in (1.85 m)	—	Sr
G	22	Jerome Dowdell	6 ft 3 in (1.91 m)	—	Jr
G	23	Tom Katsikis	6 ft 6 in (1.98 m)	—
F	24	Derrick Brantley	6 ft 7 in (2.01 m)	—	Sr
F	32	Mike Vreeswyk (C)	6 ft 7 in (2.01 m)	220 lb (100 kg)	Jr	Morrisville HS
F	33	Tim Perry	6 ft 9 in (2.06 m)	201 lb (91 kg)	Sr	Freehold HS	Freehold, NJ
F	34	Shawn Johnson	6 ft 7 in (2.01 m)	—
C	44	Ramón Rivas	6 ft 10 in (2.08 m)	250 lb (113 kg)	Sr	Pedro Albizu Campos	Carolina, PR
C	45	Duane Causwell	7 ft 0 in (2.13 m)	240 lb (109 kg)	So	Benjamin N. Cardozo HS	Queens, NY
G		Ernest Pollard	6 ft 6 in (1.98 m)	—
G		Shoun Randolph	6 ft 5 in (1.96 m)	—	Fr

Head coach

- John Chaney

Assistant coach(es)

Legend

- (C) Team captain
- (S) Suspended
- (I) Ineligible
- (W) Walk-on
- Injured
- Current redshirt

Roster

- Derrick Brantley (1.9 ppg)
- Duane Causwell (2.0 ppg)
- Jerome Dowdell (1.5 ppg)
- G Howard Evans (C) (Sr, 11.1 ppg), All A-10 (1st team)
- Shawn Johnson (1.8 ppg)
- Tom Katsikis (1.9 ppg)
- G Mark Macon (Fr, 20.6 ppg), AP All-American (2nd team)
- F Darrin Pearsall (Jr, 1.5 ppg)
- F Tim Perry (Sr, 14.5 ppg), A-10 Player of Year
- Ernest Pollard (1.3 ppg)
- Shoun Randolph (1.0 ppg)
- C Ramon Rivas (Sr, 6.9 ppg)
- F Mike Vreeswyk (C) (Jr, 16.7 ppg) All A-10 (2nd team)

== Schedule ==
Date time, TV	Rank^{#}	Opponent^{#}	Result	Record	Site city, state
Regular Season
December 3, 1987*; ESPN	No. 12	at UCLA	W 81–76	1–0	Pauley Pavilion (8,171); Los Angeles, CA
December 7, 1987	No. 12	at Massachusetts	W 89–71	2–0 (1–0)	Curry Hicks Cage (4,024); Amherst, MA
December 10, 1987; PRISM	No. 11	Saint Joseph's; Big 5	W 83–62	3–0 (2–0)	McGonigle Hall (4,500); Philadelphia, PA
December 12, 1987	No. 11	Rhode Island	W 75–66	4–0 (3–0)	McGonigle Hall (4,500); Philadelphia, PA
December 19, 1987*	No. 8	South Carolina	W 63–50	5–0	McGonigle Hall (4,500); Philadelphia, PA
December 28, 1987*	No. 6	vs. Ole Miss; Sugar Bowl Classic	W 70–61	6–0	Louisiana Superdome (5,402); New Orleans, LA
December 29, 1987*	No. 6	vs. Southern; Sugar Bowl Classic	W 84–47	7–0	Louisiana Superdome (4,923); New Orleans, LA
January 4, 1988; Creative Sports	No. 6	Rutgers	W 86–60	8–0 (4–0)	McGonigle Hall (4,500); Philadelphia, PA
January 6, 1988*; PRISM	No. 6	at Penn; Big 5	W 84–50	9–0	The Palestra (3,974); Philadelphia, PA
January 9, 1988	No. 6	at George Washington	W 79–66	10–0 (5–0)	Charles E. Smith Center (4,824); Washington, D.C.
January 14, 1988*; PRISM	No. 4	La Salle; Big 5	W 59–56	11–0	McGonigle Hall (4,500); Philadelphia, PA
January 16, 1988	No. 4	at St. Bonaventure	W 73–63	12–0 (6–0)	Reilly Center (6,105); St. Bonaventure, NY
January 18, 1988	No. 4	at Penn State	W 59–44	13–0 (7–0)	Rec Hall (6,747); State College, PA
January 21, 1988	No. 3	Massachusetts	W 71–52	14–0 (8–0)	McGonigle Hall (4,500); Philadelphia, PA
January 24, 1988*; ABC	No. 3	at No. 8 UNLV	L 58–59	14–1	Thomas & Mack Center (11,900); Las Vegas, NV
January 28, 1988	No. 6	St. Bonaventure	W 87–66	15–1 (9–0)	McGonigle Hall (4,500); Philadelphia, PA
January 31, 1988	No. 6	at Rhode Island	W 77–70	16–1 (10–0)	Keaney Gymnasium (4,829); Kingston, RI
February 4, 1988	No. 5	Duquesne	W 110–70	17–1 (11–0)	McGonigle Hall (4,500); Philadelphia, PA
February 6, 1988	No. 5	at Rutgers	W 84–53	18–1 (12–0)	Louis Brown Athletic Center (7,720); Piscataway, NJ
February 10, 1988*; PRISM	No. 1	No. 10 Villanova; Big 5	W 98–86	19–1	McGonigle Hall (4,500); Philadelphia, PA
February 14, 1988	No. 1	George Washington	W 92–67	20–1 (13–0)	McGonigle Hall (4,500); Philadelphia, PA
February 16, 1988; FNN/SCORE	No. 1	Penn State	W 50–49	21–1 (14–0)	McGonigle Hall (4,500); Philadelphia, PA
February 21, 1988*; NBC	No. 1	at No. 5 North Carolina	W 83–66	22–1	Dean Smith Center (21,444); Chapel Hill, NC
February 23, 1988; USA Network	No. 1	at West Virginia	W 78–69	23–1 (15–0)	WVU Coliseum (10,766); Morgantown, WV
February 25, 1988	No. 1	at Duquesne	W 94–55	24–1 (16–0)	Palumbo Center (4,567); Pittsburgh, PA
February 28, 1988	No. 1	West Virginia	W 62–61	25–1 (17–0)	McGonigle Hall (4,500); Philadelphia, PA
March 2, 1988	No. 1	at Saint Joseph's; Big 5	W 75–62	26–1 (18–0)	The Palestra (9,200); Philadelphia, PA
Atlantic 10 Tournament
March 6, 1988*; Creative Sports	(1) No. 1	vs. (8) Duquesne; Atlantic 10 tournament Quarterfinal	W 77–57	27–1	WVU Coliseum (5,746); Morgantown, WV
March 8, 1988*; Creative Sports	(1) No. 1	vs. (5) St. Joseph's; Atlantic 10 Tournament Semifinal	W 79–67	28–1	WVU Coliseum (6,036); Morgantown, WV
March 10, 1988*; ESPN	(1) No. 1	vs. (2) Rhode Island; Atlantic 10 tournament championship	W 68–63 ^{OT}	29–1	WVU Coliseum (4,149); Morgantown, WV
NCAA Tournament
March 18, 1988*; ESPN	(1 E) No. 1	vs. (16 E) Lehigh; NCAA tournament first round	W 87–73	30–1	Hartford Civic Center (15,608); Hartford, CT
March 20, 1988*; CBS	(1 E) No. 1	vs. (8 E) Georgetown; NCAA tournament second round	W 74–53	31–1	Hartford Civic Center (15,608); Hartford, CT
March 24, 1988*; CBS	(1 E) No. 1	vs. (13 E) Richmond; NCAA Tournament Sweet Sixteen	W 69–47	32–1	Brendan Byrne Arena (19,591); East Rutherford, NJ
March 26, 1988*; CBS	(1 E) No. 1	vs. (2 E) No. 5 Duke; NCAA Tournament Elite Eight	L 53–63	32–2	Brendan Byrne Arena (19,633); East Rutherford, NJ
*Non-conference game. ^{#}Rankings from AP Poll. (#) Tournament seedings in parentheses. E=East. All times are in Eastern Standard Time.

== Awards and honors ==
- Tim Perry – Atlantic 10 Player of the Year, First-team All-Atlantic 10
- Mark Macon – Consensus Second-team All-American, First-team All-Atlantic 10
- Howard Evans – First-team All-Atlantic 10
- John Chaney – AP Coach of the Year, NABC Coach of the Year, UPI Coach of the Year, USBWA National Coach of the Year, Atlantic 10 Coach of the Year

== Team players in the 1988 NBA draft ==
Round	Pick	Player	NBA club
1	7	Tim Perry	Phoenix Suns
