= 1988 Atlantic 10 men's basketball tournament =

- Classification: Division I
- Season: 1987–88
- Teams: 10
- Site: WVU Coliseum; Morgantown, West Virginia
- Champions: Temple University (3rd title)
- Winning coach: John Chaney (3rd title)
- MVP: Tom Garrick (Rhode Island)

1987–88 Atlantic 10 men's basketball standings
	Conf.				Overall
Team	W		L	PCT	W		L	PCT
No. 1 Temple †	18	–	0	1.000	32	–	2	.941
Rhode Island	14	–	4	.778	28	–	7	.800
West Virginia	12	–	6	.667	18	–	14	.563
Saint Joseph's	9	–	9	.500	15	–	14	.517
Penn State	9	–	9	.500	13	–	14	.481
George Washington	7	–	11	.389	13	–	15	.464
St. Bonaventure	7	–	11	.389	13	–	15	.464
Duquesne	6	–	12	.333	11	–	21	.344
UMass	5	–	13	.278	10	–	17	.370
Rutgers	3	–	15	.167	7	–	22	.241
† 1988 Atlantic 10 Tournament winner Rankings from AP Poll

The 1988 Atlantic 10 men's basketball tournament was played from March 5 to March 9, 1988. The tournament was played entirely at the WVU Coliseum in Morgantown, WV. The winner was named champion of the Atlantic 10 Conference and received an automatic bid to the 1988 NCAA Men's Division I Basketball Tournament. The Temple Owls won the tournament for the second straight year, and third of the previous four.

The Most Outstanding Player from the tournament was Tom Garrick (Rhode Island), who averaged 31 points per game during the tournament. The rest of the All-Championship team was: Ivan Brown (St. Joseph's), Howard Evans (Temple), Mark Macon (Temple), Carlton Owens (Rhode Island), and Mike Vreeswyk (Temple).

== Bracket ==
First round
8	Duquesne	81
9	UMass	75
7	George Washington	71
10	Rutgers	78

Quarterfinals
1	#1 Temple	77
8	Duquesne	57
4	Penn State	78^{(OT)}
5	Saint Joseph's	85
2	Rhode Island	104
10	Rutgers	73
3	West Virginia	57
6	St. Bonaventure	40

Semifinals
1	#1 Temple	79
5	Saint Joseph's	67
2	Rhode Island	65
3	West Virginia	63

Final
1	#1 Temple	68
2	Rhode Island	63
