= Morrisville, Bucks County, Pennsylvania =

Borough in Pennsylvania, United States

Morrisville, Pennsylvania
- Borough
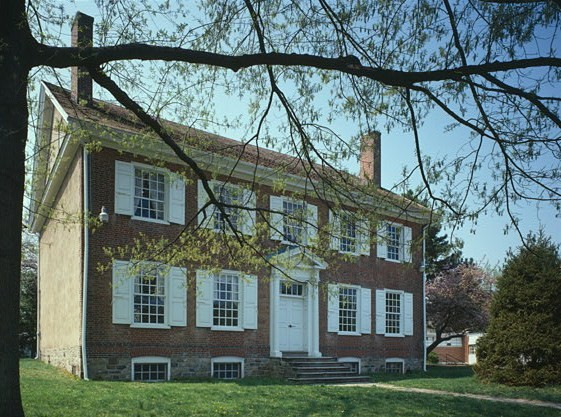
- Summerseat, home of Robert Morris

- Seal

- Location in Bucks County, Pennsylvania

- Location in Pennsylvania Location in the United States
- Coordinates: 40°12′27″N 74°46′48″W
- Country: United States
- State: Pennsylvania
- County: Bucks
- Settled: 1624
- Named for: Robert Morris

Government
  - Mayor: Gary Wallace

Area
  - Total: 1.95 sq mi (5.05 km^{2})
  - Land: 1.75 sq mi (4.52 km^{2})
  - Water: 0.20 sq mi (0.52 km^{2})
- Elevation: 56 ft (17 m)

Population (2020)
  - Total: 9,809
  - Density: 5,615.7/sq mi (2,168.22/km^{2})
- Time zone: UTC-5 (EST)
  - Summer (DST): UTC-4 (EDT)
- ZIP Code: 19067
- Area code: 215
- FIPS code: 42-51144
- GNIS feature ID: 1214970
- Website: www.morrisvilleboro.org

Morrisville (/ˈmɒrɪsvɪl/, locally: [ˈmɑɹz-]) is a borough in Bucks County, Pennsylvania, United States. It is located just below the falls of the Delaware River opposite Trenton, New Jersey. The population was 9,809 in the 2020 census.

Morrisville is located 27 miles (43 km) northeast of Philadelphia and 46 miles (74 km) southeast of Allentown.

== History ==
The earliest known settlement in what is now Morrisville, was a trading post of the Dutch West India Company operating from 1624 to 1627 on an island in the Delaware River. In its early days, the area was known as Crewcorne and was a part of Falls Township. Later, one of the first ferries to cross the Delaware was established at the site. By the late 18th century, a settlement was forming at the ferry crossing then known as Colvin's Ferry. The settlement incorporated into a borough in 1804, taking the name of Morrisville, after Founding Father Robert Morris. In that same year, the first bridge began being built across the Delaware connected Morrisville to Trenton. It would welcome traffic in 1806.

The Gershom Craft House, Summerseat, and Trenton City/Calhoun Street Bridge are listed on the National Register of Historic Places. Summerseat is also designated a National Historic Landmark.

Morrisville is also home to Graystones, the historic site marking William Penn's first Pennsylvania land purchase from the Lenape Indian tribe.

Morrisville was once considered for the nation's capital. Robert Morris campaigned behind the scenes to establish the new capital at the "Falls of the Delaware", preferably on the Pennsylvania side of the Delaware River, which can be seen from Park Avenue in Morrisville, just atop of the 30-foot tall flood control dike. The Delaware River is viewed from here and just below is the famous Falls of the Delaware, for which Falls Township was named.

== Geography ==
Morrisville is located at 40°12′27″N 74°46′48″W (40.207458, -74.779918). It is part of a geographical salient that is mostly surrounded by New Jersey.

Originally a village located in Falls Township, until it was partitioned as a borough by the Pennsylvania Legislature in 1804, Morrisville is bordered by Falls Township to the south, Lower Makefield Township to the north and the Delaware River to the east.

Its name is the default city name in the 19067 ZIP code, which covers an area that includes Yardley, Lower Makefield, Morrisville, and part of Falls Township.

According to the United States Census Bureau, the borough has a total area of 2.0 square miles (5.1 km^{2}), of which 1.8 square miles (4.6 km^{2}) is land and 0.2 square mile (0.5 km^{2}) (10.15%) is water.

There are several parks within Morrisville's borders, and the Delaware Canal State Park runs near the eastern border of both the town and Pennsylvania. Located between the Calhoun Street Bridge and the Lower Trenton Bridge (Trenton Makes) is Williamson Park, home to Morrisville Little League and many community events. Adjacent to Graystones is Graystones woods, a tract of woodland that extends from the Delaware Canal to Crown Street in the town's far north. Just south of the Trenton–Morrisville Toll Bridge and the Morrisville–Trenton Railroad Bridge lie two smaller parks, the Morrisville Riverfront Preserve, an 8.8-acre tract preserving some of the last bits of the Delaware River's tidal basin, and the Morrisville Dog Park, a two pen playground for dogs big and small.

== Demographics ==
Historical population
Census	Pop.	Note	%±
1810	266		—
1820	391		47.0%
1830	531		35.8%
1840	405		−23.7%
1850	565		39.5%
1860	784		38.8%
1870	813		3.7%
1880	968		19.1%
1890	1,208		24.8%
1900	1,371		13.5%
1910	2,002		46.0%
1920	3,639		81.8%
1930	5,368		47.5%
1940	5,493		2.3%
1950	6,787		23.6%
1960	7,790		14.8%
1970	11,309		45.2%
1980	9,845		−12.9%
1990	9,765		−0.8%
2000	10,023		2.6%
2010	8,728		−12.9%
2020	9,809		12.4%

As of the 2020 census, there were 9,089 people residing in the borough. Of the 4,013 households, 43.6% were married couple families, 26.3% had a female householder with no spouse, and 20.1% had a male householder with no spouse. The average family size was 2.88.

The racial makeup of the borough was 57.3% Non-Hispanic white, 22.1% Black or African American, 2.0% Asian, 0.4% American Indian and Alaska Native, 5.3% some other race, and 10.0% were two or more races. 13.6% were of Hispanic or Latino ancestry and 9.6% were foreign born.

The median age of residents was 40 years, and 14.9% were 65 years old or older.

The employment rate was 68.8% and the median income for a household was $81,028, while the median income of a married-couple family was $127,629. 6.7% of residents were below the poverty line, including 6.0% of those under age 18 and 2.6% of those age 65 and over.

== Education ==
The local school district is the Morrisville Borough School District.

== Etymology ==
The borough is named for American Founding Father, Pennsylvania merchant, and banker Robert Morris, the main financier of the American Revolution. His home Summerseat still stands in town.

== Sports ==
In 1955, the Morrisville Little League baseball team defeated Merchantville, New Jersey to claim the Little League World Series title. It is one of four Pennsylvania teams to have won the tournament since its inception in 1947.

== Transportation ==
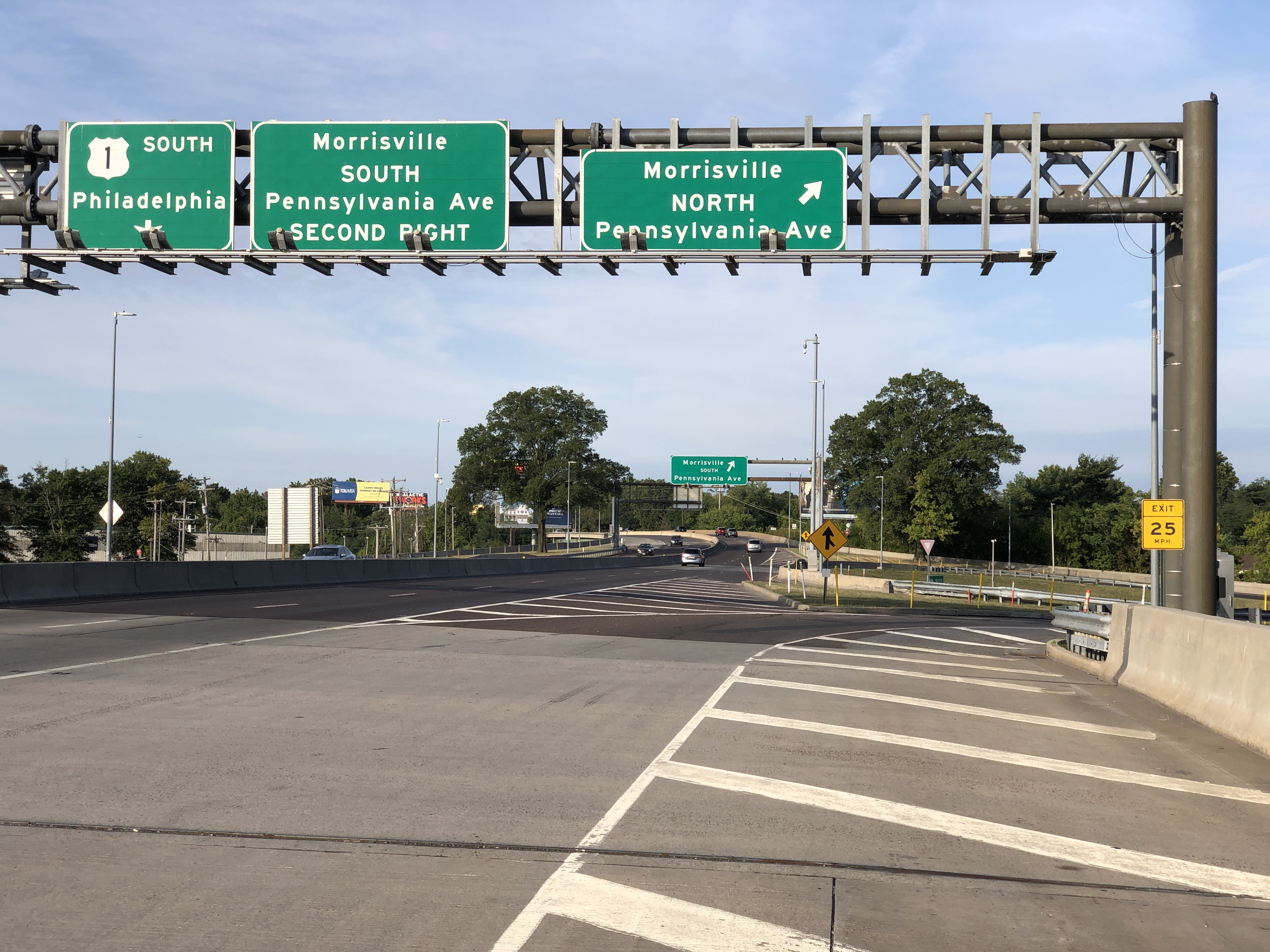
US 1 southbound in Morrisville

As of 2019 there were 32.16 miles (51.76 km) of public roads in Morrisville, of which 6.25 miles (10.06 km) were maintained by the Pennsylvania Department of Transportation (PennDOT) and 25.91 miles (41.70 km) were maintained by the borough.

U.S. Route 1 is the primary highway serving Morrisville. It follows a southwest-northeast alignment across the southeastern portion of the borough, crossing the Delaware River into New Jersey via the Trenton–Morrisville Toll Bridge. Pennsylvania Route 32 also traverses the borough, following a north-south alignment via Bridge Street, Delmorr Avenue and River Road.

SEPTA provides Suburban Bus service to Morrisville along Route 127, which runs between the Oxford Valley Mall near Langhorne and the Trenton Transit Center in Trenton, New Jersey. Amtrak's Northeast Corridor and SEPTA Regional Rail's Trenton Line pass through the borough but do not have any stations within it; the nearest station serving Amtrak and SEPTA Regional Rail is the Trenton Transit Center, which also serves NJ Transit's Northeast Corridor Line, River Line, and bus routes.

== Climate ==
According to the Köppen climate classification system, Morrisville has a Humid subtropical climate (Cfa). Cfa climates are characterized by all months having an average mean temperature > 32.0 °F (0.0 °C), at least four months with an average mean temperature ≥ 50.0 °F (10.0 °C), at least one month with an average mean temperature ≥ 71.6 °F (22.0 °C) and no significant precipitation difference between seasons. This immediately borders a humid subtropical climate (Cfa) as found in Falls Township. Although most summer days are slightly humid in Morrisville, episodes of heat and high humidity can occur with heat index values > 108 °F (42 °C). Since 1981, the highest air temperature was 103.2 °F (39.6 °C) on July 6, 2010, and the highest daily average mean dew point was 75.0 °F (23.9 °C) on August 13, 2016. The average wettest month is July, which corresponds with the annual peak in thunderstorm activity. Since 1981, the wettest calendar day was 6.35 inches (161 mm) on August 27, 2011. During the winter months, the average annual extreme minimum air temperature is 1.6 °F (−16.9 °C). Since 1981, the coldest air temperature was −10.3 °F (−23.5 °C) on January 22, 1984. Episodes of extreme cold and wind can occur, with wind chill values < −9 °F (−23 °C). The average annual snowfall (Nov-Apr) is between 24 inches (61 cm) and 30 inches (76 cm). Ice storms and large snowstorms depositing ≥ 12 inches (30 cm) of snow occur once every few years, particularly during nor’easters from

Climate data for Morrisville, Elevation 46 ft (14 m), 1991-2020 normals, extremes 1981-2018
Month	Jan	Feb	Mar	Apr	May	Jun	Jul	Aug	Sep	Oct	Nov	Dec	Year
Record high °F (°C)	71.7 (22.1)	77.9 (25.5)	87.8 (31.0)	94.7 (34.8)	95.6 (35.3)	96.9 (36.1)	103.2 (39.6)	100.5 (38.1)	98.3 (36.8)	89.3 (31.8)	81.1 (27.3)	76.1 (24.5)	103.2 (39.6)
Mean daily maximum °F (°C)	40.7 (4.8)	43.4 (6.3)	51.5 (10.8)	63.7 (17.6)	73.0 (22.8)	82.4 (28.0)	86.6 (30.3)	84.9 (29.4)	77.9 (25.5)	66.8 (19.3)	55.8 (13.2)	44.8 (7.1)	64.3 (17.9)
Daily mean °F (°C)	32.4 (0.2)	34.5 (1.4)	41.8 (5.4)	52.5 (11.4)	61.8 (16.6)	71.3 (21.8)	76.0 (24.4)	74.4 (23.6)	67.2 (19.6)	55.7 (13.2)	46.2 (7.9)	36.5 (2.5)	54.2 (12.3)
Mean daily minimum °F (°C)	24.2 (−4.3)	25.6 (−3.6)	32.1 (0.1)	41.3 (5.2)	50.6 (10.3)	60.3 (15.7)	65.3 (18.5)	64.0 (17.8)	56.5 (13.6)	44.7 (7.1)	36.6 (2.6)	28.3 (−2.1)	44.2 (6.8)
Record low °F (°C)	−10.3 (−23.5)	−2.4 (−19.1)	4.4 (−15.3)	18.0 (−7.8)	32.8 (0.4)	41.2 (5.1)	47.3 (8.5)	42.3 (5.7)	36.1 (2.3)	25.0 (−3.9)	11.7 (−11.3)	0.5 (−17.5)	−10.3 (−23.5)
Average precipitation inches (mm)	3.54 (90)	2.80 (71)	4.32 (110)	3.97 (101)	4.10 (104)	4.39 (112)	5.30 (135)	4.20 (107)	4.38 (111)	3.69 (94)	3.54 (90)	4.05 (103)	48.28 (1,226)
Average relative humidity (%)	65.4	61.7	57.8	57.0	62.1	66.1	66.2	68.6	69.8	68.8	66.9	66.8	64.8
Average dew point °F (°C)	21.6 (−5.8)	22.7 (−5.2)	28.0 (−2.2)	37.7 (3.2)	48.7 (9.3)	59.5 (15.3)	63.9 (17.7)	63.4 (17.4)	57.0 (13.9)	45.6 (7.6)	35.8 (2.1)	26.5 (−3.1)	42.6 (5.9)
Source: PRISM

== Ecology ==
According to the A. W. Kuchler U.S. potential natural vegetation types, Morrisville would have a dominant vegetation type of Appalachian Oak (104) with a dominant vegetation form of Eastern Hardwood Forest (25). The plant hardiness zone is 7a with an average annual extreme minimum air temperature of 1.6 °F (−16.9 °C). The spring bloom typically begins by April 8 and fall color usually peaks by November 3.

== Notable people ==
Morrisville is the birthplace or home to a number of well-known Americans, including:

- Thomas Barclay, America' first consul in France
- George Clymer, politician, signer of the Declaration of Independence and Constitution and Founding Father of The United States
- Willard Curtin, member of the U.S. House of Representatives
- Tony DiStefano, former motocross national champion
- Thomas Mortimer Fowler, prolific panoramic mapmaker of the 19th century.
- Dick Hart, former football player for the Philadelphia Eagles and Buffalo Bills.
- Thomas Story Kirkbride, physician and founder of the Association of Medical Superintendents of American Institutions for the Insane, which would become the American Psychiatric Association
- Michael Lenox, American strategist.
- T. Norman Mansell, architect.
- Jean Victor Marie Moreau, 18/19th century French General.
- Robert Morris, financier of the American Revolution and signer of the Declaration of Independence, the Articles of Confederation, and the Constitution.
- Danny Napoleon, professional baseball player for the New York Mets
- Asher Roth, rapper.
- James Floyd Smith inventor and aviation pioneer.
- Charles Tart, psychologist and parapsychologist.
- Mike Vreeswyk, NCAA Hall of Fame basketball player for the Temple Owls

== See also ==
- Morrisville Middle/Senior High School
