= Lower Trenton Bridge =

Bridge from Trenton, New Jersey, to Morrisville, Pennsylvania, US

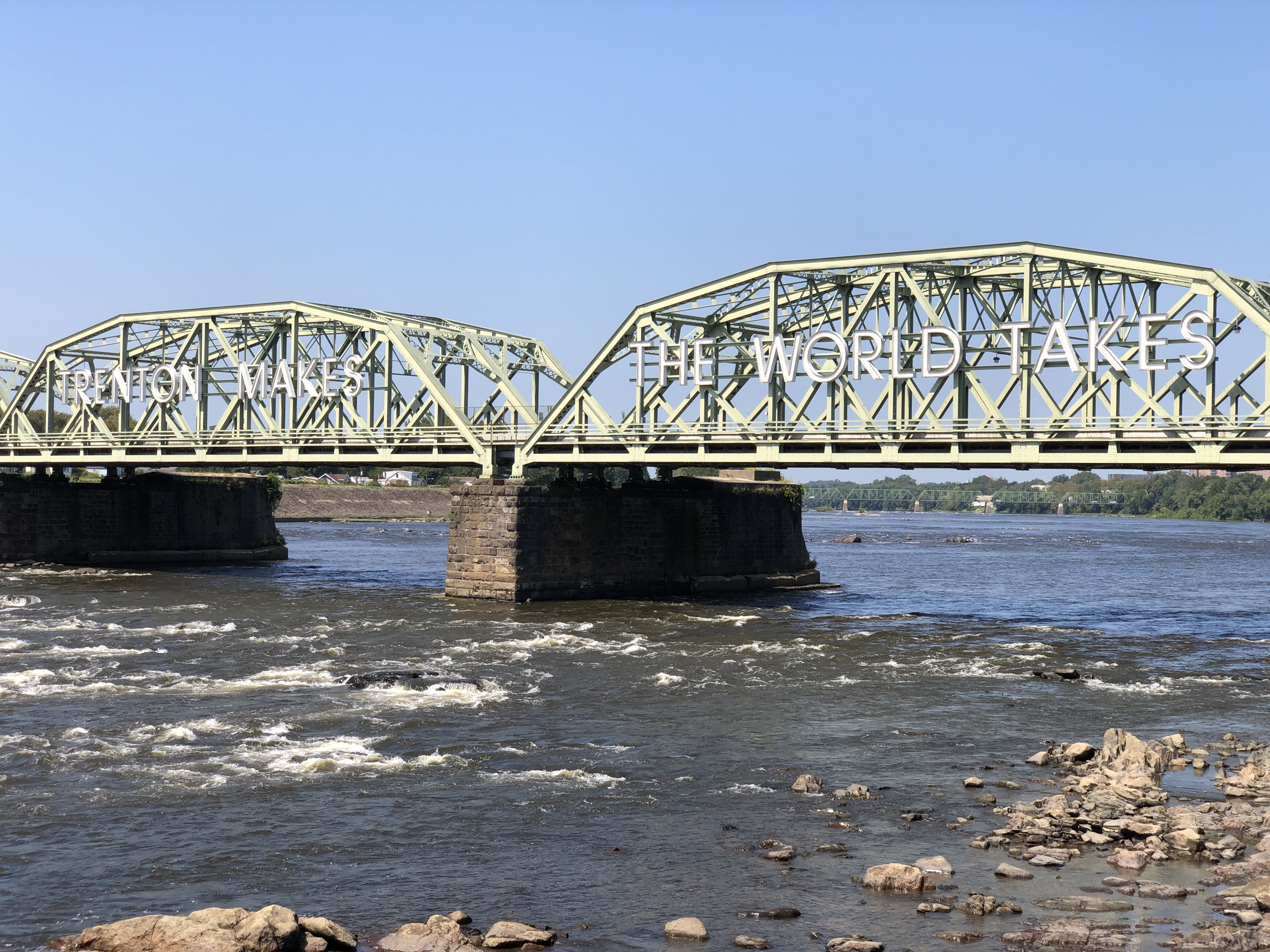
- The south side of the bridge in 2023
- Coordinates: 40.2105°N 74.7683°W
- Carries: 2 lanes of US 1 Bus. (5 ton weight limit)
- Crosses: Delaware River
- Locale: Morrisville, Pennsylvania and Trenton, New Jersey
- Official name: Lower Trenton Toll Supported Bridge
- Other name: Trenton Makes Bridge
- Maintained by: Delaware River Joint Toll Bridge Commission

Characteristics
- Design: Pennsylvania (Petit) truss bridge
- Total length: 1,022 feet (312 m)

History
- Opened: January 30, 1806 (original span); November 30, 1928 (current bridge) (load limit: 5 tons)

Statistics
- Toll: None

Location
- Interactive map of Lower Trenton Bridge

The Lower Trenton Toll Supported Bridge, commonly called the Lower Free Bridge, Warren Street Bridge or Trenton Makes Bridge, is a two-lane Pennsylvania (Petit) through truss bridge that crosses over the Delaware River between Trenton, New Jersey and Morrisville, Pennsylvania.

Owned and operated by the Delaware River Joint Toll Bridge Commission (DRJTBC), it is known as the Trenton Makes Bridge because of large lettering of its motto that was installed on the south side of the structure in 1935 that states, "TRENTON MAKES - THE WORLD TAKES".

In addition to being an important bridge from Pennsylvania to New Jersey, this structure is a major landmark in the city of Trenton. It is signed as US 1 Business, though it does not officially carry that route.

This bridge is the southernmost free road crossing of the Delaware; no toll is collected. All road crossings downstream are tolled in the westbound direction (leaving New Jersey).

== History ==
The bridge was originally a toll bridge operated by the Trenton Delaware Bridge Company. It opened on January 30, 1806, and was the first bridge across the Delaware.

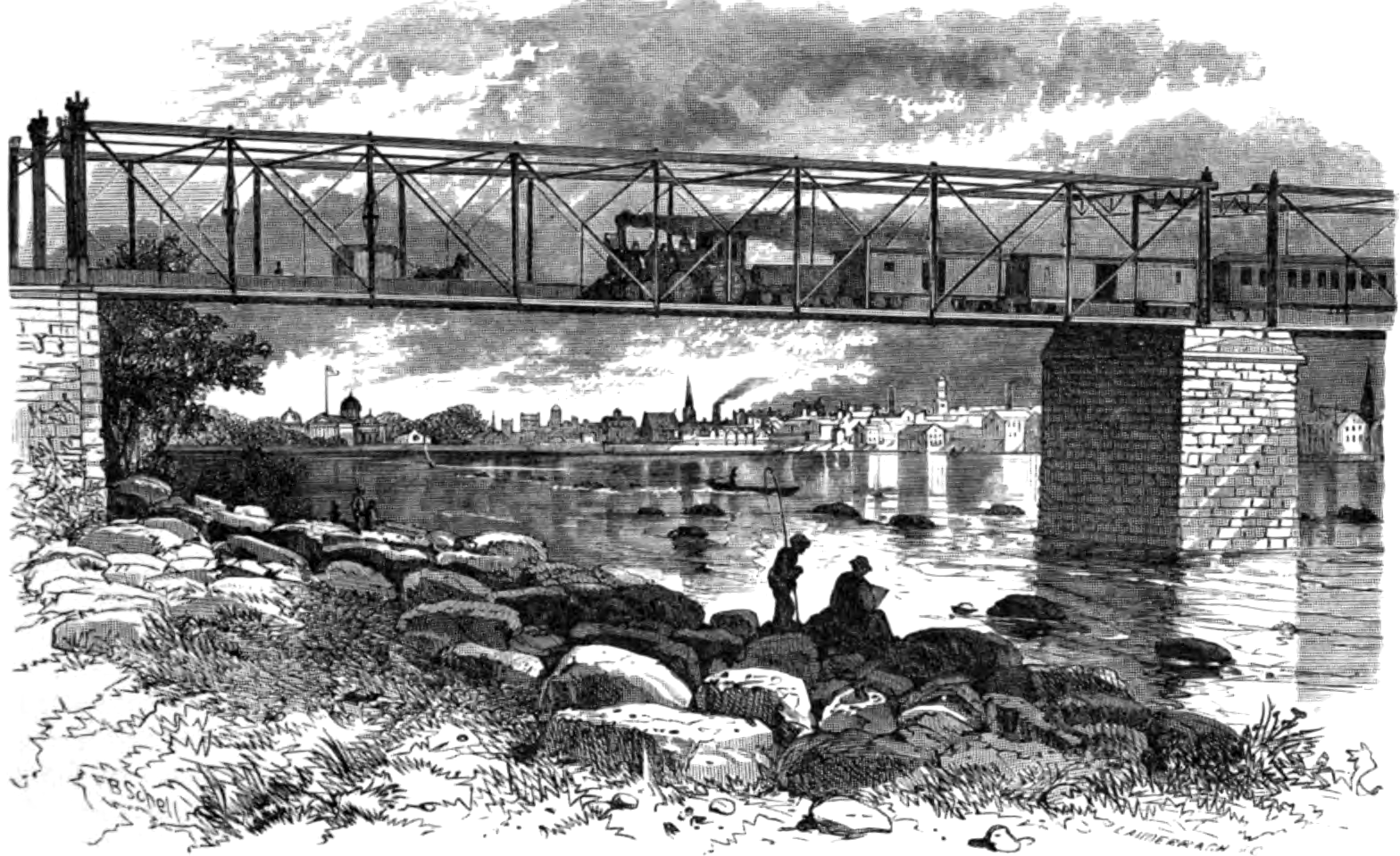
The railroad bridge in 1875

In 1835, the Camden and Amboy Rail Road bought the bridge and the competing Philadelphia and Trenton Railroad to end the rivalry and the attempts by the P&T to put tracks over the bridge. The extension over the bridge was built soon after, and it was later connected to the C&A. At the time, the Lower Trenton Bridge was the first railroad bridge in the United States to be used for interstate rail traffic. The bridge was rebuilt in 1875, 1876, 1892, and 1898 to keep up with the growing demands of rail traffic. A new alignment for the railroad was completed in 1903, crossing the river on the Morrisville-Trenton Railroad Bridge. At this point, roadway trusses dating to 1876 were left in place while railroad girders built in 1892 and 1898 were relocated to the Long Bridge in Washington, D.C.

On March 31, 1918, the bridge, then owned by the Pennsylvania Railroad, was sold to the state governments and tolls were removed. The company was dissolved September 15, 1919 in New Jersey and June 9, 1920, in Pennsylvania. With the removal of tolls, the Lincoln Highway was moved to the bridge from the tolled Calhoun Street Bridge in 1920. The bridge was then designated US Route 1 in 1927; it was replaced by the current bridge in 1928. In 1952 US 1 was moved to the new Trenton-Morrisville Toll Bridge, and for a time the old bridge was designated Alternate US 1. It is now marked as Business US 1, but only on the New Jersey side.

The "TRENTON MAKES THE WORLD TAKES" sign on the south side of the bridge was installed in 1935 and first replaced in 1981. The slogan was originally "The World Takes, Trenton Makes" and came from a contest sponsored by the Trenton Chamber of Commerce in 1910. S. Roy Heath, the former Heath Lumber founder and New Jersey State Senator, coined the phrase. In 2005, the sign was replaced with one featuring higher-efficiency neon lighting, with better waterproofing than the old sign, to help reduce maintenance costs. In 2018, the neon tubes were replaced with an array of light-emitting diodes, greatly decreasing electricity costs and allowing the sign to be programmed to display multiple colors, patterns and flashing sequences. Numerous holidays have a particular color pattern, and members of the public can submit requests to honor other groups or events.

== Appearances in popular culture ==
The "TRENTON MAKES THE WORLD TAKES" sign can be seen in

- at the end of the film Human Desire (1954) starring Glenn Ford. He is a locomotive engineer who drives a train across the river and the sign can be seen in the background.
- the 1983 movie Baby, It's You as part of a road trip to the Jersey Shore
- the 1988 movie Stealing Home when Mark Harmon's bus crosses the bridge
- Trenton's Poor Righteous Teachers 1990 video of their song "Rock Dis Funky Joint"
- on the cover of The Cryptkeeper Five's 2004 album Trenton Makes.
- the 2007 film Rocket Science
- the unaired pilot of House
- the 2012 comedy film One for the Money, during the opening scene where Katherine Heigl's character narrates that she is from a "blue collar chunk o' Trenton called 'The Burg.'"
- the 2012 Republican National Convention during Governor Chris Christie's Keynote Address
- the beginning of the Gangland episode about Trenton
- the logo of the Trenton Titans.
- the title of the 2018 novel Trenton Makes by Tadzio Koelb.
- [filming location; sign not seen in] denouement (season 7, episode 12) of the TV Series "Elementary" (2019) where Sherlock Holmes apparently is killed by "Odin Reichenbach" and his body is lost in the (Delaware) river below the footwalk.
- Gus Johnson's remark for a 3-point basket by Seton Hall Basketball guard Myles Powell
- The Hot Zone season 2, episode 3
- the 2023 film The Sweet East as part of a road trip scene from Baltimore to a protest in New Jersey
- YouTuber Miles in Transit refers to the bridge as "beacon of light, beacon of hope" in his videos

== Gallery ==
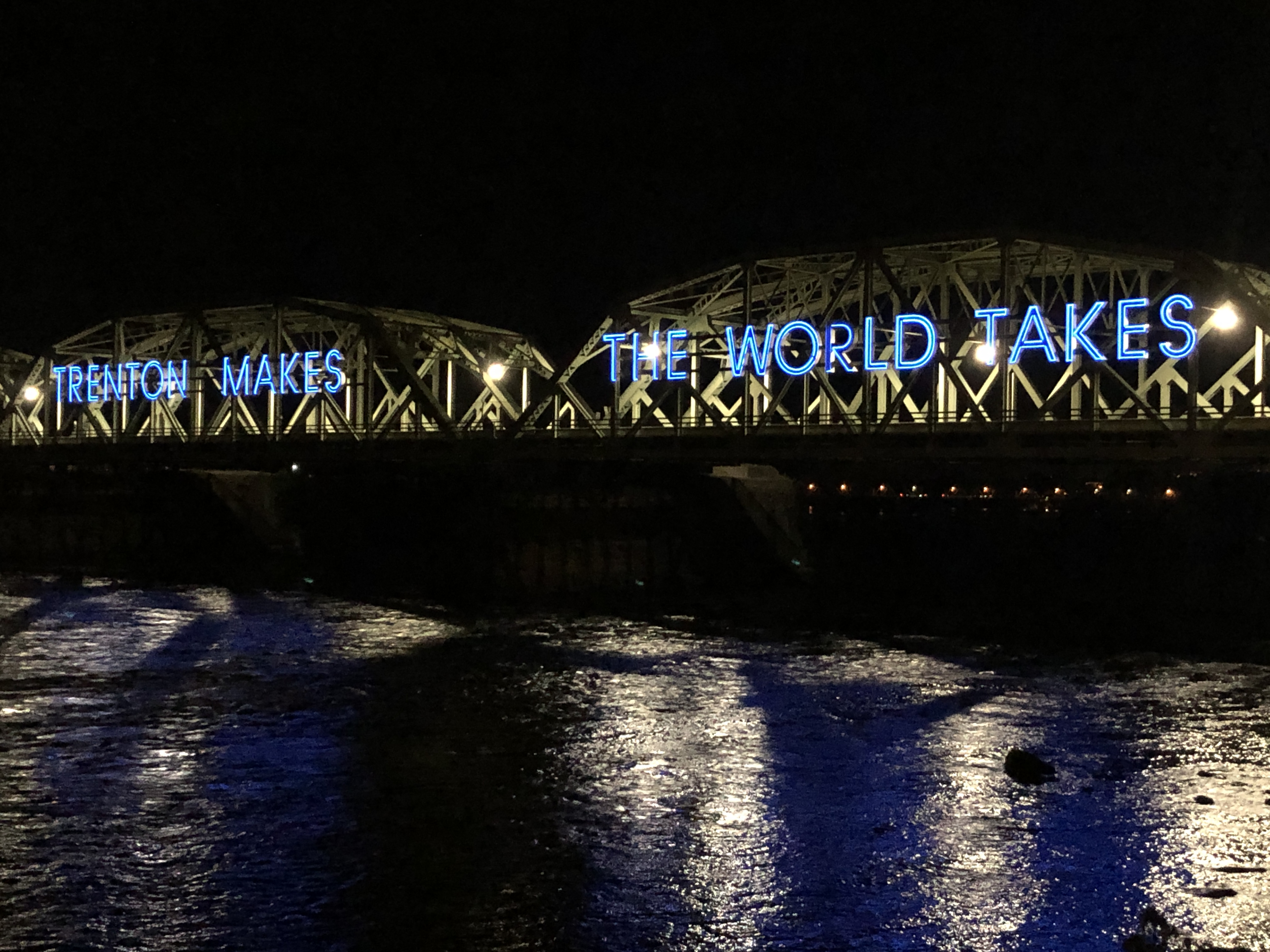
The bridge at night, from the side of Route 29 southbound, Trenton

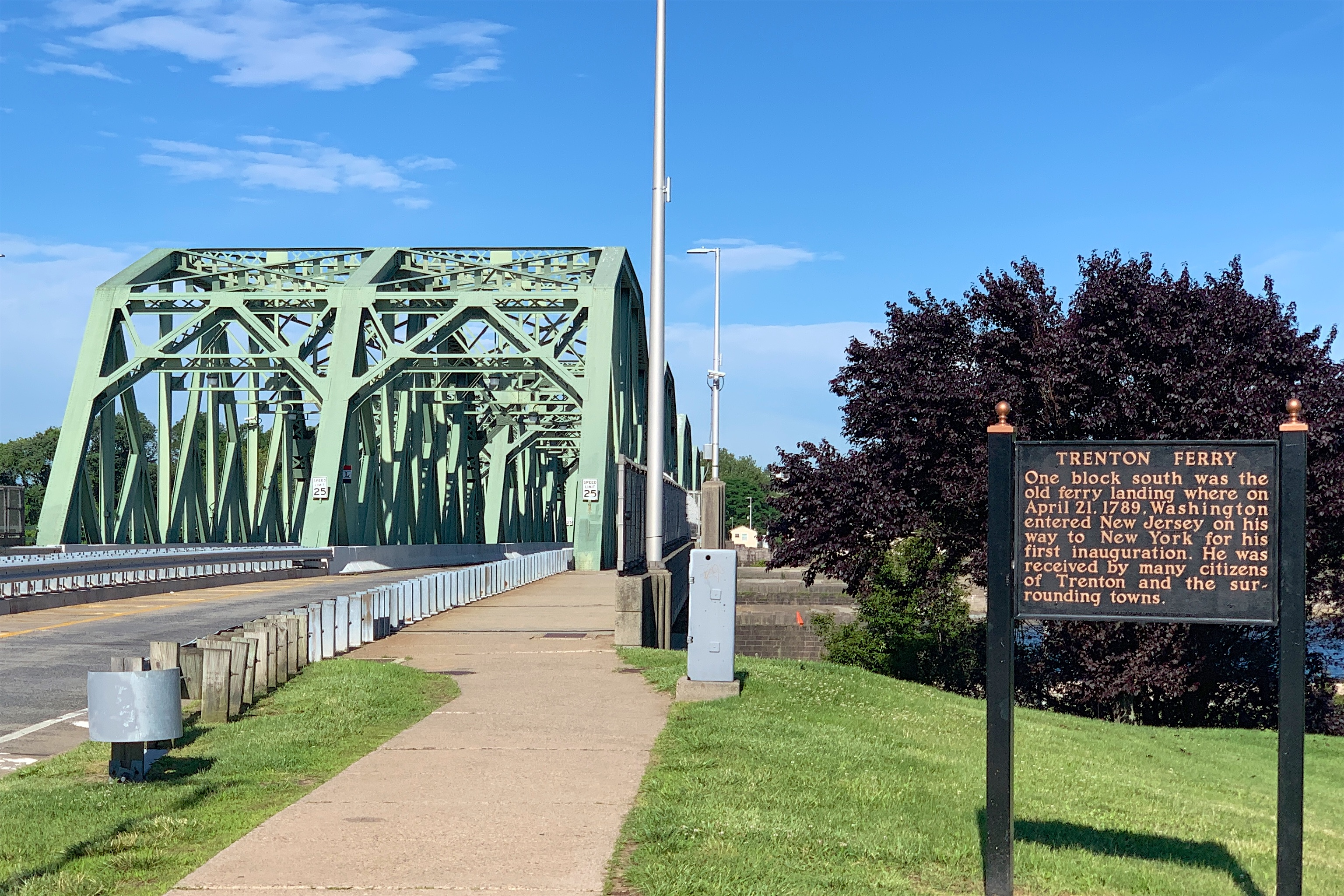
Information sign by the bridge entrance describing the Trenton Ferry and George Washington's reception at Trenton on April 21, 1789.
