= Henry Iba Award =

College basketball coach award

- Awarded for: the best men's college basketball head coach in NCAA Division I competition
- Country: United States
- Presented by: USBWA

History
- First award: 1959
- Most recent: Dusty May, Michigan
- Website: Official website

The Henry Iba Award (also called the USBWA National Coach of the Year Award) was established in 1959 to recognize the best men's NCAA Division I basketball coach by the U.S. Basketball Writers Association (USBWA). Five nominees are presented and the individual with the most votes receives the award, which is presented in conjunction with the Final Four. The award is named after Henry Iba, who coached at Oklahoma State from 1934 to 1970. He won the NCAA championship in both 1945 and 1946, and coached the U.S. Olympic Teams to two gold medals in 1964 and 1968. The award is presented at the Oscar Robertson Trophy Breakfast on the Friday before the Final Four.

Legendary UCLA Bruins coach John Wooden has the most all-time selections with seven. Nine other coaches have won multiple Henry Iba Awards, with only Tony Bennett of Washington State and Virginia receiving it more than twice. Bennett is also one of only two coaches to have received the award at more than one program, joining Kelvin Sampson who was honored at Oklahoma and Houston. The schools with the second-most winners are Michigan, Ohio State and St. John's (each receiving three), with Michigan being the only school to have had three separate coaches win the award (Johnny Orr, Juwan Howard, Dusty May).

== Key ==
Coach (X)	Denotes the number of times the coach has been awarded the Henry Iba Award at that point
W, L, W %	Total wins, total losses, win percentage
Finish	National postseason tournament result
C	Denotes national championship season

== Winners ==
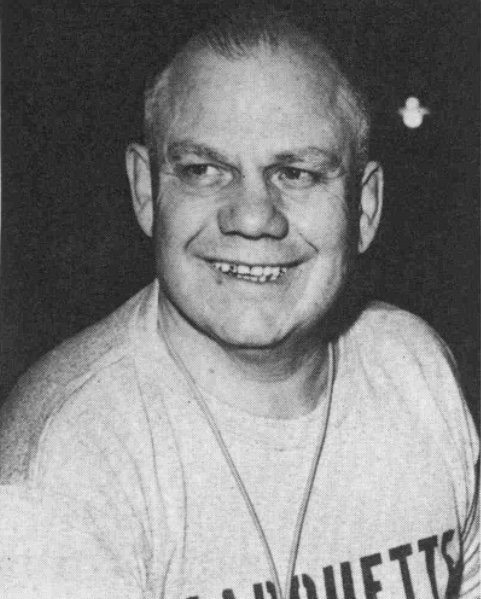
Eddie Hickey, Marquette, 1959

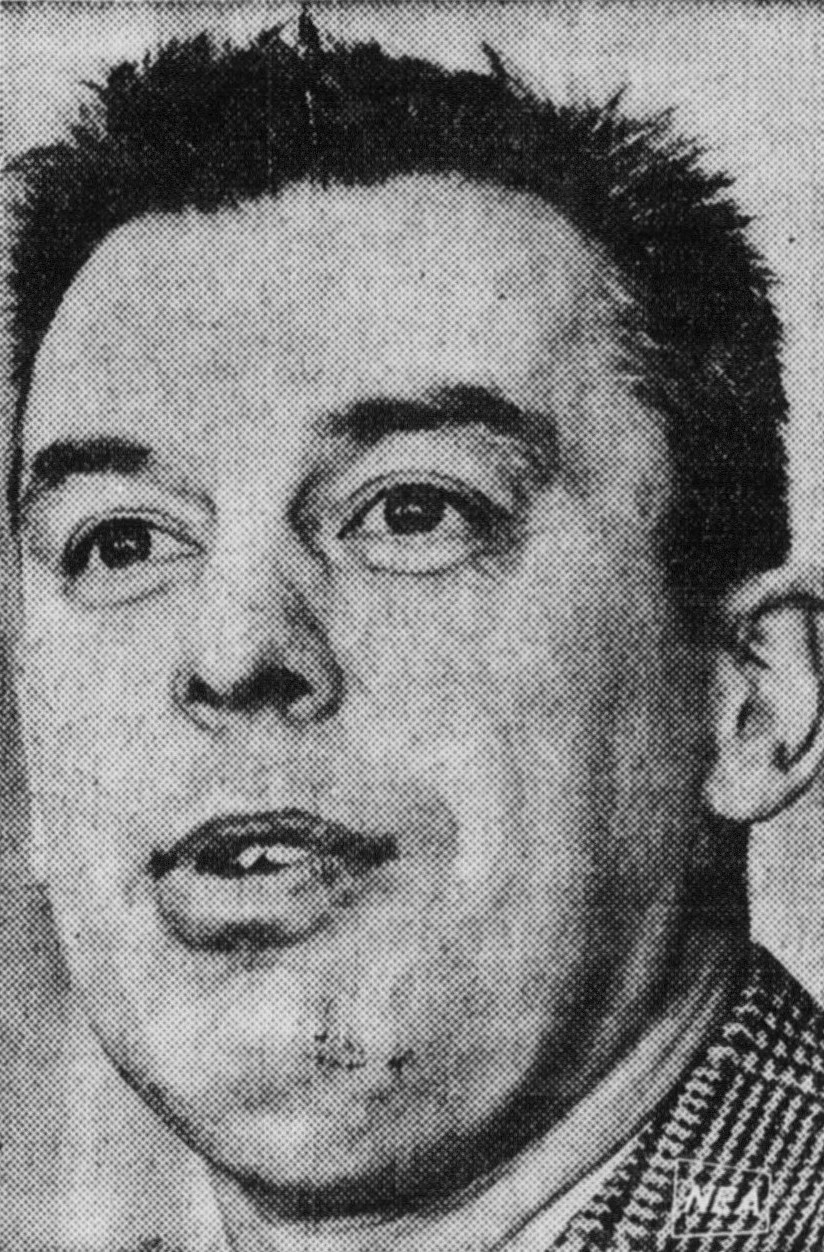
Butch van Breda Kolff, Princeton, 1965

Norm Sloan, NC State, 1974

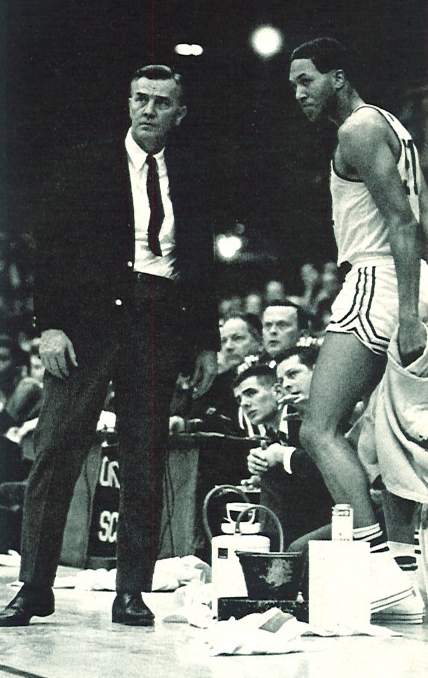
Ralph Miller, Oregon State, 1981

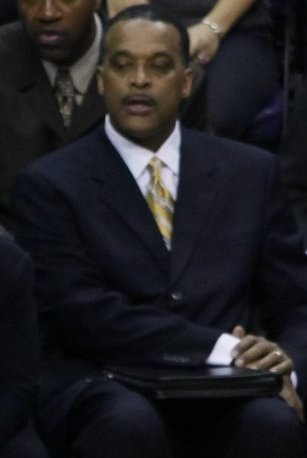
Randy Ayers, Ohio State, 1991

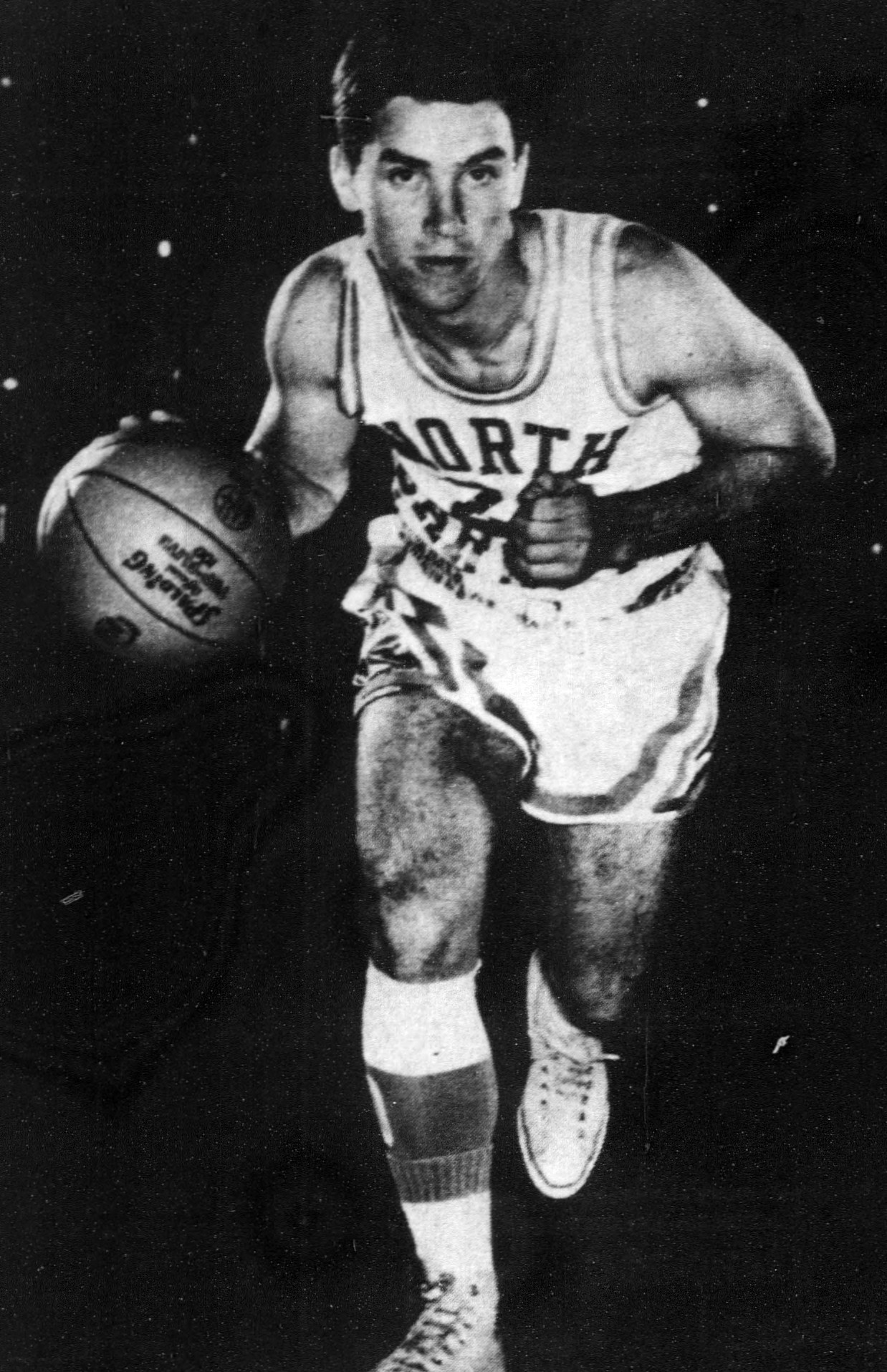
Eddie Fogler, Vanderbilt, 1993

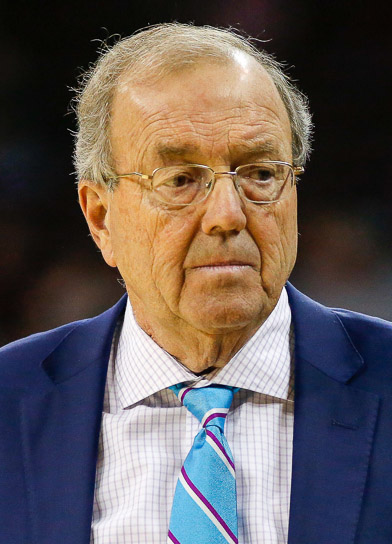
Cliff Ellis, Auburn, 1999

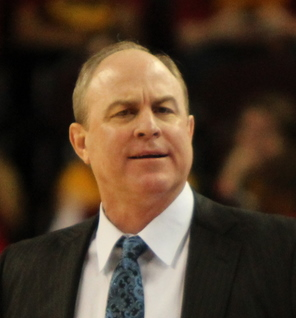
Ben Howland, Pittsburgh, 2002

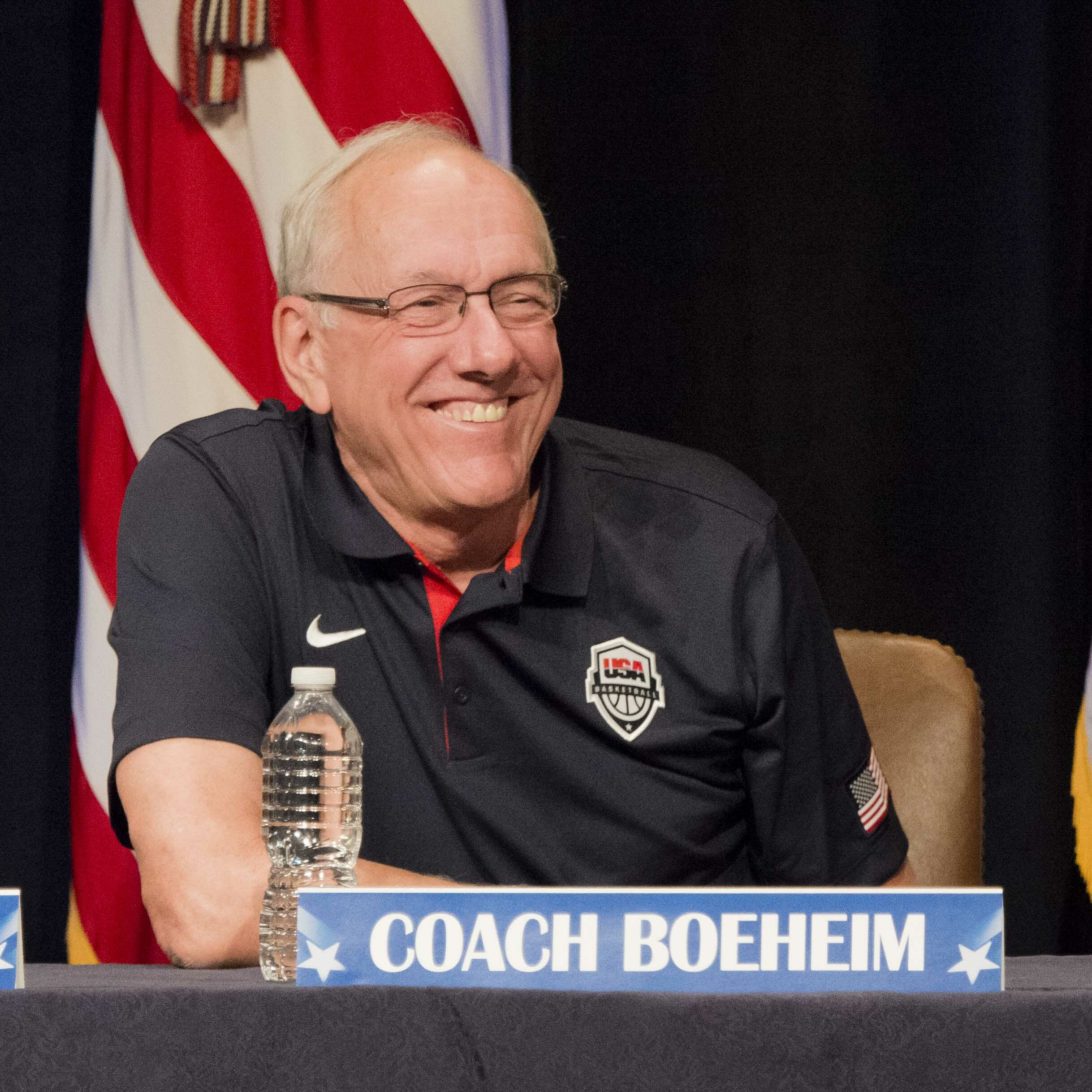
Jim Boeheim, Syracuse, 2010

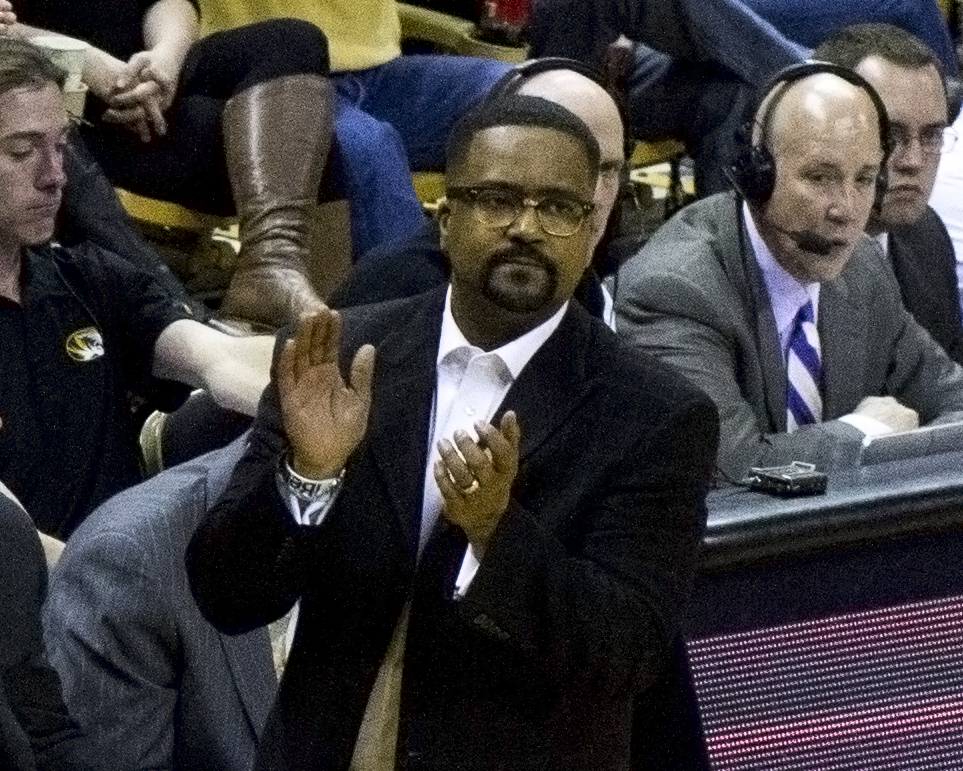
Frank Haith, Missouri, 2012

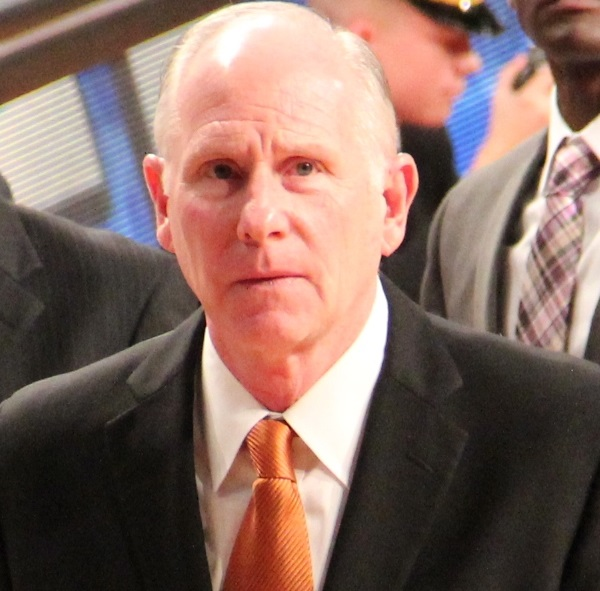
Jim Larrañaga, Miami (Florida), 2013

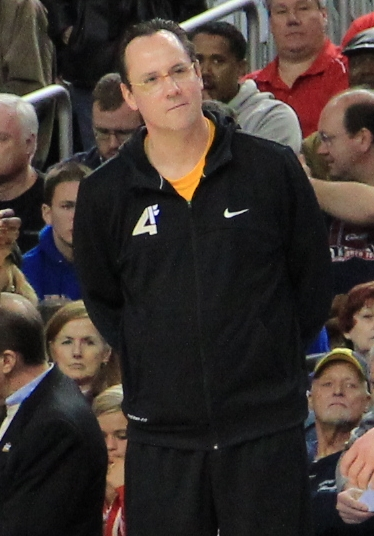
Gregg Marshall, Wichita State, 2014

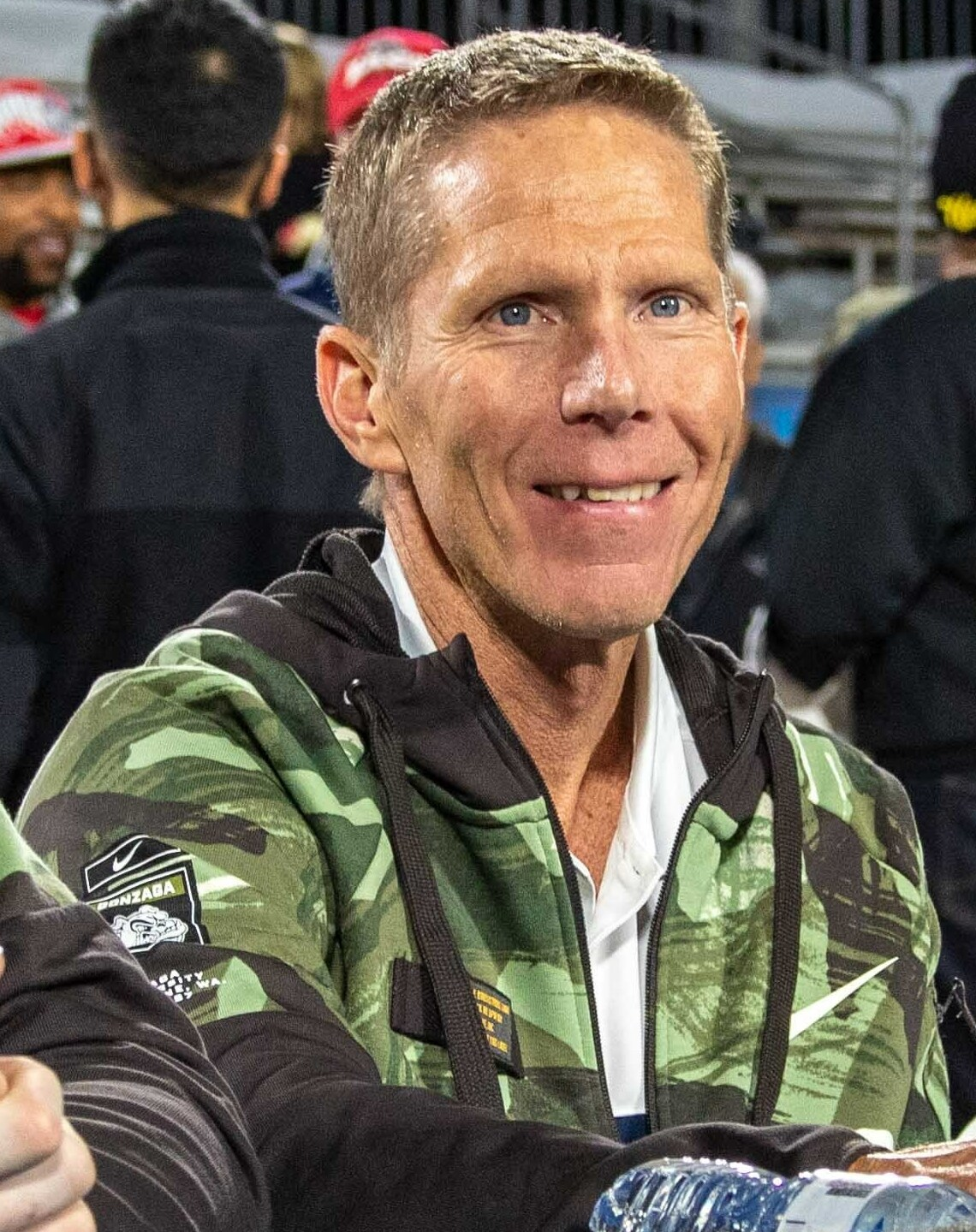
Mark Few, Gonzaga, 2017

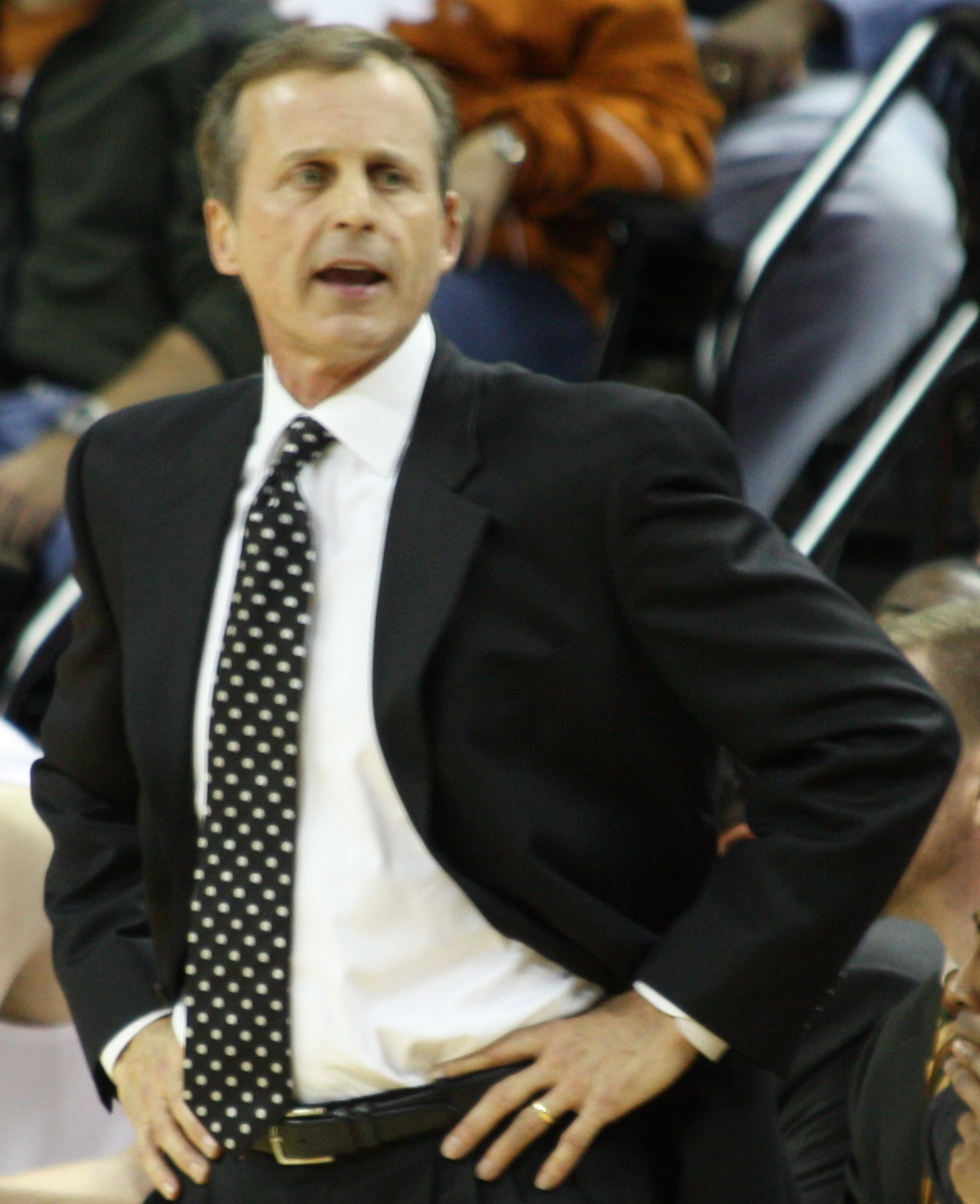
Rick Barnes, Tennessee, 2019

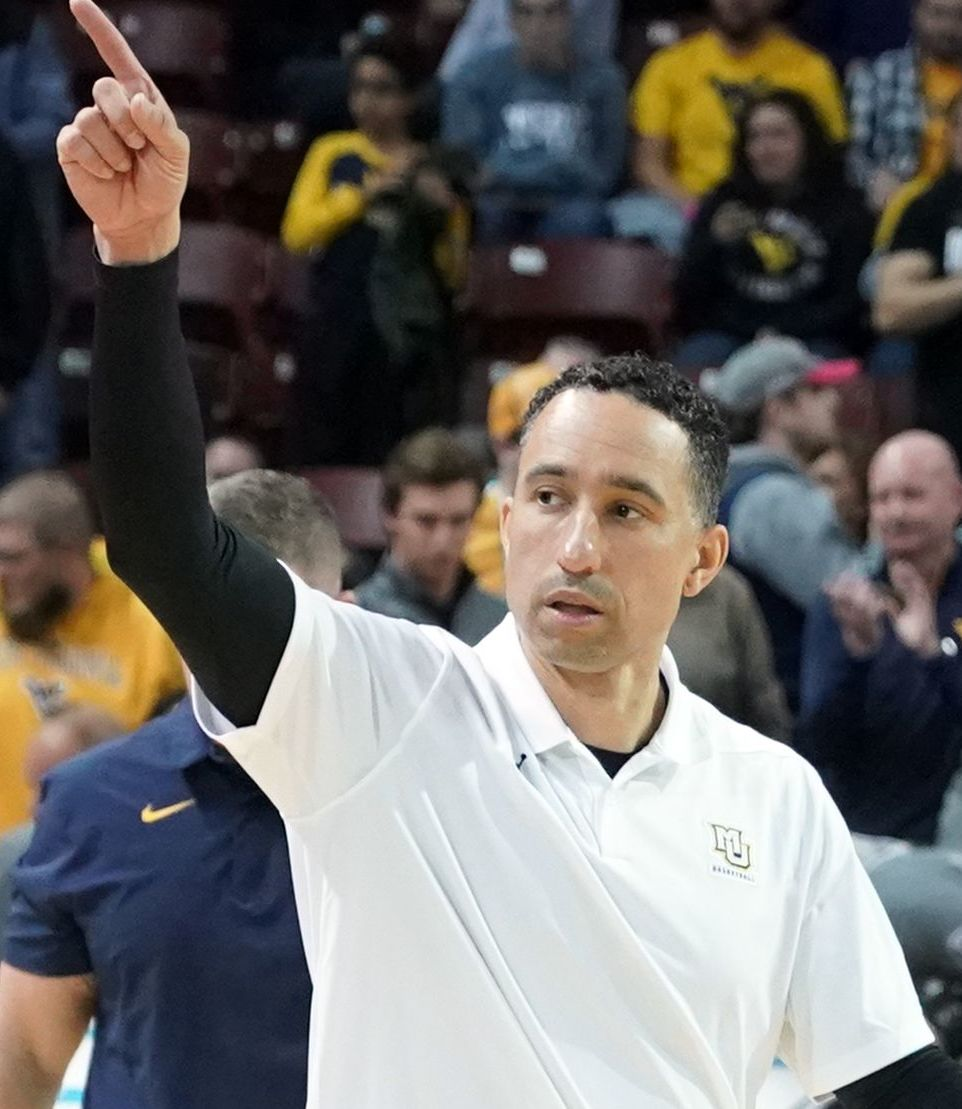
Shaka Smart, Marquette, 2023

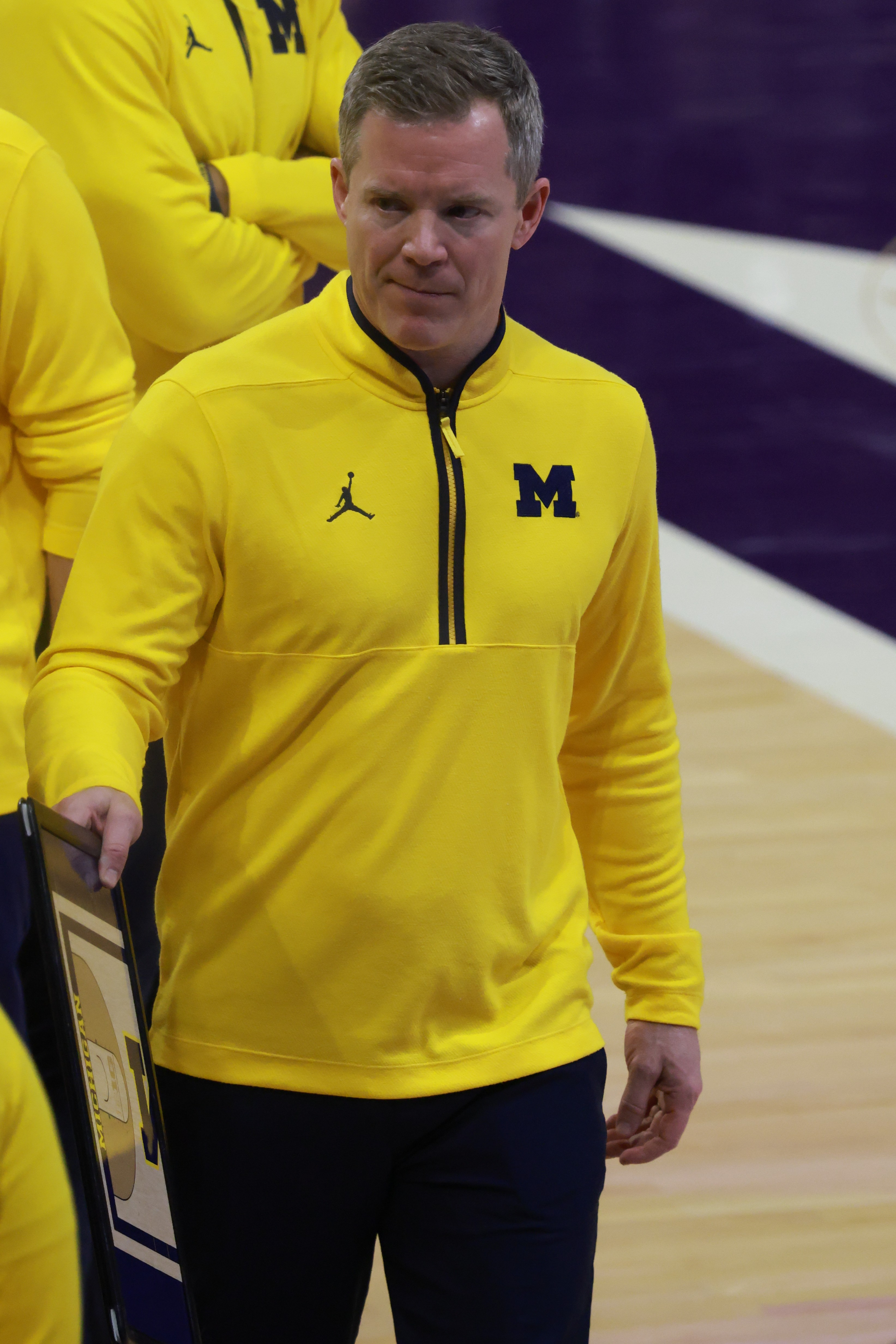
Dusty May, Michigan, 2026

Season	Coach	School	W	L	W %	Finish	Reference
1958–59	Eddie Hickey	Marquette	23	6	.793	NCAA Sweet Sixteen	
1959–60	Pete Newell	California	28	2	.933	NCAA runners-up	
1960–61	Fred Taylor	Ohio State	27	1	.964	NCAA runners-up	
1961–62	Fred Taylor (2)	Ohio State	26	2	.929	NCAA runners-up	
1962–63	Ed Jucker	Cincinnati	26	2	.929	NCAA runners-up	
1963–64	John Wooden	UCLA	30	0	1.000	NCAA champion^{C}	
1964–65	Butch van Breda Kolff	Princeton	23	6	.793	NCAA Third Place	
1965–66	Adolph Rupp	Kentucky	27	2	.931	NCAA runners-up	
1966–67	John Wooden (2)	UCLA	30	0	1.000	NCAA champion^{C}	
1967–68	Guy Lewis	Houston	31	2	.939	NCAA Final Four	
1968–69	John Wooden (3)	UCLA	29	1	.967	NCAA champion^{C}	
1969–70	John Wooden (4)	UCLA	28	2	.933	NCAA champion^{C}	
1970–71	John Wooden (5)	UCLA	29	1	.967	NCAA champion^{C}	
1971–72	John Wooden (6)	UCLA	30	0	1.000	NCAA champion^{C}	
1972–73	John Wooden (7)	UCLA	30	0	1.000	NCAA champion^{C}	
1973–74	Norm Sloan	NC State	30	1	.968	NCAA champion^{C}	
1974–75	Bob Knight	Indiana	31	1	.969	NCAA Elite Eight	
1975–76	Johnny Orr	Michigan	25	7	.781	NCAA runners-up	
1976–77	Eddie Sutton	Arkansas	26	2	.929	NCAA first round	
1977–78	Ray Meyer	DePaul	27	3	.900	NCAA Elite Eight	
1978–79	Dean Smith	North Carolina	23	6	.793	NCAA second round	
1979–80	Ray Meyer (2)	DePaul	26	2	.929	NCAA second round	
1980–81	Ralph Miller	Oregon State	26	2	.929	NCAA second round	
1981–82	John Thompson	Georgetown	30	7	.811	NCAA runners-up	
1982–83	Lou Carnesecca	St. John's	28	5	.848	NCAA Sweet Sixteen	
1983–84	Gene Keady	Purdue	22	7	.759	NCAA second round	
1984–85	Lou Carnesecca (2)	St. John's	31	4	.886	NCAA Final Four	
1985–86	Dick Versace	Bradley	32	3	.914	NCAA second round	
1986–87	John Chaney	Temple	32	4	.889	NCAA second round	
1987–88	John Chaney (2)	Temple	32	2	.941	NCAA Elite Eight	
1988–89	Bob Knight (2)	Indiana	27	8	.771	NCAA Sweet Sixteen	
1989–90	Roy Williams	Kansas	30	5	.857	NCAA second round	
1990–91	Randy Ayers	Ohio State	27	4	.871	NCAA Sweet Sixteen	
1991–92	Perry Clark	Tulane	22	9	.710	NCAA second round	
1992–93	Eddie Fogler	Vanderbilt	28	6	.824	NCAA Sweet Sixteen	
1993–94	Charlie Spoonhour	Saint Louis	23	6	.793	NCAA first round	
1994–95	Kelvin Sampson	Oklahoma	23	9	.719	NCAA first round	
1995–96	Gene Keady (2)	Purdue	26^{[a]}	6^{[a]}	.813^{[a]}	NCAA second round	
1996–97	Clem Haskins^{[b]}	Minnesota^{[b]}	31^{[b]}	4^{[b]}	.886^{[b]}	NCAA Final Four^{[b]}	
1997–98	Tom Izzo	Michigan State	22	8	.733	NCAA Sweet Sixteen	
1998–99	Cliff Ellis	Auburn	29	4	.879	NCAA Sweet Sixteen	
1999–00	Larry Eustachy	Iowa State	32	5	.865	NCAA Elite Eight	
2000–01	Al Skinner	Boston College	27	5	.844	NCAA second round	
2001–02	Ben Howland	Pittsburgh	29	6	.829	NCAA Sweet Sixteen	
2002–03	Tubby Smith	Kentucky	32	4	.889	NCAA Elite Eight	
2003–04	Phil Martelli	Saint Joseph's	30	2	.938	NCAA Elite Eight	
2004–05	Bruce Weber	Illinois	37	2	.949	NCAA runners-up	
2005–06	Roy Williams (2)	North Carolina	23	8	.742	NCAA second round	
2006–07	Tony Bennett	Washington State	26	8	.765	NCAA second round	
2007–08	Keno Davis	Drake	28	5	.848	NCAA first round	
2008–09	Bill Self	Kansas	27	8	.771	NCAA Sweet Sixteen	
2009–10	Jim Boeheim	Syracuse	30	5	.857	NCAA Sweet Sixteen	
2010–11	Mike Brey	Notre Dame	27	7	.794	NCAA round of 32^{[c]}	
2011–12	Frank Haith	Missouri	30	5	.857	NCAA round of 64	
2012–13	Jim Larrañaga	Miami (Florida)	29	7	.806	NCAA Sweet Sixteen	
2013–14	Gregg Marshall	Wichita State	35	1	.972	NCAA round of 32	
2014–15	Tony Bennett (2)	Virginia	30	4	.882	NCAA round of 32	
2015–16	Chris Mack	Xavier	28	6	.824	NCAA round of 32	
2016–17	Mark Few	Gonzaga	37	2	.949	NCAA runners-up	
2017–18	Tony Bennett (3)	Virginia	31	3	.912	NCAA round of 64	
2018–19	Rick Barnes	Tennessee	31	6	.838	NCAA Sweet Sixteen	
2019–20	Anthony Grant	Dayton	29	2	.935	N/A^{[d]}	
2020–21	Juwan Howard	Michigan	23	5	.821	NCAA Elite Eight	
2021–22	Tommy Lloyd	Arizona	33	4	.892	NCAA Sweet Sixteen	
2022–23	Shaka Smart	Marquette	29	7	.806	NCAA round of 32	
2023–24	Kelvin Sampson (2)	Houston	32	5	.865	NCAA Sweet Sixteen	
2024–25	Rick Pitino	St. John's	31	5	.861	NCAA round of 32	
2025–26	Dusty May	Michigan	37	3	.925	NCAA champion^{C}	

- ^{a} In 1999, the NCAA Division I Committee on Infractions ruled that Purdue had violated laws involving recruiting, extra benefits, and ethical conduct, as well as several secondary violations in the women's basketball program. Their 26–6 overall record (15–3 conference) retroactively forfeited 18 wins and vacated 2 games for using an ineligible player.
- ^{b} Due to the numbers and severity of NCAA violations that had surfaced, Clem Haskins and the Minnesota men's basketball season records and awards were nullified, giving them a 0–0 record and no official recognition for having gotten to the 1997 Final Four.
- ^{c} The NCAA men's tournament expanded to 68 teams starting in 2011, with the last four teams earning bids into the tournament set in competition with one another via "First Four" play-in games. The 'first round' then became more commonly referred to as 'round of 64' for specificity.
- ^{d} The COVID-19 pandemic caused the 2019–20 season to be canceled prior to any national postseason tournaments occurring.
