= Morrisville–Trenton Railroad Bridge =

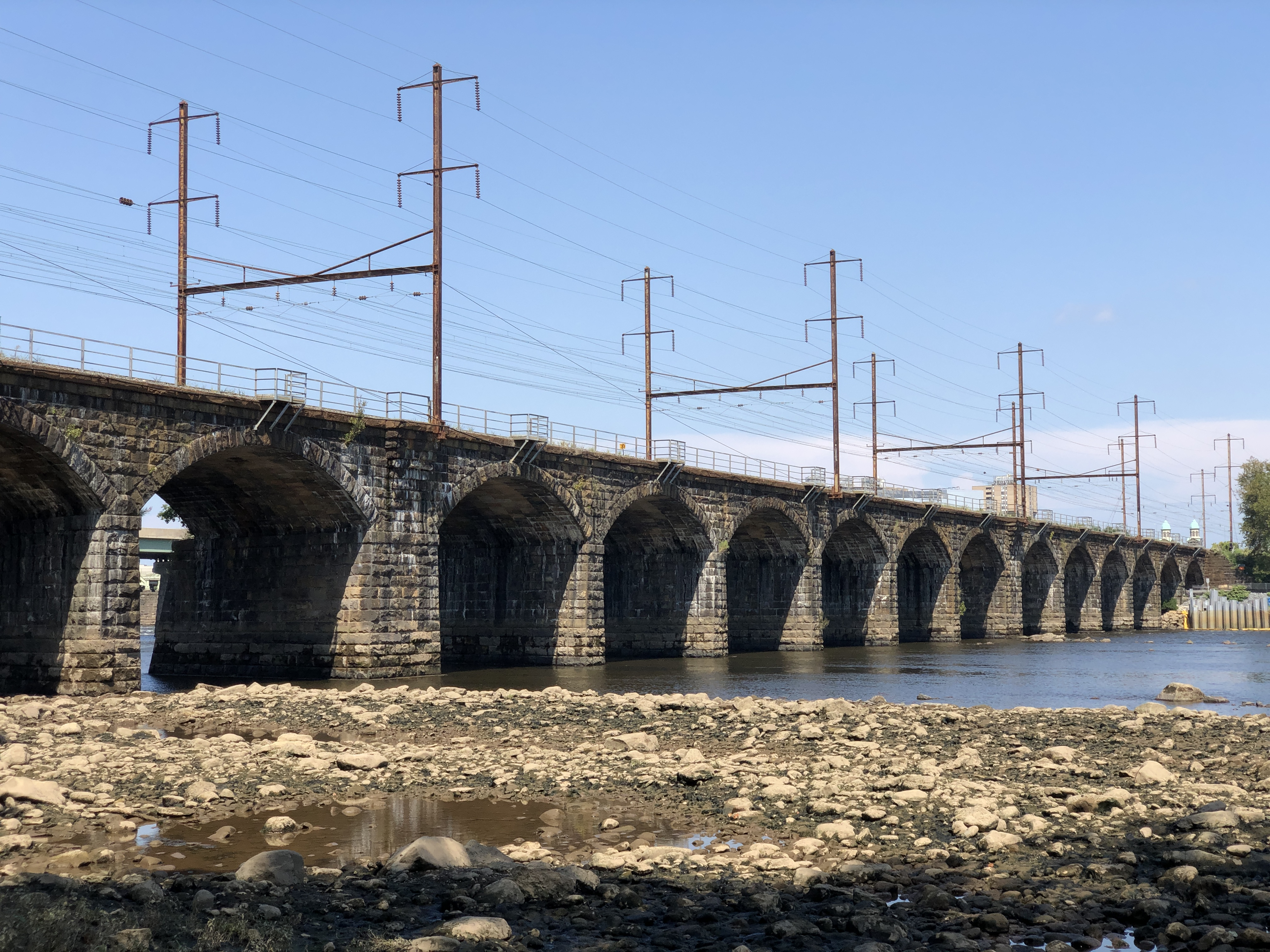
- The bridge at low tide
- Coordinates: 40.2082°N 74.7672°W
- Carries: Amtrak Northeast Corridor, SEPTA Trenton Line, and NJ Transit Northeast Corridor Line (non-revenue/deadhead to NJT's Morrisville Yard)
- Crosses: Delaware River
- Locale: Morrisville, Pennsylvania, and Trenton, New Jersey
- Maintained by: Amtrak

Characteristics
- Design: Stone arch bridge
- Total length: 1,220 feet (370 m)
- Width: 54 feet (16 m)
- Longest span: 60 feet (18 m)

History
- Opened: August 23, 1903

Location
- Interactive map of Morrisville–Trenton Railroad Bridge

The Morrisville–Trenton Railroad Bridge is a rail bridge across the Delaware River between Morrisville, Pennsylvania and Trenton, Mercer County, New Jersey, United States.

The bridge carries the Amtrak Northeast Corridor trains and SEPTA Trenton Line as well as non-revenue trains for NJ Transit's Northeast Corridor Line that have terminated at the Trenton Transit Center bound for the Morrisville Yard.

== History ==
A series of Pennsylvania Railroad (PRR) predecessors operated trains across the nearby Lower Trenton Bridge from 1834 until 1903, when PRR completed a grade separation project through Trenton, including this stone arch bridge on a new alignment.

In 1953, the Morrisville approach to the bridge was blocked when eight cars of an eighty-three-car freight train operated by the Pennsylvania Railroad derailed at 11 p.m. on January 13. No one was injured in the incident; however, four of the derailed cars were described in news reports as "smashed across the four tracks," along with a steel pole that "was knocked across the tracks, tearing down the lines feeding current to express and local trains." As a result, the railroad's main line to New York was inoperable for five hours, forcing the cancellation or delay of more than twenty passenger trains.

== See also ==
- List of bridges documented by the Historic American Engineering Record in New Jersey
- List of bridges documented by the Historic American Engineering Record in Pennsylvania
- List of bridges on the National Register of Historic Places in New Jersey
- List of crossings of the Delaware River
- National Register of Historic Places listings in Mercer County, New Jersey
- National Register of Historic Places listings in Bucks County, Pennsylvania
