= Summerseat (Morrisville, Pennsylvania) =

Historic house in Pennsylvania, United States

- U.S. National Register of Historic Places
- U.S. National Historic Landmark
- Pennsylvania state historical marker
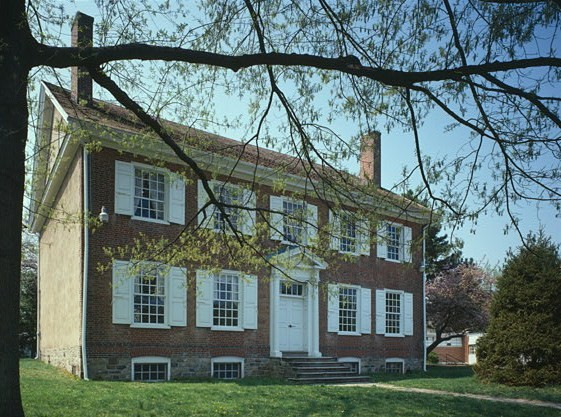
- Summerseat

- Location within Pennsylvania Location within the United States
- Location: Clymer St. and Morris Ave., Morrisville, Pennsylvania
- Coordinates: 40°12′29.1″N 74°46′46.5″W
- Area: 2 acres (0.81 ha)
- Built: c. 1770
- Architectural style: Georgian
- NRHP reference No.: 71000685

Significant dates
- Added to NRHP: July 17, 1971
- Designated NHL: July 17, 1965
- Designated PHMC: January 27, 1949

Summerseat, also known as the George Clymer House and Thomas Barclay House, is a historic house museum at Hillcrest and Legion Avenues in Morrisville, Bucks County, Pennsylvania. Built about 1765, it is the only house known to have been owned by two signers of the United States Declaration of Independence, Founding Fathers George Clymer and Robert Morris, and as a headquarters of General George Washington during the American Revolutionary War. The house is now managed by the Morrisville Historical Society, which offers tours. It was designated a National Historic Landmark in 1965.

== Description and history ==
Summerseat is located west of the central business district of Morrisville, sharing a property with Patriot's Park at the junction of Hillcrest and Legion Avenues. It is a 2 1/2-story masonry structure, built out of a combination of brick and stone. Its front and sides are brick, while the rear wall is stone. The main facade faces east, and is five bays wide, with a center entrance framed by pilasters and a fully pedimented gable. The interior follows a traditional center-hall plan, with four rooms on each floor. The interior retains some original features, despite having had non-residential uses.

The house was built about 1765 by Adam Hoops , and was owned by his son in law Thomas Barclay at the end of 1776, when George Washington occupied it as a military headquarters during the dark days of the New York and New Jersey campaign of the American Revolutionary War. After the war the house was purchased by Robert Morris, a signer of the Declaration of Independence, and the principal financier of the war effort. Morris fell upon financial hard times owing to failed real estate speculation, and sold the house in 1806 to George Clymer, another signer of the Declaration.

The house was restored in 1931 and converted for use as a school administrative building in 1935. Summerseat is now owned and operated as a house museum by the Historic Morrisville Society. The house is open to the public for tours on the first Saturday of each month from 10:00 a.m. to 1:00 p.m. Admission is $7.00 per person, children under the age 12 are free.

== See also ==
- List of Washington's Headquarters during the Revolutionary War
- List of National Historic Landmarks in Pennsylvania
- National Register of Historic Places listings in Bucks County, Pennsylvania
