= Morrisville Borough School District =

School district in Pennsylvania

The Morrisville Borough School District is a public school district serving the Philadelphia suburb of Morrisville in Bucks County. It features three schools: Grandview Elementary (grades K-2), Morrisville Intermediate (grades 3–5), and Morrisville Middle/Senior High School (grades 6–12).

== Demographics ==
The school district serves only about 800 students. It has investigated merging with another district or contracting with them to provide services on the basis of tuition.

The district is about 72% White, 14% Black, 2% Asian and 8% Hispanic. Press reports indicate that all of the district's teachers are White.
