= Calhoun Street Bridge =

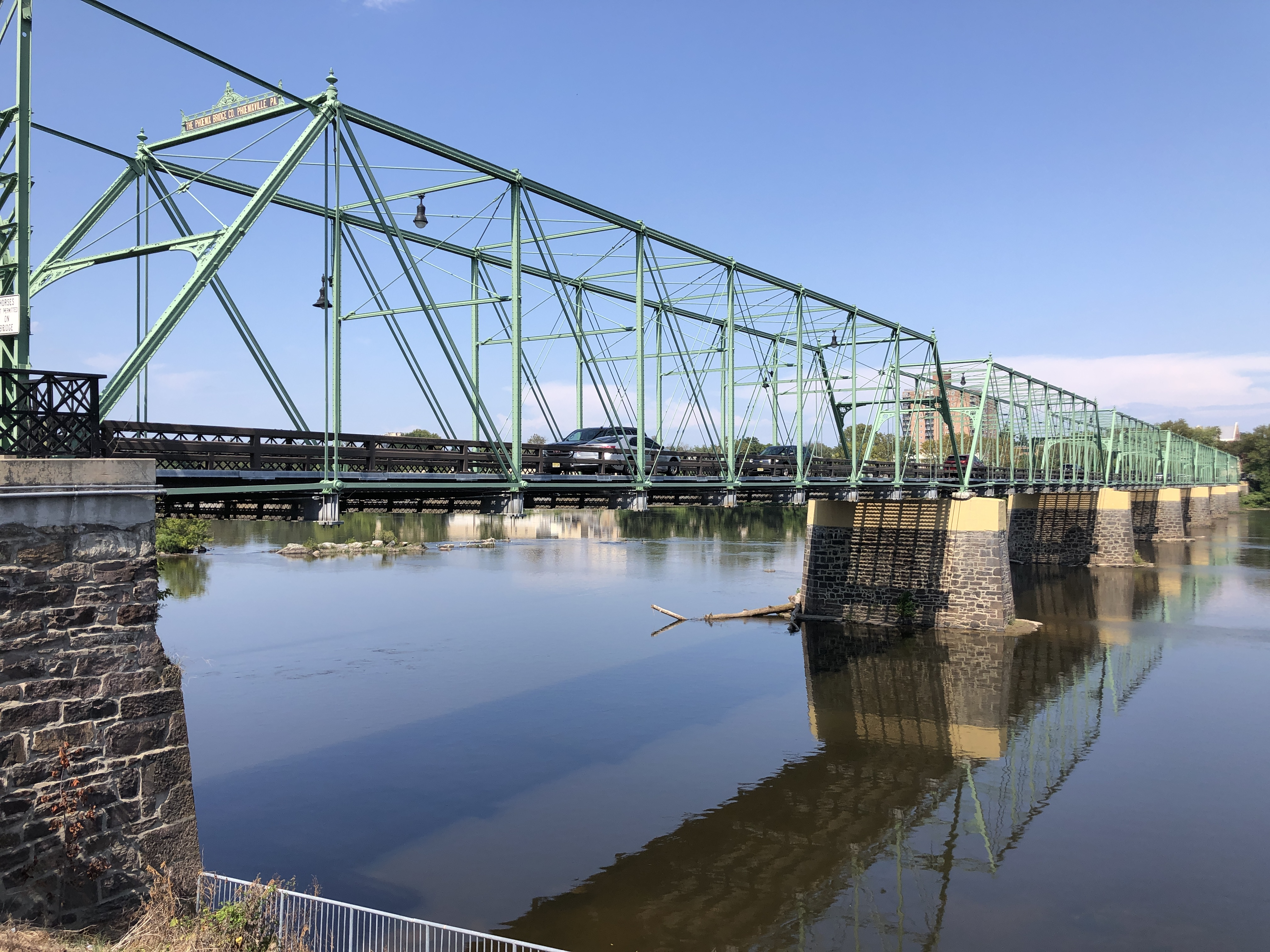
- Bridge seen from Morrisville, Pennsylvania
- Coordinates: 40°13′11″N 74°46′42″W
- Carries: Calhoun Street, Calhoun Street Extension
- Crosses: Delaware River
- Locale: Morrisville, Pennsylvania and Trenton, New Jersey
- Official name: Calhoun Street Toll Supported Bridge
- Maintained by: Delaware River Joint Toll Bridge Commission

Characteristics
- Design: Pin-connected Pratt through truss bridge
- Material: Iron
- Total length: 1,274 feet (388.3 m)
- No. of spans: 7
- Load limit: 3 short tons (2.7 t)
- Clearance above: 8 feet (2.4 m)

History
- Opened: October 24, 1884

Statistics
- Daily traffic: 18,000
- Toll: None (3-ton weight limit)
- Trenton City/Calhoun Street Bridge
- U.S. National Register of Historic Places
- New Jersey Register of Historic Places
- NRHP reference No.: 75001621
- NJRHP No.: 1761

Significant dates
- Added to NRHP: November 20, 1975
- Designated NJRHP: September 10, 1975

Location
- Interactive map of Calhoun Street Bridge

The Calhoun Street Toll Supported Bridge (also known as the Trenton City Bridge) is a historic bridge connecting Calhoun Street in Trenton, New Jersey across the Delaware River to East Trenton Avenue in Morrisville, Bucks County, Pennsylvania, United States. It was constructed by the Phoenix Bridge Company of Phoenixville, Pennsylvania, in 1884, replacing an earlier bridge built in 1861. The bridge was part of the Lincoln Highway until 1920 (when the highway was moved to the free Lower Trenton Bridge), and was later connected to Brunswick Circle by the Calhoun Street Extension as part of a bypass of downtown Trenton. Before 1940, trolleys of the Trenton-Princeton Traction Company, utilized this bridge to cross into Pennsylvania. The bridge is owned by the Delaware River Joint Toll Bridge Commission, and is maintained with tolls from other bridges. It carries Light vehicle traffic, and streetcars until 1940. It was added to the National Register of Historic Places on November 20, 1975, for its significance in industry and transportation.

On May 24, 2010, the bridge completely closed to vehicular and pedestrian traffic to undergo much-needed renovations including truss repair and repainting, deck replacement, and repair of approaches. The rehabilitation project was completed October 8, 2010, and the bridge was rededicated in a ceremony on October 12.

== Restrictions ==
Currently, the bridge is limited to 3 short tons (2.7 t) at 15 miles per hour (24 km/h) with a clearance of 8 feet (2.4 m).

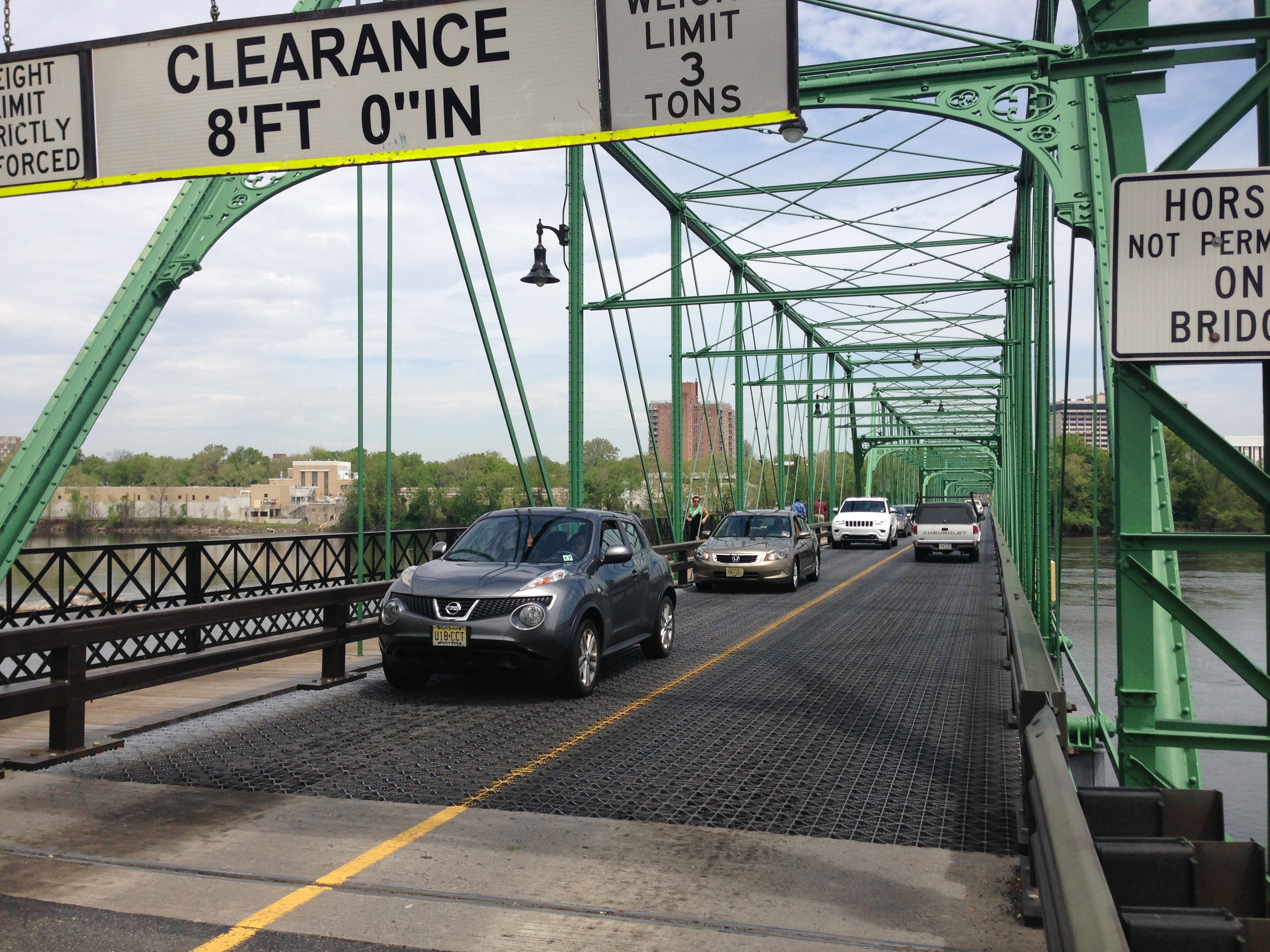
View of truss-work showing ornamental details from the western end of the bridge

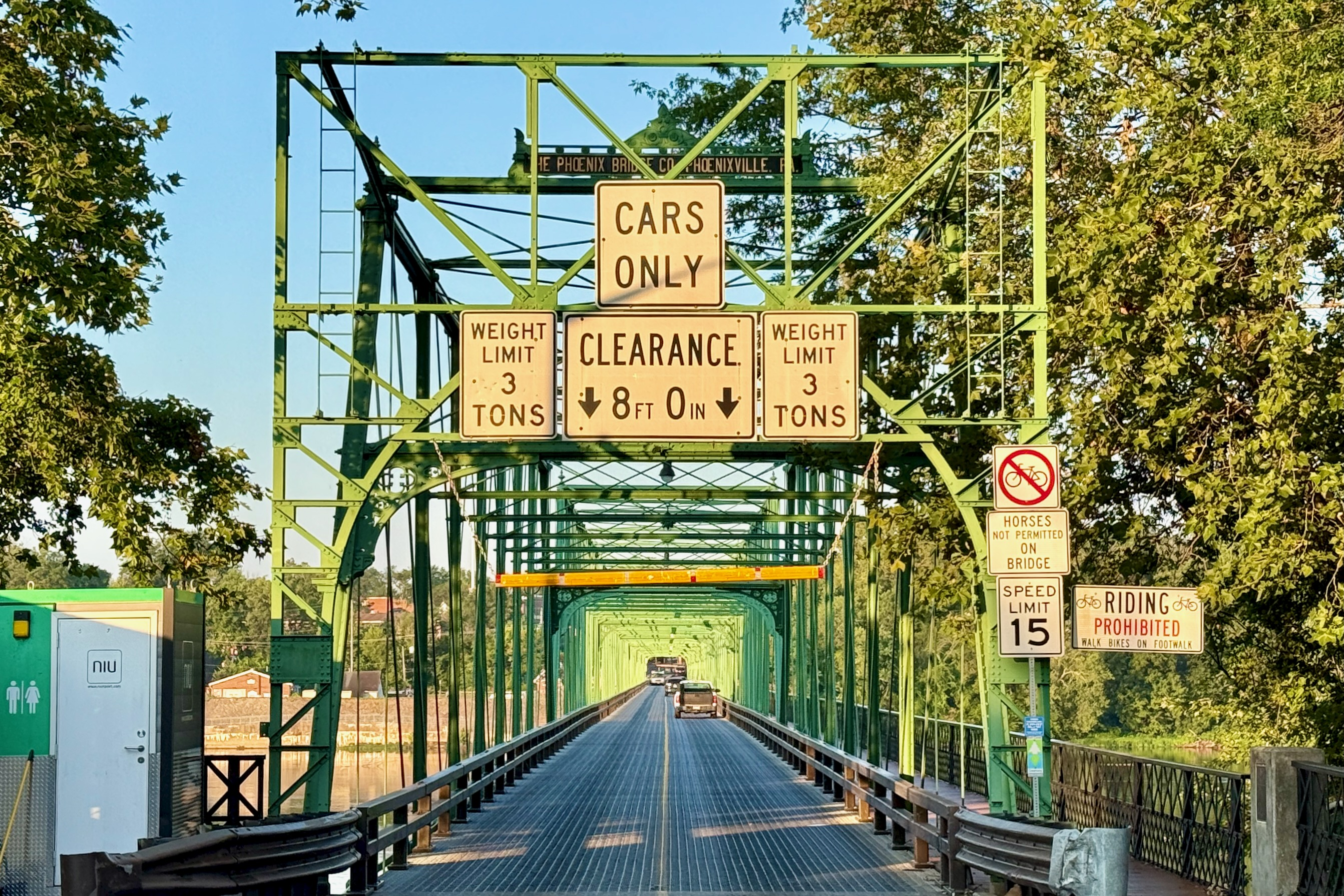
Approach from Trenton

== See also ==
- List of crossings of the Delaware River
- National Register of Historic Places listings in Mercer County, New Jersey
- National Register of Historic Places listings in Bucks County, Pennsylvania
