= Morrisville Yard =

Coordinates: 40.1947°N 74.7909°W

The Morrisville Yard is an American rail yard that is used by New Jersey Transit rail operations for trains on its Northeast Corridor Line. It is located roughly two miles west of the New Jersey state capital, Trenton, in Falls Township, Bucks County, Pennsylvania, and is accessible via the Morrisville-Trenton Railroad Bridge on the Delaware River.

Conrail maintains a classification yard at its western end.

== History and notable features ==
The Morrisville Yard was originally a freight yard for the Pennsylvania Railroad, and later Penn Central. New Jersey Transit (NJT) took over partial control of the site and commissioned STV to expand and modernize it in phases. The facility is equipped with repair and maintenance shops, train washing facilities, communications offices, and crew quarters.

In 2004, NJT opened a new facility at the site to replace the haphazard collection of storage tracks around the Trenton Station complex known as the Barracks Yard. Another expansion of the yard was opened in 2008. This not only increased the absolute number of trains that could be stored at the end of the line, but also reduced the number of relay movements needed to position trains at the correct platform at the Trenton Transit Center.

Capacity was also increased by a flying junction so that trains no longer needed to cross all four of the mainline tracks to access their storage tracks.

== See also ==
- Trenton Cutoff
- SMS Rail Lines
- Sunnyside Yard
