= Graystones Forest =

Coordinates: 40.2181°N 74.7863°W

Graystones Forest is the location in Morrisville, Pennsylvania, United States, where William Penn met with members of the Lenape Indian tribe under a white oak tree in 1682 to negotiate the first land-purchase survey in Pennsylvania.
