= Michael Lenox =

American academic (born 1971)

Michael J. Lenox
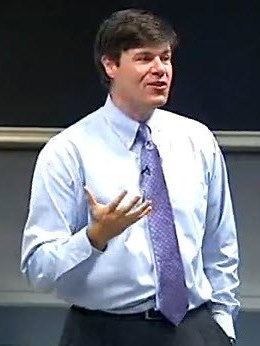
- Lenox in 2012
- Born: February 23, 1971 (age 55); Morrisville, Pennsylvania, United States

Academic background
- Education: B.S., M.S. systems engineering, (University of Virginia); Ph.D. in Technology Management and Policy, (Massachusetts Institute of Technology (MIT))

Academic work
- Discipline: Business administration

Michael J. Lenox (born February 23, 1971) is an American strategist and professor of business administration at the Darden School of the University of Virginia, particularly known for his work on business strategy, technology strategy, corporate sustainability and industry self-regulation. Lenox was also a visiting professor at Oxford University, Harvard University and Stanford University. He is a contributor at Forbes magazine.

== Biography ==
Born in Morrisville, Pennsylvania, son to James P. Lenox and Virginia Lynn Lenox. Michael received a B.S. in systems engineering from University of Virginia in 1993, a M.S. in Systems Engineering from University of Virginia in 1994 and a Ph.D. in Technology Management and Policy from Massachusetts Institute of Technology (MIT) in 1999.

He taught previously at New York University (NYU) Stern School of Business and at Duke University Fuqua School of Business, and is currently the Tayloe Murphy Professor of Business at the Darden School of Business, University of Virginia and has served as the school's Senior Associate Dean and Chief Strategy Officer since 2016.

== Business strategy ==
Lenox has been teaching and studying strategy for over 20 years. Besides teaching both MBAs and executive MBAs from Fuqua School of Business and from Darden School of Business, Lenox is one of the faculty pioneers to teach business strategy in a MOOC (Massive Online Open Course). His most popular course, Foundations of Business Strategy, explores the theory and frameworks that provide the foundations of a successful business strategy. He gave this course in different platforms such as Udemy and Coursera.

His most recent work in business strategy is his book Strategy in the Digital Age- Mastering Digital Transformation. Additional books include: The Decarbonization Imperative- Transforming the Global Economy by 2050, Can Business Save the Earth?- Innovating Our Way to Sustainability, and The Strategist's Toolkit, co-authored with his colleague Jared D. Harris.

== Recognitions ==
Lenox was recognized, in 2009, as a Faculty Pioneer by the Aspen Institute for his work on business and sustainability. He was recognized as the top strategy professor under 40 by the Strategic Management Society in 2009. In 2011, he was named one of the top 40 business professors under 40 by Poets & Quants.
