= Gershom Craft House =

Historic house in Pennsylvania, United States

- U.S. National Register of Historic Places
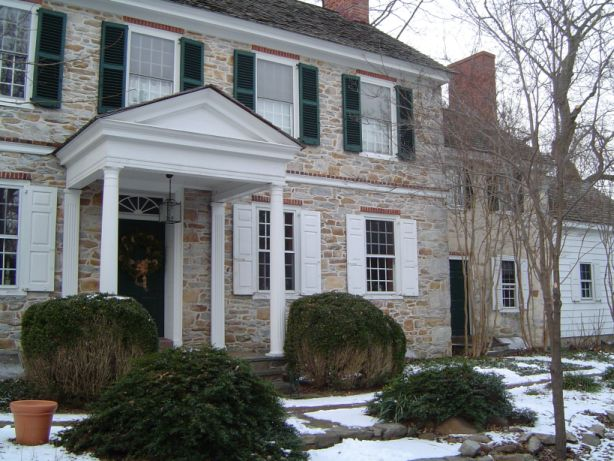

- Location within Pennsylvania Location within the United States
- Location: Morrisville, Pennsylvania
- Coordinates: 40°12′8″N 74°47′25″W
- Built: 1806
- Architectural style: Federal
- NRHP reference No.: 86002892
- Added to NRHP: October 16, 1986

The Gershom Craft House (c. 1806–1808), also known as Pomona Farm, is a historical house in Bucks County, Pennsylvania, across the Delaware River about 2 miles from Trenton, New Jersey.

== Design ==
The house is as excellent an example of Federal style architecture as is found in Bucks County, combining the vernacular with Federalist ideals of proportion and decoration. The four main rooms of the house are each approximately 18 feet (5.5 m) square by nine feet high. Ninety percent of the woodwork and hardware in the house are original.

== History ==
Its original owner and builder, Trenton businessman Gershom Craft, built the house and surrounding 84-acre (340,000 m^{2}) farm as a summer home. Craft planted over 100 different species of fruits on the farm and named it after the Roman goddess of fruit trees, Pomona. Craft was influential in business and politics at the local level, owning a Federalist newspaper and being involved in the Trenton Water Works and Trenton Banking Company.

The farm was subdivided in 1911 and annexed to the Borough of Morrisville, Bucks County, Pennsylvania. It is one of only two houses in Morrisville on the National Register, the other being Summerseat, host to General George Washington during the days leading up to the Battle of Trenton. The Gershom Craft House now sits on a heavily landscaped .75-acre (3,000 m^{2}) lot. Also included on the property are a smokehouse, carriage house, and wood frame shop.

The property was added to the National Register of Historic Places of the United States in 1986.
