= 1987–88 Rhode Island Rams men's basketball team =

American college basketball season

1987–88 Rhode Island Rams men's basketball

NCAA tournament, Sweet Sixteen
- Conference: Atlantic 10 Conference
- Record: 28–7 (14–4 A-10)
- Head coach: Tom Penders (2nd season)
- Assistant coach: Matt Brady (1st season)
- Home arena: Keaney Gymnasium

1987–88 Atlantic 10 men's basketball standings
	Conf.				Overall
Team	W		L	PCT	W		L	PCT
No. 1 Temple †	18	–	0	1.000	32	–	2	.941
Rhode Island	14	–	4	.778	28	–	7	.800
West Virginia	12	–	6	.667	18	–	14	.563
Saint Joseph's	9	–	9	.500	15	–	14	.517
Penn State	9	–	9	.500	13	–	14	.481
George Washington	7	–	11	.389	13	–	15	.464
St. Bonaventure	7	–	11	.389	13	–	15	.464
Duquesne	6	–	12	.333	11	–	21	.344
UMass	5	–	13	.278	10	–	17	.370
Rutgers	3	–	15	.167	7	–	22	.241
† 1988 Atlantic 10 Tournament winner Rankings from AP Poll

The 1987–88 Rhode Island Rams men's basketball team represented the University of Rhode Island as a member of the Atlantic 10 Conference during the 1987–88 college basketball season. The team was led by second-year head coach Tom Penders and played their home games at Keaney Gymnasium. They finished the season 28–7, 14–4 in A-10 play and lost in the championship game of the 1988 Atlantic 10 men's basketball tournament. Rhode Island was invited to the 1988 NCAA tournament as No. 11 seed in the East region and make the school's first run to the Sweet Sixteen. In the opening round, they upset No. 6 seed Missouri, and followed that by knocking off No. 3 seed Syracuse in the round of 32. In the East regional semifinal, the Rams narrowly lost to Duke, 73–72. To date, this season marks one of only two appearances by the Rams in the Sweet Sixteen of an NCAA Tournament (1998).

== Roster ==
1987–88 Rhode Island Rams men's basketball team
Players
Coaches

Pos.	#	Name	Height	Weight	Year	Hometown
G	10	Carlton Owens	6 ft 0 in (1.83 m)	—	Sr
G	22	Tom Garrick	6 ft 2 in (1.88 m)	—	Sr
F/C	24	Kenny Green	6 ft 8 in (2.03 m)	—	So
C	50	Bonzie Colson	6 ft 9 in (2.06 m)	—	Jr
G	16	Jim Christian	6 ft 3 in (1.91 m)	—	Sr

Head coach

- Tom Penders

Assistant coach(es)

- Matt Brady (Siena)

Legend

- (C) Team captain
- (S) Suspended
- (I) Ineligible
- (W) Walk-on
- Injured
- Current redshirt

== Schedule and results ==
Date time, TV	Rank^{#}	Opponent^{#}	Result	Record	Site (attendance) city, state
Regular season
Nov 27, 1987*		vs. The Citadel; Investors Classic	W 113–85	1–0	University Hall; Charlottesville, Virginia
Nov 28, 1987*		at Virginia; Investors Classic	W 76–73	2–0	University Hall; Charlottesville, Virginia
Dec 1, 1987*		at New Hampshire	W 96–67	3–0	Lundholm Gym; Durham, New Hampshire
Dec 9, 1987*		Northeastern	W 95–81	4–0	Keaney Gymnasium; Kingston, Rhode Island
Dec 12, 1987		at No. 11 Temple	L 66–75	4–1 (0–1)	McGonigle Hall; Philadelphia, Pennsylvania
Dec 19, 1987*		at Providence	W 92–70	5–1	Providence Civic Center; Providence, Rhode Island
Dec 23, 1987*		at San Diego State	W 77–76 ^{OT}	6–1	San Diego Sports Arena; San Diego, California
Dec 26, 1987*		at U.S. International	W 101–90	7–1	The Pavilion; San Diego, California
Dec 30, 1987*		vs. Fordham; Chaminade Tournament	L 53–59	7–2	Neal S. Blaisdell Center; Honolulu, Hawaii
Dec 31, 1987*		vs. Manhattan; Chaminade Tournament	W 94–80	8–2	Neal S. Blaisdell Center; Honolulu, Hawaii
Jan 1, 1988*		vs. BYU-Hawaii	W 94–80	9–2	George Q. Cannon Activities Center; Honolulu, Hawaii
Jan 7, 1988		Penn State	W 83–80	10–2 (1–1)	Keaney Gymnasium; Kingston, Rhode Island
Jan 9, 1988		at Saint Joseph's	W 99–80	11–2 (2–1)	Hagan Arena; Philadelphia, Pennsylvania
Jan 12, 1988*		at Brown	W 104–91	12–2	Marvel Gymnasium; Providence, Rhode Island
Jan 16, 1988		at Rutgers	W 84–71	13–2 (3–1)	Louis Brown Athletic Center; Piscataway, New Jersey
Jan 18, 1988		at George Washington	W 92–61	14–2 (4–1)	Charles E. Smith Center; Washington, D.C.
Jan 23, 1988		Saint Joseph's	W 91–85	15–2 (5–1)	Keaney Gymnasium; Kingston, Rhode Island
Jan 26, 1988		at UMass	W 101–78	16–2 (6–1)	Curry Hicks Cage; Amherst, Massachusetts
Jan 28, 1988*		vs. George Washington	W 84–76 ^{OT}	17–2 (7–1)	Providence Civic Center; Providence, Rhode Island
Jan 31, 1988		No. 6 Temple	L 70–77	17–3 (7–2)	Keaney Gymnasium; Kingston, Rhode Island
Feb 4, 1988		vs. Rutgers	W 111–92	18–3 (8–2)	Providence Civic Center; Providence, Rhode Island
Feb 7, 1988		at West Virginia	W 74–71	19–3 (9–2)	WVU Coliseum; Morgantown, West Virginia
Feb 9, 1988		at Duquesne	L 93–98	19–4 (9–3)	Civic Arena; Pittsburgh, Pennsylvania
Feb 13, 1988		St. Bonaventure	W 93–73	20–4 (10–3)	Keaney Gymnasium; Kingston, Rhode Island
Feb 18, 1988		Duquesne	L 89–100	20–5 (10–4)	Keaney Gymnasium; Kingston, Rhode Island
Feb 20, 1988		vs. West Virginia	W 75–60	21–5 (11–4)	Madison Square Garden; New York, New York
Feb 25, 1988		at Penn State	W 77–69	22–5 (12–4)	Rec Hall; University Park, Pennsylvania
Feb 27, 1988		at St. Bonaventure	W 93–79	23–5 (13–4)	Reilly Center; St. Bonaventure, New York
Mar 2, 1988		UMass	W 87–73	24–5 (14–4)	Keaney Gymnasium; Kingston, Rhode Island
Atlantic 10 tournament
Mar 7, 1988*		vs. Rutgers; Quarterfinals	W 104–73	25–5	WVU Coliseum; Morgantown, West Virginia
Mar 8, 1988*		at West Virginia; Semifinals	W 65–63	26–5	WVU Coliseum; Morgantown, West Virginia
Mar 9, 1988*		vs. No. 1 Temple; Championship game	L 63–68	26–6	WVU Coliseum; Morgantown, West Virginia
NCAA tournament
Mar 17, 1988*	(11 E)	vs. (6 E) Missouri; First round	W 87–80	27–6	Dean Smith Center; Chapel Hill, North Carolina
Mar 19, 1988*	(11 E)	vs. (3 E) No. 9 Syracuse; Second round	W 97–94	28–6	Dean Smith Center; Chapel Hill, North Carolina
Mar 24, 1988*; CBS	(11 E)	vs. (2 E) No. 5 Duke; East Regional semifinal – Sweet Sixteen	L 72–73	28–7	Brendan Byrne Arena (19,591); East Rutherford, New Jersey
*Non-conference game. ^{#}Rankings from AP poll. (#) Tournament seedings in parentheses. E=East. All times are in EST.
