= John Chaney (basketball, born 1932) =

American basketball player and coach (1932–2021)

Biographical details
- Born: January 21, 1932; Jacksonville, Florida, U.S.
- Died: January 29, 2021 (aged 89); Philadelphia, Pennsylvania, U.S.

Playing career
- 1951–1955: Bethune–Cookman
- 1955–1963: Sunbury Mercuries
- 1963–1966: Williamsport Billies

Coaching career (HC unless noted)
- 1963–1966: William L. Sayre Junior HS (PA)
- 1966–1972: Simon Gratz HS (PA)
- 1972–1982: Cheyney State
- 1982–2006: Temple

Head coaching record
- Overall: 741–312 (college)

Accomplishments and honors

Championships
- NCAA Division II tournament (1978); 5 PSAC regular season (1973, 1976, 1978, 1980, 1982); 7 PSAC tournament (1973, 1976–1980, 1982); 7 A-10 regular season (1984, 1987, 1988, 1990, 1998–2000); 6 A-10 tournament (1985, 1987, 1988, 1990, 2000, 2001)

Awards
- Division II National Coach of the Year (1978); 2x Henry Iba Award (1987, 1988); NABC Coach of the Year (1988); AP Coach of the Year (1988); UPI Coach of the Year (1988); 5x A-10 Coach of the Year (1984, 1985, 1987, 1988, 2000)
- Basketball Hall of Fame; Inducted in 2001
- College Basketball Hall of Fame; Inducted in 2006

John Chaney (January 21, 1932 – January 29, 2021) was an American college basketball coach, best known for his success at Temple University from 1982 through 2006. He was inducted into the Naismith Memorial Basketball Hall of Fame in 2001 and the National Collegiate Basketball Hall of Fame in 2006.

== Early life and playing career ==
Chaney was born in Jacksonville, Florida, but grew up in Philadelphia. He began his career after graduating from Bethune–Cookman College and spending some time in the Eastern Professional Basketball League, first with the Sunbury Mercuries from 1955 to 1963 and Williamsport Billies from 1963 to 1966.

== Coaching career ==
Chaney first became a basketball coach in 1963 at William L. Sayre Junior High School (now high school) at 58th and Walnut Street in Philadelphia. His teams had a 59–9 win–loss record in three seasons. Inheriting a one-win team in 1966 at Simon Gratz High School in Philadelphia, Chaney compiled a 63–23 record in six seasons.

Chaney's first collegiate position was at Cheyney State College, where he coached the Cheyney Wolves in the National Collegiate Athletic Association's (NCAA) Division II. At Cheyney, Chaney had a 232–56 record. Cheyney won the 1978 NCAA Division II men's basketball tournament.

After a decade at the school, Chaney moved on to Temple University in 1982, where he coached the Temple Owls in NCAA Division I. Chaney built a reputation as a tough coach who always demanded excellence on and off the court. He was well known for his early-morning practices, match-up zone defense, tough non-conference scheduling, and winning basketball teams. He won the Henry Iba Award, given annually to the best college basketball coach by the United States Basketball Writers Association, in 1987 and 1988.

On February 13, 1994, Chaney threatened to kill then-University of Massachusetts Amherst coach John Calipari at a post-game news conference, where Calipari was speaking at a lectern. Chaney entered the conference mid-speech, calling him an "Italian son-of-a-bitch," accusing Calipari of manipulating the referees. When Calipari attempted to respond to the accusations, Chaney yelled, "Shut up...!", and proceeded to charge the stage, before being stopped by security. While being held back, Chaney shouted, "When I see you, I'm gonna kick your ass!" As security restrained Chaney, he repeatedly yelled, "I'll kill you!" and angrily admitted telling his players to "knock your fucking kids in the mouth." Chaney received a one-game suspension for the incident. The two coaches later reconciled. Chaney praised Calipari's coaching ability and defended him over the Derrick Rose controversy at the University of Memphis.

On December 20, 2004, during a win over Princeton, Chaney became the fifth active coach and 19th all-time to appear on the sidelines for 1,000 games, joining Lou Henson (New Mexico State, Illinois), Bob Knight (Army, Indiana, Texas Tech), Eddie Sutton (Creighton, Arkansas, Kentucky, Oklahoma State, San Francisco), and Hugh Durham (Florida State, Georgia, Jacksonville).

In 2005, Chaney ordered backup forward Nehemiah Ingram into the game to commit hard fouls against Big 5 rival Saint Joseph's in response to what he thought were several missed calls by the referees. After the game Chaney admitted to "sending a message" and stated "I'm going to send in what we used to do years ago, send in the goons." John Bryant of Saint Joseph's suffered a fractured arm as a result of an intentional foul. Following the incident, he suspended himself for one game, and upon hearing the severity of the injury, the university suspended him for the final three games of the regular season. Chaney self-extended the suspension to that year's Atlantic 10 Conference men's basketball tournament.

On March 13, 2006, Chaney announced his retirement from coaching at a press conference, effective after Temple's play in the National Invitation Tournament (NIT). Fran Dunphy was named Chaney's successor following the season. Chaney was later inducted into the Big 5 Hall of Fame, which recognizes the best in Philadelphia's college basketball history. Chaney won a total of 741 career games. He took Temple to the NCAA tournament 17 times. His 1987–88 Owls team entered the NCAA tournament ranked #1 in the country, and he reached the Elite Eight on five occasions. In 2001, Chaney was elected to the Naismith Memorial Basketball Hall of Fame.

== Personal life ==
Chaney and his wife Jeanne (died 2026) had a daughter, Pamela, and two sons, Darryl and John Jr. Chaney died on January 29, 2021, at the age of 89.

== Head coaching record ==
Record table
Season	Team	Overall	Conference	Standing	Postseason
Cheyney State Wolves (Pennsylvania State Athletic Conference) (1972–1982)
1972–73	Cheyney State	23–5	12–2	1st (Eastern)	NCAA College Regional third place
1973–74	Cheyney State	19–7	11–3	T–1st (Eastern)	
1974–75	Cheyney State	16–9	9–5	2nd (Eastern)	
1975–76	Cheyney State	24–5	11–1	1st (Eastern)	NCAA Division II Elite Eight
1976–77	Cheyney State	20–8	10–2	1st (Eastern)	NCAA Division II Elite Eight
1977–78	Cheyney State	27–2	12–0	1st (Eastern)	NCAA Division II champion
1978–79	Cheyney State	24–7	10–2	1st (Eastern)	NCAA Division II Third Place
1979–80	Cheyney State	23–5	12–0	1st (Eastern)	NCAA Division II Regional third place
1980–81	Cheyney State	21–8	9–3	T–1st (Eastern)	NCAA Division II Regional third place
1981–82	Cheyney State	28–3	11–1	1st (Eastern)	NCAA Division II Elite Eight
Cheyney State:		225–59 (.792)	107–19 (.849)		
Temple Owls (Atlantic 10 Conference) (1982–2006)
1982–83	Temple	14–15	5–9	3rd (East)	
1983–84	Temple	26–5	18–0	1st	NCAA Division I Second Round
1984–85	Temple	25–6	15–3	2nd	NCAA Division I Second Round
1985–86	Temple	25–6	15–3	T–2nd	NCAA Division I Second Round
1986–87	Temple	32–4	17–1	1st	NCAA Division I Second Round
1987–88	Temple	32–2	18–0	1st	NCAA Division I Elite Eight
1988–89	Temple	18–12	15–3	2nd	NIT First Round
1989–90	Temple	20–11	15–3	1st	NCAA Division I First Round
1990–91	Temple	24–10	13–5	2nd	NCAA Division I Elite Eight
1991–92	Temple	17–13	11–5	2nd	NCAA Division I First Round
1992–93	Temple	20–13	8–6	T–2nd	NCAA Division I Elite Eight
1993–94	Temple	23–8	12–4	2nd	NCAA Division I Second Round
1994–95	Temple	19–11	10–6	T–2nd	NCAA Division I First Round
1995–96	Temple	20–13	12–4	2nd (East)	NCAA Division I Second Round
1996–97	Temple	20–11	10–6	4th (East)	NCAA Division I Second Round
1997–98	Temple	21–9	13–3	1st (East)	NCAA Division I First Round
1998–99	Temple	24–11	13–3	1st (East)	NCAA Division I Elite Eight
1999–00	Temple	27–6	14–2	1st (East)	NCAA Division I Second Round
2000–01	Temple	24–13	12–4	T–2nd	NCAA Division I Elite Eight
2001–02	Temple	19–15	12–4	T–1st (East)	NIT Third Place
2002–03	Temple	18–16	10–6	T–2nd (East)	NIT Quarterfinal
2003–04	Temple	15–14	9–7	2nd (East)	NIT First Round
2004–05	Temple	16–14	11–5	2nd (East)	NIT First Round
2005–06	Temple	17–16	8–8	T–7th	NIT Opening Round
Temple:		516–253 (.671)	296–100 (.747)		
Total:		741–312 (.704)			
National champion Postseason invitational champion Conference regular season champion Conference regular season and conference tournament champion Division regular season champion Division regular season and conference tournament champion Conference tournament champion

== Coaching tree ==
Assistant coaches under Chaney who became NCAA or NBA head coaches

- Dan Leibovitz - Hartford (2006–2010)
- Mark Macon - Binghamton (2009–2012)

== See also ==
- List of college men's basketball coaches with 600 wins
