= Morrisville Middle/Senior High School =

Public school in Morrisville, Pennsylvania, United States

Location
- 550 West Palmer St. Morrisville, Pennsylvania; United States
- Coordinates: 40.2079°N 74.7888°W

Information
- Type: Public
- Principal: Heather Brahan
- Teaching staff: 34.60 (FTE)
- Grades: 6-12
- Gender: Coeducational
- Enrollment: 413 (2023–2024)
- Student to teacher ratio: 11.94
- Colors: Blue and gold
- Mascot: Bulldog
- Website: mv.org

Morrisville Middle/Senior High School is a middle school/high school located in Morrisville, Bucks County, Pennsylvania, United States. The school is part of the School District of the Borough of Morrisville. The district's area is approximately two square miles. Due to the district's small size, there is no busing; all students walk to school.

== Academics ==
The three grades that make up the middle school (6th-8th) are taught by grade level teams consisting of a science, math, English, social studies, and special education teacher. The students also receive instruction in special subjects such as business, art, music, world language, and physical education.

=== High school departments ===
- Math
- English
- Social studies
- Science
- Art
- Music
- Technology education
- Business
- Wellness
- Foreign Languages

== Athletics ==
Morrisville High School is governed by the Pennsylvania Interscholastic Athletic Association (PIAA) in District 1, and is a member of the Bicentennial Athletic League. The girls' softball team has won the BAL title two consecutive seasons (2007 and 2009). The boys' baseball team also won the BAL title two consecutive seasons (2008 and 2009). The football team won both the BAL and IFL titles in 2012.

== Notable alumni ==
- Willard Curtin, politician
- Dick Hart, former professional football player
- Danny Napoleon, former professional baseball player
- Mike Vreeswyk, former Temple Owls and professional basketball player
