= Mike Vreeswyk =

American basketball player

Personal information
- Born: March 1, 1967 (age 59) Minneapolis, Minnesota, U.S.
- Listed height: 6 ft 7 in (2.01 m)
- Listed weight: 220 lb (100 kg)

Career information
- High school: Morrisville (Morrisville, Pennsylvania)
- College: Temple (1985–1989)
- NBA draft: 1989: undrafted
- Playing career: 1989–1998
- Position: Small forward
- Number: 32

Career history
- 1990: Zepter Vienna
- 1991: Kortrijk (Belgium)
- 1991–1992: Apollon Limassol
- 1992–1993: JSA Bordeaux
- 1992–1993: Yakima Sun Kings
- 1993–1994: Canoe Jeans Den Bosch
- 1994–1995: Hitashi Honso Rising Sun
- 1995: Ovar
- 1996–1997: Libertel Den Bosch
- 1997–1998: RZG Donar

Career highlights
- 2× Dutch League All-Star (1994, 1997); Dutch All-Star 3-Point shooting contest champion (1997); Cyprus League All-Star (1991); Cyprus All-Star 3-Point shooting contest champion (1991); Belgium League All-Star (1990); 2× Second-team All-Atlantic 10 (1988, 1989)

Mike Vreeswyk (born March 1, 1967) is an American former professional basketball player. He played college basketball for the Temple Owls where he was a three year starter for Naismith Memorial Basketball Hall of Fame coach John Chaney. On February 8, 2021, Vreeswyk eulogized the legendary coach in an emotional 10-minute speech at the Liacouras Center on Temple's campus (video). Vreeswyk has been involved with coaching youth basketball since 2010, and is currently an assistant coach at George School in Newtown PA.

== Career ==
=== High school career ===
Vreeswyk attended Morrisville High School in Pennsylvania from 1981 to 1985 and finished his career as the school's all-time leading scorer with 2,019 points (without the 3-point line). As a junior he averaged 23 points per game and was named Third Team All-State. As a senior he led the state of Pennsylvania in scoring with an average of 33.5 points per game and was named First Team All-State. For college, Vreeswyk selected nearby Temple University to play for future Hall of Fame coach John Chaney. He chose the Owls over Seton Hall, Boston College, UMass and West Virginia. In 1991 Morrisville High School retired Vreeswyk's #32 jersey, where it hangs proudly on the gymnasium wall. Vreeswyk attended the very first prestigious Nike ABCD (ABCD Camp) held at Princeton University in 1984.

=== College career ===
Vreeswyk attended Temple from 1985 to 1989. He was a three-year starter and finished his Temple career as the fifth leading scorer of all time with 1650 points. He is currently tied for 12th all time with Aaron McKie. He also left school as the holder of every 3-point record, including all-time 3-pointers made with 271, until surpassed by Lynn Greer in 2003. He is currently 3rd all time in 3-pointers made. He also set a record with 8 made 3-pointers in a game which stood as the record until Rick Brunson and Johnny Miller surpassed that total with 9. Vreeswyk is currently 5th all-time in 3-point FG percentage at .392. Vreeswyk is also currently 7th all-time in free throw percentage at .815. Vreeswyk is still tied for 1st all-time in NCAA Tournament free throw percentage at 100% (18–18 in the 1987–1988 NCAA Tournament). He was a member and second leading scorer on the 1987–88 team that was ranked #1 in the country for 9 weeks. The Owls entered the NCAA tournament as the #1 overall seed before losing to #2 Duke in the East Regional Finals.

=== Professional career ===
After college Vreeswyk had tryouts with the Seattle SuperSonics, Washington Bullets and Philadelphia 76ers before embarking on a 9-year professional career overseas. He played in Austria, Belgium, Cyprus, France, the Netherlands, Portugal and Japan. For two summers he played in the professional league in Venezuela. He also played in the Continental Basketball Association for the Yakima Sun Kings.

=== Honors ===
Morrisville High School #32 retired in 1991. Vreeswyk was inducted into the Philadelphia Big 5 College Basketball Hall of Fame in 1995, the Temple University Sports Hall of Fame in 2001, the Pennsylvania Sports Hall of Fame Bucks County Chapter in 2010 and enshrined in Temple Basketball's Ring of Honor in 2020.
