= Louisville Cardinals men's basketball statistical leaders =

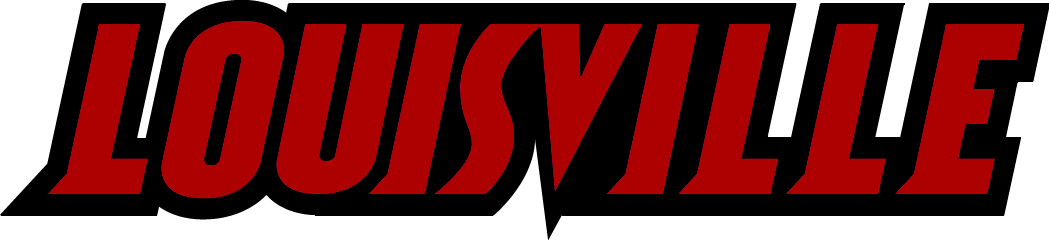

The Louisville Cardinals basketball statistical leaders are individual statistical leaders of the Louisville Cardinals men's basketball program in various categories, including points, rebounds, assists, steals, and blocks. Within those areas, the lists identify single-game, single-season, and career leaders. The Cardinals represent the University of Louisville in the NCAA's Atlantic Coast Conference.

Louisville began competing in intercollegiate basketball in 1911. However, the school's record book does not generally list records from before the 1950s, as records from before this period are often incomplete and inconsistent. Since scoring was much lower in this era, and teams played much fewer games during a typical season, it is likely that few or no players from this era would appear on these lists anyway.

The NCAA did not officially record assists as a stat until the 1983–84 season, and blocks and steals until the 1985–86 season, but Louisville's record books includes players in these stats before these seasons. These lists are updated through 9 February 2026.

== Scoring ==
Career
Rk	Player	Points	Seasons
1	Darrell Griffith	2333	1976–77 1977–78 1978–79 1979–80
2	DeJuan Wheat	2183	1993–94 1994–95 1995–96 1996–97
3	Pervis Ellison	2143	1985–86 1986–87 1987–88 1988–89
4	Reece Gaines	1945	1999–00 2000–01 2001–02 2002–03
5	Russ Smith	1908	2010–11 2011–12 2012–13 2013–14
6	Milt Wagner	1836	1981–82 1982–83 1983–84 1984–85 1985–86
7	Derek Smith	1826	1978–79 1979–80 1980–81 1981–82
8	LaBradford Smith	1806	1987–88 1988–89 1989–90 1990–91
9	Charlie Tyra	1728	1953–54 1954–55 1955–56 1956–57
10	Herbert Crook	1723	1984–85 1985–86 1986–87 1987–88

Season
Rk	Player	Points	Season
1	Darrell Griffith	825	1979–80
2	Russ Smith	748	2012–13
3	Charlie Tyra	690	1955–56
4	Russ Smith	673	2013–14
	Reece Gaines	673	2001–02
6	John Turner	669	1960–61
7	Jim Price	652	1971–72
8	Wes Unseld	645	1967–68
9	Ryan Conwell	638	2025–26
10	Pervis Ellison	617	1987–88

Single game
Rk	Player	Points	Season	Opponent
1	Wes Unseld	45	1967–68	Georgetown
	Mikel Brown	45	2025–26	NC State
3	Bud Olsen	44	1961–62	Kentucky Wesleyan
4	Russ Smith	42	2013–14	Rutgers
5	Butch Beard	41	1966–67	Bradley
6	Charlie Tyra	40	1956–57	Notre Dame
7	Charlie Tyra	38	1955–56	Morehead State
8	Reece Gaines	37	2001–02	Saint Louis
	Phil Rollins	37	1955–56	Eastern Kentucky
	Jordan Nwora	37	2019–20	Boston College
	Chucky Hepburn	37	2024–25	Pittsburgh

== Rebounds ==
Career
Rk	Player	Rebounds	Seasons
1	Charlie Tyra	1617	1953–54 1954–55 1955–56 1956–57
2	Wes Unseld	1551	1965–66 1966–67 1967–68
3	Pervis Ellison	1149	1985–86 1986–87 1987–88 1988–89
4	Fred Sawyer	1040	1958–59 1959–60 1960–61
5	Rodney McCray	1029	1979–80 1980–81 1981–82 1982–83
6	Ellis Myles	998	2000–01 2001–02 2002–03 2004–05
7	Terrence Williams	970	2005–06 2006–07 2007–08 2008–09
8	Billy Thompson	928	1982–83 1983–84 1984–85 1985–86
9	John Turner	919	1958–59 1959–60 1960–61
10	Derek Smith	884	1978–79 1979–80 1980–81 1981–82

Season
Rk	Player	Rebounds	Season
1	Charlie Tyra	645	1955–56
2	Wes Unseld	533	1966–67
3	Charlie Tyra	520	1956–57
4	Wes Unseld	513	1967–68
5	Wes Unseld	505	1965–66
6	Mike Grosso	432	1968–69
7	Ron Thomas	420	1971–72
8	Jerry DuPont	401	1957–58
9	Clifford Rozier	377	1993–94
10	Mike Grosso	376	1969–70

Single game
Rk	Player	Rebounds	Season	Opponent
1	Charlie Tyra	38	1955–56	Canisius
2	Wes Unseld	30	1966–67	Bellarmine
	Wes Unseld	30	1965–66	Wichita
4	Wes Unseld	29	1967–68	Georgetown College
5	Wes Unseld	28	1966–67	Southern Illinois
6	Wes Unseld	26	1966–67	Niagara
	Mike Grosso	26	1968–69	St. Louis
8	Wes Unseld	25	1966–67	LaSalle
	Wes Unseld	25	1967–68	Cincinnati
	Wes Unseld	25	1968–69	Kansas
	Mike Grosso	25	1968–69	Southern Mississippi

== Assists ==
Career
Rk	Player	Assists	Seasons
1	LaBradford Smith	713	1987–88 1988–89 1989–90 1990–91
2	Peyton Siva	677	2009–10 2010–11 2011–12 2012–13
3	Terrence Williams	545	2005–06 2006–07 2007–08 2008–09
4	Phil Bond	528	1972–73 1974–75 1975–76 1976–77
5	DeJuan Wheat	498	1993–94 1994–95 1995–96 1996–97
6	Keith Williams	482	1986–87 1987–88 1988–89 1989–90
7	Reece Gaines	475	1999–00 2000–01 2001–02 2002–03
8	Billy Thompson	459	1982–83 1983–84 1984–85 1985–86
9	Milt Wagner	432	1981–82 1982–83 1983–84 1984–85 1985–86
10	Rick Wilson	419	1974–75 1975–76 1976–77 1977–78

Season
Rk	Player	Assists	Season
1	Peyton Siva	228	2012–13
2	LaBradford Smith	226	1989–90
3	Peyton Siva	211	2011–12
4	Chucky Hepburn	198	2024–25
5	Terrence Williams	185	2008–09
6	LaBradford Smith	184	1988–89
7	Peyton Siva	182	2010–11
8	Russ Smith	172	2013–14
9	Milt Wagner	165	1985–86
10	Keith Williams	162	1989–90

Single game
Rk	Player	Assists	Season	Opponent
1	Chucky Hepburn	16	2024–25	SMU
2	Francisco Garcia	15	2003–04	Murray State
3	Phil Bond	14	1976–77	UCLA
4	Russ Smith	13	2013–14	Connecticut
	Peyton Siva	13	2012–13	Villanova
	Terrence Williams	13	2008–09	Hartford
	Cameron Murray	13	1997–98	Saint Louis
8	Darius Perry	12	2019–20	Youngstown State
	Christen Cunningham	12	2018–19	Duke
	Peyton Siva	12	2012–13	FIU
	LaBradford Smith	12	1990–91	South Carolina
	LaBradford Smith	12	1989–90	UCLA
	LaBradford Smith	12	1989–90	Cleveland State
	Keith Williams	12	1987–88	Brigham Young
	Henry Bacon	12	1971–72	Southwest Louisiana

== Steals ==
Career
Rk	Player	Steals	Seasons
1	Russ Smith	257	2010–11 2011–12 2012–13 2013–14
2	Peyton Siva	254	2009–10 2010–11 2011–12 2012–13
3	Darrell Griffith	230	1976–77 1977–78 1978–79 1979–80
4	LaBradford Smith	227	1987–88 1988–89 1989–90 1990–91
5	Tick Rogers	220	1992–93 1993–94 1994–95 1995–96
6	Alvin Sims	217	1993–94 1994–95 1995–96 1996–97
7	Terrence Williams	210	2005–06 2006–07 2007–08 2008–09
8	DeJuan Wheat	204	1993–94 1994–95 1995–96 1996–97
9	Lancaster Gordon	192	1980–81 1981–82 1982–83 1983–84
10	Reece Gaines	191	1999–00 2000–01 2001–02 2002–03

Season
Rk	Player	Steals	Season
1	Peyton Siva	90	2012–13
2	Russ Smith	87	2011–12
3	Darrell Griffith	86	1979–80
	Tick Rogers	86	1994–95
	Terrence Williams	86	2008–09
6	Alvin Sims	85	1996–97
7	Alvin Sims	84	1995–96
8	Russ Smith	83	2012–13
9	Chucky Hepburn	82	2024–25
10	LaBradford Smith	74	1989–90
	Russ Smith	74	2013–14

Single game
Rk	Player	Steals	Season	Opponent
1	Tick Rogers	10	1994–95	Western Carolina
2	Alvin Sims	9	1995–96	Virginia Commonwealth
3	Russ Smith	8	2012–13	NC A&T
4	Lancaster Gordon	7	1980–81	Tulane
	LaBradford Smith	7	1987–88	Houston
	Jason Osborne	7	1994–95	Tulane
	Alvin Sims	7	1995–96	Michigan State
	Edgar Sosa	7	2006–07	Sacramento State
	Terrence Williams	7	2008–09	Syracuse
	Peyton Siva	7	2010–11	St. John's
	Russ Smith	7	2011–12	Memphis
	Peyton Siva	7	2012–13	Notre Dame
	Donovan Mitchell	7	2016–17	Old Dominion
	Chucky Hepburn	7	2024–25	Indiana

== Blocks ==
Career
Rk	Player	Blocks	Seasons
1	Pervis Ellison	374	1985–86 1986–87 1987–88 1988–89
2	Gorgui Dieng	267	2010–11 2011–12 2012–13
3	Anas Mahmoud	218	2014–15 2015–16 2016–17 2017–18
4	Charles Jones	208	1980–81 1981–82 1982–83 1983–84
5	Billy Thompson	185	1982–83 1983–84 1984–85 1985–86
6	Rodney McCray	178	1979–80 1980–81 1981–82 1982–83
7	Scooter McCray	173	1978–79 1979–80 1980–81 1981–82 1982–83
	Cornelius Holden	173	1988–89 1989–90 1990–91 1991–92
9	Ricky Gallon	171	1974–75 1975–76 1976–77 1977–78
10	Terrence Jennings	158	2008–09 2009–10 2010–11

Season
Rk	Player	Blocks	Season
1	Gorgui Dieng	128	2011–12
2	Anas Mahmoud	104	2017–18
3	Pervis Ellison	102	1987–88
4	Pervis Ellison	98	1988–89
5	Pervis Ellison	92	1985–86
6	Gorgui Dieng	83	2012–13
7	Pervis Ellison	82	1986–87
	Charles Jones	82	1982–83
9	Samaki Walker	78	1994–95
10	Clifford Rozier	76	1993–94

Single game
Rk	Player	Blocks	Season	Opponent
1	Samaki Walker	11	1994–95	Kentucky
2	Charles Jones	10	1982–83	Wright State
3	Pervis Ellison	9	1986–87	UCLA
	Kendall Dartez	9	2003–04	Holy Cross
5	Billy Thompson	8	1985–86	Virginia Tech
	Pervis Ellison	8	1988–89	Western Kentucky
