= Metro Conference (1975–1995) men's basketball tournament =

Metro Conference (1975-1995) men's basketball tournament (defunct)
- Conference basketball championship
- Sport: College basketball
- Conference: Metro Conference
- Format: Single-elimination tournament
- Played: 1976–1995
- Current champion: Louisville
- Most championships: Louisville (11)

Host stadiums
- Freedom Hall (1976, 1980–81, 1985–87, 1992–93, 1995); Mid-South Coliseum (1977, 1979, 1982, 1984, 1988); Riverfront Coliseum (1978, 1983); Carolina Coliseum (1989); Mississippi Coast Coliseum (1990, 1994); Roanoke Civic Center (1991)

Host locations
- Louisville, KY (1976, 1980–81, 1985–87, 1992–93, 1995); Memphis, TN (1977, 1979, 1982, 1984, 1988); Cincinnati, OH (1978, 1983); Columbia, SC (1989); Biloxi, MS (1990, 1994); Roanoke, VA (1991)

The Metro Conference (1975-1995) men's basketball tournament was the conference championship tournament in men's basketball for the Metro Conference. The tournament was held annually between 1976 and 1996, when the Metro Conference was absorbed into Conference USA in 1996.

The winner of the tournament was guaranteed a spot in the NCAA basketball tournament each year.

== Tournament champions by year ==
Year	Metro Champion	Score	Runner-up	Most Outstanding Player	Venue (and city)
1976	Cincinnati	103–95	Memphis State	Dexter Reed, Memphis State	Freedom Hall (Louisville, Kentucky)
1977	Cincinnati	74–61	Georgia Tech	Gary Yoder, Cincinnati	Mid-South Coliseum (Memphis, Tennessee)
1978	Louisville	94–93	Florida State	Rick Wilson, Louisville	Riverfront Coliseum (Cincinnati, Ohio)
1979	Virginia Tech	68–60	Florida State	Dale Solomon, Virginia Tech	Mid-South Coliseum (Memphis, Tennessee)
1980	Louisville	81–72	Florida State	Darrell Griffith, Louisville	Freedom Hall (Louisville, Kentucky)
1981	Louisville	42–31	Cincinnati	Rodney McCray, Louisville	Freedom Hall (Louisville, Kentucky)
1982	Memphis State	73–62	Louisville	Keith Lee, Memphis State	Mid-South Coliseum (Memphis, Tennessee)
1983	Louisville	66–51	Tulane	Rodney McCray, Louisville	Riverfront Coliseum (Cincinnati, Ohio)
1984	Memphis State	78–65	Virginia Tech	Keith Lee, Memphis State	Mid-South Coliseum (Memphis, Tennessee)
1985	Memphis State	90–86 (OT)	Florida State	Dean Shaffer, Florida State	Freedom Hall (Louisville, Kentucky)
1986	Louisville	88–79	Memphis State	Pervis Ellison, Louisville	Freedom Hall (Louisville, Kentucky)
1987	Memphis State	75–52	Louisville	Marvin Alexander, Memphis State	Freedom Hall (Louisville, Kentucky)
1988	Louisville	81–73	Memphis State	Herbert Crook, Louisville	Mid-South Coliseum (Memphis, Tennessee)
1989	Louisville	87–80	Florida State	Pervis Ellison, Louisville	Carolina Coliseum (Columbia, South Carolina)
1990	Louisville	83–80	Southern Miss	LaBradford Smith, Louisville	Mississippi Coast Coliseum (Biloxi, Mississippi)
1991	Florida State	76–69	Louisville	LaBradford Smith, Louisville	Roanoke Civic Center (Roanoke, Virginia)
1992	UNC Charlotte	64–63	Tulane	Henry Williams, UNC Charlotte	Freedom Hall (Louisville, Kentucky)
1993	Louisville	90–78	Virginia Commonwealth	Dwayne Morton, Louisville	Freedom Hall (Louisville, Kentucky)
1994	Louisville	69–61	Southern Miss	Clifford Rozier, Louisville	Mississippi Coast Coliseum (Biloxi, Mississippi)
1995	Louisville	78–64	Southern Miss	DeJuan Wheat, Louisville	Freedom Hall (Louisville, Kentucky)

== Championships by school ==
Titles	School
11	Louisville
4	Memphis
2	Cincinnati
1	UNC Charlotte, Florida State, Virginia Tech

== Television coverage ==
Year	Network	Play-by-play	Analyst
1994	Raycom	Fred White	Terry Gannon
1993	Raycom	Fred White	Terry Gannon
1990	CBS	Greg Gumbel	Quinn Buckner
1989	Raycom Sports; ESPN	Fred White; Roger Twibell	Jack Givens; Larry Conley
1988	ESPN	Tim Brando	Bill Raftery
1987	Raycom	Fred White	Larry Conley
1986	Raycom	Fred White	Jack Givens and Steve Grote
1985	CBS	Brent Musburger	Billy Packer
1984	CBS	Gary Bender	Billy Packer
1983	CBS	Frank Glieber	Steve Grote
1982	CBS	Frank Glieber	Steve Grote
1980	Tanner Sports Network	Ron Jacober	Oscar Robertson

== See also ==
- Metro Conference Men's Basketball Player of the Year
