= Louisville Cardinals men's basketball =

NCAA Division I basketball program

2026–27 Louisville Cardinals men's basketball team
- University: University of Louisville
- First season: 1911–12; 115 years ago
- Athletic director: Josh Heird
- Head coach: Pat Kelsey; 3rd season, 51–18 (.739)
- Location: Louisville, Kentucky
- Arena: KFC Yum! Center (capacity: 22,090)
- NCAA division: Division I
- Conference: ACC
- Nickname: Cardinals
- Colors: Red and black
- Student section: "The Ville'ns"
- All-time record: 1,958–1,032 (.655)
- NCAA tournament record: 77–46 (.626)

NCAA Division I tournament champions
- 1980, 1986, 2013*
Other NCAA Division I tournament results
Final Four	1959, 1972, 1975, 1980, 1982, 1983, 1986, 2005, 2012*, 2013*
Elite Eight	1959, 1972, 1975, 1980, 1982, 1983, 1986, 1997, 2005, 2008, 2009, 2012*, 2013*, 2015*
Sweet Sixteen	1951, 1959, 1961, 1967, 1968, 1972, 1974, 1975, 1978, 1979, 1980, 1982, 1983, 1984, 1986, 1988, 1989, 1993, 1994, 1996, 1997, 2005, 2008, 2009, 2012*, 2013*, 2014*, 2015*
Appearances	1951, 1959, 1961, 1964, 1967, 1968, 1972, 1974, 1975, 1977, 1978, 1979, 1980, 1981, 1982, 1983, 1984, 1986, 1988, 1989, 1990, 1992, 1993, 1994, 1995, 1996, 1997, 1999, 2000, 2003, 2004, 2005, 2007, 2008, 2009, 2010, 2011, 2012*, 2013*, 2014*, 2015*, 2017, 2019, 2025, 2026

NIT champions
- 1956

NAIA tournament champions
- 1948

Conference tournament champions
- KIAC: 1928, 1929 Metro: 1978, 1980, 1981, 1983, 1986, 1988, 1989, 1990, 1993, 1994, 1995 C-USA: 2003, 2005 Big East: 2009, 2012*, 2013* AAC: 2014*

Conference regular-season champions
- MVC: 1967, 1968, 1969, 1971, 1972, 1974, 1975 Metro: 1977, 1979, 1980, 1981, 1983, 1984, 1986, 1987, 1988, 1990, 1993, 1994 C-USA: 2005 Big East: 2009, 2013* AAC: 2014*

Uniforms
Home	Away	Alternate
- * vacated by NCAA

The Louisville Cardinals men's basketball team is the men's college basketball program representing the University of Louisville (U of L) in the Atlantic Coast Conference (ACC) of NCAA Division I. The Cardinals have officially won two NCAA championships in 1980 and 1986 (with the 2013 title being vacated); and have officially been to eight Final Fours (with the 2012 and 2013 appearances being vacated) in 41 official NCAA tournament appearances while compiling 62 tournament wins.

== History ==
=== "Peck" Hickman era (1944–1967) ===
Bernard "Peck" Hickman's 1944 team finished with a 16–3 record and started a string of 46 consecutive winning seasons, which was an NCAA record.

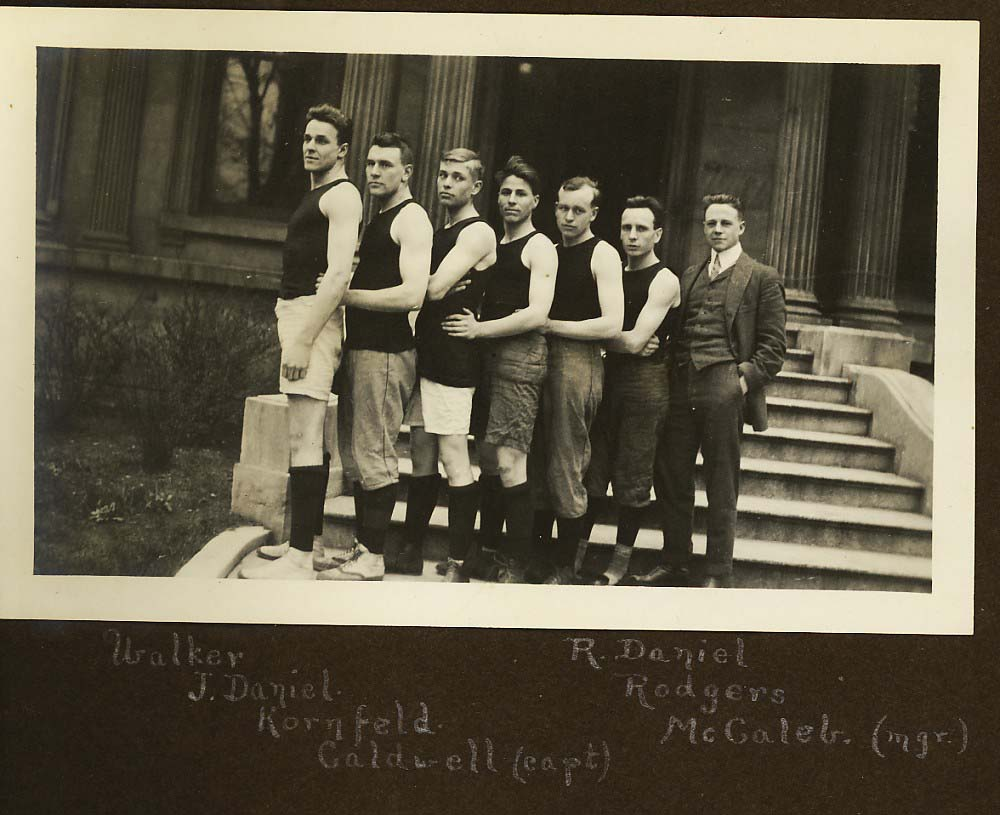
Men's basketball team, 1914, CN Caldwell, captain

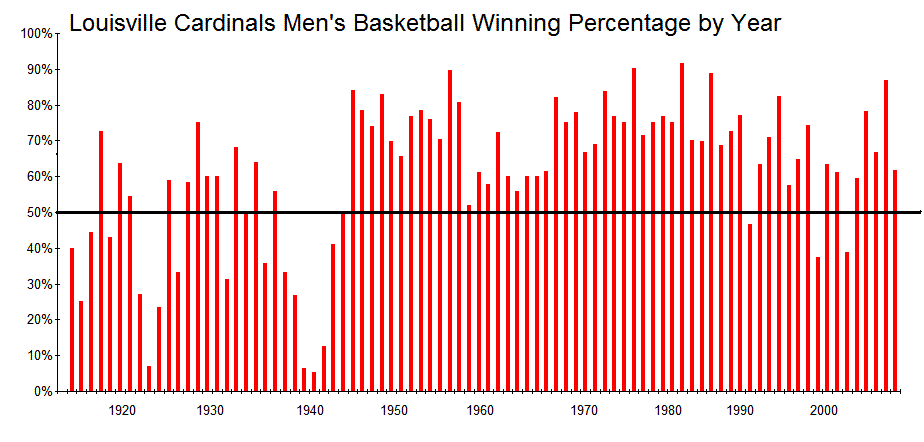
U of L winning percentage by year

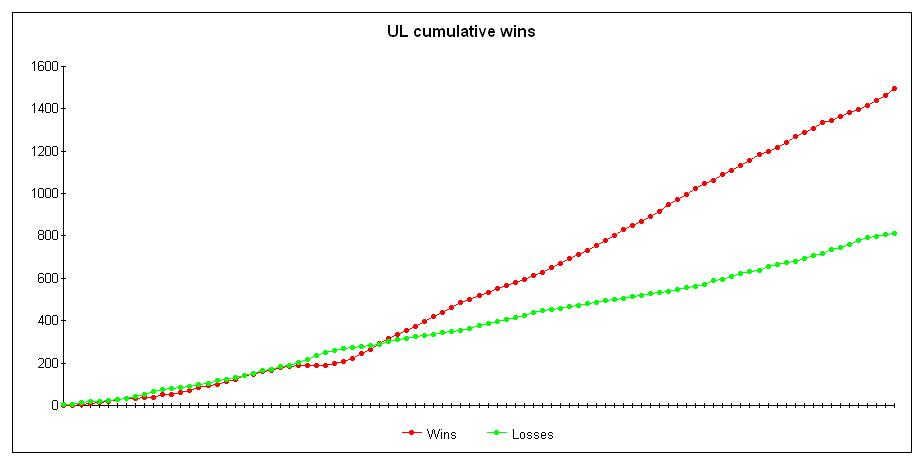
U of L all-time wins/losses graph

Hickman led Louisville to its first championship on a national level by winning the NAIB tournament in 1948. In 1956, led by All-American Charlie Tyra, the Cardinals won the NIT Championship. In 1956 his team was placed on two years probation, to include bans on postseason play, by the NCAA due to recruiting violations. In 1959, Louisville made its first NCAA Final Four appearance behind the play of All-American Don Goldstein.

The Cardinals never had a losing season in Hickman's 23 seasons as head coach. He coached 11 20-win teams, appeared in five NCAA tournaments, coached six NIT appearances and finished with a 443–183 overall record, a .708 winning percentage that ranks him in the top 45 all time.

=== John Dromo era (1967–1971) ===
John Dromo was Hickman's assistant for 17 years and succeeded him at head coach in 1967. In four seasons as head coach, Dromo led the Cardinals to a 68–23 record (.747 winning percentage) and the 1967 Missouri Valley Conference title.

A heart attack during the 1970–71 season forced Dromo to retire. His assistant, Howard Stacey, was named interim head coach for the final 20 games of the season.

=== Denny Crum era (1971–2001) ===
Denny Crum was hired as head coach from his alma mater, UCLA, where he was the top assistant coach to John Wooden. It was under the guidance of Crum that Louisville became a college basketball power. In his first season, he guided the Cardinals to the NCAA Final Four, becoming the first coach ever to go to a Final Four in his first season as a head coach. Overall, Crum had six Final Fours with the Cardinals (1972, 1975, 1980, 1982, 1983, 1986). He is fifth all-time in Final Four appearances.

The Cardinals won the 1980 NCAA tournament championship by defeating UCLA 59–54. Six years later, Louisville would overcome Duke 72–69 for a second title. Crum is one of only 11 coaches to win two or more national championships. He was named National Coach of the Year in 1980, 1983 and 1986.

He took the Cardinals to 23 NCAA tournaments, where they had an overall record of 43–21. While in the Metro Conference, the Cardinals won 12 regular season titles and 11 tournament championships. In its 19 years of naming a champion, the Metro had Louisville as first or second place 17 times. In 1993, Crum became the second fastest coach to reach 500 wins.

Crum was inducted into the Naismith Hall of Fame in 1994. He retired in 2001 with a career record of 675–295 (.696 winning percentage) over 30 seasons. He was a member of the College Basketball Hall of Fame's inaugural class in 2006.

=== Rick Pitino era (2001–2017) ===
Rick Pitino was hired in 2001 after four years as head coach of the Boston Celtics, and previously as head coach of Louisville's in-state rival, Kentucky.

Pitino guided the Cardinals to the NCAA Tournament in 12 of 15 seasons, reaching the Elite Eight six times and the Final Four three times (2005, 2012, and 2013). His teams won six conference tournament championships and four regular season titles. The Cardinals won at least 20 games every season since Pitino's first season at Louisville. Through the 2015–16 season, Pitino amassed a record of 391–134 (.745) during his time at Louisville.

Pitino was selected to the Naismith Memorial Basketball Hall of Fame in 2013, and was under contract through the 2025–26 season.

The University of Louisville self-imposed a postseason ban for the 2015–16 season amid an ongoing NCAA investigation over an escort sex scandal involving recruits between 2010 and 2014. The ban included both the ACC tournament and the NCAA tournament.

On June 15, 2017, the NCAA charged Rick Pitino for failure to monitor his basketball program which was involved in a sex-for-pay scandal. He was suspended for the first five games of the ACC season in 2017–18.

On September 26, 2017, federal prosecutors in New York announced that the school was under investigation for an alleged "pay for play" scheme involving recruits at Louisville. The allegations state that an Adidas executive conspired to pay $100,000 to the family of a top-ranked national recruit to play at Louisville and to represent Adidas when he turned pro. The criminal complaint did not name Louisville specifically but appeared to involve the recruitment of Brian Bowen, a late, surprise commit to the school. On September 27, 2017, Pitino and athletic director Tom Jurich were placed on administrative leave.

On October 26, 2017, Rick Pitino was fired as the head coach of Louisville Men's Basketball.

On February 20, 2018, the NCAA ruled that Louisville must vacate its records from 2011 to 2015. This included 123 wins, the 2013 NCAA title, and a 2012 Final Four appearance.

=== Chris Mack era (2018–2022) ===
On March 27, 2018, Xavier head coach Chris Mack agreed to terms on a seven-year contract worth about $4 million annually to become the next head coach at Louisville. Louisville was the first ever school to hire away a head coach whose previous team was a 1 seed in the NCAA tournament. Mack had a notable start to his Louisville tenure, recruiting a top-5 2019 class that included a 5-star player, four 4-star players, and a three-star player. Picked to finish 11th in the 2018 preseason ACC poll, Mack led the Cardinals to a 20–14 season peaking at #15 in the AP polls and finishing in seventh place in the ACC standings with signature wins over #9 Michigan State, #12 North Carolina, and #11 Virginia Tech and tough losses to #5 Tennessee, Marquette, #22 Florida State, and #2 Duke. Under Mack, Louisville made only one NCAA tournament appearance.

On January 26, 2022, Louisville and Chris Mack mutually agreed to part ways.

=== Kenny Payne era (2022–2024) ===
On March 18, 2022, it was announced that the University of Louisville signed Kenny Payne to a six-year contract as head coach.

Kenny Payne ended his first season with the worst record in modern times for any Louisville team, finishing the season 4–28.

On March 13, 2024, Louisville fired Payne after a two-year record of 12–52.

=== Pat Kelsey era (2024–present) ===
On March 28, 2024, Pat Kelsey was introduced as the 23rd head coach for the Louisville Cardinals men's basketball team, signing a 5-year contract.

In year one, Kelsey took over a program that won just 12 games in the previous two seasons and hadn't made the NCAA Tournament since 2018. Despite this, Kelsey led the "reviville", leading the Cards to a 27–8 record and an 18–2 record in ACC Play. The Cardinals secured the two-seed in the ACC Tournament where they defeated seventh seed Stanford and third-seed Clemson, securing the programs first trip to the ACC Championship where they lost to first seed and top ranked Duke 73–62. Louisville received an at-large bid to the NCAA tournament as a No. 8 seed, where they lost in the first round to Creighton. Due to the success and quick program turn around in year one, Pat Kelsey won ACC Coach of the Year.

== Notable achievements ==
As of the end of the 2015–16 season, Louisville had an all-time 1778–892 record in 102 seasons of intercollegiate basketball ranking 10th in all-time victories and seventh in all-time winning percentage among NCAA Division I schools. From 1944 to 1990, Louisville had an NCAA-record 46 straight winning seasons, winning 20 or more games on 31 occasions during that period.

Louisville has made 42 NCAA Tournament appearances (5th all-time) and 15 NIT appearances. The Cardinals have reached the NCAA Tournament 32 of the last 40 years (12 of the last 15, 14 of the last 18 years, 20 of last 25). Since the NCAA began keeping Sweet Sixteen appearance records in 1975, Louisville's 21 Sweet Sixteens are 5th all-time behind North Carolina (26), Kentucky (25), Duke (24), and Kansas (22). The Cardinals have reached the Elite Eight on 14 occasions, including five of the past nine seasons. Louisville is sixth in tournament victories (75) with a 75–41 overall NCAA Tournament record, reaching the Final Four 10 times.

Louisville is the only school in the nation to have claimed the championship of three major national post-season tournaments including the 1948 NAIA championship, the 1956 NIT title, and the 1980, 1986 and 2013 NCAA championships. Simultaneously, Louisville is the only school in NCAA history to have a Men's Basketball National Championship vacated, along with 2 Final Four appearances.

=== By the numbers ===
Tradition	Number	National rank
All-time NCAA Tournament titles	2*	t-9th
All-time NCAA Tournaments	41*	8th
All-time NCAA Tournament Wins	62*	6th
All-time NCAA Final Fours	8*	8th
All-time victories	1811*	31st
All-time winning percentage	.640*	15th

* NCAA vacated all wins from 2011 to 2015

== Post-season results ==
=== National championships ===
==== 1948 NAIA Tournament Championship ====
1948 NAIA Tournament Results
Round	Opponent	Score
First Round	South Dakota State	63–60
Sweet Sixteen	Emporia State	82–66
Elite Eight	Beloit	85–76
Final Four	Xavier	56–49
Championship	Indiana State	82–70

==== 1956 NIT Championship ====
1956 NIT Tournament Results
Round	Opponent	Score
First Round	Bye	
Elite Eight	Duquesne	84–72
Final Four	Saint Joseph's	89–79
Championship	Dayton	93–80

==== 1980 NCAA Tournament Championship ====
1980 NCAA Tournament Results
Round	Opponent	Score
First Round	Bye	–
Second Round	Kansas State	71–69 OT
Sweet Sixteen	Texas A&M	66–55 OT
Elite Eight	LSU	86–66
Final Four	Iowa	80–72
Championship	UCLA	59–54

==== 1986 NCAA Tournament Championship ====
1986 NCAA Tournament Results
Round	Opponent	Score
First Round	Drexel	93–73
Second Round	Bradley	82–56
Sweet Sixteen	North Carolina	94–79
Elite Eight	Auburn	84–76
Final Four	LSU	88–77
Championship	Duke	72–69

==== 2013 NCAA Tournament Championship (Vacated) ====
2013 NCAA Tournament Results
Round	Opponent	Score
First Round	North Carolina A&T	79–48
Second Round	Colorado State	82–56
Sweet Sixteen	Oregon	77–69
Elite Eight	Duke	85–63
Final Four	Wichita State	68–62
Championship	Michigan	82–76

=== NCAA Tournament Final Four history ===
- 1959– Fourth place
- 1972– Fourth place
- 1975– Third place
- 1980– Champion
- 1982– Semifinalist
- 1983– Semifinalist
- 1986– Champion
- 2005–Semifinalist
- 2012– Semifinalist – Vacated
- 2013– Champion – Vacated

=== NCAA Tournament Most Outstanding Player ===
- 1980 – Darrell Griffith
- 1986 – Pervis Ellison
- 2013 – Luke Hancock

=== NCAA tournament seeding history ===
The NCAA began seeding the tournament with the 1979 edition.

Years →	'79	'80	'81	'82	'83	'84	'86	'88	'89	'90	'92	'93	'94	'95	'96	'97	'99
Seeds→	3	2	4	3	1	5	2	5	4	4	8	4	3	11	6	6	7

Years →	'00	'03	'04	'05	'07	'08	'09	'10	'11	'12	'13	'14	'15	'17	'19	'25	'26
Seeds→	7	4	10	4	6	3	1*	9	4	4	1*	4	4	2	7	8	6

* – Overall number one seed. The committee began ranking 1 seeds in 2004.

=== Complete NCAA tournament results ===
The Cardinals have appeared in the NCAA tournament 41* (45) times. Their combined record is 62–46* (77–46).

* – NCAA vacated all wins from 2011 to 2015.

Year	Seed	Round	Opponent	Result
1951		Sweet Sixteen	Kentucky	L 68–79
1959		First Round; Sweet Sixteen; Elite Eight; Final Four; National 3rd Place Game	Eastern Kentucky; Kentucky; Michigan State; West Virginia; Cincinnati	W 77–63; W 76–61; W 88–81; L 79–94; L 85–98
1961		First Round; Sweet Sixteen; Regional 3rd Place Game	Ohio; Ohio State; Morehead State	W 76–70; L 55–56; W 83–61
1964		First Round	Ohio	L 69–71 OT
1967		Sweet Sixteen; Regional 3rd Place Game	SMU; Kansas	L 81–83; L 68–70
1968		Sweet Sixteen; Regional 3rd Place Game	Houston; Kansas State	L 75–91; W 93–63
1972		Sweet Sixteen; Elite Eight; Final Four; National 3rd Place Game	Southwest Louisiana; Kansas State; UCLA; North Carolina	W 88–84; W 72–65; L 77–96; L 91–105
1974		Sweet Sixteen; Regional 3rd Place Game	Oral Roberts; Creighton	L 93–96; L 71–80
1975		First Round; Sweet Sixteen; Elite Eight; Final Four; National 3rd Place Game	Rutgers; Cincinnati; Maryland; UCLA; Syracuse	W 91–78; W 78–63; W 96–82; L 74–75 OT; W 96–88 OT
1977		First Round	UCLA	L 79–87
1978		First Round; Sweet Sixteen	St. John's; DePaul	W 76–68; L 89–90 2OT
1979	#3	Second Round; Sweet Sixteen	6 South Alabama; 2 Arkansas	W 69–66; L 62–73
1980	#2	Second Round; Sweet Sixteen; Elite Eight; Final Four; National Championship	7 Kansas State; 6 Texas A&M; 1 LSU; 5 Iowa; 8 UCLA	W 71–69 OT; W 66–55 OT; W 86–66; W 80–72; W 59–54
1981	#4	Second Round	5 Arkansas	L 73–74
1982	#3	Second Round; Sweet Sixteen; Elite Eight; Final Four	11 Middle Tennessee; 2 Minnesota; 4 UAB; 1 Georgetown	W 81–56; W 67–61; W 75–68; L 46–50
1983	#1	Second Round; Sweet Sixteen; Elite Eight; Final Four	8 Tennessee; 4 Arkansas; 3 Kentucky; 1 Houston	W 70–57; W 65–63; W 80–68 OT; L 81–94
1984	#5	First Round; Second Round; Sweet Sixteen	12 Morehead State; 4 Tulsa; 1 Kentucky	W 72–59; W 69–67; L 67–72
1986	#2	First Round; Second Round; Sweet Sixteen; Elite Eight; Final Four; National Championship	15 Drexel; 7 Bradley; 3 North Carolina; 8 Auburn; 11 LSU; 1 Duke	W 93–73; W 82–68; W 94–79; W 84–76; W 88–77; W 72–69
1988	#5	First Round; Second Round; Sweet Sixteen	12 Oregon State; 4 BYU; 1 Oklahoma	W 70–61; W 97–76; L 98–108
1989	#4	First Round; Second Round; Sweet Sixteen	13 Arkansas–Little Rock; 5 Arkansas; 1 Illinois	W 76–71; W 93–84; L 69–83
1990	#4	First Round; Second Round	13 Idaho; 12 Ball State	W 78–59; L 60–62
1992	#8	First Round; Second Round	9 Wake Forest; 1 UCLA	W 81–58; L 69–85
1993	#4	First Round; Second Round; Sweet Sixteen	13 Delaware; 5 Oklahoma State; 1 Indiana	W 76–70; W 78–63; L 69–82
1994	#3	First Round; Second Round; Sweet Sixteen	14 Boise State; 6 Minnesota; 2 Arizona	W 67–58; W 60–55; L 70–82
1995	#11	First Round	6 Memphis	L 56–77
1996	#6	First Round; Second Round; Sweet Sixteen	11 Tulsa; 3 Villanova; 2 Wake Forest	W 82–80 OT; W 68–64; L 59–60
1997	#6	First Round; Second Round; Sweet Sixteen; Elite Eight	11 Massachusetts; 3 New Mexico; 10 Texas; 1 North Carolina	W 65–57; W 64–63; W 78–63; L 74–97
1999	#7	First Round	10 Creighton	L 58–62
2000	#7	First Round	10 Gonzaga	L 66–77
2003	#4	First Round; Second Round	13 Austin Peay; 12 Butler	W 86–64; L 79–71
2004	#10	First Round	7 Xavier	L 70–80
2005	#4	First Round; Second Round; Sweet Sixteen; Elite Eight; Final Four	13 Louisiana–Lafayette; 5 Georgia Tech; 1 Washington; 7 West Virginia; 1 Illinois	W 68–62; W 76–54; W 93–79; W 93–85 OT; L 57–72
2007	#6	First Round; Second Round	11 Stanford; 3 Texas A&M	W 78–58; L 69–72
2008	#3	First Round; Second Round; Sweet Sixteen; Elite Eight	14 Boise State; 6 Oklahoma; 2 Tennessee; 1 North Carolina	W 79–61; W 78–48; W 79–60; L 73–83
2009	#1	First Round; Second Round; Sweet Sixteen; Elite Eight	16 Morehead State; 9 Siena; 12 Arizona; 2 Michigan State	W 74–54; W 79–72; W 103–64; L 52–64
2010	#9	First Round	8 California	L 62–77
2011	#4	Second Round	13 Morehead State	L 61–62
2012*	#4	Second Round; Third Round; Sweet Sixteen; Elite Eight; Final Four	13 Davidson; 5 New Mexico; 1 Michigan State; 7 Florida; 1 Kentucky	W 69–62; W 59–56; W 57–44; W 72–68; L 61–69
2013*	#1	Second Round; Third Round; Sweet Sixteen; Elite Eight; Final Four; National Championship	16 North Carolina A&T; 8 Colorado State; 12 Oregon; 2 Duke; 9 Wichita State; 4 Michigan	W 79–48; W 82–56; W 77–69; W 85–63; W 72–68; W 82–76
2014*	#4	Second Round; Third Round; Sweet Sixteen	13 Manhattan; 5 Saint Louis; 8 Kentucky	W 71–64; W 66–51; L 69–74
2015*	#4	Second Round; Third Round; Sweet Sixteen; Elite Eight	13 UC Irvine; 5 Northern Iowa; 8 NC State; 7 Michigan State	W 57–55; W 66–53; W 75–65; L 70–76 OT
2017	#2	First Round; Second Round	15 Jacksonville State; 7 Michigan	W 78–63; L 69–73
2019	#7	First Round	10 Minnesota	L 76–86
2025	#8	First Round	9 Creighton	L 75–89
2026	#6	First Round; Second Round	11 South Florida; 3 Michigan State	W 83–79; L 69–77

=== Complete NIT results ===
The Cardinals have appeared in the National Invitation Tournament (NIT) 15 times. Their combined record is 16–15. They were the 1956 NIT Champions.

Year	Round	Opponent	Result
1952	First Round	WKU	L 59–62
1953	First Round; Quarterfinals	Georgetown; Manhattan	W 92–79; L 66–79
1954	First Round	St. Francis (NY)	L 55–60
1955	First Round; Quarterfinals	Manhattan; Duquesne	W 91–86; L 66–74
1956	Quarterfinals; Semifinals; Finals	Duquesne; Saint Joseph's; Dayton	W 84–72; W 89–79; W 93–80
1966	First Round	Boston College	L 90–96
1969	First Round; Quarterfinals	Fordham; Boston College	W 73–70; L 83–88
1970	First Round	Oklahoma	L 73–74
1971	First Round	Providence	L 58–64
1973	First Round; Quarterfinals	American; Notre Dame	W 97–84; L 71–79
1976	Quarterfinals	Providence	L 67–73
1985	First Round; Second Round; Quarterfinals; Semifinals; 3rd Place Game	Alcorn State; South Florida; Chattanooga; UCLA; Tennessee	W 77–75; W 68–61; W 71–66; L 66–75; L 84–100
2002	First Round; Second Round	Princeton; Temple	W 66–65; L 62–65
2006	First Round; Second Round; Quarterfinals; Semifinals	Delaware State; Clemson; Missouri State; South Carolina	W 71–54; W 74–68; W 74–56; L 63–78
2018	First Round; Second Round; Quarterfinals	Northern Kentucky; Middle Tennessee; Mississippi State	W 66–58; W 84–68; L 56–79

=== Regular season conference championships ===
The Cardinals have won 23 conference regular season championships.

Since the 2014–15 season they have played in the Atlantic Coast Conference. Before that, they belonged to the Kentucky Intercollegiate Athletic Conference from the 1925–26 to 1947–48 seasons, the Ohio Valley Conference for the 1948–49 season, the Missouri Valley Conference from 1964–65 to 1974–75, the Metro Conference from 1975–76 to 1994–95, Conference USA from 1995–96 to 2004–05, the Big East Conference from 2005–06 to 2012–13, and the American Athletic Conference in 2013–14.

They played as an independent school from 1911–12 to 1924–25 and from 1949–50 to 1963–64 (29 total seasons).

Missouri Valley Conference (7)

- 1967, 1968, 1969, 1971, 1972, 1974, 1975

Metro Conference (12)

- 1977, 1979, 1980, 1981, 1983, 1984, 1986, 1987, 1988, 1990, 1993, 1994

Conference USA (1)

- 2005

Big East Conference (2)

- 2009, 2013 (Vacated)

American Athletic Conference (1)

- 2014 (Vacated)

=== Conference tournament championships ===
The Cardinal have won 19 conference tournament championships.

Kentucky Intercollegiate Athletic Conference tournament (2)

- 1928, 1929

Metro Conference tournament (11)

- 1978, 1980, 1981, 1983, 1986, 1988, 1989, 1990, 1993, 1994, 1995

Conference USA tournament (2)

- 2003, 2005.

Big East Conference tournament (3)

- 2009, 2012 (Vacated), 2013 (Vacated)

American Athletic tournament (1)

- 2014 (Vacated)

== Rivalries ==
=== Kentucky Wildcats ===
The Kentucky–Louisville rivalry has been ranked the 2nd best rivalry in college basketball by Bleacher Report and 3rd best rivalry in all of college sports by Basketball Hall of Fame contributor Dick Vitale. Kentucky and Louisville first played against each other in 1913 but stopped playing each other in the 1920s, playing only twelve times between 1913 and 1983. The rivalry was generally dormant with only occasional matchups until the teams met in the 1983 NCAA tournament. Since then, the two teams have met each year in late December or early January.

Much like the Iron Bowl, the Kentucky–Louisville rivalry is all the more intense because the two schools have consistently been among the nation's elite men's basketball teams for most of the last 50 years. Both schools are also two of the most victorious programs in NCAA men's basketball history; Kentucky is #1 on the list of all-time winningest programs in Division I Men's Basketball and Louisville #26 (#10 including vacated victories). Kentucky has eight national championships while Louisville has two (officially; three including the vacated 2013 title) national championships.

=== Cincinnati Bearcats ===
While predominantly a football rivalry, the proximity and long-standing conference affiliation of Cincinnati and Louisville made this into a key rivalry, particularly in the days of the Metro and Big East conferences. This rivalry went on hiatus in 2014 when Louisville left the American Athletic Conference for the ACC.

== Notable Cardinals ==
=== Retired numbers ===
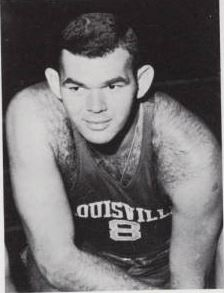
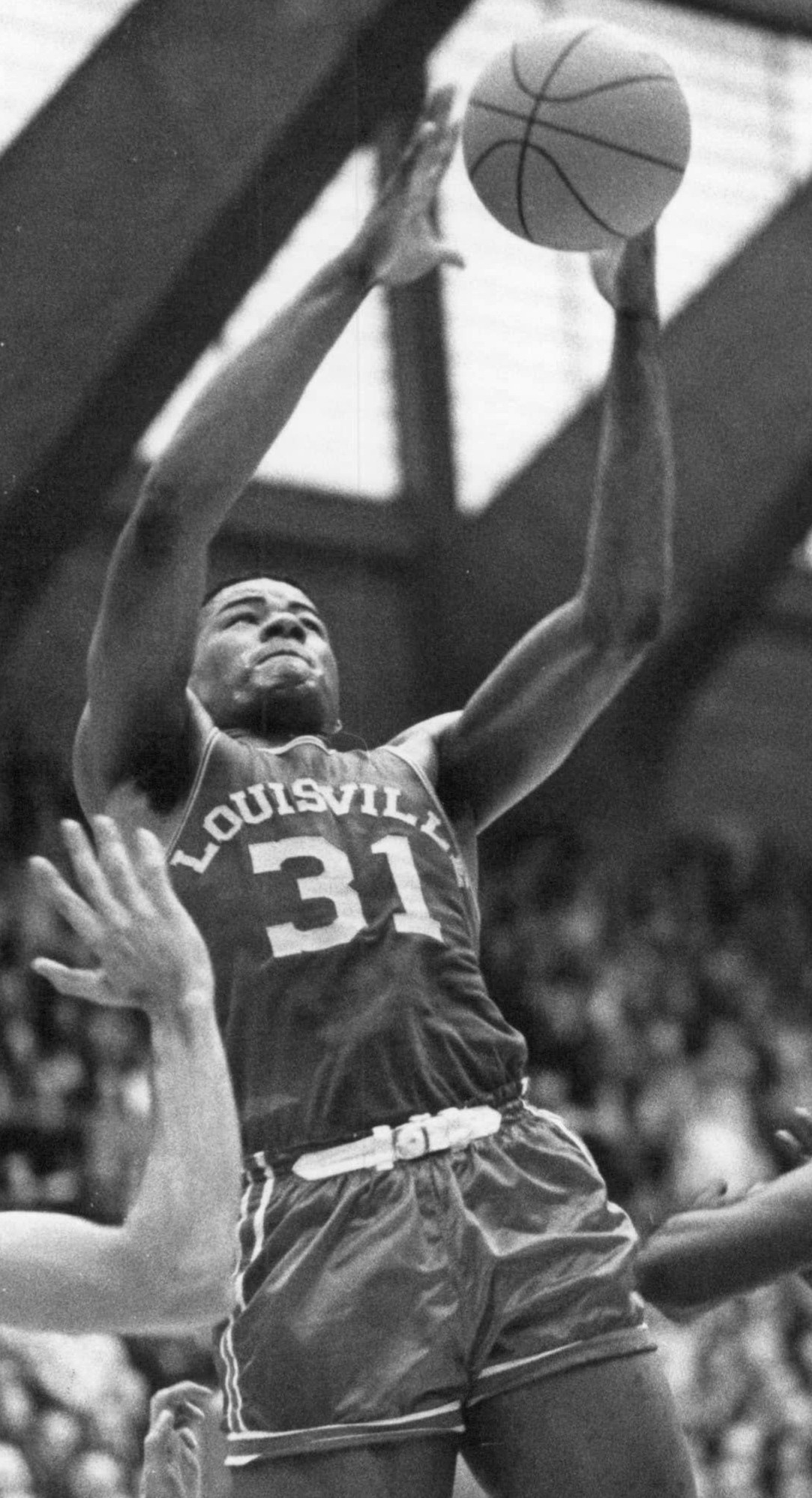
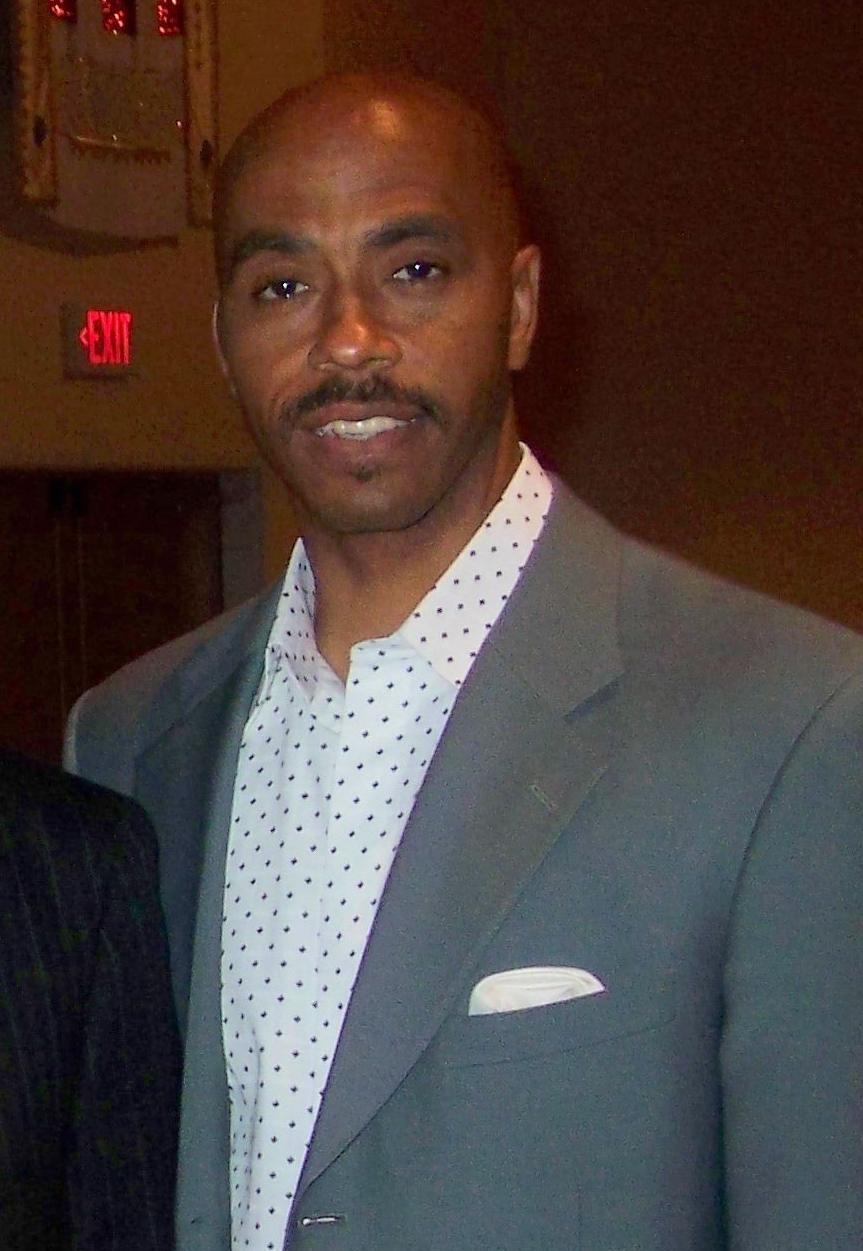
Charlie Tyra, Wes Unseld, and Darrell Griffith, whose numbers were retired by Louisville

Louisville Cardinals retired numbers
No.	Player	Pos.	Tenure	No. ret.	Ref.
2	Russ Smith	PG	2010–14	2022	
8	Charlie Tyra	PF	1954–57		
31	Wes Unseld	C	1966–68		
35	Darrell Griffith	SG	1977–80		
42	Pervis Ellison	C	1986–89		

Louisville basketball has honored five former players by retiring their numbers. Except as noted, these are the last players to wear these numbers for a Louisville men's squad:

- Charlie Tyra #8 – A consensus All-American during the 1956 and 1957 seasons, Charlie Tyra led the University of Louisville to its first NIT title in 1956 and was named the tournament's MVP for his performance. Tyra was named Helms Athletic Foundation All-American in his junior and senior years. One of only five Cardinals to record over 1,000 rebounds in his career, Tyra ranks as the all-time rebounder in U of L history with 1,617. During the 1955–56 season, Tyra pulled down 645 rebounds, a mark that has been bettered by only three other players in NCAA history. He set the Louisville record for most rebounds in a game when he pulled down 38 against Canisius during the 1955–56 season. In his four seasons with Louisville, he helped his teams to a combined record of 88–23 and three straight NIT appearances. Tyra ranks third in career free throws made (448), second in career rebounding average (17.0), fourth in career scoring average (18.2), eighth in career scorers (1,728 points) and eighth in field goals made (640). Tyra is one of only four players in UofL history to score 40 points or more in a game (achieved against Notre Dame when he hit 12 of 16 field goals and all 16 of his free throw attempts). Tyra died on December 29, 2006, at the age of 71. He was drafted #2 by in the Detroit Pistons in the 1957 NBA draft.
- Wes Unseld #31 – When Wes Unseld ended his career with the University of Louisville following the 1967–68 season, he left as the Cardinals' all-time leading scorer for a three-year player. Today, Unseld ranks 10th on the all-time scoring list, but his career point total of 1,686 is still tops for a three-year player. A consensus All-American during his junior and senior years, Unseld is one of only five other Cardinal players to pull down over 1,000 rebounds in his career. His 1,551 career rebounds ranks second behind Tyra's 1,617. Unseld began his senior season with a 45-point effort against Georgetown College, a UofL record that still stands today. Unseld, chosen as second player overall in the NBA draft by Baltimore, was honored on the All-Missouri Valley Conference team all three years at UofL and the Cardinals were 60–22 during his three seasons. During his junior year, Unseld led the Cardinals to a final No. 2 ranking in both wire service polls. Unseld's 20.6 scoring average still ranks as the top scoring average in Louisville history. His 18.9 rebounding average also ranks as the top average for a Cardinal. While playing on the Cardinals' freshmen team, Unseld averaged 35.8 points and 23.6 rebounds, and hit 68.6 percent from the field.
- Darrell Griffith #35 – The 1980 Player of the Year and consensus first team All-American led Louisville to four consecutive NCAA tournament appearances, winning the 1980 Championship as he had promised when he committed to his hometown Cardinals. Griffith's career 2333 points and single-season 825 points rank first in Louisville history. He scored in double figures in 41 straight games and 111 of his 126 games with the Cardinals. His play earned him the nickname "Dr. Dunkenstein". He was drafted #2 by the Utah Jazz in the 1980 NBA draft.
- Pervis Ellison #42 – Ellison won the 1986 NCAA Tournament MOP award after leading the Cardinals to their second NCAA Tournament Championship. A consensus first team All-American in 1989, he is the only Louisville player to score 2000 points and grab 1000 rebounds in a career. His 374 career rejections rank first at Louisville and ranked Ellison third all time in the NCAA when he left in 1989. He was drafted #1 by the Sacramento Kings in the 1989 NBA draft.
- Russ Smith #2 – Smith, the Cardinals' all-time steals leader with 275 and also fifth in career scoring with 1,908 points, was a consensus first-team All-American in 2013–14 after receiving third-team All-American honors from the National Association of Basketball Coaches and Sporting News in 2012–13, when the Cardinals won their since-vacated third national title. His number retirement ceremony was held at Louisville's January 22, 2022, home game against Notre Dame. The number is being worn by Sam Bearden in the 2021–22 season, but will not be issued in future seasons.

=== Cardinals in the Hall of Fame ===
Louisville has three representatives in the Naismith Memorial Basketball Hall of Fame: Cardinal All-American and former Washington Bullets All-Star Wes Unseld, who was inducted in 1988, former coach Denny Crum, who was inducted in 1994, and coach Rick Pitino, who was inducted in 2013. Darrell Griffith, a national player of the year and consensus All-American at the University of Louisville, is part of the 2014 induction class for the National Collegiate Basketball Hall of Fame.

=== National Player of the Year awards ===
- 1980 – Darrell Griffith (John R. Wooden Award)

=== All-Americans ===
Twenty one Louisville players have earned 25 All American selections. 7 players received 8 consensus All-American selections.

==== Consensus selections ====
- 1957– Charlie Tyra
- 1967– Wes Unseld
- 1968– Wes Unseld
- 1972– Jim Price
- 1980– Darrell Griffith
- 1989– Pervis Ellison
- 1994– Clifford Rozier
- 2014– Russ Smith

==== Other selections ====
- 1956– Charlie Tyra
- 1959– Don Goldstein
- 1961– John Turner
- 1966– Wes Unseld
- 1969– Butch Beard
- 1975– Junior Bridgeman & Allen Murphy
- 1976– Phil Bond
- 1977– Wesley Cox
- 1978– Rick Wilson
- 1979– Darrell Griffith
- 1984– Lancaster Gordon
- 1997– DeJuan Wheat
- 2003– Reece Gaines
- 2005– Francisco Garcia
- 2009– Terrence Williams
- 2013– Russ Smith
- 2020– Jordan Nwora

=== Other major national awards ===
- 2013 – Peyton Siva (Frances Pomeroy Naismith Award – top Division I senior no taller than 6 feet/1.83 m)
- 2014 – Russ Smith (Frances Pomeroy Naismith Award)
- 2015 – Montrezl Harrell (Karl Malone Award)

=== Honored jerseys ===
Louisville has honored the jerseys of 21 former players. Their numbers remain active.

Honored Jerseys
Number	Player	Position	Years
14	Alfred "Butch" Beard	Guard	1966–69
10	Ulysses "Junior" Bridgeman	Guard/Forward	1972–75
16	Jack Coleman	Forward/Center	1946–49
24	Don Goldstein	Forward	1956–59
4	Lancaster Gordon	Guard	1980–84
13	George Hauptfuhrer	Center	1944–46
20	Bob Lochmueller	Forward	1949–52
22	Rodney McCray	Forward/Center	1979–83
12	Jim Morgan	Guard	1953–57
20	Allen Murphy	Guard/Forward	1972–75
16	Chuck Noble	Forward/Guard	1950–54
13	Bud Olsen	Center	1959–62
15	Jim Price	Guard	1969–72
13	Kenny Reeves	Guard	1946–50
9	Phil Rollins	Guard	1952–56
43	Derek Smith	Guard/Forward	1978–82
55	Billy Thompson	Forward	1982–86
22	John Turner	Forward	1958–61
20	Milt Wagner	Guard	1981–86
32	DeJuan Wheat	Guard	1993–97
45	Donovan Mitchell	Guard	2015–17

=== Conference Player of the Year ===
==== Key ====
†	Co-Players of the Year
Player (X)	Denotes the number of times the player has been awarded the Player of the Year award at that point

Missouri Valley Conference Player of the Year
Season	Player	Position	Class
1973–74	Junior Bridgeman	SF	Junior
1974–75	Junior Bridgeman (2)	SF	Senior
Metro Conference Player of the Year
Season	Player	Position	Class
1977–78^{†}	Rick Wilson	SG/PG	Senior
1979–80	Darrell Griffith	SG	Senior
1980–81^{†}	Derek Smith	SG	Junior
1982–83	Rodney McCray	SF	Senior
1986–87	Herbert Crook	SF/SG	Junior
1987–88^{†}	Pervis Ellison	C	Junior
1992–93	Clifford Rozier	C	Sophomore
1993–94	Clifford Rozier (2)	C	Junior

=== Conference Tournament Most Outstanding Player ===
Metro Conference tournament Most Outstanding Player
Season	Player	Position	Class
1978	Rick Wilson	SG/PG	Senior
1980	Darrell Griffith	SG	Senior
1981	Rodney McCray	SF	Sophomore
1983	Rodney McCray(2)	SF	Senior
1986	Pervis Ellison	C	Freshman
1988	Herbert Crook	SF	Senior
1989	Pervis Ellison(2)	C	Senior
1990	LaBradford Smith	SG	Junior
1991	LaBradford Smith(2)	SG	Senior
1993	Dwayne Morton	SF	Sophomore
1994	Clifford Rozier	C	Junior
1995	DeJuan Wheat	PG	Sophomore
Conference USA Tournament Most Outstanding Player
Season	Player	Position	Class
2003	Luke Whitehead	SF	Junior
2005	Taquan Dean	SG/PG	Junior
Big East Conference tournament Most Outstanding Player
Season	Player	Position	Class
2012	Peyton Siva	PG	Junior
2013	Peyton Siva	PG	Senior
American Athletic Conference tournament Most Valuable Player
Season	Player	Position	Class
2014	Russ Smith	SG/PG	Senior

=== 1000-point scorers ===
As of 2015, Louisville has 67 1000-point career scorers, second only to North Carolina for most all time.

=== Cardinals in the pros ===
The Cardinals have had 75 players taken in the NBA draft, the most recent being Ray Spalding, who was chosen in the 2018 NBA draft, and Donovan Mitchell, who was chosen in the 2017 NBA draft. 30 former Cardinal players are playing professional basketball, with six of those currently playing in the NBA.

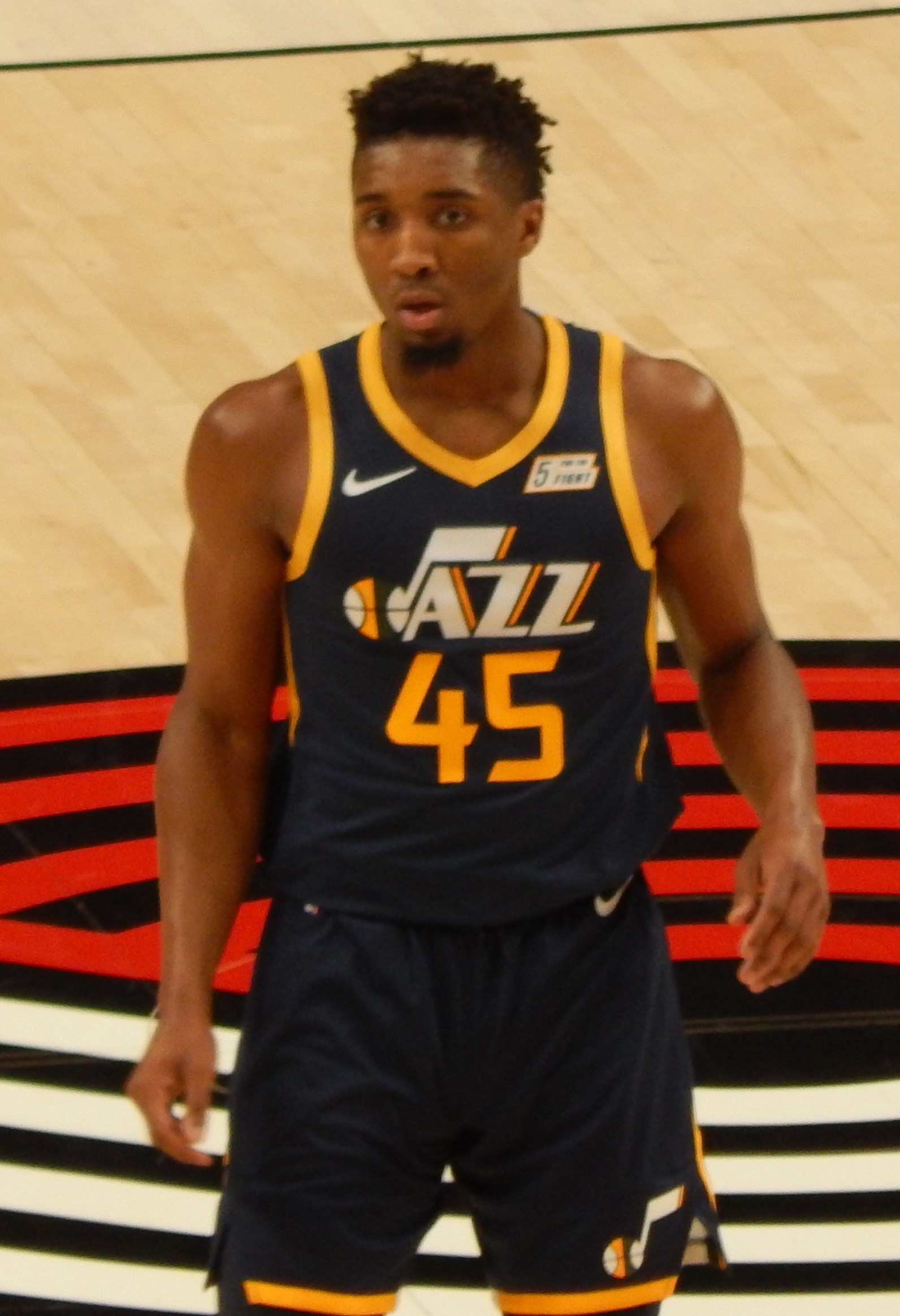
Donovan Mitchell is one of five former Cardinals playing in the NBA in 2020

Name	League	Team
Deng Adel	(United States) NBA G League	Long Island Nets
Chane Behanan	(Puerto Rico) BSN	Santeros de Aguada
Wayne Blackshear	(United States) NBA G League	Maine Red Claws
Rakeem Buckles	(France) LNB Pro B	Lille Métropole BC
Earl Clark	(Spain) Liga ACB	San Pablo Burgos
Taquan Dean	(France) LNB Pro A	Élan Béarnais Pau-Lacq-Orthez
Nouha Diakite	(France) LNB Pro B	Lille Métropole BC
Gorgui Dieng	(United States) NBA	Memphis Grizzlies
Anton Gill	(Finland) Koripallon I-divisioona	Koiviston Kipinä Basket
Montrezl Harrell	(United States) NBA	Philadelphia 76ers
Terence Jennings	(Bulgaria) NBL	Beroe
Jaylen Johnson	(United States) NBA G League	Iowa Wolves
V.J. King	(United States) NBA G-League	Westchester Knicks
Preston Knowles	(Thailand) ASEAN League	Mono Vampire
Kyle Kuric	(Spain) Liga ACB	FC Barcelona Lassa
Damion Lee	(United States) NBA	Phoenix Suns
Trey Lewis	(Israel) Premier League	Maccabi Rishon LeZion
Mangok Mathiang	(Israel) Premier League	Hapoel Eilat
Donovan Mitchell	(United States) NBA	Cleveland Cavaliers
Alhaji Mohammed	(Tunisia) Championnat National A	US Monastir
Jordan Nwora	(United States) NBA	Milwaukee Bucks
Larry O'Bannon	(Argentina) LNB	Hispano Americano
Chinanu Onuaku	(United States) NBA G League	Greensboro Swarm
Juan Palacios	(Spain) Liga ACB	Movistar Estudiantes
Terry Rozier	(United States) NBA	Charlotte Hornets
Samardo Samuels	(France) LNB Pro A	Chorale Roanne
Peyton Siva	(Germany) Bundesliga	Alba Berlin
Chris Smith	(Israel) Premier League	Hapoel Jerusalem
Jerry Smith	(Greece) GBL	Ifaistos Limnou
Russ Smith	(Israel) Premier League	Hapoel Be'er Sheva
Quentin Snider	(Netherlands) DBL	Feyenoord
Édgar Sosa	(Israel) Premier League	Hapoel Gilboa Galil
Ray Spalding	(United States) NBA G League	Greensboro Swarm
Kevin Ware	(Finland) Korisliiga	Korihait

Several other former players have played in the NBA, including:

- Butch Beard
- Junior Bridgeman
- Jack Coleman
- Wesley Cox
- Pervis Ellison
- Lancaster Gordon
- Darrell Griffith
- Rodney McCray
- Scooter McCray
- Greg Minor
- Dwayne Morton
- Kenny Payne
- Jim Price
- Clifford Rozier
- Derek Smith
- LaBradford Smith
- Felton Spencer
- Barry Sumpter
- Billy Thompson
- Charlie Tyra
- Wes Unseld
- Milt Wagner
- Samaki Walker
- Rick Wilson
- Francisco García
- Terrence Williams

== Facilities ==
=== Home courts ===
==== KFC Yum! Center (2010–present) ====
Since the 2010–11 season the Cardinals have played their home games at the KFC Yum! Center located along the banks of the Ohio River in downtown Louisville. As of February 7, 2017, Louisville has a 114–14 record (.891) in 6 seasons in the KFC Yum! Center.

The facility has a seating capacity of 22,090 with 71 suites and 62 loge boxes. It is the third-largest in the nation (behind only Syracuse's Carrier Dome, Tennessee's Thompson-Boling Arena, and Kentucky's Rupp Arena). Louisville ranked among the top 3 in attendance in the first three seasons at the KFC Yum! Center. The attendance record of 22,815 was set on March 9, 2013, against #24 Notre Dame.

The playing surface at the KFC Yum! Center is named Denny Crum Court in honor of Hall of Fame coach Denny Crum. The University of Louisville first renamed its home court after Crum in January 2007.

Since the opening of the KFC Yum Center, the University of Louisville has become the most valuable college basketball team in the nation. In 2012 the Cardinals were worth $36.1 million, up nearly 40% from two years earlier, before the Yum Center opened.

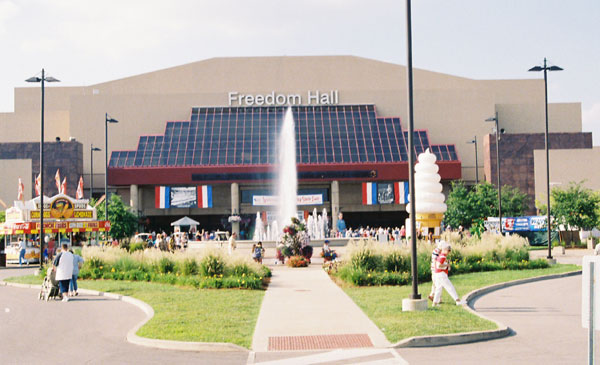
Freedom Hall at the Kentucky Fair and Exposition Center

==== Freedom Hall (1956–2010) ====
From 1956 to the completion of the KFC Yum! Center in 2010, the Cardinals played their home games at Freedom Hall. Louisville had a 664–136 record in 54 seasons in Freedom Hall (.83 winning percentage). Freedom Hall has been the site of six NCAA Final Fours, four additional NCAA events and 10 conference tournaments. ESPN College Basketball magazine once named Freedom Hall as the nation's "Best Playing Floor."

Louisville ranked among the top 10 nationally in average home attendance at Freedom Hall for 31 years, including the last 28 in the nation's top five (19,397 in 2009–10, third in the nation). In 2010, a new Freedom Hall attendance record was set when 20,135 fans witnessed the Cardinals defeat the #1 ranked Syracuse Orange in the final University of Louisville game in the arena.

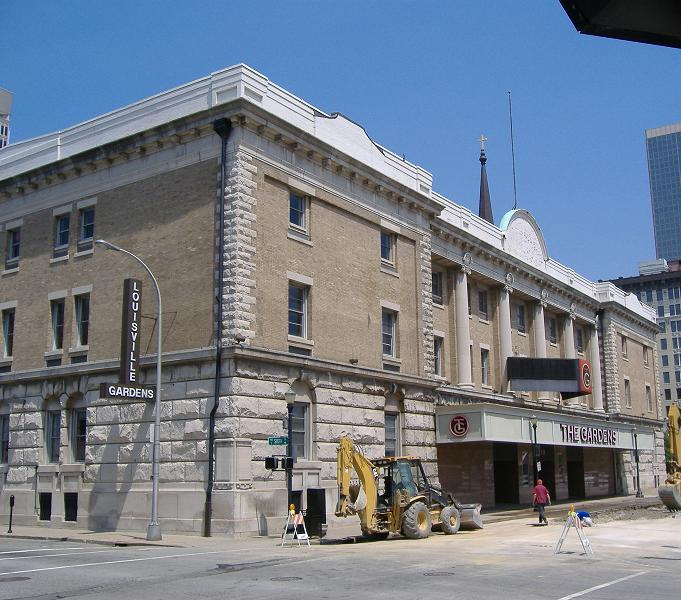
Jefferson County Armory as it was September 5, 2007, now named the Louisville Gardens

==== Jefferson County Armory (1945–1972) ====
Jefferson County Armory was the primary home of Louisville Cardinals basketball starting in 1945 when Bernard "Peck" Hickman was head coach until the 1957–58 season, when Freedom Hall became their primary home game site. The Cardinals played 10 of their home games in the Jefferson County Armory in 1956–57 and three games in Freedom Hall. Louisville played one game at the armory in 1958–59.In the 1960s the armory was renamed the Louisville Convention Center. The Cardinals played two games at the Convention Center in 1963–64 and three games in the Convention Center in 1964–65. The last game the Cardinals played there was November 30, 1972. Louisville was 153–23 all time at the Jefferson County Armory which is now named the Louisville Gardens.

==== Belknap Gymnasium (1931–1944) ====
After playing home games at numerous venues in its early years, the Cardinals moved to the newly constructed Belknap Gymnasium in 1931. The gym housed 600 bleacher seats and the baskets were mounted directly to the wall. Louisville compiled a 56–35 (.615 winning percentage) before moving to the Jefferson County Armory. The gym was razed in 1993 to make way for Lutz Hall.

=== Practice facilities ===
==== Planet Fitness-Kueber Center (2007–present) ====
Since 2007 the Cardinals have practiced at the $15.2 million, 60,000 square feet (5,600 m^{2}) Planet Fitness-Kueber Center on campus. The Planet Fitness-Kueber Center houses the teams basketball offices, practice facilities, film room and training areas.

The facility was named the Yum! Center, until December 2018 when local businessmen Rick and David Kueber donated $3 million to rename the facility.

== Controversies and scandals ==
=== 1956 recruiting violations ===
In 1956 the team was placed on probation for two years by the NCAA, including bans on postseason play, due to recruiting violations.

=== 2015 sex scandal ===
A former Louisville player, and then Director of Basketball Operations, Andre McGee, arranged and paid for strippers and prostitutes to perform striptease dances and sexual acts for 17 prospective and former basketball players from 2010 to 2014. On October 3, 2015, the book publisher IBJ Custom Publishing released a book entitled "Breaking Cardinal Rules." Based on revelations provided by the local self-described escort, Katina Powell, the book detailed striptease dances and acts of prostitution that Powell and McGee arranged and organized in Minardi Hall over approximately a four-year period.

During the investigation of the allegations, the university self-imposed a ban on the 2016 NCAA tournament. In June 2016, the NCAA announced that the university would lose four basketball scholarships over the course of four seasons, but there would be no further postseason ban. The NCAA suspended head coach Rick Pitino for five ACC games during the 2017–18 season. The NCAA also ordered the university to vacate all wins from 2011 to 2014 that include ineligible players. The vacated wins include a Final Four appearance in 2012 and an NCAA Tournament Championship in 2013. Luke Hancock's 2013 Final Four Most Valuable Player Award was reinstated by the NCAA because he was found to be innocent of any NCAA rule violations.

=== 2017–18 NCAA corruption scandal ===
As a result of a corruption scandal implicating various schools including Louisville, on September 27, 2017, Louisville placed head coach Rick Pitino on unpaid administrative leave and athletic director Tom Jurich on paid administrative leave. Rick Pitino and Tom Jurich would then be fired with cause by the university. Two days later, assistant David Padgett, a former star player under Pitino at Louisville, was named as acting head coach.

== See also ==
- Cincinnati–Louisville rivalry
- Kentucky–Louisville rivalry
- Louisville–Memphis rivalry
- List of college men's basketball coaches with 600 wins
