= 1987–88 Memphis State Tigers men's basketball team =

American college basketball season

1987–88 Memphis State Tigers men's basketball

NCAA tournament, second round
- Conference: Metro Conference (1975–1995)
- Record: 20–12 (6–6 Metro)
- Head coach: Larry Finch (2nd season)
- Home arena: Mid-South Coliseum

1987–88 Metro Conference men's basketball standings
	Conf.				Overall
Team	W		L	PCT	W		L	PCT
Louisville †	9	–	3	.750	24	–	11	.686
Florida State	7	–	5	.583	19	–	11	.633
South Carolina	6	–	6	.500	19	–	10	.655
Virginia Tech	6	–	6	.500	19	–	10	.655
Memphis State	6	–	6	.500	20	–	12	.625
Southern Miss	5	–	7	.417	19	–	11	.633
Cincinnati	3	–	9	.250	11	–	17	.393
† 1988 Metro Conference tournament winner Rankings from AP Poll

The 1987–88 Memphis State Tigers men's basketball team represented Memphis State University as a member of the Metro Conference during the 1987–88 NCAA Division I men's basketball season.

The Tigers received an at-large bid to the 1988 NCAA tournament as No. 9 seed in the Midwest region. After an opening round win over No. 9 seed Baylor, the Tigers were beaten by No. 1 seed Purdue to finish with a 20–12 record (6–6 Metro).

== Roster ==
1987–88 Memphis State Tigers men's basketball team
Players
Coaches

Pos.	#	Name	Height	Weight	Year	Hometown
G	10	Sidney Adkins	6 ft 4 in (1.93 m)	185 lb (84 kg)	Jr	Memphis, Tennessee
G	11	John Williams	5 ft 10 in (1.78 m)	165 lb (75 kg)	So	Jackson, Mississippi
G	14	Cheyenne Gibson	6 ft 3 in (1.91 m)	185 lb (84 kg)	So	Memphis, Tennessee
G	15	John McLaughlin	6 ft 5 in (1.96 m)	180 lb (82 kg)	Fr	Monticello, Tennessee
F	30	Ronald McClain	6 ft 8 in (2.03 m)	180 lb (82 kg)	Fr	Horn Lake, Mississippi
G	31	Dwight Boyd	6 ft 3 in (1.91 m)	185 lb (84 kg)	Sr	Memphis, Tennessee
F	32	Russell Young	6 ft 5 in (1.96 m)	205 lb (93 kg)	Fr	LaGrange, Arkansas
G	34	Elliot Perry	6 ft 0 in (1.83 m)	155 lb (70 kg)	Fr	Memphis, Tennessee
F	35	Sylvester Gray	6 ft 6 in (1.98 m)	230 lb (104 kg)	So	Arlington, Tennessee
F	41	Rodney Douglas	6 ft 6 in (1.98 m)	180 lb (82 kg)	Jr	Memphis, Tennessee
C	42	DeWayne Bailey	6 ft 9 in (2.06 m)	225 lb (102 kg)	Sr	Memphis, Tennessee
C	43	Steve Ballard	6 ft 9 in (2.06 m)	210 lb (95 kg)	Jr	Memphis, Tennessee
F	44	Marvin Alexander	6 ft 7 in (2.01 m)	235 lb (107 kg)	Jr	Memphis, Tennessee
C	53	Bret Mundt	6 ft 10 in (2.08 m)	245 lb (111 kg)	Jr	Jackson, Tennessee

Head coach

- Larry Finch (Memphis)

Assistant coach(es)

Legend

- (C) Team captain
- (S) Suspended
- (I) Ineligible
- (W) Walk-on
- Injured
- Current redshirt

Roster

== Schedule and results ==
Date time, TV	Rank^{#}	Opponent^{#}	Result	Record	Site city, state
Regular Season
Nov 28, 1987*		Jackson State	W 78–56	1–0	Mid-South Coliseum; Memphis, Tennessee
Nov 30, 1987*	No. 20	Washington	W 86–57	2–0	Mid-South Coliseum; Memphis, Tennessee
Dec 5, 1987*	No. 20	at Arkansas State	W 60–59	3–0	Convocation Center; Jonesboro, Arkansas
Dec 8, 1987*	No. 20	at Saint Louis	L 50–55	3–1	Kiel Auditorium; St. Louis, Missouri
Dec 12, 1987*	No. 19	No. 9 Missouri	W 76–68	4–1	Mid-South Coliseum; Memphis, Tennessee
Dec 17, 1987*	No. 19	Bradley	W 113–108 ^{OT}	5–1	Mid-South Coliseum; Memphis, Tennessee
Dec 23, 1987*	No. 20	Alcorn State	W 87–64	6–1	Mid-South Coliseum; Memphis, Tennessee
Dec 28, 1987*	No. 20	vs. No. 17 Kansas	L 62–64	6–2	Madison Square Garden; New York, New York
Dec 29, 1987*	No. 19	vs. Marist	W 75–57	7–2	Madison Square Garden; New York, New York
Jan 5, 1988*		Murray State	W 76–70 ^{OT}	8–2	Mid-South Coliseum; Memphis, Tennessee
Jan 9, 1988		at Virginia Tech	L 80–82	8–3 (0–1)	Cassell Coliseum; Blacksburg, Virginia
Jan 13, 1988		at Florida State	L 85–92	8–4 (0–2)	Tallahassee-Leon County Civic Center (7,119); Tallahassee, Florida
Jan 17, 1988*		at Tulsa	W 54–47	9–4	Tulsa Convention Center; Tulsa, Oklahoma
Jan 18, 1988		at South Carolina	L 58–84	9–5 (0–3)	Carolina Coliseum; Columbia, South Carolina
Jan 21, 1988		at Southern Miss	L 96–107	9–6 (0–4)	Reed Green Coliseum; Hattiesburg, Mississippi
Jan 24, 1988*		San Jose State	L 67–82	9–7	Mid-South Coliseum; Memphis, Tennessee
Jan 25, 1988		at Cincinnati	W 75–70 ^{OT}	10–7 (1–4)	Cincinnati Gardens; Cincinnati, Ohio
Jan 30, 1988		Louisville	W 72–68	11–7 (2–4)	Mid-South Coliseum; Memphis, Tennessee
Jan 31, 1988*		Tennessee State	W 67–64	12–7	Mid-South Coliseum; Memphis, Tennessee
Feb 6, 1988*		Arkansas State	L 47–48	12–8	Mid-South Coliseum; Memphis, Tennessee
Feb 10, 1988		No. 16 Southern Miss	W 113–97	13–8 (3–4)	Mid-South Coliseum; Memphis, Tennessee
Feb 13, 1988		South Carolina	W 67–61	14–8 (4–4)	Mid-South Coliseum; Memphis, Tennessee
Feb 20, 1988		Florida State	W 81–76	15–8 (5–4)	Mid-South Coliseum (11,200); Memphis, Tennessee
Feb 23, 1988		at Cincinnati	L 90–106	15–9 (5–5)	Cincinnati Gardens; Cincinnati, Ohio
Feb 27, 1988*		Oral Roberts	W 115–71	16–9	Mid-South Coliseum; Memphis, Tennessee
Feb 29, 1988		at Louisville	L 69–71	16–10 (5–6)	Freedom Hall; Louisville, Kentucky
Mar 5, 1988		Virginia Tech	W 112–104	17–10 (6–6)	Mid-South Coliseum; Memphis, Tennessee
Metro Conference tournament
Mar 11, 1988*	(3)	(6) Southern Miss; Quarterfinals	W 97–84 ^{OT}	18–10	Mid-South Coliseum; Memphis, Tennessee
Mar 12, 1988*	(3)	(2) Florida State; Semifinals	W 81–74	19–10	Mid-South Coliseum; Memphis, Tennessee
Mar 13, 1988*	(3)	(1) Louisville; Championship game	L 73–81	19–11	Mid-South Coliseum; Memphis, Tennessee
NCAA tournament
Mar 17, 1988*	(9 MW)	vs. (8 MW) Baylor; First Round	W 75–60	20–11	Joyce Center; South Bend, Indiana
Mar 19, 1988*; CBS	(9 MW)	vs. (1 MW) No. 3 Purdue; Second Round	L 73–100	20–12	Joyce Center; South Bend, Indiana
*Non-conference game. ^{#}Rankings from AP Poll. (#) Tournament seedings in parentheses. W=West. All times are in Eastern Time.
