= 1987–88 Florida State Seminoles men's basketball team =

American college basketball season

1987–88 Florida State Seminoles men's basketball

NCAA tournament, First round
- Conference: Metro Conference (1975–1995)
- Record: 19–11 (7–5 Metro)
- Head coach: Pat Kennedy (2nd season)
- Assistant coaches: David Zimroth; Rich Petriccione; Tom Carlson
- Home arena: Tallahassee-Leon County Civic Center

1987–88 Metro Conference men's basketball standings
	Conf.				Overall
Team	W		L	PCT	W		L	PCT
Louisville †	9	–	3	.750	24	–	11	.686
Florida State	7	–	5	.583	19	–	11	.633
South Carolina	6	–	6	.500	19	–	10	.655
Virginia Tech	6	–	6	.500	19	–	10	.655
Memphis State	6	–	6	.500	20	–	12	.625
Southern Miss	5	–	7	.417	19	–	11	.633
Cincinnati	3	–	9	.250	11	–	17	.393
† 1988 Metro Conference tournament winner Rankings from AP Poll

The 1987–88 Florida State Seminoles men's basketball team represented Florida State University in the program's final season as members of the Metro Conference during the 1987–88 NCAA Division I men's basketball season. Led by head coach Pat Kennedy, the Seminoles reached the NCAA tournament as the No. 12 seed in the West region. Florida State was beaten in the first round by No. 5 seed Iowa. The team finished with an overall record of 19–11 (7–5 Metro).

== Roster ==
1987–88 Florida State Seminoles men's basketball team
Players
Coaches

Pos.	#	Name	Height	Weight	Year	Previous school	Hometown
G	11	Derrick Mitchell	6 ft 3 in (1.91 m)	190 lb (86 kg)	Jr	Raines	Jacksonville, Florida
G	12	Joey Barnes	6 ft 2 in (1.88 m)	160 lb (73 kg)	Fr	Shanks	Quincy, Florida
G	14	Brad Johnson	6 ft 6 in (1.98 m)	195 lb (88 kg)	Fr	Owen	Black Mountain, North Carolina
F	20	Aubry Boyd	6 ft 6 in (1.98 m)	175 lb (79 kg)	Fr	Southwest	Macon, Georgia
G	21	George McCloud	6 ft 6 in (1.98 m)	205 lb (93 kg)	Jr	Mainland	Daytona Beach, Florida
G	22	Tharon Mayes	6 ft 3 in (1.91 m)	170 lb (77 kg)	So	Hillhouse	New Haven, Connecticut
F	24	Tony Dawson	6 ft 7 in (2.01 m)	205 lb (93 kg)	Jr	Gulf Coast CC	Kinston, North Carolina
F	31	David White	6 ft 6 in (1.98 m)	225 lb (102 kg)	Fr	Boca Ciega	St. Petersburg, Florida
C	34	William Hunter	6 ft 7 in (2.01 m)	220 lb (100 kg)	Jr	Tate	Cantonment, Florida
F	45	Michael Polite	6 ft 7 in (2.01 m)	215 lb (98 kg)	Fr	Mainland	Daytona Beach, Florida

Head coach

- Pat Kennedy (King's College)

Assistant coach(es)

- Rich Petriccione
- David Zimroth
- Tom Carlson

Legend

- (C) Team captain
- (S) Suspended
- (I) Ineligible
- (W) Walk-on
- Injured
- Current redshirt

== Schedule ==
Date time, TV	Rank^{#}	Opponent^{#}	Result	Record	Site city, state
Regular Season
Nov 28, 1987*		Bucknell	W 87–58	1–0	Tallahassee-Leon County Civic Center (4,128); Tallahassee, Florida
Dec 2, 1987*		Florida International	W 121–75	2–0	Tallahassee-Leon County Civic Center (5,108); Tallahassee, Florida
Dec 5, 1987*		Penn State	W 63–60	3–0	Tallahassee-Leon County Civic Center (5,717); Tallahassee, Florida
Dec 10, 1987*		No. 16 Oklahoma	L 87–89	3–1	Tallahassee-Leon County Civic Center (7,219); Tallahassee, Florida
Dec 12, 1987*		at No. 12 Florida; Rivalry	L 48–71	3–2	Stephen C. O'Connell Center (10,550); Gainesville, Florida
Dec 16, 1987*		vs. Stetson; Citrus Classic	W 80–67	4–2	(5,120); Orlando, Florida
Dec 19, 1987*		at Tennessee	L 78–81 ^{OT}	4–3	Thompson-Boling Arena (11,178); Knoxville, Tennessee
Dec 21, 1987*		Hardin-Simmons	W 93–79	5–3	Tallahassee-Leon County Civic Center (3,271); Tallahassee, Florida
Dec 28, 1987*		vs. No. 3 Pittsburgh; Red Lobster Classic	L 71–72	5–4	Orange County Civic Center (6,200); Orlando, Florida
Dec 29, 1987*		at Central Florida; Red Lobster Classic	W 101–67	6–4	Orange County Civic Center (3,500); Orlando, Florida
Jan 6, 1988*		Jacksonville	W 87–63	7–4	Tallahassee-Leon County Civic Center (6,219); Tallahassee, Florida
Jan 9, 1988		Louisville	W 83–76	8–4 (1–0)	Tallahassee-Leon County Civic Center (12,898); Tallahassee, Florida
Jan 13, 1988		Memphis State	W 92–85	9–4 (2–0)	Tallahassee-Leon County Civic Center (7,119); Tallahassee, Florida
Jan 16, 1988*		at South Florida	W 86–70	10–4	USF Sun Dome (7,972); Tampa, Florida
Jan 23, 1988		at Cincinnati	W 74–71	11–4 (3–0)	Cincinnati Gardens (5,057); Cincinnati, Ohio
Jan 25, 1988		South Carolina	L 72–80	11–5 (3–1)	Tallahassee-Leon County Civic Center (7,246); Tallahassee, Florida
Jan 28, 1988*		Central Florida	W 93–69	12–5	Tallahassee-Leon County Civic Center (4,181); Tallahassee, Florida
Jan 30, 1988		at Virginia Tech	L 87–88	12–6 (3–2)	Cassell Coliseum (9,712); Blacksburg, Virginia
Feb 2, 1988*		Monmouth	W 82–68	13–6	Tallahassee-Leon County Civic Center (2,968); Tallahassee, Florida
Feb 6, 1988		Cincinnati	W 101–68	14–6 (4–2)	Tallahassee-Leon County Civic Center (6,183); Tallahassee, Florida
Feb 13, 1988		Southern Miss	W 83–75	15–6 (5–2)	Tallahassee-Leon County Civic Center (6,943); Tallahassee, Florida
Feb 17, 1988		at Louisville	L 62–82	15–7 (5–3)	Freedom Hall (19,286); Louisville, Kentucky
Feb 20, 1988		at Memphis State	L 76–81	15–8 (5–4)	Mid-South Coliseum (11,200); Memphis, Tennessee
Feb 24, 1988*		Alabama State	W 108–90	16–8	Tallahassee-Leon County Civic Center (3,893); Tallahassee, Florida
Feb 27, 1988		at South Carolina	L 78–81	16–9 (5–5)	Carolina Coliseum (8,212); Columbia, South Carolina
Mar 2, 1988		Virginia Tech	W 92–79	17–9 (6–5)	Tallahassee-Leon County Civic Center (6,686); Tallahassee, Florida
Mar 5, 1988		at Southern Miss	W 87–83	18–9 (7–5)	Reed Green Coliseum (8,095); Hattiesburg, Mississippi
Metro Conference tournament
Mar 11, 1988*	(2)	vs. (7) Cincinnati; Quarterfinals	W 84–74	19–9	Mid-South Coliseum (11,200); Memphis, Tennessee
Mar 12, 1988*	(2)	at (3) Memphis State; Semifinals	L 74–81	19–10	Mid-South Coliseum (11,200); Memphis, Tennessee
NCAA tournament
Mar 18, 1988*	(12 W)	vs. (5 W) No. 17 Iowa; First Round	L 98–102	19–11	Pauley Pavilion (9,500); Los Angeles, California
*Non-conference game. ^{#}Rankings from AP Poll. (#) Tournament seedings in parentheses. W=West. All times are in Eastern.
