= 1987–88 Southern Miss Golden Eagles basketball team =

American college basketball season

1987–88 Southern Miss Golden Eagles men's basketball

NIT, Second Round
- Conference: Metro Conference (1975–1995)
- Record: 19–11 (5–7 Metro)
- Head coach: M. K. Turk (12th season)
- Home arena: Reed Green Coliseum

1987–88 Metro Conference men's basketball standings
| | Conf. | | | | Overall |
| Team | W | | L | PCT | W | | L | PCT |
|---|---|---|---|---|---|---|---|---|
| Louisville † | 9 | – | 3 | .750 | 24 | – | 11 | .686 |
| Florida State | 7 | – | 5 | .583 | 19 | – | 11 | .633 |
| South Carolina | 6 | – | 6 | .500 | 19 | – | 10 | .655 |
| Virginia Tech | 6 | – | 6 | .500 | 19 | – | 10 | .655 |
| Memphis State | 6 | – | 6 | .500 | 20 | – | 12 | .625 |
| Southern Miss | 5 | – | 7 | .417 | 19 | – | 11 | .633 |
| Cincinnati | 3 | – | 9 | .250 | 11 | – | 17 | .393 |
† 1988 Metro Conference tournament winner Rankings from AP Poll

The 1987–88 Southern Miss Golden Eagles basketball team represented University of Southern Mississippi in the 1987–88 college basketball season.

== Roster ==
1987–88 Southern Miss Golden Eagles men's basketball team
Players
Coaches

| Pos. | # | Name | Height | Weight | Year | Hometown |
|---|---|---|---|---|---|---|
| F | | Derreck Hamilton | 6 ft 7 in (2.01 m) | 225 lb (102 kg) | Sr | Mobile, Alabama |
| F | | Randolph Keys | 6 ft 7 in (2.01 m) | 195 lb (88 kg) | Sr | Collins, Mississippi |
| G | | Casey Fisher | 6 ft 2 in (1.88 m) | — | Sr |
| F | | John White | 6 ft 7 in (2.01 m) | — | Sr |
| G | | Randy Pettus | 6 ft 0 in (1.83 m) | — | Jr |
| C | | Willie Brown | 6 ft 7 in (2.01 m) | — | Jr |
| F | | Jurado Hinton | 6 ft 6 in (1.98 m) | — | Jr |
| C | | Roger Boyd | 6 ft 10 in (2.08 m) | — | So |
| G | | Darrin Chancellor | 6 ft 5 in (1.96 m) | — | Fr |
| G | | Jerome Jones | 6 ft 4 in (1.93 m) | — | Fr |
| G | | Jimmy Smith | 6 ft 5 in (1.96 m) | — | Jr |
| F | | Louis Bates | 6 ft 6 in (1.98 m) | — | Fr |
| F | | Allen Chapman | 6 ft 6 in (1.98 m) | — | Jr |
| G | | Jay Ladner | 6 ft 1 in (1.85 m) | — | Jr | Hattiesburg, Mississippi |
| G | | Charlie Sullivan | 6 ft 3 in (1.91 m) | — | Fr |
| F | | D. J. Bowe | 6 ft 7 in (2.01 m) | — | Jr |

Head coach

- M. K. Turk

Assistant coach(es)

Legend

- (C) Team captain
- (S) Suspended
- (I) Ineligible
- (W) Walk-on
- Injured
- Current redshirt

Roster

== Schedule and results ==
| Date time, TV | Rank^{#} | Opponent^{#} | Result | Record | Site city, state |
Non-conference regular season
| Dec 2, 1987* | | McNeese State | W 107–74 | 1–0 | Reed Green Coliseum; Hattiesburg, Mississippi |
| Dec 15, 1987* | | at Clemson | W 88–85 | 2–0 | Littlejohn Coliseum; Clemson, South Carolina |
| Dec 17, 1987* | | at Kansas State | W 71–69 | 3–0 | Ahearn Field House (9,500); Manhattan, Kansas |
| Dec 19, 1987* | | vs. North Texas State | W 83–80 | 4–0 | |
| Dec 22, 1987* | | Jackson State | W 93–68 | 5–0 | Reed Green Coliseum; Hattiesburg, Mississippi |
| Dec 27, 1987* | | vs. Southwest Missouri State; First Tulsa Classic | W 89–82 ^{OT} | 6–0 | Tulsa Convention Center (7,725); Tulsa, Oklahoma |
| Dec 28, 1987* | | at Tulsa; First Tulsa Classic | L 81–82 | 6–1 | Tulsa Convention Center; Tulsa, Oklahoma |
Metro Conference regular season
| Jan 4, 1988 | | at Cincinnati | L 94–103 | 6–2 (0–1) | Cincinnati Gardens; Cincinnati, Ohio |
| Jan 7, 1988* | | UC Riverside | W 98–79 | 7–2 | Reed Green Coliseum; Hattiesburg, Mississippi |
| Jan 9, 1988 | | South Carolina | W 84–69 | 8–2 (1–1) | Reed Green Coliseum; Hattiesburg, Mississippi |
| Jan 11, 1988* | | Kansas State | W 91–89 ^{OT} | 9–2 | Reed Green Coliseum (7,512); Hattiesburg, Mississippi |
| Jan 14, 1988* | | Arkansas State | W 81–71 | 10–2 | Reed Green Coliseum; Hattiesburg, Mississippi |
| Jan 16, 1988 | | Virginia Tech | W 127–102 | 11–2 (2–1) | Reed Green Coliseum; Hattiesburg, Mississippi |
| Jan 18, 1988* | | at South Alabama | W 61–55 | 12–2 | Jaguar Gym; Mobile, Alabama |
| Jan 21, 1988 | | Memphis State | W 107–96 | 13–2 (3–1) | Reed Green Coliseum; Hattiesburg, Mississippi |
| Jan 23, 1988* | | Chattanooga | W 98–84 | 14–2 | Reed Green Coliseum; Hattiesburg, Mississippi |
| Jan 28, 1988 | No. 20 | Louisville | W 95–92 | 15–2 (4–1) | Reed Green Coliseum; Hattiesburg, Mississippi |
| Jan 30, 1988 | No. 20 | at South Carolina | L 78–97 | 15–3 (4–2) | Carolina Coliseum; Columbia, South Carolina |
| Feb 6, 1988 | | at Virginia Tech | L 133–141 ^{2OT} | 15–4 (4–3) | Cassell Coliseum; Blacksburg, Virginia |
| Feb 10, 1988 | No. 16 | at Memphis State | L 97–113 | 15–5 (4–4) | Mid-South Coliseum; Memphis, Tennessee |
| Feb 13, 1988 | | at Florida State | L 75–83 | 15–6 (4–5) | Tallahassee-Leon County Civic Center (6,943); Tallahassee, Florida |
| Feb 16, 1988* | | Southwestern Louisiana | W 100–86 | 16–6 | Reed Green Coliseum; Hattiesburg, Mississippi |
| Feb 22, 1988* | No. 18 | at Northeast Louisiana | L 87–95 | 16–7 | Fant–Ewing Coliseum; Monroe, Louisiana |
| Feb 24, 1988 | No. 18 | at Louisville | L 84–94 | 16–8 (4–6) | Freedom Hall; Louisville, Kentucky |
| Feb 27, 1988* | No. 18 | at Southeastern Louisiana | W 85–70 | 17–8 | Pride Roofing University Center; Hammond, Louisiana |
| Mar 2, 1988 | | Cincinnati | W 104–85 | 18–8 (5–6) | Reed Green Coliseum; Hattiesburg, Mississippi |
| Mar 5, 1988 | | Florida State | L 83–87 | 18–9 (5–7) | Reed Green Coliseum (8,095); Hattiesburg, Mississippi |
Metro Conference tournament
| Mar 11, 1988* | (6) | at (3) Memphis State; Quarterfinals | L 84–97 ^{OT} | 18–10 | Mid-South Coliseum; Memphis, Tennessee |
NIT
| Mar 18, 1988* | | Clemson; First Round | W 74–69 | 19–10 | Reed Green Coliseum; Hattiesburg, Mississippi |
| Mar 23, 1988* | | at VCU; Second Round | L 89–93 | 19–11 | Richmond Coliseum; Richmond, Virginia |
*Non-conference game. ^{#}Rankings from AP poll. (#) Tournament seedings in parentheses. All times are in Central Time.
