= Don Goldstein =

American basketball player (1937–2022)

Personal information
- Born: 1937
- Died: May 27, 2022 (aged 84) Jupiter, Florida, U.S.
- Listed height: 6 ft 5 in (1.96 m)
- Listed weight: 190 lb (86 kg)

Career information
- High school: Tilden (Brooklyn, New York)
- College: Louisville (1956–1959)
- NBA draft: 1959: 2nd round, 8th overall pick
- Drafted by: Detroit Pistons
- Position: Forward
- Stats at Basketball Reference
Medals
Representing United States
Men's basketball
Pan American Games
Gold medal – first place	1959 Chicago	Team competition

Donald Goldstein (1937 – May 27, 2022), known as "Red", was an American college All-American and Pan American Games champion basketball player.

== Early life ==
Goldstein was Jewish. His mother died when he was four. He grew up poor, in the Brooklyn ghetto of Brownsville, and attended Flatbush's Samuel J. Tilden High School, where he was an all-city basketball player and graduated in 1955.

== College and Pan American Games ==
He attended the University of Louisville on a scholarship that paid for room, board, and books, and played forward for the school from 1956 to 1959. He was 6 ft 5 in (1.96 m), and 190 pounds (86 kg). He said: "these guys never saw a Jew. They once asked me once with no malice how old I was when they cut off my horns. I never had a bad day [with my teammates]. I never heard one anti-Semitic remark in Louisville. If you could play, that was it."

In 1959, Goldstein was named All-American and led Louisville to its first-ever appearance in the NCAA Final Four. Goldstein averaged 21.4 points and 10.0 rebounds in the NCAA tournament, and was named to the All-Mideast Regional Team and the All-Tournament Team.

That same year, he and his team won a gold medal in basketball at the 1959 Pan American Games.

In his three years at Louisville, Goldstein scored 1,019 points (the 10th Cardinal to score over 1,000 points) and had 838 rebounds (still 10th all-time in school history).

== Draft and later life ==
Goldstein was the first pick in the second round (8th overall) of the Detroit Pistons in 1959, offered a $7,500 ($83,000 in current dollar terms) salary and a $500 ($6,000 in current dollar terms) signing bonus to buy a car, but he did not play in the NBA. Instead, he went to dental school, and was a dentist on Long Island. He lived in Boca Raton, Florida.

== Honors ==
In 1980, he was inducted into the Louisville Hall of Fame. The Basketball Old-Timers of America inducted him into its hall of fame. His jersey was retired in January 2000. In 2012, he was inducted into the New York City Basketball Hall of Fame. He is also a member of the New York State Basketball Hall of Fame. In 2014, he was inducted into the National Jewish Sports Hall of Fame.
