= 1987–88 Louisville Cardinals men's basketball team =

American college basketball season

1987–88 Louisville Cardinals men's basketball

Metro Conference tournament champions Metro Conference regular season champions

NCAA Men's Division I Tournament, Sweet Sixteen
- Conference: Metro Conference (1975–1995)
- Record: 24–11 (9–3 Metro)
- Head coach: Denny Crum (17th season)
- Assistant coach: Wade Houston
- Home arena: Freedom Hall

1987–88 Metro Conference men's basketball standings
	Conf.				Overall
Team	W		L	PCT	W		L	PCT
Louisville †	9	–	3	.750	24	–	11	.686
Florida State	7	–	5	.583	19	–	11	.633
South Carolina	6	–	6	.500	19	–	10	.655
Virginia Tech	6	–	6	.500	19	–	10	.655
Memphis State	6	–	6	.500	20	–	12	.625
Southern Miss	5	–	7	.417	19	–	11	.633
Cincinnati	3	–	9	.250	11	–	17	.393
† 1988 Metro Conference tournament winner Rankings from AP Poll

The 1987–88 Louisville Cardinals men's basketball team represented the University of Louisville in the 1987–88 NCAA Division I men's basketball season. The head coach was Denny Crum and the team finished the season with an overall record of 24–11.

== Roster ==
1987–88 Louisville Cardinals men's basketball team
Players
Coaches

Pos.	#	Name	Height	Weight	Year	Previous school	Hometown
SF	21	Kenny Payne	6 ft 8 in (2.03 m)	195 lb (88 kg)	Jr	Northeast Jones	Laurel, Mississippi
SG	23	LaBradford Smith	6 ft 3 in (1.91 m)	195 lb (88 kg)	Fr	Bay City	Bay City, Texas
F	41	Herbert Crook	6 ft 7 in (2.01 m)	190 lb (86 kg)	Sr	Eastern	Louisville, Kentucky
PF	43	Pervis Ellison	6 ft 9 in (2.06 m)	210 lb (95 kg)	Jr	Savannah	Savannah, Georgia
C	50	Felton Spencer	7 ft 0 in (2.13 m)	255 lb (116 kg)	So	Eastern	Louisville, Kentucky

Head coach

- Denny Crum (UCLA)

Assistant coach(es)

Legend

- (C) Team captain
- (S) Suspended
- (I) Ineligible
- (W) Walk-on
- Injured
- Current redshirt

== Schedule and results ==
Date time, TV	Rank^{#}	Opponent^{#}	Result	Record	Site city, state
Regular season
Dec 5, 1987*	No. 14	vs. Notre Dame; Big Four Classic	L 54–69	0–1	RCA Dome; Indianapolis, Indiana
Dec 12, 1987*		at No. 1 Kentucky; Rivalry	L 75–76	0–2	Rupp Arena; Lexington, KY
Dec 16, 1987*		Cleveland State	W 93–79	1–2	Freedom Hall; Louisville, KY
Dec 19, 1987*		No. 5 Indiana	W 81–69	2–2	Freedom Hall; Louisville, KY
Dec 21, 1987*		Eastern Kentucky	W 87–69	3–2	Freedom Hall; Louisville, KY
Dec 27, 1987*		vs. SMU; Rainbow Classic	W 87–79	4–2	Stan Sheriff Center; Honolulu, HI
Dec 28, 1987*		vs. NC State; Rainbow Classic	L 75–80	4–3	Stan Sheriff Center; Honolulu, HI
Dec 29, 1987*		vs. Mississippi State; Rainbow Classic	W 86–62	5–3	Stan Sheriff Center; Honolulu, HI
Jan 4, 1988*		South Alabama	W 80–69	6–3	Freedom Hall; Louisville, KY
Jan 6, 1988*		Georgia Tech	L 61–62	6–4	Freedom Hall; Louisville, KY
Jan 9, 1988		at Florida State	L 76–83	6–5 (0–1)	Donald L. Tucker Center; Tallahassee, FL
Jan 16, 1988*		UCLA	W 92–79	7–5	Freedom Hall; Louisville, KY
Jan 18, 1988*		Western Kentucky	W 84–71	8–5	Freedom Hall; Louisville, KY
Jan 20, 1988		at Cincinnati	W 91–89	9–5 (1–1)	Cincinnati Gardens; Cincinnati, OH
Jan 23, 1988*		No. 5 Purdue	L 85–91	9–6	Freedom Hall; Louisville, KY
Jan 26, 1988*		at Dayton	W 90–59	10–6	UD Arena; Dayton, OH
Jan 28, 1988*		at No. 20 Southern Miss	L 92–95	10–7 (1–2)	Reed Green Coliseum; Hattiesburg, MS
Jan 30, 1988		at Memphis State	L 68–72	10–8 (1–3)	Mid-South Coliseum; Memphis, TN
Feb 1, 1988		Virginia Tech	W 107–99	11–8 (2–3)	Freedom Hall; Louisville, KY
Feb 3, 1988		South Carolina	W 68–53	12–8 (3–3)	Freedom Hall; Louisville, KY
Feb 6, 1988*		Houston	W 73–69	13–8	Freedom Hall; Louisville, KY
Feb 13, 1988*		at No. 16 NC State	L 89–101	13–9	Reynolds Coliseum; Raleigh, NC
Feb 15, 1988		Cincinnati	W 90–87	14–9 (4–3)	Freedom Hall; Louisville, KY
Feb 17, 1988		Florida State	W 82–62	15–9 (5–3)	Freedom Hall; Louisville, KY
Feb 20, 1988		at South Carolina	W 98–88	16–9 (6–3)	Carolina Coliseum; Columbia, SC
Feb 24, 1988		No. 18 Southern Miss	W 94–84	17–9 (7–3)	Freedom Hall; Louisville, KY
Feb 27, 1988		at Virginia Tech	W 87–82	18–9 (8–3)	Cassell Coliseum; Blacksburg, VA
Feb 29, 1988		Memphis State	W 71–69	19–9 (9–3)	Freedom Hall; Louisville, KY
Mar 2, 1988*		Austin Peay	W 84–78	20–9	Freedom Hall; Louisville, KY
Mar 5, 1988*		at DePaul	L 58–77	20–10	Rosemont Horizon; Rosemont, IL
Metro Conference tournament
Mar 12, 1988*		vs. South Carolina; Semifinal	W 89–57	21–10	Mid-South Coliseum; Memphis, TN
Mar 13, 1988*		at Memphis State; Championship	W 81–73	22–10	Mid-South Coliseum; Memphis, TN
NCAA tournament
Mar 17, 1988*	(5 SE)	vs. (12 SE) Oregon State; First round	W 70–61	23–10	Omni Coliseum; Atlanta, GA
Mar 19, 1988*	(5 SE)	vs. (4 SE) No. 19 BYU; Second round	W 97–76	24–10	Omni Coliseum; Atlanta, GA
Mar 24, 1988*	(5 SE)	vs. (1 SE) No. 4 Oklahoma; Regional semifinal	L 98–108	24–11	BJCC Arena; Birmingham, AL
*Non-conference game. ^{#}Rankings from AP. (#) Tournament seedings in parentheses. SE=Southeast. All times are in EST.

== Team players drafted into the NBA ==
Round	Pick	Player	NBA club
3	61	Herbert Crook	Indiana Pacers
