= 1988 Metro Conference men's basketball tournament =

- Classification: Division I
- Season: 1987–88
- Teams: 7
- Site: Mid-South Coliseum; Memphis, TN
- Champions: Louisville (6th title)
- Winning coach: Denny Crum (6th title)
- MVP: Herbert Crook (Louisville)

1987–88 Metro Conference men's basketball standings
	Conf.				Overall
Team	W		L	PCT	W		L	PCT
Louisville †	9	–	3	.750	24	–	11	.686
Florida State	7	–	5	.583	19	–	11	.633
South Carolina	6	–	6	.500	19	–	10	.655
Virginia Tech	6	–	6	.500	19	–	10	.655
Memphis State	6	–	6	.500	20	–	12	.625
Southern Miss	5	–	7	.417	19	–	11	.633
Cincinnati	3	–	9	.250	11	–	17	.393
† 1988 Metro Conference tournament winner Rankings from AP Poll

The 1988 Metro Conference men's basketball tournament was held March 11–13 at the Mid-South Coliseum in Memphis, Tennessee.

Louisville defeated Memphis State in the championship game, 81–73, to win their sixth Metro men's basketball tournament.

The Cardinals, still smarting from not having received a bid the previous year one year after being national champions, in turn received a bid to the 1988 NCAA Tournament.

== Format ==
All seven of the conference's members participated. They were seeded based on regular season conference records, with the top team earning a bye into the semifinal round. The other six teams entered into the preliminary first round.

== Bracket ==
First round Friday, March 11
5	Virginia Tech	81
4	South Carolina	93
6	Southern Miss	84
3	Memphis State	97
7	Cincinnati	74
2	Florida State	84

Semifinals; Saturday, March 12
1	Louisville	89
4	South Carolina	57
3	Memphis State	81
2	Florida State	74

Championship; Sunday, March 13
1	Louisville	81
3	Memphis State	73
