= Charlie Tyra =

American basketball player (1935–2006)

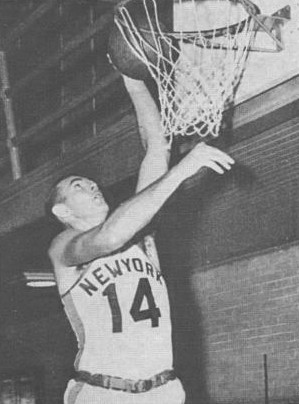

Personal information
- Born: August 16, 1935 Louisville, Kentucky, U.S.
- Died: December 29, 2006 (aged 71) Louisville, Kentucky, U.S.
- Listed height: 6 ft 8 in (2.03 m)
- Listed weight: 230 lb (104 kg)

Career information
- High school: Atherton (Louisville, Kentucky)
- College: Louisville (1953–1957)
- NBA draft: 1957: 1st round, 2nd overall pick
- Drafted by: Detroit Pistons
- Playing career: 1957–1963
- Position: Power forward / center
- Number: 14

Career history
- 1957–1961: New York Knicks
- 1961–1962: Chicago Packers
- 1962–1963: Pittsburgh Rens

Career highlights
- Consensus first-team All-American (1957); No. 8 retired by Louisville Cardinals

Career NBA statistics
- Points: 3,091 (8.9 ppg)
- Rebounds: 2,567 (7.4 rpg)
- Assists: 315 (0.9 apg)
- Stats at NBA.com
- Stats at Basketball Reference

Charles E. Tyra (/ˈtaɪreɪ/ Tie-RAY; August 16, 1935 – December 29, 2006) was an American basketball player who is best known as the first Louisville Cardinal All-American. He played five seasons in the National Basketball Association (NBA) for the New York Knicks and Chicago Packers.

== Basketball career ==
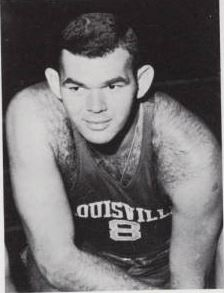
Tyra as a senior at Louisville.

Tyna attended Atherton High School in Louisville, Kentucky and played collegiately for the Louisville Cardinals from 1953 to 1957.

Tyra was a 1957 All-American. He is still the school's leading all-time rebounder and ranks 11th on the NCAA career rebounds list with 1,617. He was the first and one of five to have their basketball jersey number retired by Louisville Cardinals.

Tyra was the No. 2 overall pick of the 1957 NBA draft by the Detroit Pistons. Prior to the April 17, 1957 draft day, on April 3, 1957, the #2 pick (Tyra) was traded by the Pistons with Mel Hutchins to the New York Knicks for Dick Atha, Nathaniel Clifton and Harry Gallatin.

On May 16, 1961, Tyra was traded by the New York Knicks with Bob McNeill to the Chicago Packers for Dave Budd.

Overall, Tyra played five seasons in the National Basketball Association for the New York Knicks (1957–1961) and Chicago Packers (1961–1962). He played one season with the Pittsburgh Rens (1962–1963) of the American Basketball League. Tyra averaged 8.9 points and 7.4 rebounds in 348 NBA games.

== Personal ==
Tyra died, aged 71, at the Franciscan Health Care Center in Louisville, Kentucky on December 29, 2006; he had been diagnosed with congestive heart failure more than two years earlier.

Tyra's son, Vince Tyra, served as athletic director at the University of Louisville from 2018 to 2021. He served as the interim athletic director after the departure of Tom Jurich and was appointed permanently to the position on March 26, 2018, before leaving on December 10, 2021.

== Career statistics ==
Legend
| GP | Games played | GS | Games started | MPG | Minutes per game |
| FG% | Field goal percentage | 3P% | 3-point field goal percentage | FT% | Free throw percentage |
| RPG | Rebounds per game | APG | Assists per game | SPG | Steals per game |
| BPG | Blocks per game | PPG | Points per game | **Bold** | Career high |

=== NBA ===
==== Regular season ====
| Year | Team | GP | MPG | FG% | FT% | RPG | APG | PPG |
|---|---|---|---|---|---|---|---|---|
| 1957–58 | New York | 68 | 17.4 | .357 | .670 | 7.1 | .5 | 7.4 |
| 1958–59 | New York | 69 | 23.0 | .396 | .679 | 7.0 | .5 | 8.8 |
| 1959–60 | New York | 74 | **27.5** | **.426** | **.704** | **8.1** | 1.1 | **12.8** |
| 1960–61 | New York | 59 | 23.8 | .362 | .694 | 6.7 | **1.4** | 8.8 |
| 1961–62 | Chicago | **78** | 20.6 | .361 | .621 | 7.8 | 1.1 | 6.7 |
| Career | | 348 | 22.4 | .387 | .672 | 7.4 | .9 | 8.9 |

==== Playoffs ====
| Year | Team | GP | MPG | FG% | FT% | RPG | APG | PPG |
|---|---|---|---|---|---|---|---|---|
| 1959 | New York | 2 | 27.5 | .429 | .667 | 15.5 | .5 | 15.0 |

== See also ==
- List of NCAA Division I men's basketball players with 30 or more rebounds in a game
- List of NCAA Division I men's basketball career rebounding leaders
