= Phil Bond =

American basketball player (born 1954)

Personal information
- Born: July 27, 1954 (age 72) Paducah, Kentucky, U.S.
- Listed height: 6 ft 2 in (1.88 m)
- Listed weight: 175 lb (79 kg)

Career information
- High school: duPont Manual (Louisville, Kentucky)
- College: Louisville (1973–1977)
- NBA draft: 1977: 3rd round, 62nd overall pick
- Drafted by: Houston Rockets
- Position: Point guard
- Number: 30

Career history
- 1977: Houston Rockets
- Stats at NBA.com
- Stats at Basketball Reference
Medals
Representing United States
Men's basketball
Pan American Games
Gold medal – first place	1975 Mexico City	Team competition

Phillip Damone Bond (born July 27, 1954) is an American former professional basketball player.

Born in Paducah, Kentucky, Bond attended Manual High School in Louisville, where he graduated third in his class of 312 in 1972. He played collegiately for the University of Louisville.

In 1975 he started for Denny Crum's second team to reach the Final Four and was selected Most Valuable Player in the NCAA Midwest Region Tournament. He also played on the United States Pan American team that won a gold medal. He was an All-American in 1976 and broke Jim Price's assist record, which stood for 14 years. He also held U of L's single game assist record for 26 years. In addition, he was selected as an Academic All-American in 1976.

He was selected by the Houston Rockets in the 3rd round (62nd pick overall) of the 1977 NBA draft.

He played for the Rockets (1977–78) in the NBA for seven games.

In 1983, Bond joined the staff of Metro United Way in Louisville, Kentucky. He is currently the chief financial officer of the organization.

In 2013, his son, Jordan Bond, was a walk-on with the University of Louisville basketball team that won the men's NCAA national championship.

== Career statistics ==
Legend
GP	Games played	GS	Games started	MPG	Minutes per game
FG%	Field goal percentage	3P%	3-point field goal percentage	FT%	Free throw percentage
RPG	Rebounds per game	APG	Assists per game	SPG	Steals per game
BPG	Blocks per game	PPG	Points per game	**Bold**	Career high

=== NBA ===
==== Regular season ====
Year	Team	GP	MPG	FG%	FT%	RPG	APG	SPG	BPG	PPG
1977–78	Houston	7	3.0	.333	–	.6	.3	.1	.0	.6
