= Dwayne Morton =

American basketball player (born 1971)

Personal information
- Born: August 10, 1971 (age 55) Louisville, Kentucky, U.S.
- Listed height: 6 ft 7 in (2.01 m)
- Listed weight: 195 lb (88 kg)

Career information
- High school: Central (Louisville, Kentucky)
- College: Louisville (1991–1994)
- NBA draft: 1994: 2nd round, 45th overall pick
- Drafted by: Golden State Warriors
- Playing career: 1994–2012
- Position: Small forward
- Number: 50

Career history
- 1994–1995: Golden State Warriors
- 1996–1997: Newcastle Eagles

Career highlights
- McDonald's All-American (1990); First-team Parade All-American (1990); Fourth-team Parade All-American (1989); Kentucky Mr. Basketball (1990)
- Stats at NBA.com
- Stats at Basketball Reference

Dwayne Lamont Morton (born August 10, 1971) is an American former professional basketball player. Born and raised in Louisville, Kentucky, he played 41 games for the National Basketball Association's Golden State Warriors during the 1994–95 NBA season.

In 2009-10 he played professionally in Bulgaria for Chernomorets Burgas, his 4th team while in the country. Prior to his campaign in Bulgaria he played in Israel, England, France and the Dominican Republic.
