= Reece Gaines =

American basketball player (born 1981)

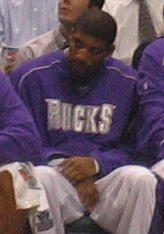
- Gaines in 2005

Personal information
- Born: January 7, 1981 (age 45) Madison, Wisconsin, U.S.
- Listed height: 6 ft 6 in (1.98 m)
- Listed weight: 205 lb (93 kg)

Career information
- High school: Madison West (Madison, Wisconsin)
- College: Louisville (1999–2003)
- NBA draft: 2003: 1st round, 15th overall pick
- Drafted by: Orlando Magic
- Playing career: 2003–2012
- Position: Shooting guard / point guard
- Number: 22, 4, 34
- Coaching career: 2012–present

Career history

Playing
- 2003–2004: Orlando Magic
- 2004–2005: Houston Rockets
- 2005–2006: Milwaukee Bucks
- 2006–2007: Angelico Biella
- 2007: Armani Jeans Milano
- 2007–2008: Benetton Treviso
- 2008–2009: Angelico Biella
- 2009–2010: Bakersfield Jam
- 2010: Peristeri
- 2010: Texas Legends
- 2010–2011: JA Vichy
- 2012: Fürstenfeld Panthers
- 2012: Guaros de Lara

Career highlights
- As Player: Third-team All-American – AP, NABC, SN (2003); 2× First-team All-Conference USA (2002, 2003)
- Stats at NBA.com
- Stats at Basketball Reference

Clifton Reece Gaines (born January 7, 1981) is an American former professional basketball player and former assistant coach at Austin Spurs.

== High school and college career ==
Gaines, a 6-foot-6-inch (1.98 m), 205-pound (93 kg) shooting guard, played high school basketball at Madison West in his hometown of Madison, Wisconsin. He then played four years at the University of Louisville, earning AP All-America 3rd-team honors his senior season while leading the Cardinals to a 25–7 win–loss record. He is considered one of the best all-time shooting guards for the Louisville Cardinal basketball program. He ranks among the top-five Louisville leaders in made three-point field goals (225), free throws (456) and assists (475). Dwyane Wade of the Miami Heat once called Reece Gaines "the best college basketball player he ever faced".

== NBA career ==
Gaines was drafted by the Orlando Magic in the first round (15th overall) of the 2003 NBA draft and signed with the club on July 18, 2003. He spent one season on the bench in Orlando (1.8 points, 1.0 rebounds and 1.1 assists per game in 38 games) before being traded to the Houston Rockets (along with Tracy McGrady, Juwan Howard and Tyronn Lue) in exchange for Steve Francis, Cuttino Mobley and Kelvin Cato.

Gaines played ten games with the Rockets (2.6 points, 1.1 rebounds and 0.3 assists per game), spending the majority of his time on the injured list. He was traded again on February 24, 2005 (with two future second-round picks) to the Milwaukee Bucks for Mike James and Zendon Hamilton. Gaines saw even less playing time with the Bucks during the second half of the 2004–05 season, playing a total of 79 minutes (1.4 points, 0.3 rebounds and 0.4 assists per game) in 11 games. Gaines's playing time decreased even more with the Bucks in the 2005–06 season, appearing in 12 games, and playing 52 total minutes (1.1 points, no rebounds and 0.3 assists per game).

Gaines's final NBA game was played on February 12, 2006, in a 79–94 loss to the New Jersey Nets in which he recorded 2 assists and a steal.

== NBA career statistics ==
Legend
GP	Games played	GS	Games started	MPG	Minutes per game
FG%	Field goal percentage	3P%	3-point field goal percentage	FT%	Free throw percentage
RPG	Rebounds per game	APG	Assists per game	SPG	Steals per game
BPG	Blocks per game	PPG	Points per game	**Bold**	Career high

=== Regular season ===
Year	Team	GP	GS	MPG	FG%	3P%	FT%	RPG	APG	SPG	BPG	PPG
2003–04	Orlando	**38**	**1**	9.6	.291	.300	.640	1.0	**1.1**	**0.3**	**0.1**	1.8
2004–05	Houston	10	0	**10.8**	.370	.250	**.750**	**1.1**	0.3	**0.3**	0.0	**2.6**
2004–05	Milwaukee	11	0	7.2	.304	**.500**	.000	0.3	0.4	0.2	**0.1**	1.4
2005–06	Milwaukee	12	0	4.5	**.500**	.000	.250	0.0	0.3	0.1	0.0	1.1
Career		71	1	8.5	.324	.269	.606	0.7	0.7	0.2	0.0	1.7

== International career ==
In 2006, he moved to Italy where he played for Angelico Biella, Armani Jeans Milano and Benetton Treviso. In 2009, he joined the Bakersfield Jam, with whom he averaged 14.3 points and 4.0 assists per game. In December 2010 he signed with JA Vichy in France. In January 2012 Gaines signed a 30-day contract with the Fürstenfeld Panthers in Austria. On February 2, 2012, the Panthers announced that the contract with Gaines would not be extended.

== Coaching career ==
In 2012, Gaines was hired as an assistant coach at Bellarmine University, where he coached for three seasons. While at Bellarmine, he helped the Knights to three straight NCAA Division II tournament appearances, including a Sweet 16 and a Final Four trip.

In 2015, Gaines became an assistant coach at Eastern Kentucky University. In 2018, Gaines was named acting coach after head coach Dan McHale's contract was terminated.

On November 5, 2019, the Austin Spurs announced that they had named Gaines as assistant coach.
