= Darrell Griffith =

American basketball player (born 1958)

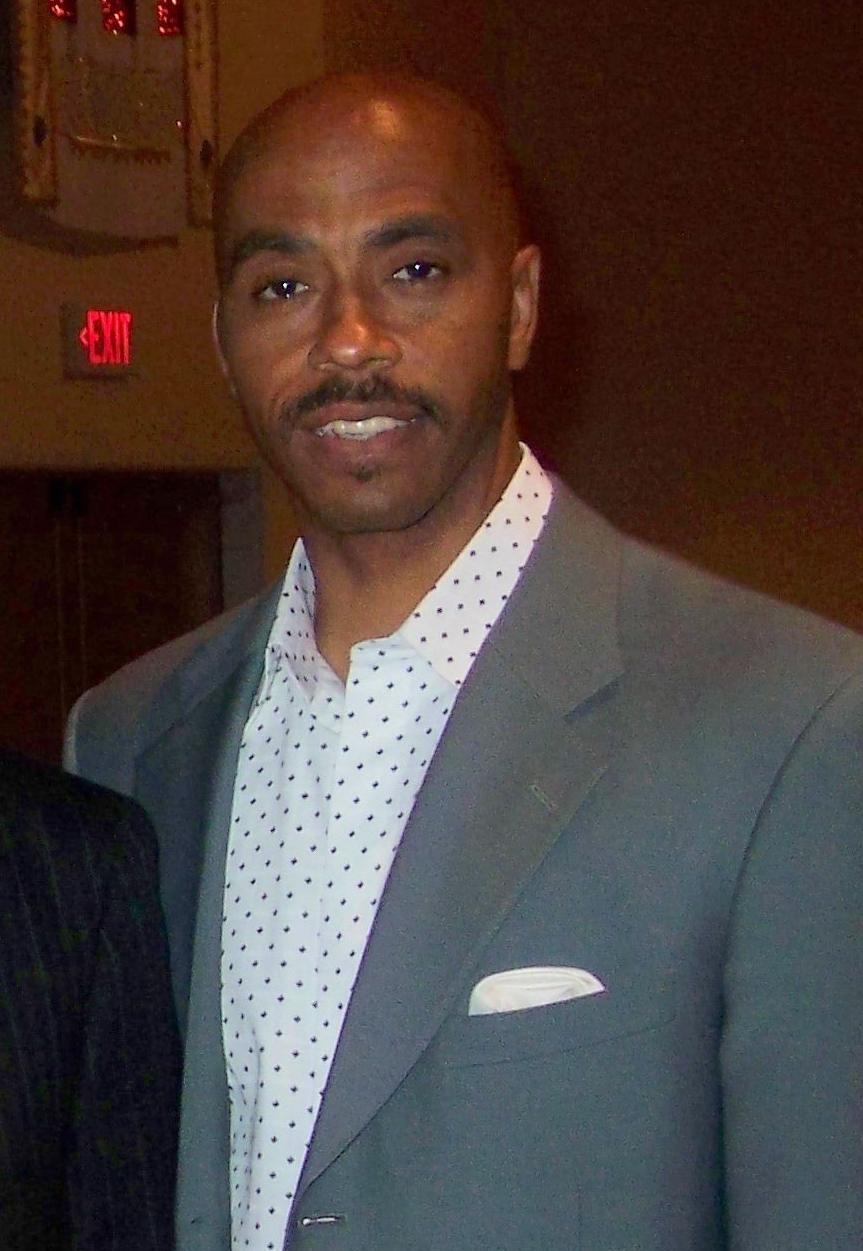
- Griffith in 2007

Personal information
- Born: June 16, 1958 (age 68) Louisville, Kentucky, U.S.
- Listed height: 6 ft 4 in (1.93 m)
- Listed weight: 190 lb (86 kg)

Career information
- High school: Louisville Male (Louisville, Kentucky)
- College: Louisville (1976–1980)
- NBA draft: 1980: 1st round, 2nd overall pick
- Drafted by: Utah Jazz
- Playing career: 1980–1991
- Position: Shooting guard
- Number: 35

Career history
- 1980–1991: Utah Jazz

Career highlights
- NBA Rookie of the Year (1981); NBA All-Rookie First Team (1981); No. 35 retired by Utah Jazz; NCAA champion (1980); NCAA Final Four Most Outstanding Player (1980); John R. Wooden Player of the Year Award (1980); Sporting News Player of the Year (1980); Consensus first-team All-American (1980); Second-team All-American – UPI (1979); Third-team All-American – NABC (1979); Metro Conference Player of the Year (1980); 3× First-team All-Metro Conference (1978–1980); No. 35 retired by Louisville Cardinals; Mr. Basketball USA (1976); First-team Parade All-American (1976); Kentucky Mr. Basketball (1976)

Career NBA statistics
- Points: 12,391 (16.2 ppg)
- Rebounds: 2,519 (3.3 rpg)
- Assists: 1,627 (2.1 apg)
- Stats at NBA.com
- Stats at Basketball Reference
- Collegiate Basketball Hall of Fame

Darrell Steven Griffith (born June 16, 1958), also known by his nickname Dr. Dunkenstein, is an American former professional basketball player who spent his entire career with the Utah Jazz of the National Basketball Association (NBA) from 1980 to 1991. He played collegiately at the University of Louisville.

== Early life and college ==
Griffith starred at Louisville Male High School and was heavily recruited by colleges all across the country. Male defeated Lexington Henry Clay 74–59 in the 1975 Kentucky State Championship game. In fact, Griffith reportedly turned down an offer to forego college and sign with the ABA's Kentucky Colonels. He decided to attend his hometown school, the University of Louisville, much to the delight of local fans.

He did not disappoint, delivering the school's first-ever NCAA men's basketball championship in 1980. He scored 23 points in the Cardinals' 59–54 victory over UCLA in the championship game. Due to his strong performance, he was named Most Outstanding Player of the Final Four. Griffith totaled 825 points in his senior season, setting a school record. For his efforts, he was named First Team All-American by the Associated Press and was given the Wooden Award as the best college basketball player in the nation. He left college as Louisville's all-time leading scorer with 2,333 points in his career. His jersey number, 35, was retired during ceremonies after the 1980 season.

In November 2014, Griffith was inducted into the College Basketball Hall of Fame.

== Professional career ==
Utah selected Griffith with the second overall pick in the 1980 NBA draft. The Jazz had recently moved to Salt Lake City from New Orleans, and the team needed a star to replace legendary shooting guard Pete Maravich. Griffith accepted the challenge, averaging 20.6 points per game in his first season and earning the NBA's Rookie of the Year award.

For the next four seasons, Griffith teamed with small forward Adrian Dantley to form one of the highest-scoring duos in the league. With defensive support from center Mark Eaton and point guard Rickey Green, the Jazz improved dramatically, winning the Midwest Division title in 1983–84 and qualifying for the NBA playoffs for the first time ever. Individually, Griffith transformed his offensive game, adding long-distance shooting skills to his aerial acrobatics. He led the league in three-point shooting (36.1 percent) and set an NBA record for most three-pointers made in a single season (91). His new abilities earned him a new nickname: Utah's play-by-play announcer Hot Rod Hundley began calling him "The Golden Griff".

The following season (1984–85) was the best of Griffith's career. He averaged a career-high 22.6 points per game, and broke his own league record by sinking 92 three-point shots. During the year, he passed Joey Hassett as the all-time NBA leader for most career three-pointers. He also continued his high-flying ways, representing the Jazz in the 1984 and 1985 NBA Slam Dunk Contests.

However, things changed dramatically for Griffith and the Jazz team in the mid-1980s. John Stockton and Karl Malone, drafted in the 1984 and 1985 NBA Drafts, emerged as Utah's next top offensive weapons; Dantley, who began to clash regularly with head coach Frank Layden, was traded away, thus breaking up the high-scoring Dantley-Griffith tandem; and Griffith began to suffer from a string of injuries. "Dr. Dunkenstein was paying his toll", he once said in an interview. He missed the entire 1985–86 season due to a stress fracture in his foot, and would lose his starting position when he returned. Griffith would need an operation on his left knee in March 1988, causing him to miss the remainder of that season. He managed to reclaim his starting spot for most of the 1988–89 season, but lost it permanently the following year. His playing time gradually decreased until his retirement in 1991. He scored 12,391 total points over the course of his 10-year professional career – all with the Jazz. The franchise recognized his contributions by retiring his jersey number 35 on December 4, 1993.

== Post-basketball career ==
In the 2010s and 20s, Griffith returned to his alma mater as a special assistant to President James R. Ramsey and later as a university ambassador under President Neeli Bendapudi.

== NBA career statistics ==
Legend
| GP | Games played | GS | Games started | MPG | Minutes per game |
| FG% | Field goal percentage | 3P% | 3-point field goal percentage | FT% | Free throw percentage |
| RPG | Rebounds per game | APG | Assists per game | SPG | Steals per game |
| BPG | Blocks per game | PPG | Points per game | **Bold** | Career high |
| * | Led the league |

=== Regular season ===
| Year | Team | GP | GS | MPG | FG% | 3P% | FT% | RPG | APG | SPG | BPG | PPG |
|---|---|---|---|---|---|---|---|---|---|---|---|---|
| 1980–81 | Utah | 81 | — | 35.4 | .464 | .192 | .716 | 3.6 | 2.4 | 1.3 | **.5** | 20.6 |
| 1981–82 | Utah | 80 | 79 | 32.5 | .482 | .288 | .697 | 3.8 | 2.3 | 1.2 | .4 | 19.8 |
| 1982–83 | Utah | 77 | 76 | 36.2 | .484 | .288 | .679 | 3.9 | **3.5** | **1.8** | .4 | 22.2 |
| 1983–84 | Utah | **82** | **82** | 32.3 | **.490** | .361* | .696 | 4.1 | **3.5** | 1.4 | .3 | 20.0 |
| 1984–85 | Utah | 78 | 78 | **35.6** | .457 | .358 | .725 | **4.4** | 3.1 | 1.7 | .4 | **22.6** |
| 1986–87 | Utah | 76 | 10 | 24.3 | .446 | .335 | .703 | 3.0 | 1.7 | 1.3 | .4 | 15.0 |
| 1987–88 | Utah | 52 | 11 | 20.2 | .429 | .275 | .641 | 2.4 | 1.8 | 1.0 | .1 | 11.3 |
| 1988–89 | Utah | **82** | 73 | 29.0 | .446 | .311 | **.780** | 4.0 | 1.6 | 1.0 | .3 | 13.8 |
| 1989–90 | Utah | **82** | 1 | 17.6 | .464 | **.372** | .654 | 2.0 | .8 | .8 | .2 | 8.9 |
| 1990–91 | Utah | 75 | 2 | 13.4 | .391 | .348 | .756 | 1.2 | .5 | .6 | .1 | 5.7 |
| Career | | 765 | 412 | 28.0 | .463 | .332 | .707 | 3.3 | 2.1 | 1.2 | .3 | 16.2 |

=== Playoffs ===
| Year | Team | GP | GS | MPG | FG% | 3P% | FT% | RPG | APG | SPG | BPG | PPG |
|---|---|---|---|---|---|---|---|---|---|---|---|---|
| 1984 | Utah | **11** | — | **37.9** | .443 | .356 | .688 | **5.9** | **3.7** | **1.7** | .2 | **19.2** |
| 1985 | Utah | 10 | 10 | 34.0 | .456 | .361 | .720 | 2.9 | 2.5 | 1.2 | **.5** | 17.5 |
| 1987 | Utah | 5 | 0 | 20.8 | .369 | .400 | .737 | 2.4 | 1.6 | 1.2 | .4 | 13.6 |
| 1989 | Utah | 3 | 0 | 23.7 | .408 | .316 | — | 4.0 | .0 | 1.3 | .3 | 15.3 |
| 1990 | Utah | 5 | 0 | 19.4 | .452 | **.556** | **.800** | 4.2 | .6 | 1.2 | .2 | 9.4 |
| 1991 | Utah | 3 | 0 | 3.0 | **.714** | — | — | .7 | .0 | .0 | .0 | 3.3 |
| Career | | 37 | 10 | 28.1 | .438 | .371 | .711 | 3.8 | 2.1 | 1.3 | .3 | 15.1 |

== See also ==
- List of University of Louisville people
- List of people from the Louisville metropolitan area
- List of NBA players who have spent their entire career with one franchise
