= Herbert Crook =

American basketball player (born 1965)

Personal information
- Born: July 26, 1965 (age 61) Louisville, Kentucky, U.S.
- Listed height: 6 ft 7 in (2.01 m)
- Listed weight: 210 lb (95 kg)

Career information
- High school: Eastern (Louisville, Kentucky)
- College: Louisville (1984–1988)
- NBA draft: 1988: 3rd round, 61st overall pick
- Drafted by: Indiana Pacers
- Playing career: 1988–1999
- Position: Small forward

Career history
- 1988: Quad City Thunder
- 1988–1989: La Crosse Catbirds
- 1989: Grand Rapids Hoops
- 1990: Leuven
- 1990: Tulsa Fast Breakers
- 1991–1992: HNMKY
- 1994–1995: HoNsU
- 1996: HNMKY
- 1996: HoNsU
- 1998-1999: Atomics Brussels

Career highlights
- Korisliiga champion (1992); Korisliiga scoring leader (1992); Korisliiga rebounding leader (1992); NCAA champion (1986); Metro Conference Player of the Year (1987); First-team All-Metro Conference (1987); Second-team All-Metro Conference (1988)
- Stats at Basketball Reference

Herbert Crook (born July 26, 1965) is an American former basketball player. He was a standout at the University of Louisville. He was a starter on the Cardinals' 1986 national championship team and was Metro Conference player of the year as a junior.

== College career ==
Crook, a 6'7" forward from Louisville, Kentucky and attended Westport High School during his freshman year and then to Eastern High School. He played at Louisville for Hall of Fame coach Denny Crum. Crook was a three-year starter, and played for Louisville's national championship team in 1986, averaging 11.8 points and 6.5 assists that year. As a junior, Crook was named Metro Conference player of the year after 16.1 points, 6.5 rebounds and 3.4 assists per game. Crook finished his career in the University of Louisville top ten in a number of career statistical categories, including points, rebounds, minutes played, games played, field goals, free throws and free throw attempts.

== Professional career ==
Following the completion of his college career, Crook was drafted by the Indiana Pacers in the third round (61st pick) of the 1988 NBA draft. However, Crook never played in the NBA. Crook did play two seasons in the Continental Basketball Association. He averaged 11.7 points and 6.4 rebounds over 56 games with four different teams. He played four seasons in the Finnish Korisliiga, averaging 27.0 points and 10.6 rebounds in 112 games. He won the Korisliiga championship in 1992 and led the league in scoring and rebounds the same year.
