= Metro Conference (1975–1995) =

U.S. college athletic conference

- Association: NCAA
- Founded: 1975
- Folded: 1995
- Division: Division I
- No. of teams: 7 (final), 13 (total)

Locations
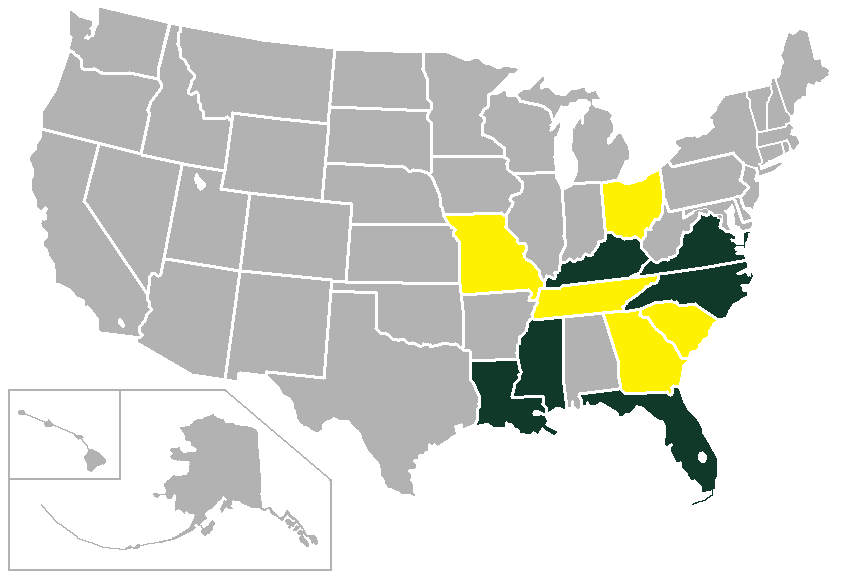

The Metropolitan Collegiate Athletic Conference, popularly known as the Metro Conference, was an NCAA Division I athletics conference, so named because its six charter members were all in major urban metropolitan areas, though most of its later members did not follow that pattern. The conference was centered in the Upper South with some strength in the Deep South. The conference never sponsored football, although most of its members throughout its history had Division I-A football programs (from 1983 to 1991, all Metro schools had independent football programs). In 1995, it merged with the Great Midwest Conference to form Conference USA. The merger was driven mainly by football, as several Metro Conference members had been successfully lured to larger conferences that sponsored the sport.

The conference was popularly known as the "Metro 6" during its first season, then as the "Metro 7" during the rest of the 1970s and early 1980s. For most of its existence, it was considered a "major" conference.

== History ==
The Metro Conference was founded in 1975 with institutions that were located in urban metropolitan areas. The charter members were the University of Cincinnati, Georgia Institute of Technology, the University of Louisville, Memphis State University (now the University of Memphis), Saint Louis University and Tulane University. Florida State University joined in 1976, while the University of South Carolina turned down an invitation.

In 1978, Georgia Tech left the Metro for the Atlantic Coast Conference, effective on July 1, 1979; and Virginia Tech took its spot. In 1982, Saint Louis left to join the Midwestern Collegiate Conference, now known as the Horizon League; while the University of Southern Mississippi took its spot in that same year. The University of South Carolina later joined in 1983. In 1985, West Virginia University was in talks to replace Tulane, which had suspended its men’s basketball program due to a point shaving scandal and thus expelled from the conference. Ultimately, West Virginia officials decided to remain in the Atlantic 10 Conference. Tulane was readmitted to the Metro on July 1, 1989 after it announced it was reinstating men's basketball for the 1989-90 season.

In 1991, Florida State joined the ACC, and then South Carolina joined the Southeastern Conference. However, South Carolina re-joined the Metro for 1993 and 1994 men's soccer seasons in that sport only, because the SEC did not offer the sport for men (four schools were required to sponsor a sport; the SEC had just three, now two). Charter members Cincinnati and Memphis State also left the Metro in 1991 to become charter members of the Great Midwest. To replace them, three of the stronger non-football schools from the Sun Belt Conference (the University of North Carolina at Charlotte, the University of South Florida and Virginia Commonwealth University) shifted to the Metro.

In 1993, the Metro and Great Midwest conferences began reunification talks that led to the creation of C-USA. However, the Virginia schools filed a lawsuit in order to prevent the merger from happening, which ultimately failed. VCU joined the Colonial Athletic Association, now known as the Coastal Athletic Association. Virginia Tech (which was banking on an invitation to join the Big East Conference) was left out of Conference USA, and joined the Atlantic 10 Conference (it later joined the Big East in 2000 and has been in the Atlantic Coast Conference since 2004). It was joined by Great Midwest member Dayton, which was intrigued by the prospect of playing against regional rival Xavier.

Initially, South Carolina was not permitted to participate in Conference USA for men's soccer, although it was admitted ten years later, also bringing along Kentucky, the only other men's soccer school in the SEC (coincidentally, Tulane was a longtime SEC member from 1932 until 1966). Until 2021–22 season, South Carolina men's soccer was the last link of the Metro Conference with the reunified Conference USA, although West Virginia, which rejected Metro membership in 1985, was supposed to join Conference USA for men's soccer in 2022 but with the 2020s NCAA conference realignment, Conference USA lost almost all of its men's soccer members and was consequently forced to drop the sport. South Carolina, Kentucky, and West Virginia joined the Sun Belt Conference in men's soccer.

== Proposed super conference ==
The Metro Conference also had studies into a new "Super conference" in 1990. The study was conducted by Raycom Sports. The conference would have included members of the Metro, Atlantic 10, and Big East conferences, but it was not clear if the conference would become a football-sponsoring conference as many of its members did in fact sponsor football but were either independents or belonged to other conferences. The original study plan also included Penn State, which was invited to join the Big Ten on December 15, 1989.

Map of the proposed "Metro Super Conference"

| North Division | South Division |
|---|---|
| Boston College | East Carolina |
| Cincinnati | Florida State |
| Pittsburgh | Louisville |
| Rutgers | Memphis State |
| Syracuse | Miami |
| Temple | South Carolina |
| Virginia Tech | Southern Mississippi |
| West Virginia | Tulane |

== Member schools ==
=== Charter members ===
| Institution | Location | Founded | Affiliation | Enrollment | Nickname | Joined (Note: Represents the calendar year when fall sports competition begins.) | Left (Note: Represents the calendar year when spring sports competition ends.) | Subsequent conference(s) | Current conference |
|---|---|---|---|---|---|---|---|---|---|
| University of Cincinnati (Note: School was charter member of Conference USA, but has since left for another conference. South Florida, Memphis and Tulane are now members of The American. Cincinnati is now a member of the Big 12.) | Cincinnati, Ohio | 1819 | Public | 41,357 | Bearcats | 1975 | 1991 | various (Note: Cincinnati had joined the following subsequent conferences: the Great Midwest Conference (CUSA) from 1991–92 to 1994–95; Conference USA (CUSA) from 1995–96 to 2004–05; the original Big East Conference from 2005–06 to 2012–13; and the American Athletic Conference (AAC or The American) from 2013–14 to 2022–23.) | Big 12 (2023–present) |
| Georgia Institute of Technology (Georgia Tech) | Atlanta, Georgia | 1885 | Public | 21,557 | Yellow Jackets | 1975 | 1978 | Atlantic Coast (ACC) (1978–present) | |
| University of Louisville | Louisville, Kentucky | 1798 | Public | 22,249 | Cardinals | 1975 | 2005 | various (Note: Louisville had joined the following subsequent conferences: Conference USA (CUSA) from 1995–96 to 2004–05; the original Big East Conference from 2005–06 to 2012–13; and the American Athletic Conference (AAC or American) during the 2013–14 school year.) | Atlantic Coast (ACC) (2014–present) |
| Memphis State University (Note: Formerly known as Memphis State University until 1994.) | Memphis, Tennessee | 1912 | Public | 22,365 | Tigers | 1975 | 1991 | Great Midwest (1991–95); Conf. USA (CUSA) (1995–2013) | American (2013–present) |
| Saint Louis University | St. Louis, Missouri | 1818 | Catholic (Jesuit) | 13,785 | Billikens | 1975 | 1982 | various (Note: Saint Louis had joined the following subsequent conferences: the Midwestern City Conference (now the Horizon League) from 1982–83 to 1990–91; the Great Midwest Conference from 1991–92 to 1994–95; and Conference USA (CUSA) from 1995–96 to 2004–05.) | Atlantic 10 (A10) (2005–present) |
| Tulane University (Note: From 1985 through 1989, Tulane dropped its men's basketball program after a point shaving scandal and was expelled from the conference. It was readmitted in 1989 when it reinstated men's basketball.) | New Orleans, Louisiana | 1834 | Nonsectarian | 13,359 | Green Wave | 1975, 1989 | 1985, 2013 | Conf. USA (CUSA) (1995–2014) | American (2014–present) |

=== Later members ===
| Institution | Location | Founded | Affiliation | Enrollment | Nickname | Joined (Note: Represents the calendar year when fall sports competition begins.) | Left (Note: Represents the calendar year when spring sports competition ends.) | Subsequent conference(s) | Current conference |
|---|---|---|---|---|---|---|---|---|---|
| Florida State University | Tallahassee, Florida | 1851 | Public | 41,710 | Seminoles | 1976 | 1991 | Atlantic Coast (ACC) (1991–present) | |
| Virginia Polytechnic Institute and State University (Virginia Tech) | Blacksburg, Virginia | 1872 | Public | 31,087 | Hokies | 1978 | 1995 | Atlantic 10 (A10) (1995–2000) original Big East (2000–04) | Atlantic Coast (ACC) (2004–present) |
| University of Southern Mississippi (Southern Miss) | Hattiesburg, Mississippi | 1910 | Public | 17,968 | Golden Eagles | 1982 | 2022 | Conf. USA (CUSA) (1995–2022) | Sun Belt (SBC) (2022–present) |
| University of South Carolina (Note: After leaving the Metro Conference in 1991, South Carolina played two seasons as an independent in men's soccer, as the Southeastern Conference does not sponsor men's soccer. They rejoined the Metro for the sport only in 1993, but were not invited as part of reunification. When the program rejoined CUSA in 2005, Kentucky, the other remaining SEC school with men's soccer, left the Mid-American Conference to follow its SEC brethren.) | Columbia, South Carolina | 1801 | Public | 38,000 | Gamecocks | 1983 | 1991 | Southeastern (SEC) (1991–present) | |
| University of North Carolina at Charlotte (Note: Charlotte was a charter member of Conference USA and left in 2005, to join Saint Louis in the Atlantic 10 Conference. After announcing football would begin play in 2013, Charlotte rejoined CUSA in all sports except football, which underwent a two-year transition period. The school began football play in 2015, but was only conditionally eligible for postseason play that year. Charlotte has since left CUSA again to join the American in 2023.) (Note: Non-football school at the time but has since added football. First year of play was 2003 for South Florida and 2015 for Charlotte.) (UNC Charlotte, Charlotte) | Charlotte, North Carolina | 1946 | Public | 25,277 | 49ers | 1991 | 2005 | Conf. USA (CUSA) (1995–2005, 2013–23); Atlantic 10 (A10) (2005–13) | American (2023–present) |
| University of South Florida (USF) | Tampa, Florida | 1956 | Public | 47,122 | Bulls | 1991 | 2005 | Conf. USA (CUSA) (1995–2005) original Big East (2005–13) | American (2013–present) |
| Virginia Commonwealth University (VCU) | Richmond, Virginia | 1818 | Public | 31,899 | Rams | 1991 | 1995 | Colonial (CAA) (1995–2012) | Atlantic 10 (A10) (2012–present) |

=== Membership timeline ===
Full members (non-football) Associate members (football-only) Associate members (other) Other conference 1 Other conference 2

Notes:

1. Because the Southeastern Conference does not sponsor men's soccer, South Carolina was an independent from the 1991 to 1992 fall season, then rejoined the Metro for the 1993 and 1994 fall seasons.

=== Championships ===
- Metro Conference men's basketball tournament
- Metro Conference baseball tournament
