= Juwan Howard =

American basketball player and coach (born 1973)

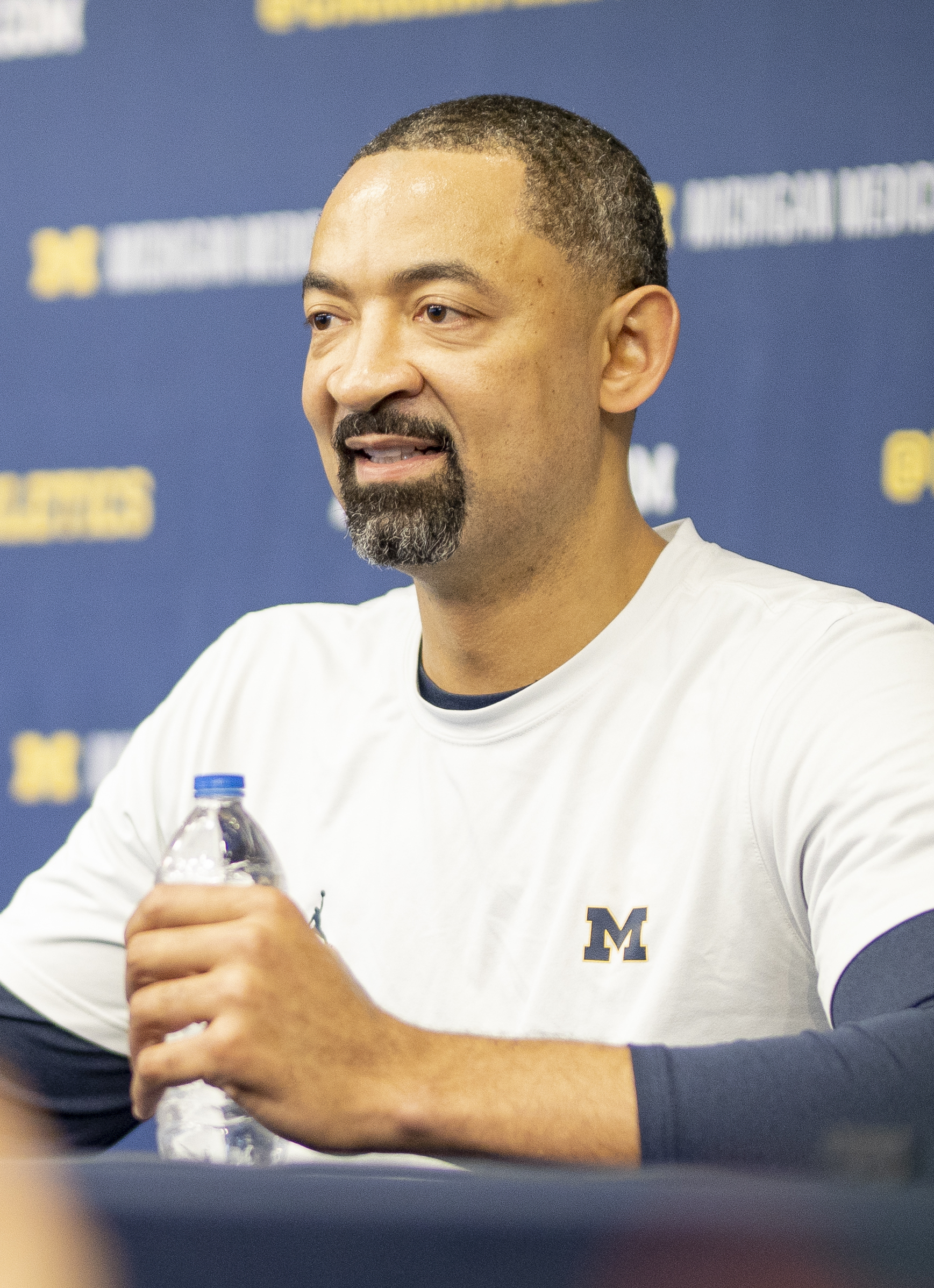
- Howard with the Michigan Wolverines in 2020

Brooklyn Nets
- Title: Assistant coach
- League: NBA

Personal information
- Born: February 7, 1973 (age 53) Chicago, Illinois, U.S.
- Listed height: 6 ft 9 in (2.06 m)
- Listed weight: 250 lb (113 kg)

Career information
- High school: Chicago Vocational
- College: Michigan (1991–1994)
- NBA draft: 1994: 1st round, 5th overall pick
- Drafted by: Washington Bullets
- Playing career: 1994–2013
- Position: Power forward / small forward
- Number: 5, 7, 55, 6
- Coaching career: 2013–present

Career history

Playing
- 1994–2001: Washington Bullets / Wizards
- 2001–2002: Dallas Mavericks
- 2002–2003: Denver Nuggets
- 2003–2004: Orlando Magic
- 2004–2007: Houston Rockets
- 2007–2008: Dallas Mavericks
- 2008: Denver Nuggets
- 2008–2009: Charlotte Bobcats
- 2009–2010: Portland Trail Blazers
- 2010–2013: Miami Heat

Coaching
- 2013–2019: Miami Heat (assistant)
- 2019–2024: Michigan
- 2024–present: Brooklyn Nets (assistant)

Career highlights
- As player: 2× NBA champion (2012, 2013); NBA All-Star (1996); All-NBA Third Team (1996); NBA All-Rookie Second Team (1995); Second-team All-American – NABC (1994); Third-team All-American – AP (1994); First-team Parade All-American (1991); McDonald's All-American (1991); As coach: AP Coach of the Year (2021); Sporting News Coach of the Year (2021); Henry Iba Award (2021); Big Ten Coach of the Year (2021); Big Ten regular season champion (2021)

Career statistics
- Points: 16,159 (13.4 ppg)
- Rebounds: 7,428 (6.1 rpg)
- Assists: 2,663 (2.2 apg)
- Stats at NBA.com
- Stats at Basketball Reference

Juwan Antonio Howard (/dʒuːˈwɑːn/ joo-WAWN) (born February 7, 1973) is an American professional basketball coach and former player, currently an assistant coach for the Brooklyn Nets of the National Basketball Association (NBA). He was previously the head coach at the University of Michigan from 2019 until 2024. Howard played college basketball for the Michigan Wolverines as a member of the Fab Five, and was selected with the fifth overall pick in the 1994 NBA draft by the Washington Bullets. Howard had a 19-year NBA career with eight different teams, winning two NBA championships with the Miami Heat, as well as earned All-Star and All-NBA honors with the Bullets in 1996.

Howard was born and raised in Chicago, Illinois, where he was a high school All-American center and an honors student at Chicago Vocational Career Academy. He gained national prominence after signing with the Michigan Wolverines as part of the Fab Five recruiting class of 1991 (including future NBA stars Jalen Rose and Chris Webber), and reached the finals of the NCAA tournament in both 1992 and 1993. He was an NCAA All-American in 1994.

Howard began his NBA career with the Washington Bullets after being selected in the first round in 1994, and played for the first seven seasons in Washington. His longest stints after were three seasons each with the Houston Rockets (2004–2007) and the Miami Heat for his final three seasons (2010–2013). After retiring, he remained with the Heat organization as an assistant coach for the next six seasons before accepting the head coaching position at Michigan. Howard earned numerous awards for his performance as head coach of the 2020–21 Wolverines, including Big Ten and National Coach of the Year, before being fired in 2024. He is the father of Jett Howard, whom he coached at Michigan.

== Early life ==
Howard was born on February 7, 1973. His paternal grandmother, Jannie Mae Howard, was the daughter of sharecroppers from Belzoni, Mississippi. She had four daughters by 19 years old, including Howard's mother Helena. Helena was an employee at a Chicago restaurant when she became pregnant with Juwan. Howard's father, Leroy Watson, had just returned from the Army to a phone company job in Chicago. The two married quickly once they realized Helena was pregnant. For Howard's first week of life, his high school junior mother kept him in a drawer at Jannie Mae's house. Helena, who was 17 years old, did not want to be restricted or burdened raising her child, so Jannie Mae adopted him. His biological father, Leroy Watson Jr., wanted to name him Leroy Watson, III, but his grandmother rejected the suggestion, insisting on Juwan Antonio Howard. Although his mother visited on occasion as he was growing up, his grandmother raised him, along with two cousins. Howard has no siblings and is not close to his biological parents; his grandmother was the primary influence in his life. He moved with her to several low-income Chicago South Side projects; she kept him out of trouble and away from gangs as he was growing up. One of their residences was a three-bedroom apartment on 69th Street on the South Side of Chicago. As he blossomed under his grandmother's influence and discipline, he became her "pride and joy".

== High school ==
Howard went to Chicago Vocational Career Academy, where he went on to play three seasons of varsity basketball. Vocational had an unheated gym and no locker rooms, which required that the team dress for games in a history classroom. Nonetheless, Howard went on to be named a 1991 All-American basketball player by Parade magazine and won McDonald's All American honors. He was also chosen for the National Honor Society and served as Vocational's homecoming king. During recruiting visits by college coaches such as Illinois' Lou Henson, DePaul's Joey Meyer and Michigan's Steve Fisher, Jannie Mae Howard did most of the questioning.

=== Sophomore year ===
At the start of his sophomore year in 1988, Howard was 15 years old and already expected to be a coveted blue chip recruit in 1991. He was regarded as one of the best sophomore basketball players in the Chicago metropolitan area. He scored 26 points in a Chicago Public High School League quarterfinal loss against a Deon Thomas-led Simeon Career Academy team. Vocational ended the year with a 23–7 record. Howard was a second-team selection and the only sophomore named to the league coaches' 20-man 1988–89 All-Public League team.

The summer after his sophomore year, the 6-foot-8-inch (2.03 m) center attended the Nike Academic Betterment and Career Development (ABCD) camp, which was held annually in Princeton, New Jersey, during the late 1980s. There he was matched against the 7-foot-4-inch (2.24 m) Shawn Bradley. At this camp, even though the much-taller Bradley blocked his shots several times, Howard established himself as one of the best junior-year big men in the country. He was involved in controversy for receiving a second pair of sneakers at the camp because he was suspected of stealing them. Howard denied theft, but he was sent home on the last day of the six-day camp.

Howard also participated in the Bill Cronauer camp in Rensselaer, Indiana, which more than 100 college coaches attended. According to the Chicago Sun-Times, he was ranked as one of the top 10 underclassmen in the country during the camp. Howard attended other camps that summer; his goal was to overcome Thomas, who was the reigning Chicago Tribune basketball player of the year, as the best big man in the state. By the time he ended his college career in 1994, Howard was drafted a full round ahead of Thomas.

=== Junior year ===
As Howard entered his junior year, some sources listed him as the best junior basketball player in Illinois, while others ranked Tom Kleinschmidt ahead of him. Taylor Bell of the Chicago Sun-Times noted that Howard was leaning toward playing either for DePaul or for Illinois. Howard was interested in Illinois because Thomas, whom Howard admired, had become a member of the 1989–90 Fighting Illini team. By the end of his junior year, league coaches named him to the first-team All-Chicago Public School League. He was selected to the Chicago Sun-Times All-Area team as well as the Class-AA All-State team and established himself as the top Chicago-area junior ahead of Kleinschmidt. Howard had a sub-par performance against King High School in the Chicago Public School League semifinals, but the Chicago Tribune named him to its All-State second team. Vocational finished the year 24–7.

Howard was also an honors student. After his junior year, he was one of 10 Illinois players invited back to the Nike All-American Camp at Princeton. Others invited included Kleinschmidt, Donnie Boyce, William Gates, Billy Taylor, Rashard Griffith and Howard Nathan. Although Howard was considered one of the top prospects in the city of Chicago at that time, the player perceived as the best Chicago-area prospect was Glenn Robinson of Gary, Indiana. By this time, Howard had eliminated DePaul from consideration since Deryl Cunningham, another Chicago-area all-star who might have otherwise convinced Howard to stay in Chicago, had transferred to Kansas State. He was considering Michigan, Michigan State, Kentucky, Arizona, Dayton, Marquette and Illinois. Howard was evaluated as the best senior basketball player at the camp; the group of players in attendance included Chris Webber, Cherokee Parks, Robinson and Alan Henderson.

After being named Most Valuable Player (MVP) at the prestigious Boston Shootout and acknowledged as the leading participant at the Nike camp, Howard was mentioned as the best prospect in the country. By this time, he had dropped Michigan State and Illinois from his list of possible college destinations and had begun considering UNLV as well. Following his time at the Nike camp, his household was besieged by recruiters. Howard issued the following statement: "Contact my coach. I do not want my grandmother and aunt upset about calls at all times of the day and night. I'm not the only person who lives in this house. I think my wishes should be respected. If not, when it comes time to make my decision, I'll take those things into account." Although Howard was the best performer at the camp, talent scout Bob Gibbons felt Webber and Robinson were equally talented prospects. Despite Howard's most recently listed college preferences and the fact that the team was under investigation for recruiting violations, Illinois continued pursuing Howard as its number one recruit. By the end of July 1990, Howard was projected to sign with Michigan.

=== Senior year ===
During Michigan's in-home visit, Howard's grandmother treated Michigan head coach Fisher, his assistants Mike Boyd and Brian Dutcher, Vocational coach Cook, Vocational assistant coach Donnie Kirskey, Lois Howard (Howard's aunt) and Howard to a soul food dinner. Dutcher had the responsibility to contact Howard several times a week. Howard grew close to assistant coach Kirskey, often staying at his house and using his car once he got a driver's license. During the summer 1990 30-day visitation period, Dutcher watched Howard practice 28 consecutive days. Dutcher developed an understanding of the dynamics of Howard's relationship with his grandmother. While other coaches, such as Lute Olson, almost ignored her during the recruiting, Dutcher understood that she was the key influence on his life, and understood that Kirskey also had sway with Howard. He encouraged Fisher to hire Kirskey for a summer basketball camp, which became the young athlete's introduction to Ann Arbor, Michigan.

Howard was the president of Vocational's Senior Boys' Council. In the final days before his senior season decision regarding his college basketball team, Howard wavered between Arizona State and Michigan. He also made an official visit to Dayton. Despite the ongoing recruiting scandal, he made an unofficial visit to Illinois, which had recruited four of the five previous Chicago Public School League Illinois Players of the Year. At the time of his decision, Howard was considered one of the top five seniors in the country, but unlike many top basketball recruits, he decided not to hold a press conference to announce his choice. Although the official signing period was set for November 14–21, 1990, he selected Michigan on November 2. Howard's grandmother died of a heart attack a few hours after he announced that he would attend Michigan, and he moved in with his high school coach, Richard Cook.

Howard averaged 26.9 points, 8.4 rebounds and 3.4 assists during his senior season, and finished in the top 10 percent of his academic class. He took Vocational to the Public League semifinals where they lost to Westinghouse College Prep, finishing with a 25–5 record, despite his 25 points and 12 rebounds. He befriended Jimmy King when they visited Michigan on the same weekend; according to the Chicago Tribune Fisher Howard influenced King's decision to also enroll there. According to Clyde Travis of the Chicago Sun-Times, Howard's verbal commitment made up for Fisher's failure to recruit Eric Montross the prior year, even though Montross's father and grandfather had played for Michigan. With Jalen Rose, Webber, Howard and King—along with Ray Jackson, a less-heralded prospect—the Michigan recruiting class was considered to be the best in the nation. Some regarded the class as among the greatest recruiting classes of all time.

As a senior, Howard edged Griffith and Kiwane Garris for the most votes to the Sun-Times' annual All-Chicago Public School League boys' basketball team. He was also selected to the All-Area team and was a repeat Class-AA All-State selection. Howard, Kleinschmidt and Robinson were all selected to the 10-member first team of Parade magazine's 40-member high school All-America boys' basketball team. They were also chosen to play in the McDonald's All-America game. West MVP Webber posted 28 points and 12 rebounds in the game; with Howard adding 16 points. The West won 108–106. Howard also earned the Gatorade Circle of Champions' Illinois Player of the Year Award. Howard's ACT test score was high enough to make him eligible under Proposition 48 academic requirements to play as a freshman. Only eight of the top 25 Chicago Public School League players achieved a qualifying score on the test.

== College career ==
=== Freshman year ===
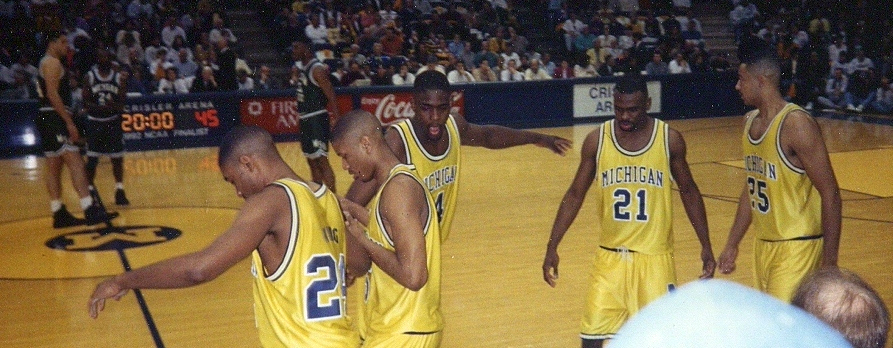
Michigan's Fab Five (left to right) Jimmy King, Jalen Rose, Chris Webber, Ray Jackson, and Howard

Howard matriculated to the University of Michigan and joined his fellow freshmen for the 1991–92 Michigan Wolverines in forming a group that became known as the Fab Five. He also joined future NBA personalities Eric Riley and Rob Pelinka. As Michigan celebrated Midnight Madness on October 15, 1991, there was already talk that at least four of the five freshmen would be starting before the season ended. (The five eventually started in a combined 304 of a possible 350 man-games among them during their first two seasons.) Early in his freshman season, Howard started in some games and came off the bench in others for the highly rated Wolverines. Over time, he won a starting role from Riley. In Michigan's first matchup against Illinois, Howard scored 13 points and denied Thomas the ball consistently enough to hold him to 8 shots. His biggest contribution in the game was getting his hand on a loose ball to force a jump ball with 16 seconds left and Michigan leading by only three points. In the Elite Eight round of the 1992 NCAA Division I men's basketball tournament, Michigan faced a Jimmy Jackson-led Ohio State Buckeyes team that had beaten them twice during the regular season by double-digit margins. Michigan won the rematch, during which the Fab Five scored all but two of the Wolverines' points.

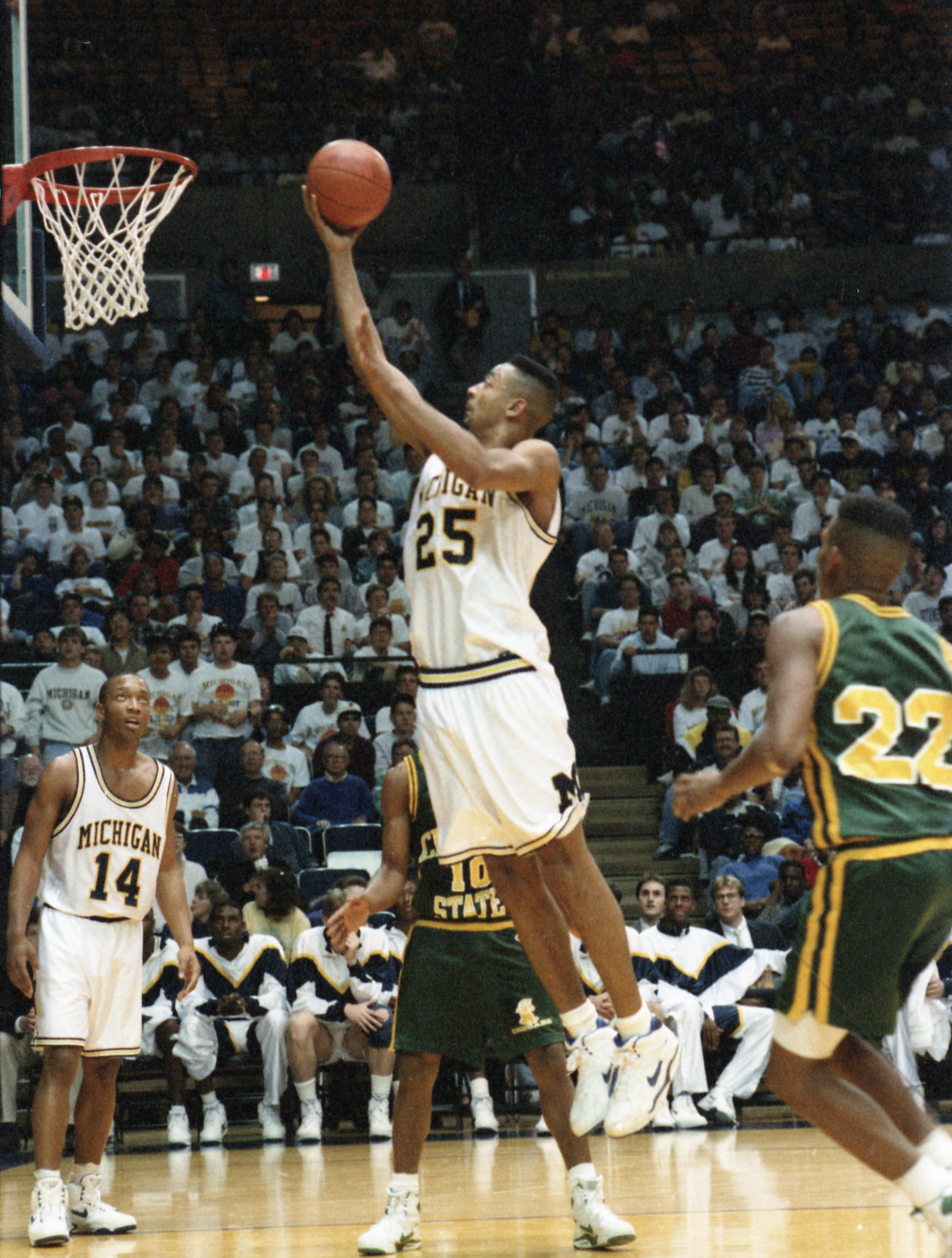
Howard in 1991 playing against Chicago State

The victory gave the 24–8 Wolverines a berth in the Final Four, where they found themselves matched against a 29–4 Bob Huggins-coached Cincinnati Bearcats team that averaged 83.6 points per game and had lost to only three teams, two of which had beaten Michigan. Nick Van Exel led Cincinnati in postseason scoring. Howard, King and Riley shaved their heads for the game. Michigan won and earned a rematch with a Duke Blue Devils team that had beaten them by three points in overtime in December. In the initial contest, Howard had scored only four points. Entering the final game, he was averaging 11.2 points and 6.3 rebounds for the season. The day before the game, Howard had stomach cramps and fever and received fluids to combat dehydration. As a result, he was exempted from mandatory media meetings. Howard was part of a rotation with Webber and Riley that guarded the National Player of the Year, Christian Laettner. During Laettner's first six possessions against Howard, Laettner dribbled the basketball off his foot, missed a shot, threw a pass that resulted in a turnover, traveled, threw the ball away and hit the backboard with a shot. Duke scored in its final 12 possessions of the championship game, going on a 23–6 run to win by a final margin of 71–51. Despite his condition, Howard contributed 9 points in 29 minutes. Howard earned a reputation for his quick feet, ability to grasp fundamentals, and excellent moves in the low post, but also for his 1-to-2 assist-to-turnover ratio and a high number of fouls.

=== Sophomore year ===
As his sophomore year began, media reports alleged that three Wolverines basketball players were paid $300 each to participate in a charity basketball tournament in mid-1992, during the off-season. The reports further alleged that some others, including Howard, appeared at several summer basketball camps together, which was a possible violation of NCAA rules. At the beginning of his 1992–93 sophomore season, Michigan returned its top nine scorers and began the season ranked number one in the country by the Associated Press. Michigan lost its second game of the season in a rematch with Duke. Howard was described as the steadiest player on the team that season by coach Fisher. During the season, Howard purchased a million-dollar disability insurance policy approved by the NCAA under the Exceptional Student Athlete Disability Insurance Program available to student-athletes who are projected to be chosen high in the NBA, National Football League (NFL), and Major League Baseball drafts.

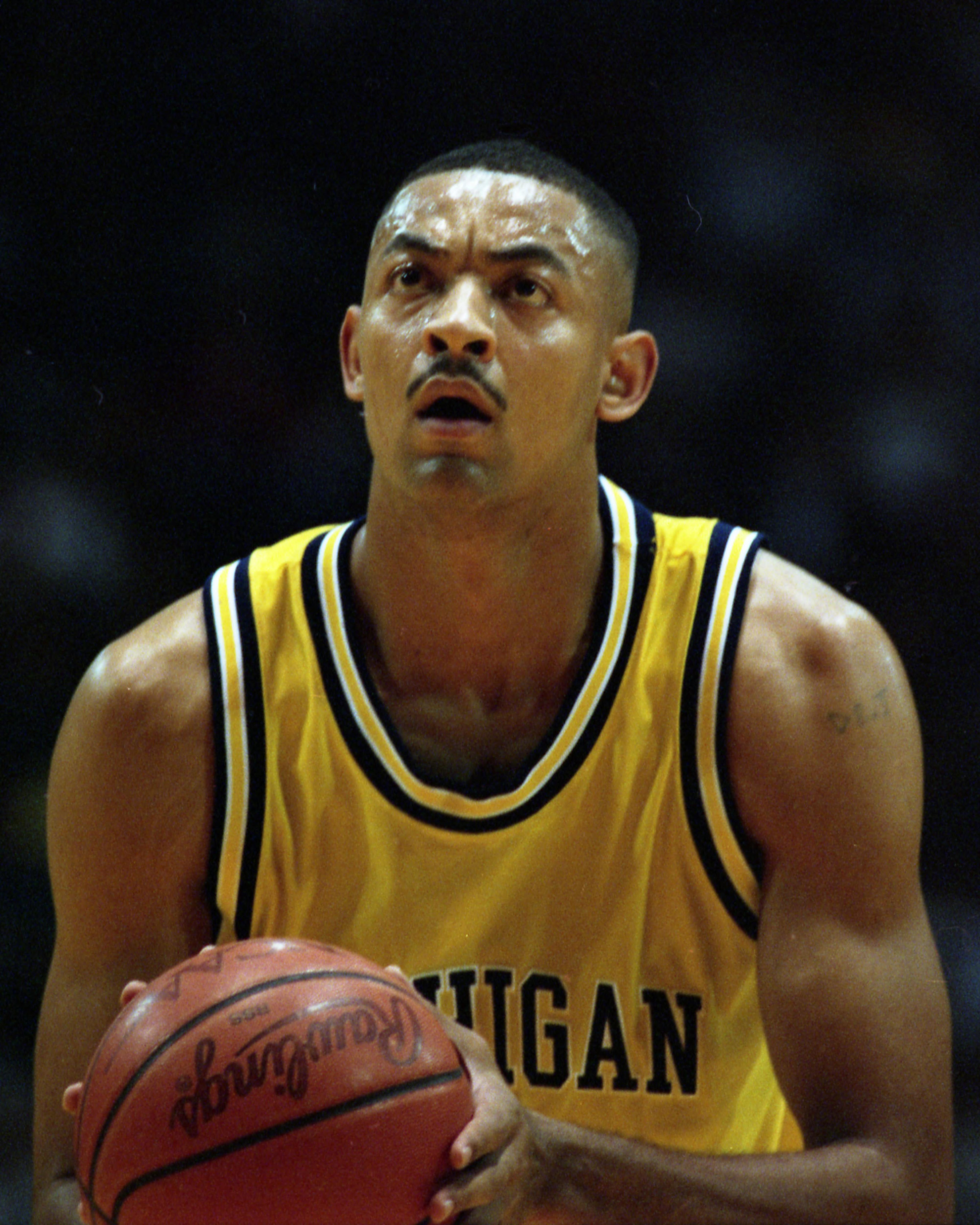
Howard in 1993

In the semifinals of the 1993 NCAA Division I men's basketball tournament against Kentucky, Howard contributed on offense and held Jamal Mashburn in check defensively; Mashburn did not make a field goal in the last 12:36 of regulation. Sportswriter Jay Mariotti wrote that Howard had done "a terrific defensive job" in guarding Mashburn. The 31–4 Wolverines were matched up against the 33–4 North Carolina Tar Heels in the championship game; both Fisher and North Carolina head coach Dean Smith were seeking their second national title. During the championship game Howard picked up his second personal foul with 9 minutes 42 seconds remaining in the first half and was soon substituted out as the entire team dealt with an accumulation of fouls. The game would be remembered for a late technical foul against Webber for attempting to call a time out when the Wolverines had none left; this led to a Tar Heels victory. Over the course of the season, Howard averaged 14.6 points and 7.4 rebounds. After the season, Webber and Howard were invited to try out for the United States national basketball team that would compete at the 1993 World University Games and Under-22 World Championships. Howard did not make the team.

=== Junior year ===
With Webber's departure for the NBA after his sophomore season, the 1993–94 Wolverines team entered the season ranked fifth in the nation as it opened the season against number 13 Georgia Tech. Since his grandmother had been born on December 25, Howard got a tattoo reading "Jannie Mae" over his heart during Christmas break. During the season, Howard contracted the chicken pox in January. Michigan had a 21–6 (13–4 Big Ten) record and tied with the Purdue Boilermakers for the conference lead with one game remaining. Michigan then lost (for the third time in its last four games) to a struggling Northwestern Wildcats team, and finished second in the Big Ten. After the season, Howard was selected as a first team All-Big-Ten member along with his teammate Rose, Purdue's Robinson, Michigan State's Shawn Respert, and Indiana's Damon Bailey. In the opening round of the 1994 NCAA Division I men's basketball tournament, Howard helped Michigan to a 78–74 overtime victory over Pepperdine by scoring 28 points and adding 9 rebounds before fouling out. In the second round, Howard posted 34 points and 18 rebounds to lead the team to an 84–79 victory over Texas. Michigan faced a Joe Smith-led Maryland in the Sweet Sixteen round. Howard scored 24 points and had 11 rebounds before fouling out with 2:49 remaining in the 78–71 victory. Howard earned the regional MVP award with a game-high 30 points and 13 rebounds in the Elite Eight round, despite collecting two fouls in the first two minutes and losing against the Arkansas Razorbacks, which had United States President Bill Clinton in attendance as a vocal supporter.

On April 18, Howard announced his intention to enter the 1994 NBA draft. The following day, Rose announced he would enter the draft as well. Howard was 37 credit hours short of University of Michigan degree requirements, but said he intended to keep his promise to his grandmother that he would earn his diploma. Howard left Michigan after being named an Associated Press third team All-American during his junior year, and was taken by the Washington Bullets fifth overall in the 1994 NBA Draft. Howard was represented by David Falk.

=== Graduation ===
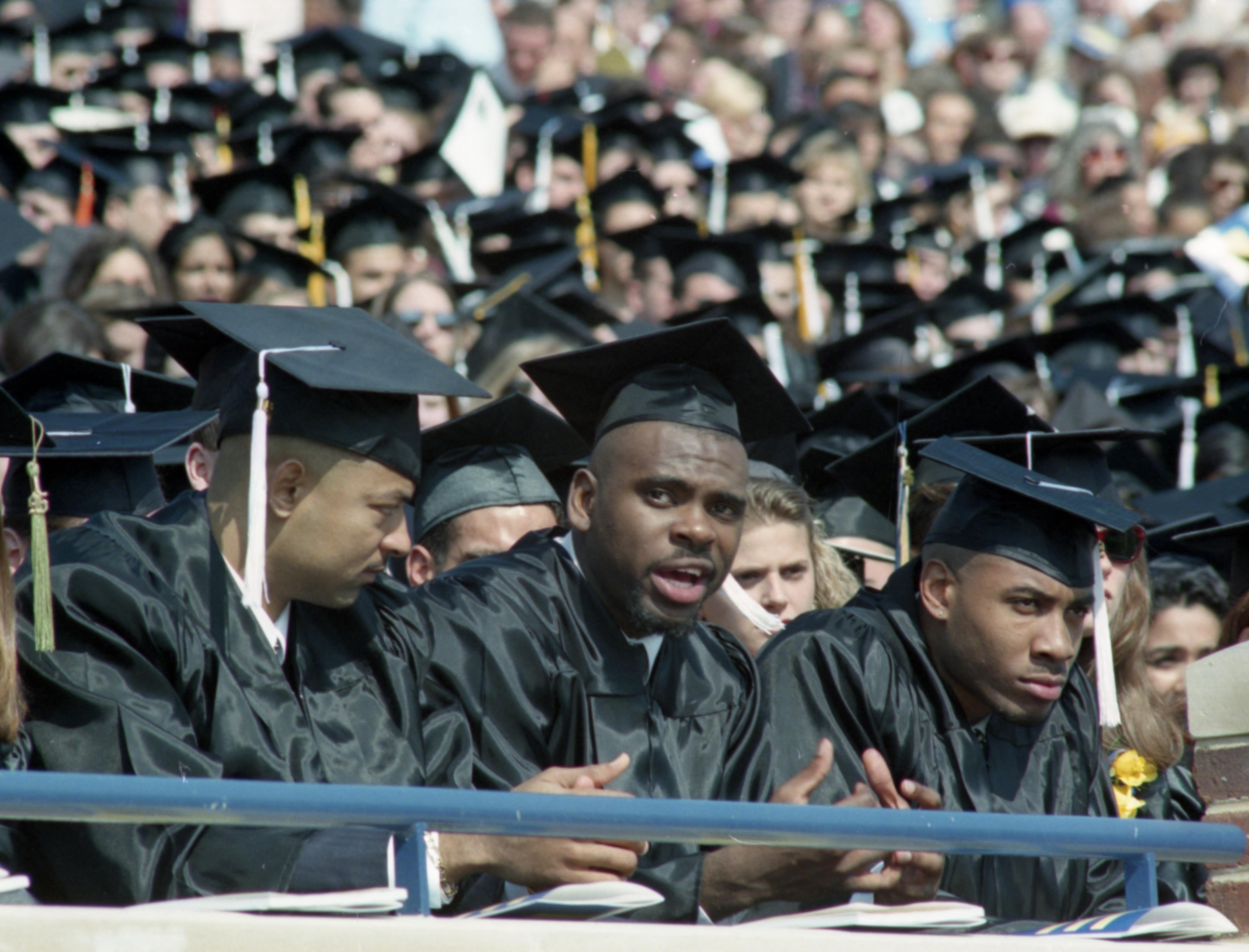
Howard with King and Jackson at their graduation ceremony

Howard became the first NBA athlete who entered the draft early and graduated with his academic class, thus fulfilling a promise he had made to his grandmother on the last day he saw her alive. He told Mitch Albom that when he made it to the NBA, he realized how much leisure time the multimillionaire players had and decided to do something productive instead of find ways to spend his new riches. "I knew if I kept pushing it off, I'd never get it done", he said. He completed his final 32 course hours by taking summer classes in 1994 during the NBA off-season. He took correspondence classes and independent study courses during the following season, studying on road trips and mailing in his papers from the nearest post office. In the end, he earned a Bachelor of Arts degree in communications at Michigan. He told Albom that earning his degree made him a better example when speaking about staying in school. Although Howard had spent the prior year playing in the NBA, he returned to campus to partake in graduation ceremonies with his classmates. During the graduation, keynote speaker Marian Wright Edelman paid special recognition to Howard and Fab Five teammates King and Jackson, who graduated together, and noted that Howard's graduation made him a role model for children.

=== Forfeits ===
Although the Fab Five's games in the Final Four have since been forfeited, Howard was not among the players, which included Robert Traylor, Webber, Rose, Maurice Taylor, and Louis Bullock, called before a grand jury to testify in the University of Michigan basketball scandal. He was not implicated in the scandal. Although Michigan erased many of its records and accomplishments from 1992 to 1998 as part of self-imposed sanctions, Howard's status as a 1993–94 All-American remained intact.

== Professional career ==
=== Washington Bullets / Wizards (1994–2001) ===
==== 1994–95 season: Rookie season ====
Entering the 1994–95 season, the NBA players and owners had not yet agreed on the terms of a new collective bargaining agreement, and Howard was unsigned two weeks before training camp began. He continued to train in Chicago in late September amidst rumors that his draft rights could be traded to another team. While holding out, he was rumored to be part of a trade package with the Chicago Bulls that included Calbert Cheaney and a first-round draft choice in exchange for Scottie Pippen. Another rumor had Howard being packaged with Rex Chapman and Don MacLean for Pippen. On November 9, eleventh overall 1994 NBA draft selection Carlos Rogers signed an NBA contract, making Howard the last first-round selection without a contract. He missed most of the first month of the season and resided at an O'Hare Airport hotel while protracted talks continued. Howard's agent David Falk said that one of the main problems was that the Bullets wanted Howard to sign for a lower average salary than number six selection Sharone Wright. The Bullets stuck to a 10-year, $30 million ($65.2 million in 2025 dollars) offer. On November 17, Howard signed what was believed to be a 12-year, $37.5 million ($81.5 million) contract. Howard's contract, which Sports Illustrated later said was an 11-year $36 million ($78.2 million) deal, had an escape clause. Once he signed, he was reunited with Michigan teammate Webber as a member of the Bullets. Webber, who had also sat out training camp and the first eight games of the season, was traded from the Golden State Warriors to the Bullets on November 18 for Tom Gugliotta and three first-round draft choices.

After Webber joined the Bullets, many thought that the two former Fab Five members would bring success to the team, coached by Lynam. The Washington front line was expected to include Webber, Howard, and Kevin Duckworth and to have Gheorghe Mureșan, a 7-foot-7-inch (231 cm) Romanian center, coming off the bench. Chapman, MacLean, Cheaney, Mitchell Butler and Scott Skiles were expected to provide solid perimeter play. Experts projected the Bullets as contenders for the Eastern Conference title. The Howard/Webber Bullets debut against the Boston Celtics established new Bullets television ratings records for the Home Team Sports network. However, the early season trade left the team in a state of confusion due to lack of familiarity, which resulted in communication difficulties on the court. Howard eventually moved into the starting lineup. As a power forward, Howard posted impressive numbers after he became a regular starter. Howard participated in the February 11, 1995, NBA All-Star weekend events as a member of the Rookie Challenge. He earned second team All-Rookie honors at the end of the season. That month, he became the second Bullet (since the award's inception in 1981) and first since Jeff Ruland in January 1982 to be named NBA Rookie of the Month. During the month he averaged 20.1 points, 8 rebounds and 1.2 blocks in 14 games, including his first two 30-point games. The following month Howard suffered an ankle injury, missing a total of 10 games (all of which were Bullets losses). Over the course of the season, he averaged 17.0 points per game and posted 17 double-doubles in 65 games played (52 starts). He totalled 30 points or more on three separate occasions.

At the end of his rookie season Howard finished his undergraduate degree, and graduated from the University of Michigan, becoming the first NBA player to graduate after leaving college early.

==== 1995–96 season: All-Star selection ====
In the preseason, the Bullets played the Detroit Pistons in an October game at the University of Michigan's Crisler Arena, marking a homecoming for Howard. Webber was sidelined with a shoulder injury and missed the homecoming. Prior to the 1995–96 season, the Bullets were expected to be a contender with Webber, Howard, Muresan, Mark Price, and Robert Pack. However, Webber, Price and Pack missed almost the entire year (65, 75 and 51 games, respectively) because of injuries.

Howard earned his only career NBA All-Star Game selection for the February 11, 1996 game. He concluded the season by scoring at least 20 points in his last 16 games. Howard became just the second player in Washington franchise history, after Bernard King, to post back-to-back 40-point games (against Boston on April 17, 1996, with 40, and at Toronto on April 19, 1996, with 42). The 42 points proved to be his career high. His strong finish earned him an NBA Player of the Month award for April. In spite of the injuries to key teammates, 1995–96 was Howard's best season, statistically. During the season, he finished third in the NBA in minutes played, 6th in points scored and 10th in points per game (22.1). He was the Bullets' leading scorer. Over the course of the season, he accumulated 22 double-doubles in 81 games, including 6 in his last 8 games. At the end of the season, he was named to the All-NBA team. In addition to his two 40-point performances, he posted 3 additional 30-point performances and scored at least 20 points in 56 of 81 games. Averaging 22.1 points, 8.1 rebounds and 4.4 assists, he helped the Bullets record 39 victories. This was not enough for the Bullets to make the playoffs during their ninth consecutive losing season.

==== 1996–97 season: Free agency dispute ====
After averaging 17 points per game as a rookie and more than 22 per game in his second season, Howard became a free agent when the Bullets made some salary cap transactions. The Bullets offered Howard an $89 million contract, but the Miami Heat outbid them with a seven-year deal estimated to be worth $98 to $101 million. However, according to the NBA league office, the Heat miscalculated their available salary under the salary cap by excluding performance bonuses for Tim Hardaway and P. J. Brown and failing to account for the impact of renegotiating Alonzo Mourning's contract before coming to terms with Howard. The league rejected the contract on July 31 because Howard's $9 million for the 1996–97 season placed the Heat over the cap. Howard then re-signed with the Bullets on August 5. He became the first player in NBA history to sign a contract worth more than $100 million; his seven-year contract was worth $105 million (equivalent to $216,000,000 in 2025). The league ruled on August 5 that the Bullets could re-sign Howard after having renounced his rights on July 15 to free up cap room to sign Tracy Murray and Lorenzo Williams if they forfeited their 1997 NBA draft first-round selection rights. The Bullets were not limited by the cap because they were re-signing their own player. The Heat pursued legal remedy in Florida state courts, seeking acknowledgment of the prior validity and superiority of their earlier contract. Although an arbitration case involving the two contracts that Howard had signed appeared likely, ESPN reported that the Heat dropped their legal pursuit of Howard. The league moved for federal jurisdiction although the case remained on the docket for New York University Law professor Daniel Collins to serve as arbitrator on three issues. Meanwhile, the Heat's contract was protected by a temporary injunction in Florida state court, which forbade any newer contract by Howard from abrogating his Miami contract. The Heat eventually dropped their case but the team, especially head coach Pat Riley, continued to vehemently claim that their case of wrongdoing in the form of erroneous rulings by the league had been very solid. If the Heat had pursued arbitration and had been found guilty of violating the salary cap, the team could have been fined $5 million and Heat coach Riley could have been suspended for the season. By dropping their actions, the Heat avoided any possible penalties.

As a statement against gun violence, Bullets owner Abe Pollin sought to change the franchise's name. The Bullets became the Washington Wizards after asking fans to vote on the name. Although before the 1996–97 NBA season the Bullets/Wizards were expected to make the playoffs with Webber, Howard, and Strickland, there were rumors that Webber had difficulty adjusting to being a less important part of the offensive game plan in the presence of All-Star Howard. Howard was plagued with shin splints, causing him to miss several preseason games. On November 11, 1996, Howard failed a sobriety test when he was caught speeding and was charged with driving while intoxicated. The following month he pleaded not guilty and committed to enter an alcohol rehabilitation and education program. After Lynam coached the Bullets to a 22–24 record, he was fired and the Bullets hired Bernie Bickerstaff, who posted a 22–13 record. Over the course of the 1996–97 season, Howard accumulated 24 double-doubles in 82 games, while averaging 19.1 points and 8.1 rebounds. Although Howard averaged over 19 points per game and played all 82 games, he only scored 30 or more points twice during the regular season. The team finished its regular season with a 44–38 record but was swept in three games in the Eastern Conference first round by the Chicago Bulls, who went on to win their second consecutive NBA championship. The 1997 NBA Playoffs were Howard's only NBA playoff appearance in his six-plus seasons with the Washington franchise, and he averaged 18.7 points and 6 rebounds while playing 43 minutes per game. The playoff appearance marked the franchise's first since the 1988.

==== 1997–98 season ====
The Wizards relocated from the US Airways Arena to the MCI Center for the 1997–98 season, during which Howard totaled 11 double-doubles in 64 games, while averaging 18.5 points and 8.0 rebounds. He scored between 20 and 29 points 31 times that season but failed to score 30 points in any game. Howard injured his ankle and was unable to play between February 5 and March 17. During Bickerstaff's only full season as the Washington coach, the team posted a 42–40 record.

==== 1998–99 season ====
After the 1998–99 NBA lockout, the Wizards posted an 18–32 record in the shortened season. The team started out 13–19 under Bickerstaff and was 5–13 under Jim Brovelli after Bickerstaff was fired. Howard was a vocal critic of Bickerstaff throughout his tenure, stating the coach was unable to make proper in-game adjustments. Howard, who again had an ankle injury, missed the last 14 games of the season. Over the course of the 1998–99 season, he posted 11 double-doubles and two 15-rebound performances in 36 games, while averaging 18.9 points and 7.0 rebounds.

==== 1999–00 season ====
During the 1999–2000 season, Howard accumulated 10 double-doubles in 82 games, while averaging 14.9 points and 8.1 rebounds. The Wizards endured a 14–30 start under head coach Gar Heard before going 15–23 under Heard's replacement, Darrell Walker. According to Sam Smith from the Chicago Tribune, Howard had become unpopular and a bit of a disappointment by his sixth season in Washington. He posted 30 points twice, including a season-high 36 in a fourth-quarter comeback to end a five-game losing streak in January. During the offseason, Howard's name surfaced in trade rumors that had him going to the New York Knicks in exchange for Ewing because the Wizards' management thought that the trade would better position the team for the 2001 free agent market. Following the season, Walker was replaced by Leonard Hamilton, becoming the team's sixth head coach since last making the NBA playoffs four years earlier.

==== 2000–01 season ====
Although it had been five years since his only All-Star appearance, Howard was the fourth-highest-paid player in the NBA during the 2000–01 season, behind Kevin Garnett, Shaquille O'Neal and Mourning. Howard, along with Strickland and Richmond, were marquee names on the team under contract to earn at least $10 million. On December 31, 2000, Howard, posted his career high of 15 made free throws in a game against the Detroit Pistons.

=== Dallas Mavericks (2001–2002) ===
Michael Jordan, who had become the Wizards' head of basketball operations the prior season, traded Howard, Obinna Ekezie, and Calvin Booth to the Dallas Mavericks for Laettner, Loy Vaught, Etan Thomas, Hubert Davis, Courtney Alexander and $3 million on February 22, 2001, at the NBA trade deadline. Jordan's move was praised for freeing up salary cap space in advance of the NBA's first season with a luxury tax. The trade served the Mavericks by giving them a new offensive weapon and enabling them to match up defensively against the NBA Western Conference power forwards such as Wallace, Tim Duncan, Karl Malone and Webber. Washington finished the year with a 19–63 record under coach Hamilton.

During the 2000–01 season, the Mavericks finished 53–29 under coach Don Nelson. Howard provided the Mavericks with a back-to-the-basket player who moved into the starting power-forward position, enabling Dirk Nowitzki to play small forward and Shawn Bradley to play center. During the season, Howard tallied 16 double-doubles and five 30-point performances in 81 games, while averaging 18.0 points and 7.1 rebounds. On a team with All-Star Michael Finley and future MVPs Steve Nash and Nowitzki, Howard was the highest-paid player. On March 20, Howard blocked five shots, his career high, against the Portland Trail Blazers. In the 2001 NBA Playoffs, the Mavericks advanced past the Utah Jazz 3 games to 2 before losing to the San Antonio Spurs, 4 games to 1. The Utah games marked the first time Howard played for a team that won an NBA playoff series. In the first game of the series against the Spurs, Howard slammed Spurs guard Derek Anderson to the floor while trying to block Anderson's layup late in the game. Anderson suffered a separated shoulder on the play, and Howard received a flagrant foul and was ejected. After the game, Howard, Spurs coach Gregg Popovich, and Mavs owner Mark Cuban all said the foul was committed without malice or intent to injure Anderson. In the Mavericks' 10 playoff games, Howard totaled three double-doubles while averaging 13.4 points and 8.3 rebounds in 39.1 minutes.

During the 2001–02 season, he posted 17 double-doubles and three 30-point performances in 81 games (72 starts), while averaging 14.6 points and 7.6 rebounds. This was the first time since his rookie holdout season that he did not start every game he played in. All reserve appearances occurred between November 21 and December 11, and eight of them were in consecutive games between November 21 and December 5. On January 31, he posted a career-high 16 rebounds against the Houston Rockets.

=== Denver Nuggets (2002–2003) ===
The Mavericks traded Howard with Donnell Harvey, Hardaway and a 2002 first-round pick to the Denver Nuggets for Raef LaFrentz, Avery Johnson, Van Exel and Tariq Abdul-Wahad on February 21, 2002. At the time of the trade, Howard was considered the Mavericks' best low-post defender. On March 25, 2002, he scored his 10,000th career point at Madison Square Garden against the New York Knicks. Howard started all 28 games that he played for the Nuggets. Don Nelson's Mavericks went to the second round of the 2002 NBA Playoffs after trading Howard, while the Nuggets failed to make the playoffs under coaches Dan Issel and Mike Evans. By the end of the season, Nuggets general manager Vandeweghe had cleared almost $20 million of salary cap space, leaving the team with few veterans and only Howard and Marcus Camby as well-known players. This made the team an undesirable coaching assignment for veteran coaches. In the offseason, the Nuggets replaced Evans with the relatively unknown Jeff Bzdelik.

During a preseason game, Howard attempted to punch Al Harrington and Jermaine O'Neal, which earned him a suspension on October 25, 2002. As a result, Howard missed the Nuggets' first two games of the regular season, and this cost him $458,000 in salary. Howard first attempted to hit Harrington late in the fourth quarter on a night when Howard had missed nine of ten shots. When O'Neal intervened, the two pushed and shoved each other before Howard started punching again. At around the same time, the University of Michigan basketball scandal investigation came to an end with many of the accomplishments of the Fab Five being rescinded through National Collegiate Athletic Association sanctions. Although many of the records of the Fab Five were erased, Howard's and teammate Rose's 1994 All-American recognitions were unaffected by the scandal. During the 2002–03 regular season, he accumulated 18 double-doubles, two 30-point performances, and three 15-rebound performances in 77 games, while averaging 18.4 points and 7.6 rebounds. The 2002–03 Nuggets were 17–65 under Bzdelik. Howard started all 77 games in which he played. The team struggled with three rookies in the starting lineup.

=== Orlando Magic (2003–2004) ===
Howard signed what was believed to be a five-year, $28 million contract as a free agent with the Orlando Magic on July 16, 2003; he had been expected to sign with either Detroit or Minnesota. During the season, teammate Tracy McGrady successfully defended his scoring championship, while Howard attempted to be a positive influence when the situation arose, such as when he attempted to stop McGrady from kicking the basketball into the stands twice in a row. McGrady missed the last 10 games of the season with knee problems (ending his season on March 24), leading to Howard's best performances of the season: Howard had 33 points and 11 rebounds on April 2 against the Atlanta Hawks, and he had 38 points on April 12 against the Chicago Bulls. Over the course of the 2003–04 season, he had 16 double-doubles and two 30-point performances in 81 games (77 starts), while averaging 17.2 points and 7.1 rebounds. The team compiled a 21–61 record, the worst in the NBA, under coaches Doc Rivers and Johnny Davis.

=== Houston Rockets (2004–2007) ===
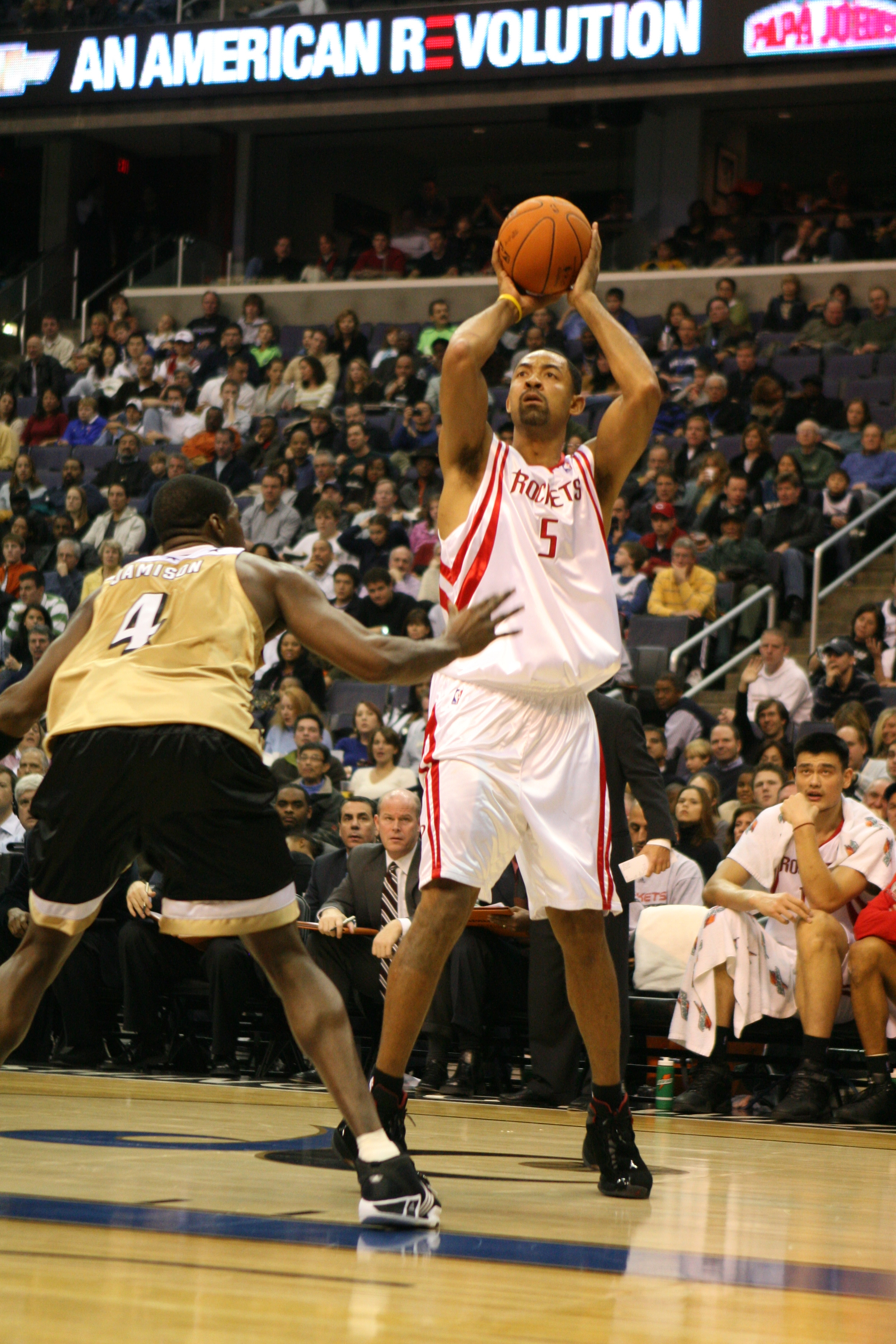
Howard shooting over Antawn Jamison as Yao Ming looks on

On June 29, 2004, Howard and Magic teammates McGrady, Tyronn Lue and Reece Gaines were part of a seven-player trade that sent 2003–04 Houston Rockets starting guards Steve Francis and Cuttino Mobley, plus Kelvin Cato, to the Magic. Howard became the regular starting power forward on December 2 and started for the rest of the season.

The 2004–05 Rockets were 51–31 under Van Gundy and lost in the first round of the 2005 NBA playoffs to the Dallas Mavericks, four games to three. Although the Rockets made the playoffs, Howard's season ended on March 14, when he left a game with a sprained medial collateral ligament (MCL) in his right knee. Initially, the injury was supposed to sideline Howard for four weeks. The injury coincided with a period in which he developed symptoms of viral myocarditis, including heart palpitations, mild chest pains and fever and was diagnosed with a viral infection in his heart. His limited physical activity impaired his MCL rehabilitation. Over the course of the 2004–05 season, Howard achieved seven double-doubles in 61 games (47 starts), while averaging 9.6 points and 5.7 rebounds.

During the 2005–06 season, Howard recorded 10 double-doubles and two 30-point performances in 80 games (all as a starter), while averaging 11.8 points and 6.7 rebounds. He played 31.7 minutes per game, and this was the last season in which he averaged 30 minutes per game; this was also the final season in which Howard started at least half of the games in which he played. The Rockets were 34–48 under Van Gundy and missed the playoffs. Howard was suspended one game without pay in January for shoving the basketball into the face of Toronto guard Mike James in an exchange that occurred after Howard fouled James on a drive to the basket. Howard posted a season-high 31 points on April 17, 2006, against the Denver Nuggets.

In the 2006–07 season, Howard achieved nine double-doubles in 80 games played (37 starts), while averaging 9.7 points and 5.9 rebounds. His 26.5 minutes per game marked a new career low. Howard only started 38 games, including 32 consecutive starts between December 26, 2006, and March 3, 2007. The 2006–07 Rockets were 52–30 under Van Gundy for the regular season. The Rockets entered the 2007 NBA Playoffs with little experience; Howard was one of only three players on the team (along with Rafer Alston and Dikembe Mutombo) to have previously won any NBA playoff series. Once the playoffs began, Howard served as a key reserve on the Rockets' short bench rotation that also included Luther Head and Mutombo. The Rockets managed to split the first 4 games even though Head and Howard only combined to average 7.6 points, including a combined pointless 0-for-10 game three. Although Howard had a productive game five with 12 points and 6 rebounds which contributed to a Rockets victory, the team lost in the first round of the 2007 playoffs to the Utah Jazz, four games to three. In the playoffs, reserve Howard averaged 5.0 points and 4.4 rebounds in 22.4 minutes.

=== Return to Dallas (2007–2008) ===
On June 14, 2007, Howard was traded to the Minnesota Timberwolves for Mike James and Justin Reed. According to ESPN, he regretted not choosing Minnesota the last time he had been a free agent and was looking forward to playing with Garnett. Soon after Howard signed with Minnesota, the team traded Garnett to the Boston Celtics. Howard made it clear he was not interested in being on a team in Minnesota that was focused on developing young talent and consequently requested a trade once Garnett was no longer a member of the team. Howard still had $6.88 million and $7.38 million in salary owed to him over the next two seasons, which made him difficult to trade. Timberwolves owner Glen Taylor noted that the team would attempt to accommodate his wishes but acknowledged that doing so would be difficult. On October 29, 2007, the Timberwolves waived Howard after agreeing to a contractual buyout agreement worth $10 million spread over four years instead of the roughly $14.25 million ($6.88 million plus $7.38 million) that Minnesota would otherwise have owed him.

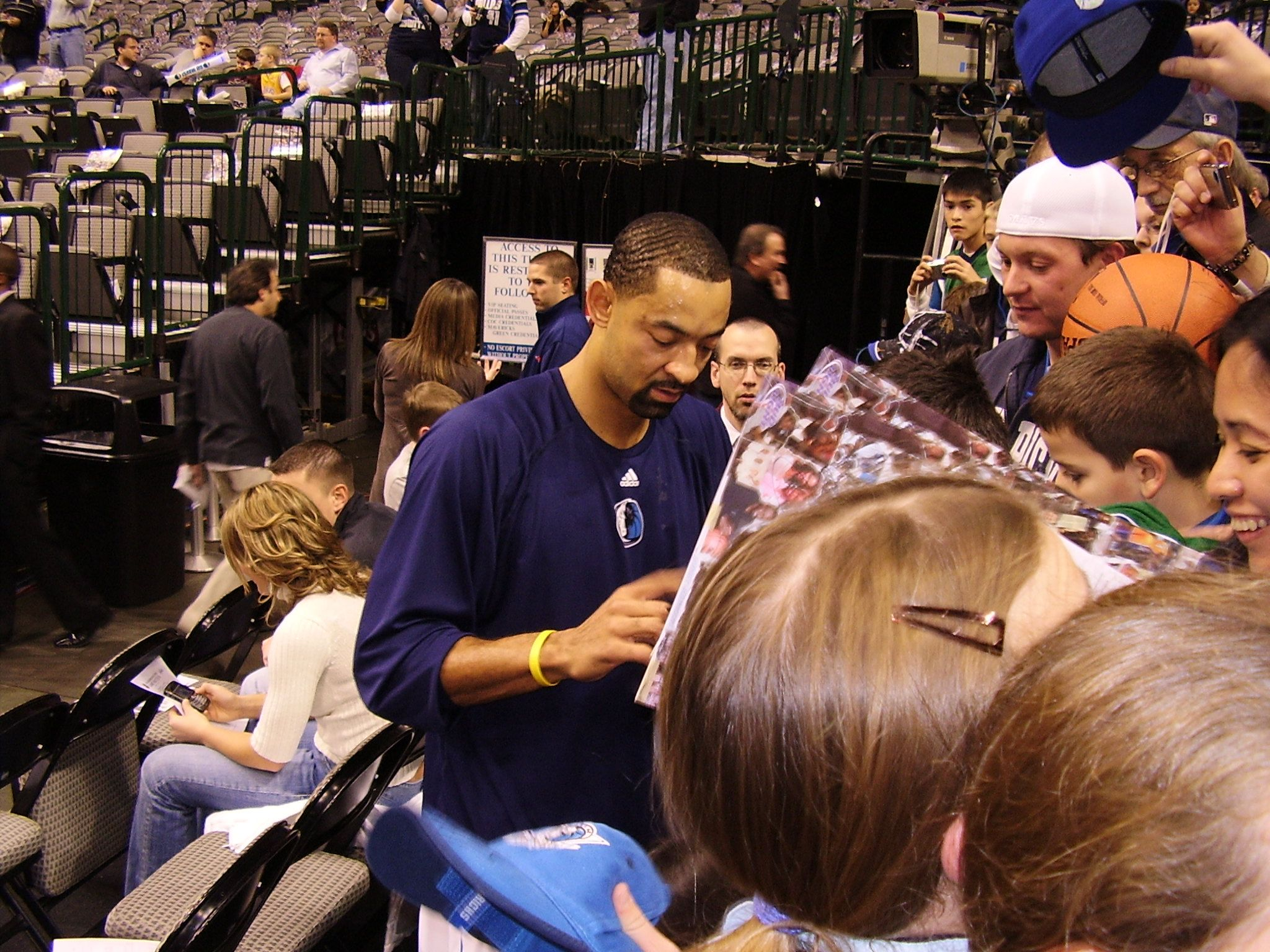
Howard signing autographs as a Dallas Maverick

Howard agreed to terms with the Dallas Mavericks on October 30, 2007, but was not able to officially sign until the next day, when he cleared waivers. Terms of the deal were not disclosed publicly. During the 2007–08 season, he played in 50 games and made no starts, while averaging 1.1 points and 1.6 rebounds. In his limited role he never played more than 18 minutes and had season-highs of seven rebounds and six points. The 2007–08 Mavericks were 51–31 under coach Johnson and lost in the first round of the 2008 NBA Playoffs to the New Orleans Hornets four games to one. In the playoffs, Howard only appeared for a total of 11 minutes in three games. This was the first season in Howard's career in which he did not start in a single game.

=== Return to Denver (2008) ===
On October 3, 2008, Howard rejoined the Denver Nuggets, but was later released when the Nuggets made a three-for-one trade of Allen Iverson for Chauncey Billups, Antonio McDyess and Cheikh Samb on November 3 that put them over the 15-man roster size limit. Before the trade, Howard had played in three games during the 2008–09 season.

=== Charlotte Bobcats (2008–2009) ===
On December 12, 2008, he was signed by the Charlotte Bobcats. During the 2008–09 season, he played in 42 games, making two starts; Howard averaged 4.1 points and 1.8 rebounds. In his reserve role, he played more than 20 minutes five times, including four straight appearances from January 28 to February 8, and had season-highs of five rebounds and 14 points. He posted 10 or more points five times. Howard played extended minutes on January 28, the night after Gerald Wallace suffered a left-lung collapse and a non-displaced fracture of the fifth rib from a flagrant foul by Andrew Bynum; in 24 minutes of action, he scored 9 points. During Howard's streak of 20-minute appearances, he sat out one intervening game on February 6 with a toe injury. On February 8, in only his second start as a Bobcat, he played a season-high 30 minutes, 39 seconds and posted a season-high 14 points. The subsequent night, Howard was out of the lineup again with a toe injury. The 2008–09 Bobcats were 35–47 under coach Larry Brown.

=== Portland Trail Blazers (2009–2010) ===
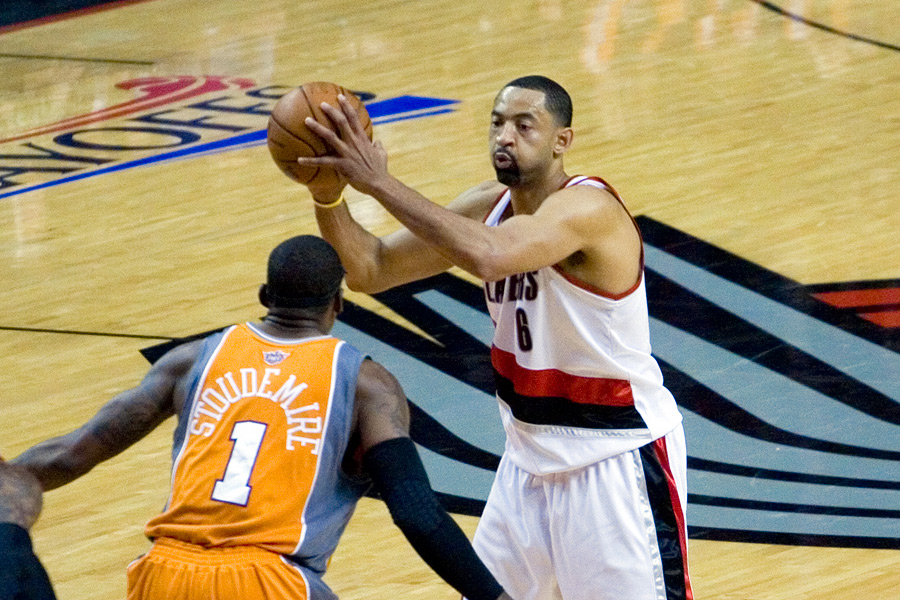
Howard as a Portland Trail Blazer against Amar'e Stoudemire

On September 17, 2009, Howard signed a one-year contract with the Portland Trail Blazers. On December 22, center Joel Przybilla injured his knee in the first quarter, allowing Howard to play additional minutes, which allowed Howard his first double-double since April 6, 2007. He had his other double-double of the 2009–10 season the next night when he made his first start of the season. All of Howard's performances with 10 rebounds or more occurred between December 22 and February 3. December 23 marked the start of 14 consecutive starting appearances and 24 starts in 26 appearances (ending on February 16) for him. Having lost Przybilla and Greg Oden for the season, Portland acquired Camby from the Los Angeles Clippers for Steve Blake and Travis Outlaw on February 17 prior to the trade deadline. During the 2009–10 season, he accumulated two double-doubles, played in 73 games, and made 27 starts, while averaging 6.0 points and 4.6 rebounds. The 2009–10 Trail Blazers were 50–32 under coach Nate McMillan and lost in the first round of the 2010 NBA Playoffs to the Phoenix Suns, four games to two. Howard appeared in all six games, averaging 3.3 points and 2.7 rebounds in 14.5 minutes. He played the most minutes (17:51) in game 4, when he added 8 points and 7 rebounds to help even the series.

=== Miami Heat (2010–2013) ===
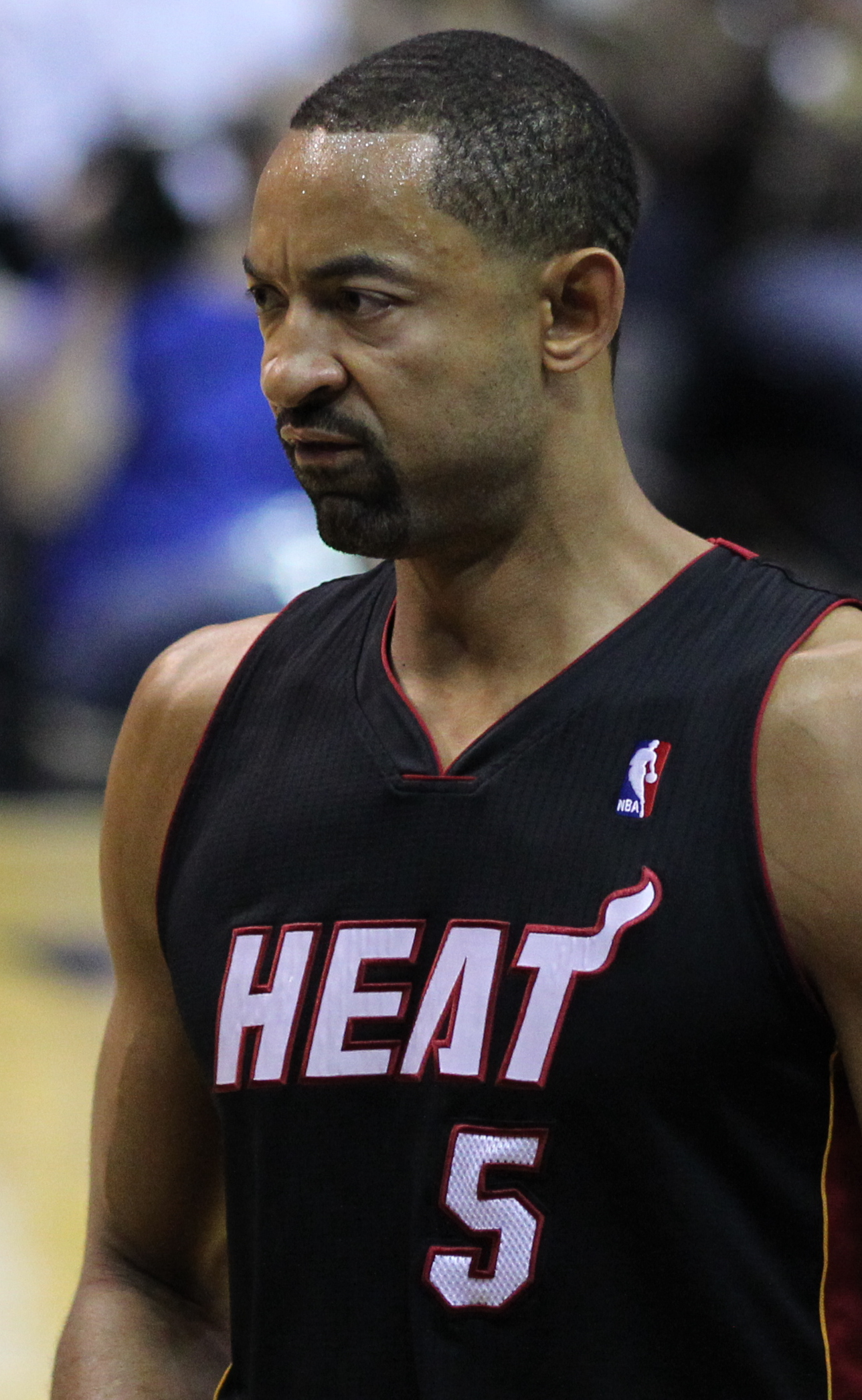
Howard with the Heat in 2011

On July 20, 2010, Howard came to terms for the 2010–11 NBA season with the Miami Heat on a one-year contract for the veteran's minimum salary, which was $1,352,181. Although he was only paid the minimum by the Heat, he was in the final year of his four-year buyout from the Timberwolves. By joining the Heat, Howard joined a team that by the time of the 2011 NBA playoffs, included former champion Dwyane Wade as well as a group of players such as LeBron James and Chris Bosh. In March, he was featured in the documentary film The Fab Five, which was about his time as a Wolverine, that reignited controversy and reinvigorated the Duke–Michigan basketball rivalry. For the season, Howard played 57 games for the 2010–11 Heat, all as a reserve. He averaged 2.4 points and 2.1 rebounds with season highs of 18 points and 7 rebounds. The Heat reached the NBA Finals, losing to the Dallas Mavericks four games to two. Howard averaged 1.5 points and .9 rebounds per game during the postseason.

On December 10, 2011, Howard re-signed with the Heat for the same veteran's minimum salary as the year before. Howard appeared in 28 regular season games as a reserve with limited minutes. At age 39, Howard was the third-oldest active player in the league during the 2011–12 NBA season, behind Kurt Thomas and Grant Hill. On June 21, 2012, Howard became the first and only member of the Fab Five to win an NBA championship, as a role player on the 2011–12 Miami Heat. Following the season, Howard became an unrestricted free agent. At the 20th annual ESPY Awards, Howard and Heat teammate Mike Miller took to the stage to accept the award for Team of the Year.

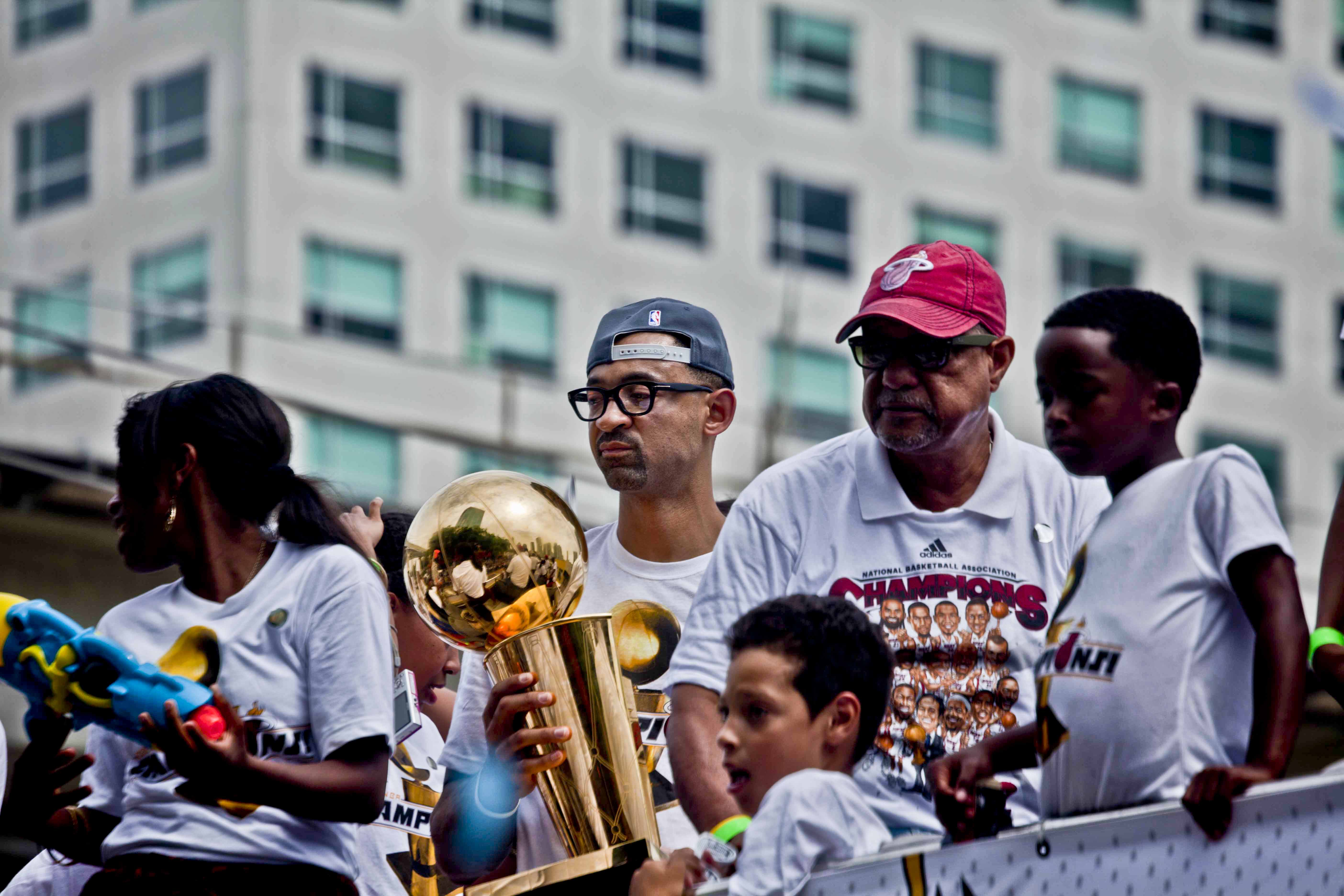
Howard holding the Larry O'Brien Trophy at the Heat's 2012 championship parade

On March 2, 2013, Howard signed a 10-day contract with the 2012–13 Miami Heat. On March 12, 2013, he signed a second 10-day contract with the Heat, and on March 22, 2013, he was signed for the remainder of the season. He made his first appearance of the season for the Heat on March 24 against the Charlotte Bobcats tallying two points, a rebound and two assists in three minutes of play as the Heat made their way to their 26th consecutive victory. On April 15, he made his first start since April 14, 2010, as the Heat defeated the Cleveland Cavaliers without James, Wade, Bosh, Battier, Chalmers and Udonis Haslem in the penultimate game of the regular season. Howard's April 17 start in the season finale against the Orlando Magic marked Howard's 900th career start. With the retirement of Grant Hill on June 1, 2013, Howard became the oldest active player in the NBA at age 40. During the playoffs, Howard did not play.

== Player profile ==
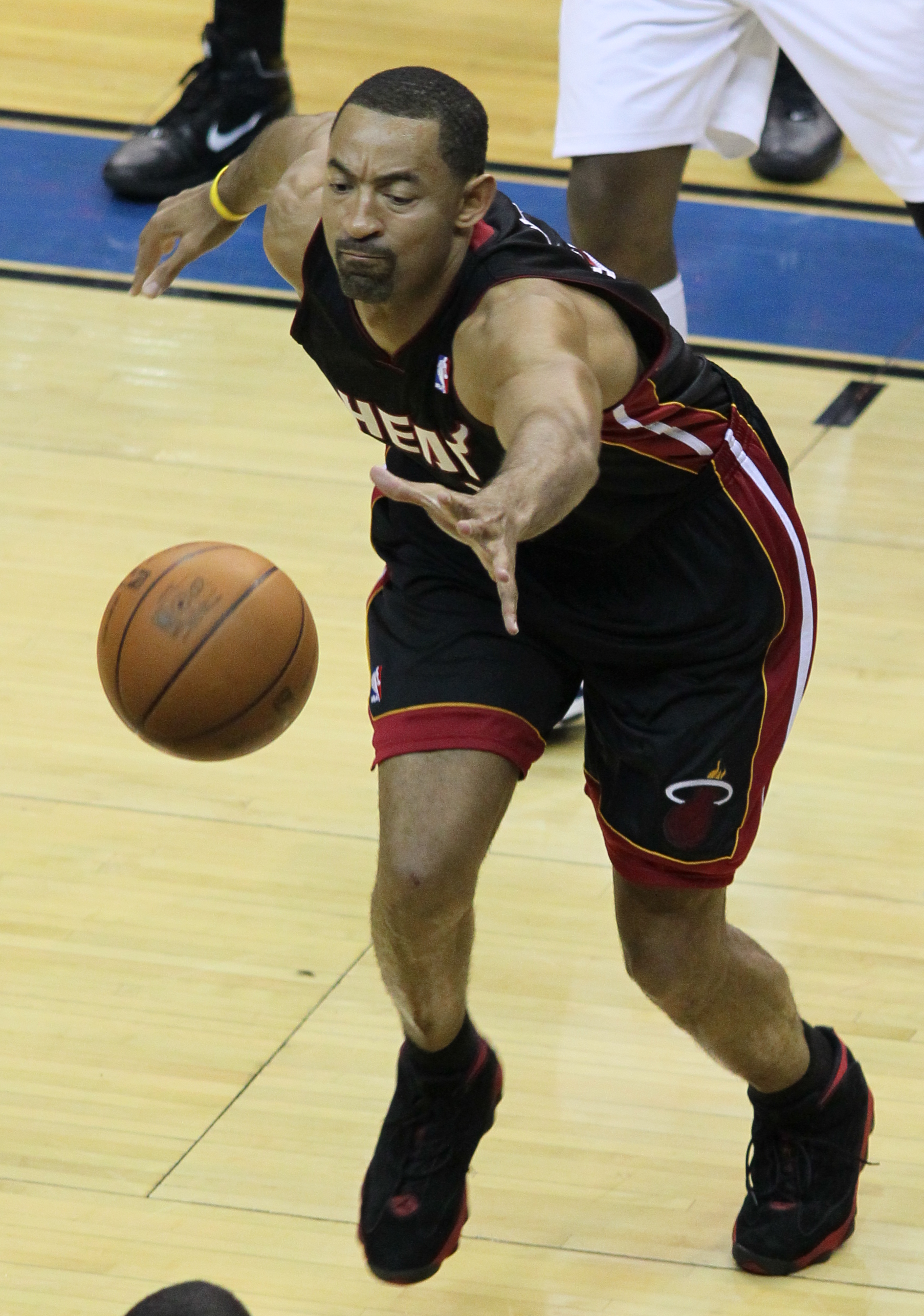
Howard diving for a loose ball in 2010

In college, Howard was regarded as one of the best defensive big men in the country. According to Mariotti, he was also regarded as a "rock-solid" power forward who provided rebounds and defense, in contrast to his flamboyant teammate Webber. Fisher referred to Howard as his "Rock of Gibraltar". His consistency was described by Chicago Tribune journalist Skip Myslenski as Michigan's "ballast, steadying them on those many occasions when they wavered. And their savior, rescuing them from their many follies".

After the 1994 draft, NBA analyst Doug Collins described Howard as a player who could "play with his back to the basket" and "shoot from about 16 feet outside" and who played "with a lot of energy and emotion". The Bullets' general manager, John Nash, who was disappointed that Jason Kidd was no longer available at the fifth pick of the draft, told Jerry Bembry of The Baltimore Sun that Howard was "as fundamentally sound as any player in the draft" and that he "[had] a discipline about his game and [used] a high level of skill and technique". Bembry said, "Not only can Howard post up, he passes effectively and is able to hit a jumper up to 17 feet", adding that he also was "an excellent position defender". Later Bembry noted that he was a power forward who was able to play center, adding that at Michigan he was "most effective playing with his back to the basket" but could also pass effectively and hit medium-range jumpers. The Bullets' head coach, Jim Lynam, described Howard as a "complete player" and noted, "[H]e can defend you and he can score over you". Nash said that "the things that impressed me most about him were his character, his intelligence and his insight. He's a leader type."

When he first became a free agent in 1996, Howard was described as versatile enough to play all three front-line positions (small forward, power forward and center), and Michael Jordan praised his "game, work ethic and character". As a Dallas player in 2000–01, he was still regarded as a versatile offensive player who could "take advantage of smaller defenders in the paint and then stretch his bigger defenders outside" in addition to being a solid rebounder. By 2001, Lacy J. Banks from the Chicago Sun-Times regarded him as a high-priced, under-achieving player, but in 2002, Banks described him as a solid veteran at the four (power forward position). In the NBA, Howard developed a respected inside post-up game and a reputation as a veteran leader, according to Kiki Vandeweghe, the general manager of the Denver Nuggets, Howard's team in 2003.

When he signed with the Heat in 2010, Howard was lauded for his ability to play the power forward and center positions and for his professionalism. Howard also added frontcourt toughness. As an elder statesman with the Heat, he was regarded as a future NBA coach or general manager.

== Coaching career ==
=== Miami Heat (2013–2019) ===
On September 28, 2013, the Heat announced a reshuffling of their organization. The reshuffling included the announcement that Howard would remain with the Heat, moving officially into an assistant coaching role. The assistant coaching position was available after both Chad Kammerer and Keith Askins were moved from coaching to scouting positions. This effectively indicated Howard's retirement as a basketball player, as league regulations prohibit one from holding a coaching position while being an active player. Howard spent six seasons with the Heat as an assistant coach. In his first year, the Heat reached the 2014 NBA Finals in the final year of the LeBron James, Dwyane Wade, and Chris Bosh trio, where they lost to the Spurs in 5 games. The Heat went on to make two more playoff appearances in Howard's remaining time as an assistant coach in Miami.

Howard coached a number of All-Stars while with the Heat, including LeBron James, Dwyane Wade, Chris Bosh, Ray Allen, Jimmy Butler and Bam Adebayo.

=== Michigan (2019–2024) ===
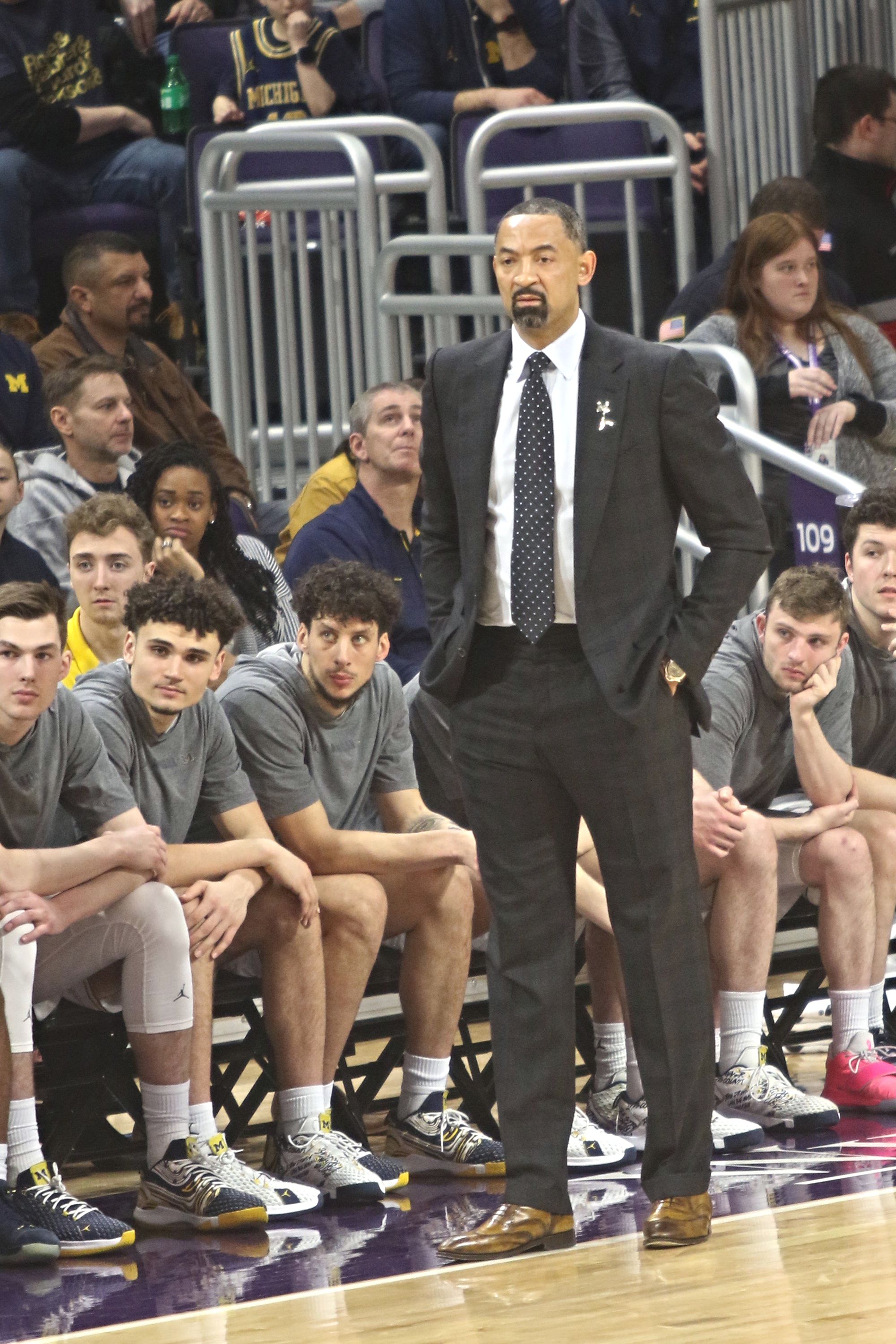
Howard standing on the sideline for Michigan at Welsh–Ryan Arena in February 2020

On May 22, 2019, Howard was named the head coach of the Michigan Wolverines men's basketball team, signing a five-year contract. In his first season, he led the 2019–20 Wolverines to a 19–12 record before the Big Ten tournament and NCAA tournament were cancelled due to COVID-19. In his second season, he guided the 2020–21 Wolverines to a 14–3 conference record and their first Big Ten regular season title in seven years. Howard was named the Big Ten Conference Coach of the Year, Sporting News Coach of the Year, AP Coach of the Year, and the USBWA Coach of the Year. Michigan was named a No. 1 seed in the 2021 NCAA tournament, making Howard the first person in NCAA history to enter the tournament as a No. 1 seed as both a player and a coach. On November 16, 2021, Michigan signed Howard to a five-year contract extension through the 2025–26 season.

On February 20, 2022, an altercation involving Howard took place following a game against the Wisconsin Badgers at the Kohl Center, where Howard hit Wisconsin's assistant coach in the face after he grabbed his arm. The following day, Howard was suspended for the remainder of the regular season and fined $40,000 for being in violation of the Big Ten Conference's Sportsmanship Policy. Howard was allowed to return for the Big Ten Tournament and later the NCAA tournament, where the 2021–22 Wolverines reached the Sweet Sixteen for a fifth consecutive tournament; second under Howard. The following season, Michigan finished 18–16 and missed the NCAA tournament, losing in the second round of the NIT. On March 15, 2024, following an 8–24 season and another successive season without an NCAA tournament appearance, Michigan announced they were parting ways with Howard after five years. During Howard's tenure, Michigan had five NCAA tournament wins (in four seasons with an NCAA tournament) and an 87–72 overall record.

=== Brooklyn Nets (2024–present) ===
On April 26, 2024, Howard joined the Brooklyn Nets as an assistant coach for Jordi Fernández.

== Personal life ==
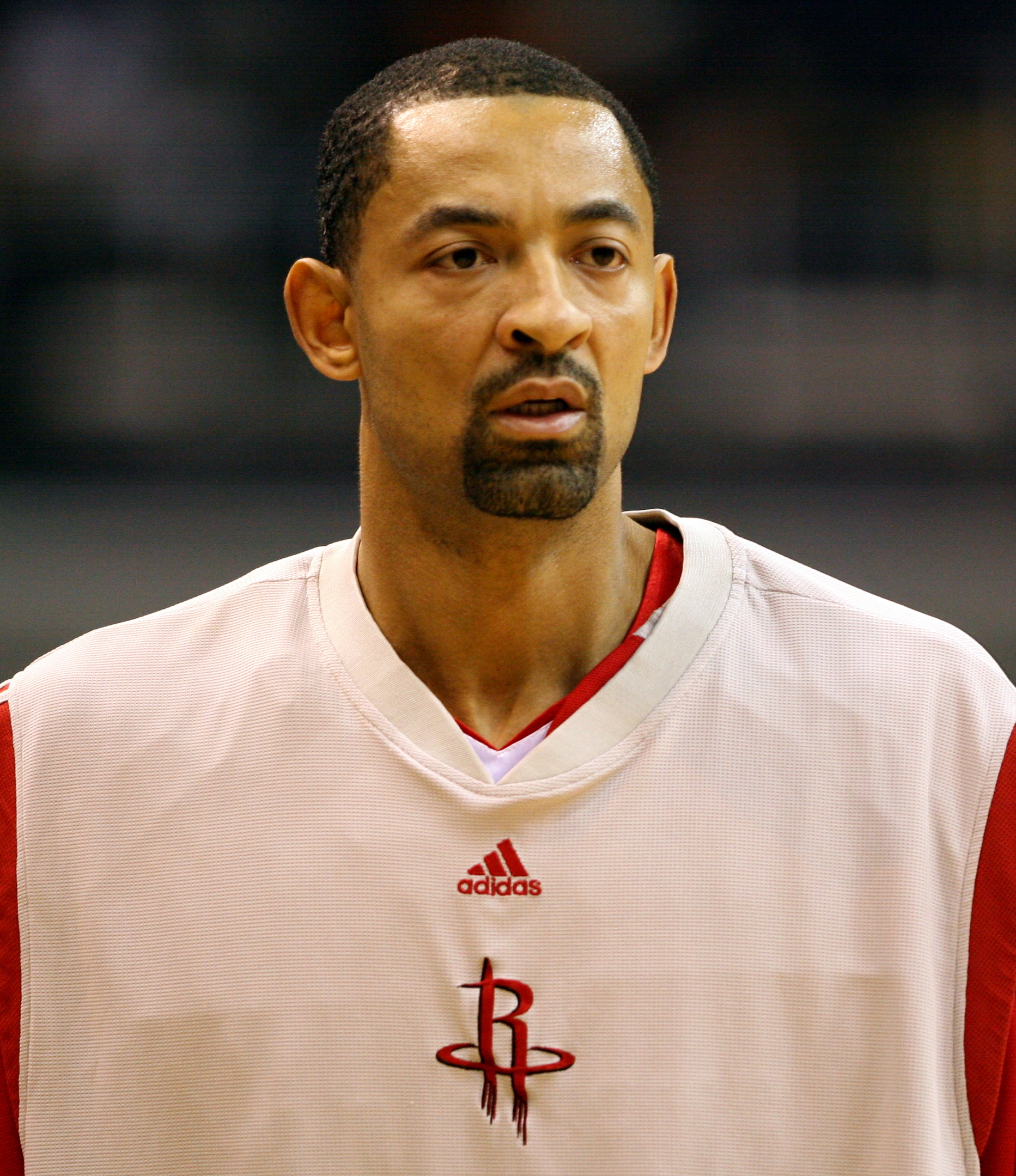
Howard in 2006

Howard has six children. One of Howard's children, son Juwan Howard Jr. (born February 5, 1992), is the child of Markita Blyden, who was runner-up for Michigan's Miss Basketball when she and her twin sister led Detroit's Murray–Wright High School to the 1990 Class A state championship game. Howard Jr. finished his senior season at Detroit's Pershing High School in spring 2010. As a junior, he led his high school to the Michigan High School Athletic Association state championship. As a senior, he was named first team All-State by the Associated Press and Detroit Free Press. He played his freshman season for the 2010–11 Western Michigan Broncos before he transferred to the University of Detroit Mercy Titans. As a redshirt sophomore for the 2012–13 Detroit Titans, he became a regular starter and solid contributor.

On July 6, 2002, Howard married Jenine Wardally. They have two sons: Jace, who was born in late September 2001, and Jett, who is two years younger. Jace formerly played under his father at the University of Michigan and currently plays for the Fordham Rams. Jett played alongside his brother at Michigan until being drafted to the Orlando Magic at pick #11 in 2023. After spending three seasons with the Magic, Jett was then signed by the Dallas Mavericks.

Howard is cousins with Angela Jackson, mother of NBA athletes Jalen McDaniels and Jaden McDaniels, making him first cousins once removed with them and his children second cousins with them.

=== Philanthropy ===
As a student athlete at the University of Michigan, Howard volunteered to visit patients at the University of Michigan Health System Hospitals in Ann Arbor, Michigan. He continued to engage in charity work and hospital visits throughout his career, including a Stay in School Jam for 6,500 local area students that he participated in along with several teammates and R&B artist Usher.

Howard was recognized in 2001 as one of the "Good Guys in Sports" by The Sporting News for his civic contributions. In 2010, Howard won the NBA Cares Community Assist Award for his community efforts, philanthropic work and charitable contributions. He runs a yearly free basketball camp for youth, which is made possible by a partnership between the Juwan Howard Foundation and the Chicago Public Schools (CPS), Jordan Brand, Dell Computers, EMI Music, Vitamin Water and the NBA. His foundation partners with the CPS for a reading challenge; the top 300 readers, out of 30,000 annually, attend his camp. During and after his time as a member of the Heat, Howard was active in South Florida community outreach, fundraising and humanitarian efforts.

== Film and television appearances ==
Howard appeared in the 1994 basketball film Hoop Dreams. He had a small role in the television drama The West Wing, appearing in a 1999 episode as Rodney Grant, a former Duke basketball player who served on Josiah Bartlet's Council on Physical Fitness and helped him win a game against his staff.

Other appearances include the August 15, 1999 "The Art of Give and Take" episode of Arli$$, the season 5 (2005) "Michigan's Fab 5" episode of Beyond the Glory, the November 9, 1996, season 2 "Son-in-Law" episode of Hang Time and the 2011 documentary The Fab Five, produced by his Michigan teammate Jalen Rose. After his 18th season in the NBA, Howard worked with Rick Ross to produce a rap song entitled "It's Time to Ball" from an album Howard was working on, entitled Full Court Press Volume 1.

Howard most recently made a brief TV appearance in the pickup basketball game scene in episode 8 of The Last Dance, a documentary about the 1997–98 Chicago Bulls' championship season.

== Career statistics ==
Legend
GP	Games played	GS	Games started	MPG	Minutes per game
FG%	Field goal percentage	3P%	3-point field goal percentage	FT%	Free throw percentage
RPG	Rebounds per game	APG	Assists per game	SPG	Steals per game
BPG	Blocks per game	PPG	Points per game	**Bold**	Career high
†	Won an NBA championship	*	Led the league

=== NBA ===
==== Regular season ====
Year	Team	GP	GS	MPG	FG%	3P%	FT%	RPG	APG	SPG	BPG	PPG
1994–95	Washington	65	52	36.1	.489	.000	.664	**8.4**	2.5	.8	.2	17.0
1995–96	Washington	81	81	**40.7**	.489	.308	.749	8.1	**4.4**	.8	.5	**22.1**
1996–97	Washington	**82**	**82***	40.5	.486	.000	.756	8.0	3.8	1.1	.3	19.1
1997–98	Washington	64	64	40.0	.467	.000	.721	7.0	3.3	**1.3**	.4	18.5
1998–99	Washington	36	36	39.7	.474	.000	.753	8.1	3.0	1.2	.4	18.9
1999–00	Washington	**82**	**82***	35.5	.459	.000	.735	5.7	3.0	.8	.3	14.9
2000–01	Washington	54	54	36.7	.474	.000	.770	7.0	2.9	.9	.4	18.2
2000–01	Dallas	27	27	36.8	.488	.000	.780	7.1	2.6	1.1	**.6**	17.8
2001–02	Dallas	53	44	31.3	.462	.000	.754	7.4	1.8	.5	**.6**	12.9
2001–02	Denver	28	28	34.9	.457	.000	.770	7.9	2.7	.6	**.6**	17.9
2002–03	Denver	77	77	35.5	.450	**.500**	.803	7.6	3.0	1.0	.4	18.4
2003–04	Orlando	81	77	35.5	.453	.000	.809	7.0	2.0	.7	.3	17.0
2004–05	Houston	61	47	26.6	.451	.000	.843	5.7	1.5	.5	.1	9.6
2005–06	Houston	80	80	31.7	.459	.000	.806	6.7	1.4	.6	.1	11.8
2006–07	Houston	80	38	26.5	.465	.000	.824	5.9	1.6	.4	.1	9.7
2007–08	Dallas	50	0	7.1	.359	.000	.786	1.6	.3	.1	.0	1.1
2008–09	Denver	3	0	7.3	.500	.000	.000	1.3	.7	.3	.3	.7
2008–09	Charlotte	39	2	11.5	.510	.000	.676	1.8	.6	.2	.1	4.4
2009–10	Portland	73	27	22.4	.509	.000	.786	4.6	.8	.4	.1	6.0
2010–11	Miami	57	0	10.4	.440	.000	.829	2.1	.4	.2	.1	2.4
2011–12†	Miami	28	0	6.8	.309	.000	.800	1.6	.4	.1	.0	1.5
2012–13†	Miami	7	2	7.3	**.526**	.000	**1.000**	1.1	.9	.0	.0	3.0
Career		1208	900	30.3	.469	.120	.764	6.1	2.2	.7	.3	13.4
All-Star		1	0	16.0	.200	.000	.000	6.0	2.0	1.0	.0	2.0

==== Playoffs ====
Year	Team	GP	GS	MPG	FG%	3P%	FT%	RPG	APG	SPG	BPG	PPG
1997	Washington	3	3	**43.0**	.465	.000	**.889**	6.0	**1.7**	**.7**	**.7**	**18.7**
2001	Dallas	10	**10**	39.1	.360	.000	.800	**8.3**	1.4	.6	.5	13.4
2007	Houston	7	0	22.4	.400	.000	.636	4.4	1.0	**.7**	.0	5.0
2008	Dallas	3	0	3.7	.000	.000	.250	.0	.3	.0	.0	.3
2010	Portland	6	0	14.5	**.526**	.000	.000	2.7	.7	.2	.2	3.3
2011	Miami	**11**	0	5.5	.444	.000	.692	.9	.1	.0	.0	1.5
2012†	Miami	9	0	2.7	.286	.000	.750	.1	.0	.0	.0	.8
Career		49	13	17.5	.394	.000	.758	3.2	.7	.3	.2	5.5

=== College ===
Year	Team	GP	GS	MPG	FG%	3P%	FT%	RPG	APG	SPG	BPG	PPG
1991–92	Michigan	34	31	28.1	.450	.000	.688	6.2	1.8	0.4	0.6	11.1
1992–93	Michigan	**36**	**36**	31.5	.506	.000	**.700**	7.4	1.9	0.6	0.4	14.6
1993–94	Michigan	30	30	**34.9**	**.556**	**.143**	.675	**9.0**	**2.4**	**1.5**	**0.7**	**20.8**
Career		100	97	31.4	.510	.091	.688	7.5	2.0	0.8	0.6	15.3

== Head coaching record ==
Record table
Season	Team	Overall	Conference	Standing	Postseason
Michigan Wolverines (Big Ten Conference) (2019–2024)
2019–20	Michigan	19–12	10–10	9th	Postseason cancelled due to COVID-19
2020–21	Michigan	23–5	14–3	1st	NCAA Division I Elite Eight
2021–22	Michigan	19–15 (Note: Howard was suspended for the final five regular season games of the 2021–22 season. Associate head coach Phil Martelli served as acting head coach in his absence.)	11–9	T–7th	NCAA Division I Sweet 16
2022–23	Michigan	18–16	11–9	T–5th	NIT Second Round
2023–24	Michigan	8–24	3–17	14th	
Michigan:		87–72 (.547)	49–48 (.505)		
Total:		87–72 (.547)			
National champion Postseason invitational champion Conference regular season champion Conference regular season and conference tournament champion Division regular season champion Division regular season and conference tournament champion Conference tournament champion

== See also ==
- List of NBA career games played leaders
- List of NBA career personal fouls leaders
- List of NBA seasons played leaders
- List of oldest and youngest NBA players
