= Clifford Rozier =

American basketball player (1972–2018)

Personal information
- Born: October 31, 1972 Bradenton, Florida, U.S.
- Died: July 6, 2018 (aged 45) Bradenton, Florida, U.S.
- Listed height: 6 ft 11 in (2.11 m)
- Listed weight: 245 lb (111 kg)

Career information
- High school: Southeast (Bradenton, Florida)
- College: North Carolina (1990–1991); Louisville (1992–1994)
- NBA draft: 1994: 1st round, 16th overall pick
- Drafted by: Golden State Warriors
- Playing career: 1994–2000
- Position: Power forward / center
- Number: 44, 7, 22

Career history
- 1994–1996: Golden State Warriors
- 1997: Pamesa Valencia
- 1997: Toronto Raptors
- 1997: Minnesota Timberwolves
- 1997–1998: Quad City Thunder

Career highlights
- CBA champion (1998); Consensus first-team All-American (1994); 2× Metro Conference Player of the Year (1993, 1994); 2× First-team All-Metro Conference (1993, 1994); McDonald's All-American (1990); First-team Parade All-American (1990); Florida Mr. Basketball (1990)

Career NBA statistics
- Points: 827 (4.8 ppg)
- Rebounds: 897 (5.2 rpg)
- FG%: .496
- Stats at NBA.com
- Stats at Basketball Reference

Clifford Glen Rozier (October 31, 1972 - July 6, 2018) was an American professional basketball player for four seasons in the National Basketball Association (NBA). He played college basketball for the Louisville Cardinals, earning consensus first-team All-American honors in 1994.

Rozier was named Florida Mr. Basketball. He played college basketball at the University of North Carolina and the University of Louisville. As a senior at Louisville, Rozier averaged 18.1 points and 11.1 rebounds a game. He was selected by the Golden State Warriors in the first round (16th pick overall) of the 1994 NBA draft. Rozier played for the Warriors, Toronto Raptors and Minnesota Timberwolves in his four NBA seasons. His best season as a pro came during his rookie year with the Warriors, when he appeared in 66 games averaging 6.8 points per game. Over the course of his career, he played in 173 NBA games.

Rozier won a Continental Basketball Association (CBA) championship with the Quad City Thunder in 1998.

In 2000, he played in the United States Basketball League with the Brevard Blue Ducks.

Rozier died at age 45 following a heart attack on July 6, 2018.
