= 1994 NCAA Men's Basketball All-Americans =

- Awarded for: 1993–94 NCAA Division I men's basketball season

The Consensus 1994 College Basketball All-American team, as determined by aggregating the results of four major All-American teams. To earn "consensus" status, a player must win honors from a majority of the following teams: the Associated Press, the USBWA, The United Press International and the National Association of Basketball Coaches.

== 1994 Consensus All-America team ==
Consensus First Team
Player	Position	Class	Team
Grant Hill	F	Senior	Duke
Jason Kidd	G	Sophomore	California
Donyell Marshall	F	Junior	Connecticut
Glenn Robinson	F	Junior	Purdue
Clifford Rozier	F/C	Junior	Louisville

Consensus Second Team
Player	Position	Class	Team
Melvin Booker	G	Senior	Missouri
Eric Montross	C	Senior	North Carolina
Lamond Murray	F	Junior	California
Khalid Reeves	G	Senior	Arizona
Jalen Rose	G	Junior	Michigan
Corliss Williamson	F	Sophomore	Arkansas

== Individual All-America teams ==
All-America Team
All-America Team	First team		Second team		Third team	
All-America Team	Player	School	Player	School	Player	School
Associated Press	Grant Hill	Duke	Melvin Booker	Missouri	Damon Bailey	Indiana
Associated Press	Jason Kidd	California	Eric Montross	North Carolina	Juwan Howard	Michigan
Associated Press	Donyell Marshall	Connecticut	Khalid Reeves	Arizona	Lamond Murray	California
Associated Press	Glenn Robinson	Purdue	Jalen Rose	Michigan	Bryant Reeves	Oklahoma State
Associated Press	Clifford Rozier	Louisville	Corliss Williamson	Arkansas	B. J. Tyler	Texas
USBWA	Grant Hill	Duke	Melvin Booker	Missouri	No third team	
USBWA	Jason Kidd	California	Lamond Murray	California	No third team	
USBWA	Donyell Marshall	Connecticut	Khalid Reeves	Arizona	No third team	
USBWA	Glenn Robinson	Purdue	Jalen Rose	Michigan	No third team	
USBWA	Clifford Rozier	Louisville	Corliss Williamson	Arkansas	No third team	
NABC	Grant Hill	Duke	Damon Bailey	Indiana	Bill Curley	Boston College
NABC	Jason Kidd	California	Juwan Howard	Michigan	Lamond Murray	California
NABC	Donyell Marshall	Connecticut	Jalen Rose	Michigan	Ed O'Bannon	UCLA
NABC	Eric Montross	North Carolina	Clifford Rozier	Louisville	Khalid Reeves	Arizona
NABC	Glenn Robinson	Purdue	Corliss Williamson	Arkansas	Lou Roe	Massachusetts
UPI	Grant Hill	Duke	Melvin Booker	Missouri	Lamond Murray	California
UPI	Jason Kidd	California	Bryant Reeves	Oklahoma State	Shawn Respert	Michigan State
UPI	Donyell Marshall	Connecticut	Khalid Reeves	Arizona	Carlos Rogers	Tennessee State
UPI	Glenn Robinson	Purdue	Jalen Rose	Michigan	Joe Smith	Maryland
UPI	Clifford Rozier	Louisville	Corliss Williamson	Arkansas	B. J. Tyler	Texas

AP Honorable Mention

- Adrian Autry, Syracuse
- Randolph Childress, Wake Forest
- Erwin Claggett, Saint Louis
- Dan Cross, Florida
- Jevon Crudup, Missouri
- Bill Curley, Boston College
- Michael Finley, Wisconsin
- Travis Ford, Kentucky
- James Forrest, Georgia Tech
- Eddie Jones, Temple
- Voshon Lenard, Minnesota
- Billy McCaffrey, Vanderbilt
- Jim McIlvaine, Marquette
- Aaron McKie, Temple
- Lawrence Moten, Syracuse
- Ed O'Bannon, UCLA
- Cherokee Parks, Duke
- Wesley Person, Auburn
- Derrick Phelps, North Carolina
- Eric Piatkowski, Nebraska
- Shawn Respert, Michigan State
- Lou Roe, Massachusetts
- Carlos Rogers, Tennessee State
- Jervaughn Scales, Southern
- Joe Smith, Maryland
- Michael Smith, Providence
- Damon Stoudamire, Arizona
- Bob Sura, Florida State
- Deon Thomas, Illinois
- Scotty Thurman, Arkansas
- Gary Trent, Ohio
- Monty Williams, Notre Dame
- Sharone Wright, Clemson
