= Khalid Reeves =

American basketball player (born 1972)

Personal information
- Born: July 15, 1972 (age 54) Queens, New York, U.S.
- Listed height: 6 ft 3 in (1.91 m)
- Listed weight: 199 lb (90 kg)

Career information
- High school: Christ the King (Queens, New York)
- College: Arizona (1990–1994)
- NBA draft: 1994: 1st round, 12th overall pick
- Drafted by: Miami Heat
- Playing career: 1994–2005
- Position: Point guard
- Number: 1, 3, 6, 20

Career history
- 1994–1995: Miami Heat
- 1995–1996: Charlotte Hornets
- 1996–1997: New Jersey Nets
- 1997–1999: Dallas Mavericks
- 1999: Detroit Pistons
- 1999: Aris
- 1999: Pau-Orthez
- 1999–2000: Chicago Bulls
- 2000–2001: Grand Rapids Hoops
- 2001–2002: Phoenix Eclipse
- 2002: Florida Sea Dragons
- 2003–2004: Café Najjar
- 2004–2005: Panteras de Miranda
- 2007: Saprissa Basket

Career highlights
- Greek League All-Star (1999); Consensus second-team All-American (1994); First-team All-Pac-10 (1994); McDonald's All-American Co-MVP (1990); Second-team Parade All-American (1990)

Career NBA statistics
- Points: 2,167 (7.8 ppg)
- Rebounds: 580 (2.1 rpg)
- Assists: 886 (3.2 apg)
- Stats at NBA.com
- Stats at Basketball Reference
Medals
Men's basketball
Representing United States
FIBA U19 World Championship
Gold medal – first place	1991 Edmonton	Team competition

Khalid Reeves (born July 15, 1972) is an American former professional basketball player who played six seasons in the National Basketball Association (NBA). He was selected by the Miami Heat in the first round (12th pick) of the 1994 NBA draft.

Reeves attended Christ The King Regional High School in Middle Village, Queens, New York, and played college basketball for the Arizona Wildcats.

== College career ==
Reeves found his way to UA when he told his high school coach he wanted to play in a warm climate. His coach, Bob Oliva, reached out to then-UA coach Lute Olson and his staff. Reeves went on to be one of the most prolific scorers in UA history, still owning the season scoring record of 848 points achieved in 1993-94 a 2010 report remembered. He led the Wildcats to the 1994 NCAA Final Four with backcourt teammate Damon Stoudamire. The Wildcats lost to eventual champion Arkansas.

== Professional career ==
Reeves played for numerous NBA teams from 1994 to 2000, averaging 7.8 points per game for his career. The last NBA team Reeves played for was the Post-Michael Jordan Chicago Bulls during the 1999–2000 season (the 2nd of 3 consecutive seasons where the Bulls won less than 20 games in a season).

Reeves' final NBA game, on January 3, 2000, was a 63 - 88 loss to the Portland Trail Blazers where he recorded 3 points and 1 assist.

After Reeves' NBA career ended, he continued to play professionally for smaller US-based leagues and in Greece, France, Lebanon, and Venezuela before retiring as a professional player in 2005.

== NBA career statistics ==
Legend
GP	Games played	GS	Games started	MPG	Minutes per game
FG%	Field goal percentage	3P%	3-point field goal percentage	FT%	Free throw percentage
RPG	Rebounds per game	APG	Assists per game	SPG	Steals per game
BPG	Blocks per game	PPG	Points per game	**Bold**	Career high
*	Led the league

=== Regular season ===
Year	Team	GP	GS	MPG	FG%	3P%	FT%	RPG	APG	SPG	BPG	PPG
1994–95	Miami	67	17	21.8	.443	.392	.714	**2.8**	**4.3**	**1.1**	.1	**9.2**
1995–96	Charlotte	20	5	20.9	**.458**	.306	.843	2.0	3.6	.8	.1	8.1
1995–96	New Jersey	31	7	13.4	.376	.309	.581	1.3	1.5	.7	.1	3.8
1996–97	New Jersey	50	18	21.0	.393	**.396**	.747	1.8	3.4	.5	.1	8.3
1996–97	Dallas	13	12	**29.6**	.387	.200	.750	2.4	**4.3**	.8	**.2**	7.8
1997–98	Dallas	**82***	**54**	23.8	.418	.368	.775	2.3	2.8	1.0	.1	8.7
1998–99	Detroit	11	0	10.2	.381	.333	.571	.6	1.0	.4	.0	2.3
1999–00	Chicago	3	0	16.0	.250	.000	**1.000**	1.3	**4.3**	.7	.0	3.7
Career		277	113	21.1	.416	.363	.744	2.1	3.2	.8	.1	7.8

== Coaching career ==
Reeves is currently an assistant coach at his high school alma mater, Christ the King Regional High School.
