= 1994 NBA draft =

Basketball player selection

General information
- Sport: Basketball
- Date: June 29, 1994
- Location: Hoosier Dome (Indianapolis, Indiana)
- Network: TNT

Overview
- 54 total selections in 2 rounds
- League: NBA
- First selection: Glenn Robinson, Milwaukee Bucks
- Hall of Famers: 2: PG Jason Kidd; SF Grant Hill

The 1994 NBA draft took place on June 29, 1994, at Hoosier Dome in Indianapolis. Two NBA rookies of the year were picked in the first round, as Jason Kidd and Grant Hill were co-winners of the award for the 1994–95 NBA season. Kidd and Hill would end up as perennial All-Stars (10 and 7-time selections, respectively), though Hill's career was marred by severe injuries.

The first overall pick Glenn Robinson was involved in a contract holdout shortly after being selected, reportedly seeking a 13-year, $100 million contract. Both Robinson and the Milwaukee Bucks eventually agreed on a 10-year, $68 million contract, which once stood as the richest contract ever signed by a rookie in professional sports. A fixed salary cap for rookies was implemented by the NBA the following season. Robinson himself had a productive NBA career, becoming a two-time NBA All-Star and winning an NBA Championship in 2005 in his final year with the San Antonio Spurs.

This is the final draft to date to see all of the first three picks make All-Star rosters with the teams that originally drafted them.

== Draft selections ==
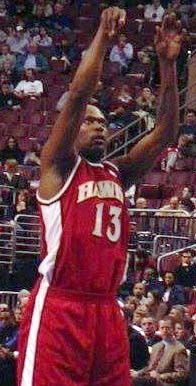
Glenn Robinson, the 1st pick of the Milwaukee Bucks

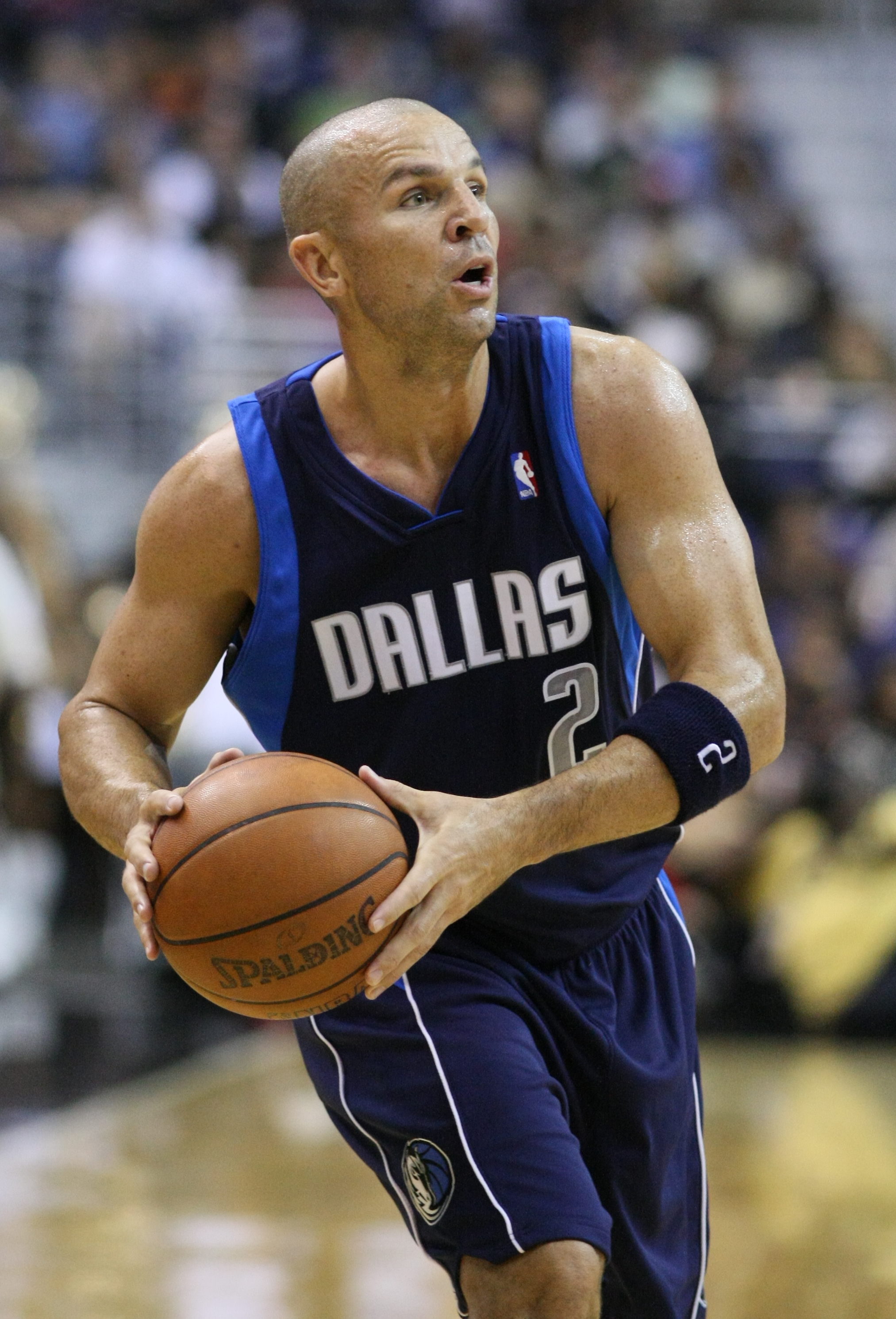
Jason Kidd, the 2nd pick of the Dallas Mavericks

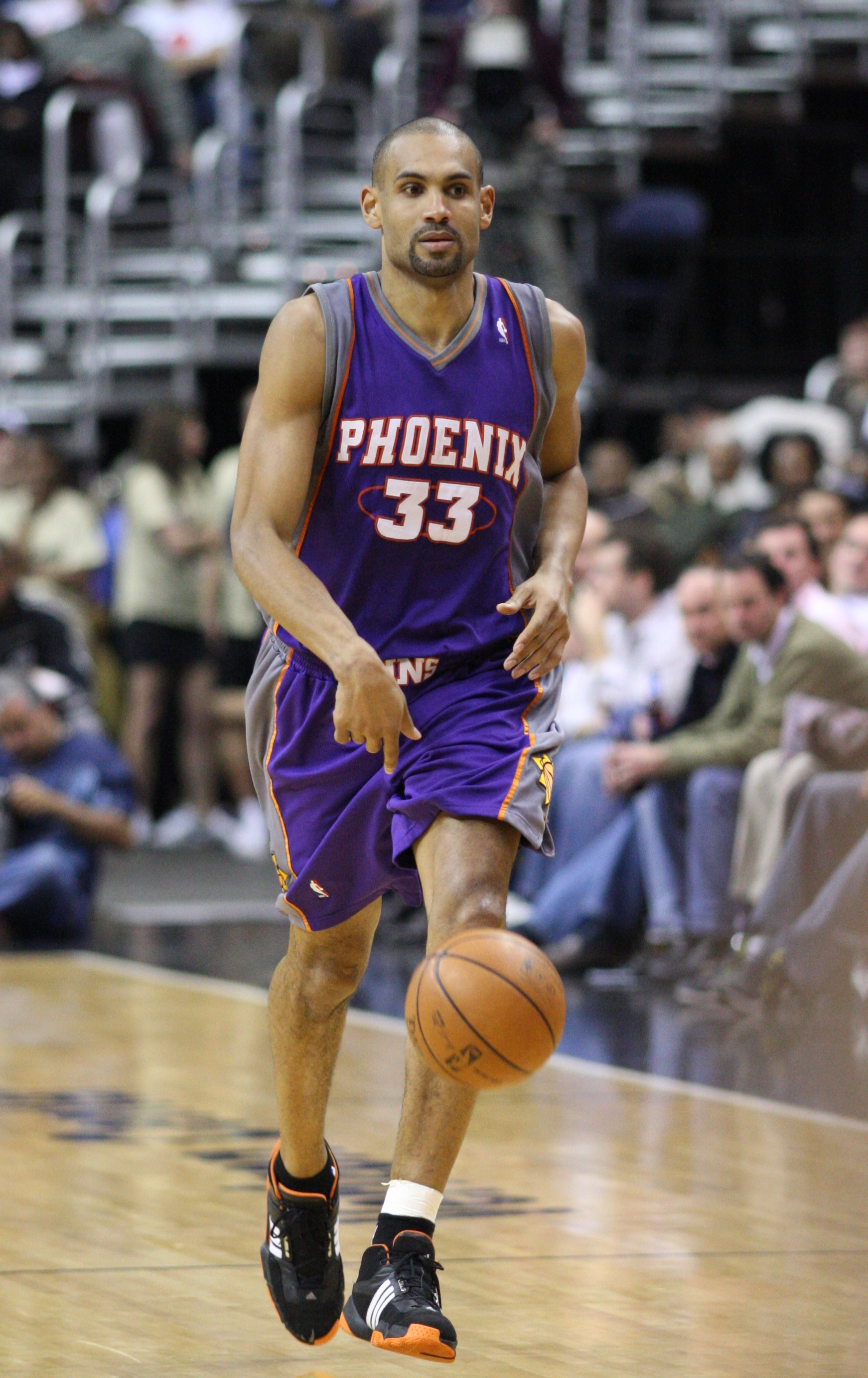
Grant Hill, the 3rd pick of the Detroit Pistons

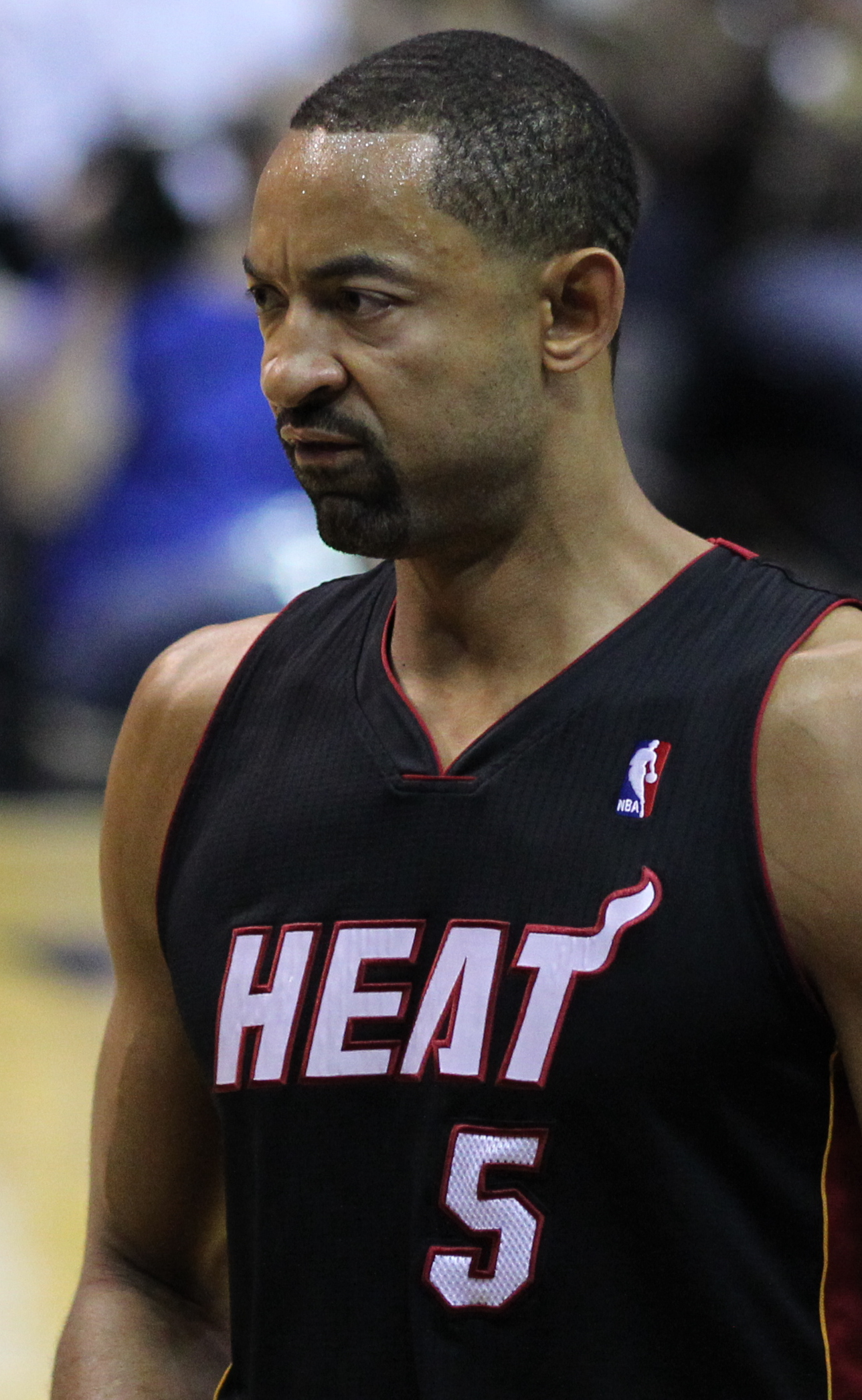
Juwan Howard, the 5th pick of the Washington Bullets

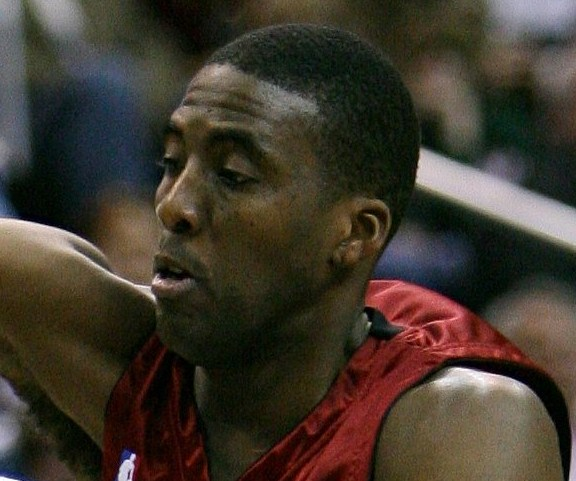
Eddie Jones, the 10th pick of the Los Angeles Lakers

PG	Point guard	SG	Shooting guard	SF	Small forward	PF	Power forward	C	Center

^	Denotes player who has been inducted to the Naismith Memorial Basketball Hall of Fame
*	Denotes player who has been selected for at least one All-Star Game and All-NBA Team
^{+}	Denotes player who has been selected for at least one All-Star Game
^{x}	Denotes player who has been selected for at least one All-NBA Team
^{#}	Denotes player who has never appeared in an NBA regular-season or playoff game
^{~}	Denotes player who has been selected as Rookie of the Year

Round	Pick	Player	Pos.	Nationality (Note: Nationality indicates the player's national team or representative nationality. If a player has not competed at the international level, then the nationality indicates the national team which the player is eligible to represent according to FIBA rules.)	Team	School / club team
1	1	Glenn Robinson^{+}	SF	United States	Milwaukee Bucks	Purdue (Jr.)
1	2	Jason Kidd^~	PG	United States	Dallas Mavericks	California (So.)
1	3	Grant Hill^~	SF	United States	Detroit Pistons	Duke (Sr.)
1	4	Donyell Marshall	SF	United States	Minnesota Timberwolves	Connecticut (Jr.)
1	5	Juwan Howard*	PF	United States	Washington Bullets	Michigan (Jr.)
1	6	Sharone Wright	PF/C	United States	Philadelphia 76ers	Clemson (Jr.)
1	7	Lamond Murray	SF	United States	Los Angeles Clippers	California (Jr.)
1	8	Brian Grant	PF	United States	Sacramento Kings	Xavier (Sr.)
1	9	Eric Montross	C	United States	Boston Celtics	North Carolina (Sr.)
1	10	Eddie Jones*	SG	United States	Los Angeles Lakers	Temple (Sr.)
1	11	Carlos Rogers	SF	United States	Seattle SuperSonics (from Charlotte, traded to Golden State)	Tennessee State (Sr.)
1	12	Khalid Reeves	PG	United States	Miami Heat	Arizona (Sr.)
1	13	Jalen Rose	G/F	United States	Denver Nuggets	Michigan (Jr.)
1	14	Yinka Dare	C	Nigeria	New Jersey Nets	George Washington (So.)
1	15	Eric Piatkowski	SG	United States	Indiana Pacers	Nebraska (Sr.)
1	16	Clifford Rozier	PF	United States	Golden State Warriors (from Cleveland)	Louisville (Jr.)
1	17	Aaron McKie	SG	United States	Portland Trail Blazers	Temple (Sr.)
1	18	Eric Mobley	PF	United States	Milwaukee Bucks (from Orlando)	Pittsburgh (Sr.)
1	19	Tony Dumas	SG	United States	Dallas Mavericks (from Golden State)	UMKC (Sr.)
1	20	B.J. Tyler	PG	United States	Philadelphia 76ers (from Utah)	Texas (Sr.)
1	21	Dickey Simpkins	PF	United States	Chicago Bulls	Providence (Sr.)
1	22	Bill Curley	PF	United States	San Antonio Spurs	Boston College (Sr.)
1	23	Wesley Person	SG	United States	Phoenix Suns	Auburn (Sr.)
1	24	Monty Williams	SF	United States	New York Knicks	Notre Dame (Sr.)
1	25	Greg Minor	SG	United States	Los Angeles Clippers (from Atlanta)	Louisville (Sr.)
1	26	Charlie Ward	PG	United States	New York Knicks (from Houston via Atlanta)	Florida State (Sr.)
1	27	Brooks Thompson	PG	United States	Orlando Magic (from Seattle via L.A. Clippers)	Oklahoma State (Sr.)
2	28	Deon Thomas^{#}	F/C	United States	Dallas Mavericks	Illinois (Sr.)
2	29	Antonio Lang	F/G	United States	Phoenix Suns	Duke (Sr.)
2	30	Howard Eisley	PG	United States	Minnesota Timberwolves	Boston College (Sr.)
2	31	Rodney Dent^{#}	F/C	United States	Orlando Magic	Kentucky (Sr.)
2	32	Jim McIlvaine	C	United States	Washington Bullets	Marquette (Sr.)
2	33	Derrick Alston	F	United States	Philadelphia 76ers	Duquesne (Sr.)
2	34	Gaylon Nickerson	G	United States	Atlanta Hawks (from L.A. Clippers)	Northwestern Oklahoma State (Sr.)
2	35	Michael Smith	F	United States	Sacramento Kings	Providence (Sr.)
2	36	Andrei Fetisov^{#}	F	Russia	Boston Celtics	Forum Valladolid (Spain)
2	37	Dontonio Wingfield	F	United States	Seattle SuperSonics (from L.A. Lakers)	Cincinnati (Fr.)
2	38	Darrin Hancock	G/F	United States	Charlotte Hornets	Maurienne (France)
2	39	Anthony Miller	F	United States	Golden State Warriors (from Denver)	Michigan State (Sr.)
2	40	Jeff Webster	F	United States	Miami Heat	Oklahoma (Sr.)
2	41	William Njoku^{#}	PF	Canada	Indiana Pacers	St. Mary's (Canada) (Sr.)
2	42	Gary Collier^{#}	SF	United States	Cleveland Cavaliers	Tulsa (Sr.)
2	43	Shawnelle Scott	C	United States	Portland Trail Blazers	St. John's (Sr.)
2	44	Damon Bailey^{#}	G	United States	Indiana Pacers	Indiana (Sr.)
2	45	Dwayne Morton	F	United States	Golden State Warriors	Louisville (Sr.)
2	46	Voshon Lenard	SG	United States	Milwaukee Bucks (from Orlando)	Minnesota (Jr.)
2	47	Jamie Watson	F	United States	Utah Jazz	South Carolina (Sr.)
2	48	Jevon Crudup^{#}	F/C	United States	Detroit Pistons	Missouri (Sr.)
2	49	Kris Bruton^{#}	SF	United States	Chicago Bulls	Benedict (Sr.)
2	50	Charles Claxton	C	United States Virgin Islands	Phoenix Suns	Georgia (Jr.)
2	51	Lawrence Funderburke	PF	United States	Sacramento Kings (from Atlanta)	Ohio State (Sr.)
2	52	Anthony Goldwire	PG	United States	Phoenix Suns (from New York)	Houston (Sr.)
2	53	Albert Burditt^{#}	PF	United States	Houston Rockets	Texas (Sr.)
2	54	Željko Rebrača	C	FR Yugoslavia	Seattle SuperSonics	KK Partizan (Yugoslavia)

== Notable undrafted players ==
These players went undrafted in 1994 but played in the NBA.

Player	Pos.	Nationality	School/club team
Melvin Booker	PG	United States	Missouri (Sr.)
Lazaro Borrell	SF	Cuba	Lobos de Villa Clara (Cuba)
Jimmy Carruth	PF	United States	Virginia Tech (Sr.)
Robert Churchwell	SG	United States	Georgetown (Sr.)
Thomas Hamilton	C	United States	King College Prep (Chicago, Illinois)
Askia Jones	SG	United States	Kansas State (Sr.)
Ryan Lorthridge	SG	United States	Jackson State (Sr.)
Ivano Newbill	F	United States	Georgia Tech (Sr.)
Derrick Phelps	PG	United States	North Carolina (Sr.)
Trevor Ruffin	PG	United States	Hawaii (Sr.)
Kevin Salvadori	C	United States	North Carolina (Sr.)
Stevin Smith	SG	United States	Arizona State (Sr.)
Aaron Swinson	SF	United States	Auburn (Sr.)
Logan Vander Velden	SF	United States	Green Bay (Sr.)
Fred Vinson	SG	United States	Georgia Tech (Sr.)

== Early entrants ==
=== College underclassmen ===
For the twelfth year in a row and the sixteenth time in seventeen years, no college underclassman would withdraw their entry into the NBA draft. However, it would be the eighth time in nine years that players that left college early to play professionally overseas would declare entry into the NBA draft as an underclassman of sorts, with the University of Kansas' Darrin Hancock playing for the Aix Maurienne Savoie Basket in France and the University of Alabama's Cedric Moore playing for the GSSV Donar out in The Netherlands. With their inclusions, the official number of underclassmen would increase from eighteen to twenty total players. Regardless, the following college basketball players successfully applied for early draft entrance.

- (United States) Maurice Barnett – C, Elizabeth City State (junior)
- (United States) Jamie Brandon – G, LSU (junior)
- (United States) Charles Claxton – C, Georgia (junior)
- (United States) Rennie Clemons – G, Illinois (junior)
- (United States) Sedric Curry – F, North Dakota (junior)
- (Nigeria) Yinka Dare – C, George Washington (sophomore)
- (United States) Thomas Hamilton – C, Wabash Valley (freshman)
- (United States) Lemon Haynes – F, Augusta (junior)
- (United States) Juwan Howard – F, Michigan (junior)
- (United States) Jason Kidd – G, California (sophomore)
- (United States) Voshon Lenard – G, Minnesota (junior)
- (United States) Donyell Marshall – F, Connecticut (junior)
- (United States) Lamond Murray – F, California (junior)
- (United States) Glenn Robinson – F, Purdue (junior)
- (United States) Jalen Rose – G/F, Michigan (junior)
- (United States) Clifford Rozier – F, Louisville (junior)
- (United States) Johnny Tyson – C, Central Oklahoma (junior)
- (United States) Dontonio Wingfield – F, Cincinnati (freshman)

=== Other eligible players ===
Player	Team	Note	Ref.
(United States) Darrin Hancock	Aix Maurienne Savoie Basket (France)	Left Kansas in 1993; playing professionally since the 1993–94 season	
(United States) Cedric Moore	GSSV Donar (The Netherlands)	Left Alabama in 1993; playing professionally since the 1993–94 season	

== Invited attendees ==
The 1994 NBA draft is considered to be the seventeenth NBA draft to have utilized what's properly considered the "green room" experience for NBA prospects. The NBA's green room is a staging area where anticipated draftees often sit with their families and representatives, waiting for their names to be called on draft night. Often being positioned either in front of or to the side of the podium (in this case, being positioned somewhere within the Hoosier Dome), once a player heard his name, he would walk to the podium to shake hands and take promotional photos with the NBA commissioner. From there, the players often conducted interviews with various media outlets while backstage. From there, the players often conducted interviews with various media outlets while backstage. However, once the NBA draft started to air nationally on TV starting with the 1980 NBA draft, the green room evolved from players waiting to hear their name called and then shaking hands with these select players who were often called to the hotel to take promotional pictures with the NBA commissioner a day or two after the draft concluded to having players in real-time waiting to hear their names called up and then shaking hands with David Stern, the NBA's commissioner at the time. The NBA compiled its list of green room invites through collective voting by the NBA's team presidents and general managers alike, which in this year's case belonged to only what they believed were the top 15 prospects at the time. Surprisingly, this year's draft would not have any notable prospects who weren't invited nor fell out of the first round this time around. As such, the following players were invited to attend this year's draft festivities live and in person.

- (Nigeria) Yinka Dare – C, George Washington
- (United States) Grant Hill – SF, Duke
- (United States) Juwon Howard – PF, Michigan
- (United States) Eddie Jones – SG, Temple
- (United States) Jason Kidd – PG, California
- (United States) Donyell Marshall – SF, Connecticut
- (United States) Aaron McKie – SG, Temple
- (United States) Eric Mobley – PF, Pittsburgh
- (United States) Lamond Murray – SF, California
- (United States) Wesley Person – SG, Auburn
- (United States) Khalid Reeves – PG, Arizona
- (United States) Glenn Robinson – SF, Purdue
- (United States) Jalen Rose – SG/SF, Michigan
- (United States) Clifford Rozier – PF, Louisville
- (United States) Sharone Wright – PF/C, Clemson

== See also ==
- List of first overall NBA draft picks
