= Lamond Murray =

American basketball player (born 1973)

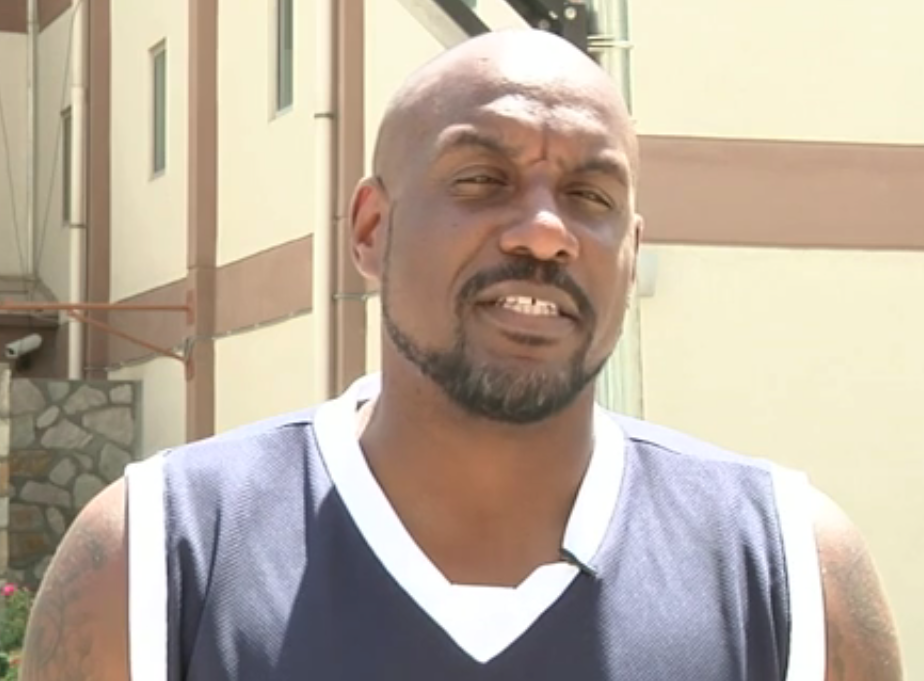
- Murray in Afghanistan in 2013

Personal information
- Born: April 20, 1973 (age 53) Pasadena, California, U.S.
- Listed height: 6 ft 7 in (2.01 m)
- Listed weight: 230 lb (104 kg)

Career information
- High school: John F. Kennedy (Fremont, California)
- College: California (1991–1994)
- NBA draft: 1994: 1st round, 7th overall pick
- Drafted by: Los Angeles Clippers
- Playing career: 1994–2012
- Position: Small forward
- Number: 7, 30, 21, 31

Career history
- 1994–1999: Los Angeles Clippers
- 1999–2002: Cleveland Cavaliers
- 2002–2005: Toronto Raptors
- 2005–2006: New Jersey Nets
- 2007: Guangdong Southern Tigers
- 2007: Long Beach Breakers
- 2008: Guangdong Southern Tigers
- 2008: Los Angeles Lightning
- 2008–2009: Guangdong Southern Tigers
- 2009: Los Angeles Lightning
- 2009–2010: Al-Muharraq
- 2010: Los Angeles Lightning
- 2010–2011: Al-Muharraq
- 2011–2012: Los Angeles Slam

Career highlights
- Consensus second-team All-American (1994); 2× First-team All-Pac-10 (1993, 1994)
- Stats at NBA.com
- Stats at Basketball Reference

Lamond Maurice Murray Sr. (born April 20, 1973) is an American former professional basketball player.

Murray was selected seventh overall by the Los Angeles Clippers in the 1994 NBA draft after a college career at the University of California at Berkeley, during which he teamed with Jason Kidd. He has played for the Clippers, the Cleveland Cavaliers, the Toronto Raptors, and the New Jersey Nets throughout his 12-year, 736-game NBA career, averaging 11.3 points per game. After one season with the Nets, he re-signed with the Clippers in October 2006 and was released several days later.

In 2002, after being traded by the Cleveland Cavaliers to the Toronto Raptors, he tore a lisfranc ligament in his right foot during a pre-season game and subsequently missed the entire 2002–03 NBA season.

In 2009, Lamond Murray joined the Bahrain Basketball Association in Bahrain. He played for Al-Muharraq Sports Club. He was inducted into the Pac-12 Basketball Hall of Honor during the 2012 Pac-12 Conference men's basketball tournament, March 10, 2012.

He is a first cousin of former NBA forward Tracy Murray.

Born in Pasadena, California, Murray graduated from John F. Kennedy High School (Fremont, California).

He is the father of professional basketball player Lamond Murray Jr.

== NBA career statistics ==
Legend
GP	Games played	GS	Games started	MPG	Minutes per game
FG%	Field goal percentage	3P%	3-point field goal percentage	FT%	Free throw percentage
RPG	Rebounds per game	APG	Assists per game	SPG	Steals per game
BPG	Blocks per game	PPG	Points per game	**Bold**	Career high
*	Led the league

=== Regular season ===
Year	Team	GP	GS	MPG	FG%	3P%	FT%	RPG	APG	SPG	BPG	PPG
1994–95	L.A. Clippers	**81**	61	31.6	.402	.298	.754	4.4	1.6	.9	**.7**	14.1
1995–96	L.A. Clippers	77	32	23.6	.447	.319	.750	3.2	1.1	.8	.3	8.4
1996–97	L.A. Clippers	74	1	17.5	.416	.341	.739	3.1	.8	.7	.4	7.4
1997–98	L.A. Clippers	79	65	**32.6**	**.481**	.353	.748	**6.1**	1.8	**1.5**	**.7**	15.4
1998–99	L.A. Clippers	50*	13	26.3	.391	.330	.803	3.9	1.2	1.2	.4	12.2
1999–00	Cleveland	74	**72**	32.0	.451	.367	.761	5.7	1.8	1.4	.5	15.9
2000–01	Cleveland	78	46	28.5	.423	.370	.735	4.4	1.6	1.1	.3	12.8
2001–02	Cleveland	71	68	32.5	.436	.424	**.817**	5.2	**2.2**	1.0	.6	**16.6**
2003–04	Toronto	33	4	15.8	.353	.350	.686	2.7	.8	.5	.2	6.0
2004–05	Toronto	62	1	14.8	.426	**.438**	.763	2.6	.8	.5	.3	6.0
2005–06	New Jersey	57	1	10.1	.398	.346	.625	2.3	.2	.3	.1	3.4
Career		736	364	25.1	.430	.360	.759	4.1	1.3	.9	.4	11.3

=== Playoffs ===
Year	Team	GP	GS	MPG	FG%	3P%	FT%	RPG	APG	SPG	BPG	PPG
1997	L.A. Clippers	3	0	**21.7**	.300	.250	**1.000**	**3.7**	**1.0**	**.7**	**1.0**	**7.0**
2006	New Jersey	**11**	0	17.9	**.389**	**.353**	.818	3.5	.2	.3	.0	5.7
Career		14	0	18.7	.365	.333	.889	3.5	.4	.4	.2	6.0
