= Damon Bailey =

American basketball player-coach

Personal information
- Born: October 21, 1971 (age 55) Heltonville, Indiana, U.S.
- Listed height: 6 ft 3 in (1.91 m)
- Listed weight: 200 lb (91 kg)

Career information
- High school: Bedford North Lawrence (Bedford, Indiana)
- College: Indiana (1990–1994)
- NBA draft: 1994: 2nd round, 44th overall pick
- Drafted by: Indiana Pacers
- Playing career: 1995–2003
- Position: Point guard
- Number: 22
- Coaching career: 2005–2017

Career history

Playing
- 1994–1995: Indiana Pacers
- 1995–1997: Fort Wayne Fury
- 1997: Pau-Orthez
- 1997–1999: Fort Wayne Fury

Coaching
- 2005–2007: Bedford North Lawrence HS
- 2009–2013: Bedford North Lawrence HS (girls'; assistant)
- 2013–2014: Bedford North Lawrence HS (girls')
- 2014–2017: Butler Bulldogs (women's assistant)

Career highlights
- All-CBA First Team (1998); All-CBA Second Team (1999); CBA assists leader (1999); Third-team All-American – AP (1994); Big Ten Freshman of the Year (1991); National high school player of the year(1990); McDonald's All-American (1990); First-team Parade All-American (1990); Second-team Parade All-American (1989); Fourth-team Parade All-American (1988); Indiana Mr. Basketball (1990)
- Stats at Basketball Reference
Medals
Men's basketball
Representing United States
Pan American Games
Silver medal – second place	1999 Winnipeg	National team

Damon Bailey (born October 21, 1971) is an American former professional basketball player. He rose to national prominence after being recruited by Indiana coach Bob Knight as an 8th grader, an unusual move at the time. Bailey went on to become Indiana's men's all-time high school leading scorer and would earn All-America honors playing for the Indiana Hoosiers. He became a cult figure during the late 1980s and early 1990s in Indiana. Bailey was an assistant coach of the Butler University's women's basketball team from 2014 to 2017.

== Prep career ==
In early 1986, when Bailey was a 14-year-old eighth-grader, Indiana coach Bob Knight watched two games featuring Bailey's team. At the time, Knight and his 1985–86 team were being covered by author John Feinstein for his book A Season on the Brink, which would later go on to be a national best-seller. After taking in the game, Knight remarked to his assistant coaches that "Damon Bailey is better than any guard we have right now. I don't mean potentially better, I mean better today." Due to the national and statewide popularity of Feinstein's book, Bailey's legend took off.

As a senior Bailey led his team to the 1990 Indiana state championship. Their opponent, Concord High School, was undefeated and led by future University of Nebraska standout Jamar Johnson. Before a crowd of more than 41,000 people at the Hoosier Dome in Indianapolis – the most people to ever attend a high school basketball game – Bailey scored 30 points, including his team's final 11, in a 63–60 come-from-behind win. Bailey told Sports Illustrated, "The greatest thrill in winning was proving to people that we could. We didn't walk out on the floor and scare anybody. We just had a lot of heart."

Bailey finished his high school career having appeared in three state Final Fours and scoring a record 3,134 points, a record that would stand for 26 years until broken by Jackie Young in 2016 with 3,268. He averaged 28.4 points per game over his four years. Bailey was named Indiana Mr. Basketball, earned McDonald's All-American honors, and was tabbed the 1990 consensus National Player of the Year. Bailey elected to play college basketball for Bob Knight's Indiana Hoosiers. After winning the state championship, Bailey told reporters, "Now, I'm his boy."

== College career ==
Bailey was a four-year starter for Bob Knight and the Indiana Hoosiers from 1990 to 1994. Teammates from this era included Greg Graham, Pat Graham, All-American Alan Henderson, and 1993 National Player of the Year Calbert Cheaney. With such talented teammates around him, Bailey largely served as a role player, averaging 11.3 points per game his first three years.

In his senior season, 1993–94, with many of the team's previous stars having graduated, Bailey served as the team's leader. In a game on December 4, 1993, in the Indiana–Kentucky rivalry, UK was ranked number one in the nation, but Indiana upset the Wildcats. Bailey hit 16-of-19 free throws (record for a single game) to score 29 points. Bailey's performance in the upset earned him a spot on the cover of Sports Illustrated, which has since become an iconic image among Indiana fans. The Hoosiers finished the season 21–9 overall, 12–6 in the Big Ten (3rd), and advanced to the NCAA Sweet 16.

=== College statistics ===
Year	Team	GP	GS	MPG	FG%	3P%	FT%	RPG	APG	SPG	BPG	PPG
1990–91	Indiana	33	14	26.0	.506	.434	.692	2.9	2.9	1.2	.3	11.4
1991–92	Indiana	34	27	27.1	.497	.471	.765	3.6	3.1	.8	.0	12.4
1992–93	Indiana	35	24	27.2	.459	.418	.728	3.3	4.1	.6	.2	10.1
1993–94	Indiana	30	30	33.9	.481	.423	.802	4.3	4.3	1.5	.2	19.6
Career		132	95	28.2	.485	.437	.754	3.5	3.6	1.0	.2	13.2

== Professional basketball career ==
Bailey was selected with the 44th overall pick in the 1994 NBA draft by his hometown team, the Indiana Pacers. Bailey was cut after one season of being on the team's injured list, and a series of pre-season games the following year. Briefly in January 1999 he signed with the Cleveland Cavaliers, but was soon let go. Bailey never played in an NBA regular-season game.

Bailey played in the Continental Basketball Association (CBA) with the Fort Wayne Fury. He was selected to the All-CBA First Team in 1998, while ranking third in the league with 7.3 assists per game, and to the Second Team in 1999. On November 1, 2003, Bailey retired from professional basketball.

== Life after pro basketball ==
He was later employed as the boys' basketball coach for his alma mater, Bedford North Lawrence High School. The team finished 11–10 in Bailey's first coaching year. The Times-Mail in Bedford, Indiana reported on March 1, 2007, that Bailey had resigned as coach of BNL after two seasons, he finished with a 23–19 overall record.

Bailey was the assistant coach of the BNL Lady Stars basketball team for four seasons, including the 2012–2013 Indiana high school state basketball championship winning team. Bailey was named the head coach of the Lady Stars in May 2013, replacing Kurt Godlevske, who left to be an assistant coach for the Butler Bulldogs women's basketball team. As the head coach in the 2013–2014 season, Bailey led the Lady Stars to their second consecutive state title. In May 2014, Godlevske was promoted to head coach for Butler's women's team, and Bailey again joined him as an assistant at Butler.

In April 2017, Bailey resigned as the Butler Bulldogs women's basketball assistant coach after three seasons. Bailey stated that he was leaving coaching to focus on Hawkins Bailey Warehouse distribution company, a business in Bedford, Indiana, of which he is a co-owner.
