= Carlos Rogers (basketball) =

American basketball player (born 1971)

Personal information
- Born: February 6, 1971 (age 55) Detroit, Michigan, U.S.
- Listed height: 6 ft 11 in (2.11 m)
- Listed weight: 232 lb (105 kg)

Career information
- High school: Northwestern (Detroit, Michigan)
- College: Little Rock (1990–1991); Tennessee State (1992–1994)
- NBA draft: 1994: 1st round, 11th overall pick
- Drafted by: Seattle SuperSonics
- Playing career: 1994–2002
- Position: Power forward / center
- Number: 34, 33, 4, 6

Career history
- 1994–1995: Golden State Warriors
- 1995–1998: Toronto Raptors
- 1998–1999: Portland Trail Blazers
- 1999–2001: Houston Rockets
- 2001–2002: Indiana Pacers

Career highlights
- Third-team All-American – UPI (1994); 2× OVC Player of the Year (1993, 1994); 2× First-team All-OVC (1993, 1994)

Career NBA statistics
- Points: 2,196
- Rebounds: 1,272
- FG%: .536
- Stats at NBA.com
- Stats at Basketball Reference
Medals
Men's basketball
Representing United States
Summer Universiade
Gold medal – first place	1993 Buffalo	National team

Carlos Deon Rogers (born February 6, 1971) is an American former professional basketball player who played eight seasons in the National Basketball Association (NBA). Rogers was an All-American college player for the Tennessee State Tigers, then was selected by the Seattle SuperSonics in the first round (11th pick overall) of the 1994 NBA draft.

== Biography ==
Rogers was born in Detroit and graduated from Northwestern High School. A 6'11" forward-center from the University of Arkansas at Little Rock and Tennessee State University, Rogers played in the NBA from 1994 to 2002, for the Golden State Warriors, Toronto Raptors, Portland Trail Blazers, Houston Rockets and Indiana Pacers.

Rogers led the United States men's national basketball team with 87 points en route to a gold medal at the 1993 Summer Universiade.

In his NBA career, Rogers played in 298 games and scored a total of 2,196 points.
