= Cleveland Cavaliers all-time roster =

The following is a list of players, both past and current, who appeared at least in one game for the Cleveland Cavaliers NBA franchise.

== Players ==
Note: Statistics are correct through the end of the 2025–26 season.

G	Guard	G/F	Guard-forward	F	Forward	F/C	Forward-center	C	Center

legend
^	Denotes player who has been inducted to the Naismith Memorial Basketball Hall of Fame
*	Denotes player who has been selected for at least one All-Star Game with the Cleveland Cavaliers and is currently on the team roster
^{+}	Denotes player who has been selected for at least one All-Star Game with the Cleveland Cavaliers
^{x}	Denotes player who is currently on the Cleveland Cavaliers roster
0.0	Denotes the Cleveland Cavaliers statistics leader (min. 100 games played for the team for per-game statistics)

=== A to B ===
All-time roster
Player	Pos.	Pre-draft team	Yrs	Seasons	Statistics									Ref.
Player	Pos.	Pre-draft team	Yrs	Seasons	GP	MP	REB	AST	PTS	MPG	RPG	APG	PPG	Ref.
Deng Adel	F	Louisville	1	2018–2019	19	194	19	5	32	10.2	1.0	0.3	1.7	
Gary Alexander	F	South Florida	1	1993–1994	7	43	12	1	17	6.1	1.7	0.1	2.4	
Jarrett Allen*	C	Texas	6	2020–2026	390	11,831	3,859	759	5,779	30.3	9.9	1.9	14.8	
Lance Allred	C	Weber State	1	2007–2008	3	10	1	0	3	3.3	0.3	0.0	1.0	
John Amaechi	F/C	Penn State	1	1995–1996	28	357	52	9	77	12.8	1.9	0.3	2.8	
Lou Amundson	F/C	UNLV	1	2014–2015	12	79	20	5	11	6.6	1.7	0.4	0.9	
Chris Andersen	F/C	Blinn	1	2016–2017	12	114	31	5	28	9.5	2.6	0.4	2.3	
Cliff Anderson	G/F	Saint Joseph's	1	1970–1971	23	171	37	16	79	7.4	1.6	0.7	3.4	
Derek Anderson	G	Kentucky	2	1997–1999	104	2,817	296	372	1,179	27.1	2.8	3.6	11.3	
Justin Anderson	G/F	Virginia	1	2021–2022	3	47	6	6	13	15.7	2.0	2.0	4.3	
Ron Anderson	G/F	Fresno State	2	1984–1986	53	727	114	42	296	13.7	2.2	0.8	5.6	
Martynas Andriuškevičius	C	(Lithuania) Žalgiris Kaunas	1	2005–2006	6	9	4	0	0	1.5	0.7	0.0	0.0	
Miloš Babić	F/C	Tennessee Tech	1	1990–1991	12	52	9	4	19	4.3	0.8	0.3	1.6	
John Bagley	G	Boston College	5	1982–1987	375	9,757	1,070	2,311	3,542	26.0	2.9	6.2	9.4	
Lonzo Ball	G	UCLA	1	2025–2026	35	728	140	136	160	20.8	4.0	3.9	4.6	
Emoni Bates	F	Eastern Michigan	2	2023–2025	25	208	21	18	78	8.3	0.8	0.7	3.1	
Tony Battie	F/C	Texas Tech	1	2003–2004	50	977	241	37	272	19.5	4.8	0.7	5.4	
John Battle	G	Rutgers	4	1991–1995	196	3,228	191	333	1,456	16.5	1.0	1.7	7.4	
Butch Beard^{+}	G	Louisville	2	1971–1972; 1975–1976	83	2,689	319	501	1,145	32.4	3.8	6.0	13.8	
Benoit Benjamin	C	Creighton	1	1999–2000	3	8	1	0	2	2.7	0.3	0.0	0.7	
Anthony Bennett	F	UNLV	1	2013–2014	52	663	155	17	217	12.8	3.0	0.3	4.2	
Elmer Bennett	G	Notre Dame	1	1994–1995	4	18	1	3	15	4.5	0.3	0.8	3.8	
Mel Bennett	F	Pittsburgh	1	1981–1982	3	23	3	0	5	7.7	1.0	0.0	1.7	
Winston Bennett	F	Kentucky	3	1989–1992	134	2,155	413	120	646	16.1	3.1	0.9	4.8	
Kent Benson	C	Indiana	1	1987–1988	2	12	1	0	5	6.0	0.5	0.0	2.5	
Jaron Blossomgame	F	Clemson	1	2018–2019	27	439	98	13	114	16.3	3.6	0.5	4.2	
Corie Blount	F	Cincinnati	1	1998–1999	20	368	105	10	68	18.4	5.3	0.5	3.4	
Andrew Bogut	C	Utah	1	2016–2017	1	1	0	0	0	1.0	0.0	0.0	0.0	
Etdrick Bohannon	F	Auburn Montgomery	1	2000–2001	6	19	7	0	8	3.2	1.2	0.0	1.3	
Marques Bolden	C	Duke	2	2019–2021	7	32	8	0	7	4.6	1.1	0.0	1.0	
Carlos Boozer	F/C	Duke	2	2002–2004	156	4,641	1,466	254	1,972	29.8	9.4	1.6	12.6	
Earl Boykins	G	Eastern Michigan	2	1998–2000	42	423	38	72	176	10.1	0.9	1.7	4.2	
A. J. Bramlett	C	Arizona	1	1999–2000	8	61	22	0	8	7.6	2.8	0.0	1.0	
Terrell Brandon^{+}	G	Oregon	6	1991–1997	457	12,174	1,235	2,235	5,793	26.6	2.7	4.9	12.7	
Brad Branson	F/C	SMU	1	1981–1982	10	176	33	6	53	17.6	3.3	0.6	5.3	
Mike Bratz	G	Stanford	1	1980–1981	80	2,595	198	452	802	32.4	2.5	5.7	10.0	
J. R. Bremer	G	St. Bonaventure	1	2003–2004	31	403	33	39	110	13.0	1.1	1.3	3.5	
Jim Brewer	F/C	Minnesota	6	1973–1979	462	12,537	3,551	853	3,461	27.1	7.7	1.8	7.5	
Ron Brewer	G	Arkansas	3	1981–1983; 1985–1986	108	2,839	201	188	1,357	26.3	1.9	1.7	12.6	
Gary Brokaw	G	Notre Dame	1	1976–1977	39	596	59	117	282	15.3	1.5	3.0	7.2	
Scott Brooks	G	UC Irvine	1	1997–1998	43	312	30	49	79	7.3	0.7	1.1	1.8	
Chucky Brown	F	NC State	4	1989–1992; 2000–2001	175	3,139	486	139	1,265	17.9	2.8	0.8	7.2	
Darius Brown	G	Utah State	1	2025–2026	1	3	1	0	0	3.0	1.0	0.0	0.0	
Devin Brown	G	UTSA	1	2007–2008	78	1,762	263	175	586	22.6	3.4	2.2	7.5	
Kedrick Brown	G	Northwest Florida State	1	2003–2004	34	561	78	39	179	16.5	2.3	1.1	5.3	
Moses Brown	C	UCLA	1	2021–2022	14	176	74	0	90	12.6	5.3	0.0	6.4	
Shannon Brown	G	Michigan State	2	2006–2008	38	420	39	27	178	11.1	1.0	0.7	4.7	
Tierre Brown	G	McNeese State	1	2002–2003	15	168	30	39	65	11.2	2.0	2.6	4.3	
Mark Bryant	F/C	Seton Hall	1	1999–2000	75	1,712	352	61	424	22.8	4.7	0.8	5.7	
Thomas Bryant^{x}	C	Indiana	1	2025–2026	60	732	205	33	370	12.2	3.4	0.6	6.2	
Alec Burks	G	Colorado	1	2018–2019	34	979	186	98	396	28.8	5.5	2.9	11.6	
Mitchell Butler	G/F	UCLA	2	1997–1999	49	624	66	40	205	12.7	1.3	0.8	4.2	
Andrew Bynum	C	St. Joseph HS (NJ)	1	2013–2014	24	480	126	27	202	20.0	5.3	1.1	8.4	

=== C ===
All-time roster
Player	Pos.	Pre-draft team	Yrs	Seasons	Statistics									Ref.
Player	Pos.	Pre-draft team	Yrs	Seasons	GP	MP	REB	AST	PTS	MPG	RPG	APG	PPG	Ref.
Michael Cage	F/C	San Diego State	2	1994–1996	164	4,671	1,293	109	897	28.5	7.9	0.7	5.5	
José Calderón	G	(Spain) Tau Cerámica	1	2017–2018	57	914	84	117	255	16.0	1.5	2.1	4.5	
Mack Calvin	G	USC	1	1980–1981	21	128	12	28	52	6.1	0.6	1.3	2.5	
Tony Campbell	G/F	Ohio State	1	1994–1995	78	1,128	153	69	469	14.5	2.0	0.9	6.0	
Austin Carr^{+} (#34)	G	Notre Dame	9	1971–1980	635	19,003	1,929	1,820	10,265	29.9	3.0	2.9	16.2	
Kenny Carr	F	NC State	3	1979–1982	201	5,878	1,800	331	2,831	29.2	9.0	1.6	14.1	
Omri Casspi	F	(Israel) Maccabi Tel Aviv	2	2011–2013	108	1,844	342	94	632	17.1	3.2	0.9	5.9	
Len Chappell	F/C	Wake Forest	1	1970–1971	6	86	18	1	41	14.3	3.0	0.2	6.8	
Will Cherry	G	Montana	1	2014–2015	8	69	5	8	15	8.6	0.6	1.0	1.9	
Derrick Chievous	F	Missouri	2	1989–1991	32	209	33	6	92	6.5	1.0	0.2	2.9	
Pete Chilcutt	F/C	North Carolina	1	1999–2000	6	30	9	1	0	5.0	1.5	0.2	0.0	
Jim Chones	F/C	Marquette	5	1974–1979	400	13,302	3,790	711	5,729	33.3	9.5	1.8	14.3	
Marquese Chriss	F	Washington	1	2018–2019	27	395	114	16	153	14.6	4.2	0.6	5.7	
Earl Clark	F	Louisville	1	2013–2014	45	698	127	16	234	15.5	2.8	0.4	5.2	
Jordan Clarkson	G	Missouri	3	2017–2020	138	3,512	397	314	2,140	25.4	2.9	2.3	15.5	
Jim Cleamons	G	Ohio State	5	1972–1977	377	10,605	1,353	1,549	3,532	28.1	3.6	4.1	9.4	
Mateen Cleaves	G	Michigan State	1	2003–2004	4	92	7	19	15	23.0	1.8	4.8	3.8	
Barry Clemens	F	Ohio Wesleyan	2	1972–1974	143	2,032	377	195	859	14.2	2.6	1.4	6.0	
Bimbo Coles	G	Virginia Tech	3	2000–2003	115	2,013	151	301	483	17.5	1.3	2.6	4.2	
Steve Colter	G	New Mexico State	1	1994–1995	57	752	59	101	196	13.2	1.0	1.8	3.4	
Jeff Cook	F/C	Idaho State	3	1982–1985	129	3,172	794	190	792	24.6	6.2	1.5	6.1	
Quinn Cook	G	Duke	1	2020–2021	7	95	12	13	43	13.6	1.7	1.9	6.1	
Tyler Cook	F	Iowa	1	2019–2020	11	35	10	1	19	3.2	0.9	0.1	1.7	
Joe Cooke	G	Indiana	1	1970–1971	73	725	114	93	316	9.9	1.6	1.3	4.3	
Tyrone Corbin	G/F	DePaul	2	1986–1988	86	1,586	316	73	522	18.4	3.7	0.8	6.1	
Joe Courtney	F	Southern Miss	1	1995–1996	23	200	49	9	38	8.7	2.1	0.4	1.7	
Geoff Crompton	C	North Carolina	1	1983–1984	7	23	9	1	5	3.3	1.3	0.1	0.7	
John Crotty	G	Virginia	1	1995–1996	58	617	54	102	172	10.6	0.9	1.8	3.0	
Jae Crowder	F	Marquette	1	2017–2018	53	1,346	173	58	454	25.4	3.3	1.1	8.6	
Jared Cunningham	G	Oregon State	1	2015–2016	40	355	29	19	104	8.9	0.7	0.5	2.6	
Dell Curry	G	Virginia Tech	1	1987–1988	79	1,499	166	149	787	19.0	2.1	1.9	10.0	
Seth Curry	G	Duke	1	2013–2014	1	9	1	0	3	9.0	1.0	0.0	3.0	

=== D ===
All-time roster
Player	Pos.	Pre-draft team	Yrs	Seasons	Statistics									Ref.
Player	Pos.	Pre-draft team	Yrs	Seasons	GP	MP	REB	AST	PTS	MPG	RPG	APG	PPG	Ref.
Brad Daugherty (#43)	C	North Carolina	8	1986–1994	548	20,029	5,227	2,028	10,389	36.5	9.5	3.7	19.0	
Kornél Dávid	F	(Hungary) Budapesti Honvéd	1	1999–2000	6	31	8	1	11	5.2	1.3	0.2	1.8	
Baron Davis	G	UCLA	1	2010–2011	15	380	36	92	208	25.3	2.4	6.1	13.9	
Charlie Davis	G	Wake Forest	2	1971–1973	67	1,230	97	133	644	18.4	1.4	2.0	9.6	
Dwight Davis	F	Houston	3	1972–1975	235	6,592	1,671	454	2,477	28.1	7.1	1.9	10.5	
Ed Davis	F/C	North Carolina	1	2021–2022	31	201	64	7	28	6.5	2.1	0.2	0.9	
Harry Davis	F	Florida State	1	1978–1979	40	394	66	16	162	9.9	1.7	0.4	4.1	
Johnny Davis	G	Dayton	2	1984–1986	115	2,532	155	531	1,214	22.0	1.3	4.6	10.6	
Ricky Davis	G	Iowa	3	2001–2004	183	5,881	754	725	2,921	32.1	4.1	4.0	16.0	
Andrew DeClercq	F/C	Florida	2	1998–2000	115	2,675	631	79	840	23.3	5.5	0.7	7.3	
Sam Dekker	F	Wisconsin	1	2018–2019	9	169	33	9	57	18.8	3.7	1.0	6.3	
Matthew Dellavedova	G	Saint Mary's	6	2013–2016; 2018–2021	321	6,278	577	1,118	1,702	19.6	1.8	3.5	5.3	
Luol Deng	F	Duke	1	2013–2014	40	1,353	203	98	573	33.8	5.1	2.5	14.3	
Mamadi Diakite	F/C	Virginia	1	2022–2023	22	176	30	8	57	8.0	1.4	0.4	2.6	
Kaniel Dickens	F	Idaho	1	2007–2008	5	12	1	1	2	2.4	0.2	0.2	0.4	
Mickey Dillard	G	Florida State	1	1981–1982	33	221	15	34	73	6.7	0.5	1.0	2.2	
DeSagana Diop	C	Oak Hill Academy (VA)	4	2001–2005	193	2,088	501	97	310	10.8	2.6	0.5	1.6	
Michael Doleac	C	Utah	1	2001–2002	42	705	168	25	194	16.8	4.0	0.6	4.6	
Damyean Dotson	G	Houston	1	2020–2021	46	907	93	91	308	19.7	2.0	2.0	6.7	
Greg Dreiling	C	Kansas	1	1994–1995	58	483	116	22	110	8.3	2.0	0.4	1.9	
Andre Drummond	C	UConn	2	2019–2021	33	947	428	78	577	28.7	12.9	2.4	17.5	
Chris Dudley	C	Yale	3	1987–1990	153	1,741	504	64	539	11.4	3.3	0.4	3.5	
Tony Dumas	G	Kansas City	1	1997–1998	7	47	5	5	14	6.7	0.7	0.7	2.0	
Mike Dunleavy Jr.	G/F	Duke	1	2016–2017	23	366	47	20	106	15.9	2.0	0.9	4.6	

=== E to F ===
All-time roster
Player	Pos.	Pre-draft team	Yrs	Seasons	Statistics									Ref.
Player	Pos.	Pre-draft team	Yrs	Seasons	GP	MP	REB	AST	PTS	MPG	RPG	APG	PPG	Ref.
James Edwards	F/C	Washington	2	1981–1983	92	2,921	677	136	1,472	31.8	7.4	1.5	16.0	
Shane Edwards	F	Little Rock	1	2013–2014	2	12	2	0	2	6.0	1.0	0.0	1.0	
Johnny Egan	G	Providence	1	1970–1971	26	410	32	58	105	15.8	1.2	2.2	4.0	
Craig Ehlo	G/F	Washington State	7	1986–1993	513	14,701	2,267	1,803	5,103	28.7	4.4	3.5	9.9	
Wayne Ellington	G	North Carolina	1	2012–2013	38	985	114	62	396	25.9	3.0	1.6	10.4	
Keon Ellis^{x}	G	Alabama	1	2025–2026	29	720	80	46	241	24.8	2.8	1.6	8.3	
Tristan Enaruna^{x}	F	Cleveland State	1	2025–2026	9	85	14	7	37	9.4	1.6	0.8	4.1	
Semih Erden	C	(Turkey) Fenerbahçe	2	2010–2012	32	397	83	10	112	12.4	2.6	0.3	3.5	
Mike Evans	G	Kansas State	1	1981–1982	8	74	10	20	27	9.3	1.3	2.5	3.4	
Dante Exum	G	(Australia) Australian Institute of Sport	2	2019–2021	30	518	72	46	158	17.3	2.4	1.5	5.3	
Christian Eyenga	F	(Spain) Joventut Badalona	2	2010–2012	50	1,030	135	39	312	20.6	2.7	0.8	6.2	
Tacko Fall	C	UCF	1	2021–2022	11	59	23	2	12	5.4	2.1	0.2	1.1	
Kay Felder	G	Oakland	1	2016–2017	42	386	41	58	166	9.2	1.0	1.4	4.0	
Carrick Felix	G	Arizona State	1	2013–2014	7	38	6	4	19	5.4	0.9	0.6	2.7	
Eric Fernsten	F/C	San Francisco	1	1975–1976	4	9	1	0	0	2.3	0.3	0.0	0.0	
Yogi Ferrell	G	Indiana	1	2020–2021	2	40	7	5	19	20.0	3.5	2.5	9.5	
Danny Ferry	F	Duke	10	1990–2000	723	15,045	2,162	1,045	5,643	20.8	3.0	1.4	7.8	
Bruce Flowers	F	Notre Dame	1	1982–1983	53	699	180	47	261	13.2	3.4	0.9	4.9	
Don Ford	F	UC Santa Barbara	3	1979–1982	106	1,616	286	124	398	15.2	2.7	1.2	3.8	
Fred Foster	F	Miami (OH)	2	1973–1975	131	1,785	218	165	781	13.6	1.7	1.3	6.0	
Tim Frazier	G	Penn State	1	2021–2022	2	8	0	1	2	4.0	0.0	0.5	1.0	
Walt Frazier^	G	Southern Illinois	3	1977–1980	66	1,970	232	249	964	29.8	3.5	3.8	14.6	
World B. Free	G	Guilford	4	1982–1986	275	9,097	803	1,061	6,329	33.1	2.9	3.9	23.0	
Gary Freeman	F	Oregon State	1	1970–1971	11	47	8	4	15	4.3	0.7	0.4	1.4	
Channing Frye	F/C	Arizona	4	2015–2019	180	2,730	545	119	1,213	15.2	3.0	0.7	6.7	
Terry Furlow	G/F	Michigan State	2	1977–1979	102	1,937	203	175	1,125	19.0	2.0	1.7	11.0	

=== G to H ===
All-time roster
Player	Pos.	Pre-draft team	Yrs	Seasons	Statistics									Ref.
Player	Pos.	Pre-draft team	Yrs	Seasons	GP	MP	REB	AST	PTS	MPG	RPG	APG	PPG	Ref.
Darius Garland^{+}	G	Vanderbilt	7	2019–2026	408	13,485	1,078	2,738	7,671	33.1	2.6	6.7	18.8	
Rowland Garrett	F	Florida State	2	1975–1977	70	431	82	17	215	6.2	1.2	0.2	3.1	
John Garris	F	Boston College	1	1983–1984	33	267	77	10	131	8.1	2.3	0.3	4.0	
Chris Gatling	F/C	Old Dominion	1	2000–2001	74	1,670	391	61	842	22.6	5.3	0.8	11.4	
Reggie Geary	G	Arizona	1	1996–1997	39	246	15	36	57	6.3	0.4	0.9	1.5	
Alonzo Gee	G	Alabama	4	2010–2014	250	6,361	948	326	2,062	25.4	3.8	1.3	8.2	
Daniel Gibson	G	Texas	7	2006–2013	397	9,316	792	775	3,115	23.5	2.0	2.0	7.8	
Drew Gooden	F	Kansas	4	2004–2008	292	8,499	2,522	324	3,488	29.1	8.6	1.1	11.9	
Brandon Goodwin	G	Florida Gulf Coast	1	2021–2022	36	502	67	91	171	13.9	1.9	2.5	4.8	
Greg Graham	G	Indiana	1	1997–1998	6	56	1	6	16	9.3	0.2	1.0	2.7	
Joey Graham	F	Oklahoma State	1	2010–2011	39	586	84	18	202	15.0	2.2	0.5	5.2	
Stephen Graham	G	Oklahoma State	1	2005–2006	13	117	17	3	36	9.0	1.3	0.2	2.8	
Stewart Granger	G	Villanova	1	1983–1984	56	738	55	134	251	13.2	1.0	2.4	4.5	
Butch Graves	G	Yale	1	1984–1985	4	11	2	1	5	2.8	0.5	0.3	1.3	
Danny Green	G/F	North Carolina	2	2009–2010; 2022–2023	28	210	27	9	92	7.5	1.0	0.3	3.3	
Javonte Green	G	Radford	1	2024–2025	18	166	40	11	59	9.2	2.2	0.6	3.3	
Jeff Green	F	Georgetown	1	2017–2018	78	1,828	246	99	846	23.4	3.2	1.3	10.8	
Litterial Green	G	Georgia	1	1998–1999	1	2	0	0	0	2.0	0.0	0.0	0.0	
Jay Guidinger	C	Minnesota Duluth	2	1992–1994	64	346	97	20	98	5.4	1.5	0.3	1.5	
Zendon Hamilton	F/C	St. John's	1	2005–2006	11	46	11	0	25	4.2	1.0	0.0	2.3	
Luke Harangody	F	Notre Dame	2	2010–2012	42	630	141	26	190	15.0	3.4	0.6	4.5	
James Harden^{x}	G	Arizona State	1	2025–2026	26	879	124	199	534	33.8	4.8	7.7	20.5	
Ron Harper	G/F	Miami (OH)	4	1986–1990	228	8,007	1,072	1,158	4,433	35.1	4.7	5.1	19.4	
Matt Harpring	F	Georgia Tech	1	2000–2001	56	1,615	242	102	623	28.8	4.3	1.8	11.1	
Joe Harris	G	Virginia	2	2014–2016	56	508	44	28	139	9.1	0.8	0.5	2.5	
Lucious Harris	G	Long Beach State	1	2004–2005	73	1,128	121	49	313	15.5	1.7	0.7	4.3	
Manny Harris	G	Michigan	2	2010–2012	80	1,389	210	116	494	17.4	2.6	1.5	6.2	
Andrew Harrison	G	Kentucky	1	2018–2019	10	144	15	17	43	14.4	1.5	1.7	4.3	
Isaiah Hartenstein	C	(Lithuania) Žalgiris Kaunas	1	2020–2021	16	287	96	40	132	17.9	6.0	2.5	8.3	
Spencer Hawes	F/C	Washington	1	2013–2014	27	804	208	64	365	29.8	7.7	2.4	13.5	
Michael Hawkins	G	Xavier	1	2000–2001	10	76	5	13	8	7.6	0.5	1.3	0.8	
Steve Hayes	C	Idaho State	1	1982–1983	65	1,058	236	36	237	16.3	3.6	0.6	3.6	
Brendan Haywood	C	North Carolina	1	2014–2015	22	119	29	2	35	5.4	1.3	0.1	1.6	
Alan Henderson	F	Indiana	1	2005–2006	51	531	137	10	127	10.4	2.7	0.2	2.5	
Cedric Henderson	F	Memphis	4	1997–2001	248	6,112	752	415	1,849	24.6	3.0	1.7	7.5	
Kevin Henderson	G	Cal State Fullerton	1	1987–1988	5	20	4	2	9	4.0	0.8	0.4	1.8	
Mark Hendrickson	F	Washington State	1	1999–2000	10	47	11	3	12	4.7	1.1	0.3	1.2	
John Henson	F/C	North Carolina	1	2019–2020	29	412	114	43	145	14.2	3.9	1.5	5.0	
Keith Herron	G/F	Villanova	1	1981–1982	30	269	21	23	85	9.0	0.7	0.8	2.8	
JJ Hickson	F/C	NC State	3	2008–2011	223	4,652	1,260	140	2,039	20.9	5.7	0.6	9.1	
Rod Higgins	F	Fresno State	1	1993–1994	36	547	82	36	195	15.2	2.3	1.0	5.4	
Kenny Higgs	G	LSU	1	1978–1979	68	1,050	102	141	339	15.4	1.5	2.1	5.0	
George Hill	G	IUPUI	2	2017–2019	37	1,013	91	103	366	27.4	2.5	2.8	9.9	
Tyrone Hill	F	Xavier	6	1993–1997; 2001–2003	303	9,020	2,785	281	3,274	29.8	9.2	0.9	10.8	
Roy Hinson	F/C	Rutgers	3	1983–1986	238	7,036	1,734	239	3,244	29.6	7.3	1.0	13.6	
John Holland	G/F	Boston University	2	2017–2019	25	175	24	5	54	7.0	1.0	0.2	2.2	
Ryan Hollins	C	UCLA	2	2010–2012	94	1,544	242	32	462	16.4	2.6	0.3	4.9	
Rodney Hood	G/F	Duke	2	2017–2019	66	1,766	166	122	774	26.8	2.5	1.8	11.7	
Scotty Hopson	G	Tennessee	1	2013–2014	2	7	0	1	1	3.5	0.0	0.5	0.5	
Greg Howard	F/C	New Mexico	1	1971–1972	48	426	108	27	139	8.9	2.3	0.6	2.9	
Mo Howard	G	Maryland	1	1976–1977	9	28	5	5	21	3.1	0.6	0.6	2.3	
Phil Hubbard	F/C	Michigan	8	1981–1989	469	11,281	2,360	570	4,962	24.1	5.0	1.2	10.6	
Lester Hudson	G	UT Martin	1	2011–2012	13	314	46	35	165	24.2	3.5	2.7	12.7	
Larry Hughes	G	Saint Louis	3	2005–2008	146	5,087	571	481	2,094	34.8	3.9	3.3	14.3	
De'Andre Hunter	F	Virginia	2	2024–2026	70	1,801	295	124	986	25.7	4.2	1.8	14.1	
Geoff Huston	G	Texas Tech	5	1980–1985	268	7,801	445	1,630	2,788	29.1	1.7	6.1	10.4	

=== I to J ===
All-time roster
Player	Pos.	Pre-draft team	Yrs	Seasons	Statistics									Ref.
Player	Pos.	Pre-draft team	Yrs	Seasons	GP	MP	REB	AST	PTS	MPG	RPG	APG	PPG	Ref.
Zydrunas Ilgauskas^{+} (#11)	C	(Lithuania) Atletas Kaunas	12	1997–1999; 2000–2010	771	21,820	5,904	929	10,616	28.3	7.7	1.2	13.8	
Kyrie Irving^{+}	G	Duke	6	2011–2017	381	13,024	1,290	2,114	8,232	34.2	3.4	5.5	21.6	
Jarrett Jack	G	Georgia Tech	1	2013–2014	80	2,252	223	324	760	28.2	2.8	4.1	9.5	
Cedric Jackson	G	Cleveland State	1	2009–2010	5	10	1	2	1	2.0	0.2	0.4	0.2	
Darnell Jackson	F	Kansas	2	2008–2010	78	544	107	12	119	7.0	1.4	0.2	1.5	
Jim Jackson	G	Ohio State	1	2000–2001	39	1,140	145	113	400	29.2	3.7	2.9	10.3	
Luke Jackson	F	Oregon	2	2004–2006	46	358	46	28	125	7.8	1.0	0.6	2.7	
Henry James	F	St. Mary's (TX)	3	1990–1992; 1997–1998	130	1,537	206	62	798	11.8	1.6	0.5	6.1	
LeBron James^{+}	G/F	St. Vincent–St. Mary HS (OH)	11	2003–2010; 2014–2018	849	33,130	6,190	6,228	23,119	39.0	7.3	7.3	27.2	
Antawn Jamison	F	North Carolina	3	2009–2012	146	4,804	976	256	2,523	32.9	6.7	1.8	17.3	
Richard Jefferson	F	Arizona	2	2015–2017	153	2,940	331	137	858	19.2	2.2	0.9	5.6	
Ty Jerome	G	Virginia	2	2023–2025	72	1,407	174	240	882	19.5	2.4	3.3	12.3	
Anthony Johnson	G	College of Charleston	1	2000–2001	28	232	21	44	66	8.3	0.8	1.6	2.4	
Darryl Johnson	G	Michigan State	1	1995–1996	11	28	2	1	12	2.5	0.2	0.1	1.1	
Eddie Johnson	G	Auburn	1	1985–1986	32	615	46	114	315	19.2	1.4	3.6	9.8	
John Johnson^{+}	F	Iowa	3	1970–1973	231	8,166	1,636	1,047	3,684	35.4	7.1	4.5	15.9	
Kannard Johnson	F	Western Kentucky	1	1987–1988	4	12	0	0	2	3.0	0.0	0.0	0.5	
Kevin Johnson	G	California	1	1987–1988	52	1,043	72	193	380	20.1	1.4	3.7	7.3	
Reggie Johnson	F/C	Tennessee	1	1981–1982	23	617	125	22	223	26.8	5.4	1.0	9.7	
Trey Johnson	G	Jackson State	1	2008–2009	4	14	1	0	4	3.5	0.3	0.0	1.0	
Dahntay Jones	G/F	Duke	2	2015–2017	2	54	7	3	22	27.0	3.5	1.5	11.0	
Damian Jones	C	Vanderbilt	1	2023–2024	39	270	62	15	107	6.9	1.6	0.4	2.7	
Damon Jones	G	Houston	3	2005–2008	209	4,598	271	389	1,382	22.0	1.3	1.9	6.6	
Dwayne Jones	F/C	Saint Joseph's	2	2006–2008	60	490	146	10	81	8.2	2.4	0.2	1.4	
Edgar Jones	F/C	Nevada	2	1984–1986	79	1,458	316	56	726	18.5	4.0	0.7	9.2	
Jalen Jones	G	Texas A&M	1	2018–2019	16	214	34	7	81	13.4	2.1	0.4	5.1	
James Jones	G/F	Miami (FL)	3	2014–2017	153	1,513	149	52	560	9.9	1.0	0.3	3.7	
Jumaine Jones	F	Georgia	2	2001–2003	161	4,346	895	228	1,455	27.0	5.6	1.4	9.0	
Kevin Jones	F	West Virginia	1	2012–2013	32	334	78	10	95	10.4	2.4	0.3	3.0	
Eddie Jordan	G	Rutgers	1	1977–1978	22	171	11	32	50	7.8	0.5	1.5	2.3	
Walter Jordan	F	Purdue	1	1980–1981	30	207	42	11	68	6.9	1.4	0.4	2.3	

=== K to L ===
All-time roster
Player	Pos.	Pre-draft team	Yrs	Seasons	Statistics									Ref.
Player	Pos.	Pre-draft team	Yrs	Seasons	GP	MP	REB	AST	PTS	MPG	RPG	APG	PPG	Ref.
Mfiondu Kabengele	F/C	Florida State	1	2020–2021	16	186	46	12	68	11.6	2.9	0.8	4.3	
Jason Kapono	F	UCLA	1	2003–2004	41	427	55	14	145	10.4	1.3	0.3	3.5	
Sergey Karasev	G/F	(Russia) Triumph Lyubertsy	1	2013–2014	22	156	16	6	37	7.1	0.7	0.3	1.7	
Coby Karl	G	Boise State	1	2009–2010	3	5	2	0	0	1.7	0.7	0.0	0.0	
Sasha Kaun	C	Kansas	1	2015–2016	25	95	26	3	23	3.8	1.0	0.1	0.9	
Shawn Kemp^{+}	F/C	Concord HS (IN)	3	1997–2000	204	6,736	1,858	436	3,767	33.0	9.1	2.1	18.5	
Tim Kempton	F/C	Notre Dame	1	1993–1994	4	33	10	3	14	8.3	2.5	0.8	3.5	
D. J. Kennedy	F	St. John's	1	2011–2012	2	59	7	3	12	29.5	3.5	1.5	6.0	
Larry Kenon	F	Memphis	1	1982–1983	32	624	117	34	235	19.5	3.7	1.1	7.3	
Steve Kerr	G	Arizona	4	1989–1993	188	3,457	220	500	1,122	18.4	1.2	2.7	6.0	
Lari Ketner	F/C	UMass	1	1999–2000	16	91	27	0	24	5.7	1.7	0.0	1.5	
Randolph Keys	G/F	Southern Miss	2	1988–1990	90	1,223	193	58	534	13.6	2.1	0.6	5.9	
Chad Kinch	G	Charlotte	1	1980–1981	29	247	24	35	80	8.5	0.8	1.2	2.8	
Tarence Kinsey	G	South Carolina	1	2008–2009	50	277	38	10	102	5.5	0.8	0.2	2.0	
Alex Kirk	C	New Mexico	1	2014–2015	5	14	1	1	4	2.8	0.2	0.2	0.8	
Brandon Knight	G	Kentucky	2	2018–2020	27	618	50	62	230	22.9	1.9	2.3	8.5	
Brevin Knight	G	Stanford	4	1997–2001	190	5,516	584	1,441	1,707	29.0	3.1	7.6	9.0	
Luke Kornet	C	Vanderbilt	1	2021–2022	2	15	3	1	4	7.5	1.5	0.5	2.0	
Kyle Korver	G/F	Creighton	3	2016–2019	124	2,684	291	140	1,153	21.6	2.3	1.1	9.3	
Sam Lacey	C	New Mexico State	1	1982–1983	60	1,232	231	118	253	20.5	3.9	2.0	4.2	
Bill Laimbeer	C	Notre Dame	2	1980–1982	131	3,354	970	261	1,125	25.6	7.4	2.0	8.6	
John Lambert	F/C	USC	6	1975–1981	340	4,325	1,225	187	1,333	12.7	3.6	0.6	3.9	
Jerome Lane	F	Pittsburgh	1	1992–1993	21	149	53	17	59	7.1	2.5	0.8	2.8	
Antonio Lang	G/F	Duke	3	1995–1997; 1998–1999	115	1,275	196	46	300	11.1	1.7	0.4	2.6	
Trajan Langdon	G	Duke	3	1999–2002	119	1,738	159	152	647	14.6	1.3	1.3	5.4	
Butch Lee	G	Marquette	2	1978–1980	36	806	70	129	383	22.4	1.9	3.6	10.6	
Keith Lee	F/C	Memphis	2	1985–1987	125	2,067	602	136	843	16.5	4.8	1.1	6.7	
Jon Leuer	F	Wisconsin	1	2012–2013	9	91	13	5	22	10.1	1.4	0.6	2.4	
Caris LeVert	G/F	Michigan	4	2021–2025	199	5,666	733	848	2,495	28.5	3.7	4.3	12.5	
Bobby Lewis	G	North Carolina	1	1970–1971	79	1,852	206	244	467	23.4	2.6	3.1	5.9	
DeAndre Liggins	G	Kentucky	1	2016–2017	61	752	101	54	144	12.3	1.7	0.9	2.4	
Chris Livingston	F	Kentucky	1	2025–2026	3	17	3	1	9	5.7	1.0	0.3	3.0	
Shaun Livingston	G	Peoria HS (IL)	1	2012–2013	49	1,135	121	177	354	23.2	2.5	3.6	7.2	
Robin Lopez	C	Stanford	1	2022–2023	37	299	51	19	112	8.1	1.4	0.5	3.0	
Kevin Love^{+}	F	UCLA	9	2014–2023	489	13,978	4,493	1,098	7,663	28.6	9.2	2.2	15.7	

=== M ===
All-time roster
Player	Pos.	Pre-draft team	Yrs	Seasons	Statistics									Ref.
Player	Pos.	Pre-draft team	Yrs	Seasons	GP	MP	REB	AST	PTS	MPG	RPG	APG	PPG	Ref.
J. P. Macura	G	Xavier	1	2019–2020	1	1	0	0	0	1.0	0.0	0.0	0.0	
Gerald Madkins	G	UCLA	2	1993–1995	29	177	11	20	43	6.1	0.4	0.7	1.5	
Dave Magley	F	Kansas	1	1982–1983	14	56	10	2	12	4.0	0.7	0.1	0.9	
Dan Majerle	G/F	Central Michigan	1	1995–1996	82	2,367	305	214	872	28.9	3.7	2.6	10.6	
Thon Maker	F/C	Orangeville Prep (CAN)	1	2020–2021	8	76	18	4	30	9.5	2.3	0.5	3.8	
Shawn Marion	F	UNLV	1	2014–2015	57	1,101	202	51	276	19.3	3.5	0.9	4.8	
Lauri Markkanen	F	Arizona	1	2021–2022	61	1,878	345	81	900	30.8	5.7	1.3	14.8	
Donny Marshall	F	UConn	3	1995–1997; 1999–2000	96	795	97	31	263	8.3	1.0	0.3	2.7	
Donyell Marshall	F	UConn	3	2005–2008	173	3,593	845	111	1,357	20.8	4.9	0.6	7.8	
Jeremiah Martin	G	Memphis	1	2020–2021	9	75	7	4	22	8.3	0.8	0.4	2.4	
Patrick McCaw	G	UNLV	1	2018–2019	3	53	3	2	5	17.7	1.0	0.7	1.7	
Jelani McCoy	C	UCLA	1	2003–2004	2	12	4	0	0	6.0	2.0	0.0	0.0	
Scooter McCray	G/F	Louisville	1	1986–1987	24	279	58	23	80	11.6	2.4	1.0	3.3	
Ben McDonald	F	UC Irvine	1	1985–1986	21	266	38	9	61	12.7	1.8	0.4	2.9	
JaVale McGee	C	Nevada	1	2020–2021	33	503	170	33	265	15.2	5.2	1.0	8.0	
Jeff McInnis	G	North Carolina	2	2003–2005	107	3,747	239	625	1,338	35.0	2.2	5.8	12.5	
Alfonzo McKinnie	F	Green Bay	1	2019–2020	40	593	113	14	182	14.8	2.8	0.4	4.6	
McCoy McLemore	F/C	Drake	1	1970–1971	58	1,839	463	176	678	31.7	8.0	3.0	11.7	
Jordan McRae	G	Tennessee	2	2015–2017	52	497	53	34	223	9.6	1.0	0.7	4.3	
Sam Merrill^{x}	G	Utah State	4	2022–2026	189	3,906	419	346	1,682	20.7	2.2	1.8	8.9	
Chris Mihm	C	Texas	4	2000–2004	207	4,025	1,043	78	1,475	19.4	5.0	0.4	7.1	
Larry Mikan	F	Minnesota	1	1970–1971	53	536	139	41	158	10.1	2.6	0.8	3.0	
C. J. Miles	G/F	Skyline HS (TX)	2	2012–2014	116	2,348	277	115	1,232	20.2	2.4	1.0	10.6	
Darius Miles	F	East St. Louis HS (IL)	2	2002–2004	104	2,896	530	256	948	27.8	5.1	2.5	9.1	
Andre Miller	G	Utah	3	1999–2002	245	7,964	1,019	2,015	3,545	32.5	4.2	8.2	14.5	
Mike Miller	G/F	Florida	1	2014–2015	52	701	91	46	109	13.5	1.8	0.9	2.1	
Chris Mills	F	Arizona	4	1993–1997	319	11,063	1,707	668	4,006	34.7	5.4	2.1	12.6	
Harold Miner	G	USC	1	1995–1996	19	136	12	8	61	7.2	0.6	0.4	3.2	
Riley Minix^{x}	F	Morehead State	1	2025–2026	6	50	4	4	26	8.3	0.7	0.7	4.3	
Dirk Minniefield	G	Kentucky	2	1985–1987	87	1,253	141	282	444	14.4	1.6	3.2	5.1	
Donovan Mitchell*	G	Louisville	4	2022–2026	264	8,948	1,207	1,386	7,038	33.9	4.6	5.3	26.7	
Mike Mitchell^{+}	F	Auburn	4	1978–1982	271	8,545	1,563	331	5,217	31.5	5.8	1.2	19.3	
Evan Mobley*	F	USC	5	2021–2026	334	10,819	2,994	1,018	5,592	32.4	9.0	3.0	16.7	
Isaiah Mobley	F	USC	2	2022–2024	22	156	30	9	54	7.1	1.4	0.4	2.5	
Jérôme Moïso	F/C	UCLA	1	2004–2005	4	27	7	1	6	6.8	1.8	0.3	1.5	
Paul Mokeski	F/C	Kansas	3	1981–1983; 1989–1990	89	1,333	323	54	370	15.0	3.6	0.6	4.2	
Jamario Moon	F	Meridian CC	2	2009–2011	101	1,816	309	94	485	18.0	3.1	0.9	4.8	
Matt Mooney	G	Texas Tech	1	2019–2020	4	19	3	1	2	4.8	0.8	0.3	0.5	
Lowes Moore	G	West Virginia	1	1981–1982	4	70	4	15	45	17.5	1.0	3.8	11.3	
Marcus Morris Sr.	F	Kansas	1	2023–2024	12	180	25	10	69	15.0	2.1	0.8	5.8	
John Morton	G	Seton Hall	3	1989–1992	107	1,663	142	315	517	15.5	1.3	2.9	4.8	
Timofey Mozgov	C	(Russia) Khimki	2	2014–2016	122	2,474	656	72	961	20.3	5.4	0.6	7.9	
Lamond Murray	F	California	3	1999–2002	223	6,902	1,135	413	3,349	31.0	5.1	1.9	15.0	
Ronald Murray	G	Shaw	1	2005–2006	28	1,027	67	77	377	36.7	2.4	2.8	13.5	

=== N to P ===
All-time roster
Player	Pos.	Pre-draft team	Yrs	Seasons	Statistics									Ref.
Player	Pos.	Pre-draft team	Yrs	Seasons	GP	MP	REB	AST	PTS	MPG	RPG	APG	PPG	Ref.
Lee Nailon	F	TCU	1	2003–2004	22	397	66	17	170	18.0	3.0	0.8	7.7	
Larry Nance^{+} (#22)	F/C	Clemson	7	1987–1994	433	14,966	3,561	1,145	7,257	34.6	8.2	2.6	16.8	
Larry Nance Jr.^{x}	F/C	Wyoming	5	2017–2021; 2025–2026	217	5,306	1,457	503	1,862	24.5	6.7	2.3	8.6	
Pete Nance	F	North Carolina	1	2023–2024	8	27	3	0	3	3.4	0.4	0.0	0.4	
RJ Nembhard	G	TCU	1	2021–2022	14	63	7	12	15	4.5	0.5	0.9	1.1	
Raul Neto	G	(Spain) Gipuzkoa	1	2022–2023	48	505	46	79	157	10.5	1.0	1.6	3.3	
Ira Newble	F	Miami (OH)	5	2003–2008	230	4,209	575	188	963	18.3	2.5	0.8	4.2	
Johnny Newman	G/F	Richmond	2	1986–1987; 1998–1999	109	1,579	145	68	596	14.5	1.3	0.6	5.5	
Malik Newman	G	Kansas	2	2019–2020; 2021–2022	2	12	1	1	10	6.0	0.5	0.5	5.0	
Georges Niang	F	Iowa State	2	2023–2025	133	2,884	467	165	1,213	21.7	3.5	1.2	9.1	
Demetris Nichols	F	Syracuse	1	2007–2008	3	14	1	0	2	4.7	0.3	0.0	0.7	
Carl Nicks	G	Indiana State	1	1982–1983	9	148	26	11	63	16.4	2.9	1.2	7.0	
David Nwaba	G	Cal Poly	1	2018–2019	51	984	163	54	334	19.3	3.2	1.1	6.5	
Chuma Okeke	F	Auburn	1	2024–2025	2	25	4	2	5	12.5	2.0	1.0	2.5	
Isaac Okoro	G/F	Auburn	5	2020–2025	334	8,746	930	536	2,708	26.2	2.8	1.6	8.1	
Jimmy Oliver	G/F	Purdue	1	1991–1992	27	252	27	20	96	9.3	1.0	0.7	3.6	
Kevin Ollie	G	UConn	1	2003–2004	82	1,401	170	234	341	17.1	2.1	2.9	4.2	
Shaquille O'Neal^	C	LSU	1	2009–2010	53	1,240	355	80	636	23.4	6.7	1.5	12.0	
Arinze Onuaku	C	Syracuse	1	2013–2014	2	5	1	0	0	2.5	0.5	0.0	0.0	
Cedi Osman	F	(Turkey) Anadolu Efes	6	2017–2023	404	9,546	1,231	814	3,938	23.6	3.0	2.0	9.7	
Gerald Paddio	G/F	UNLV	1	1990–1991	70	1,181	118	90	504	16.9	1.7	1.3	7.2	
Milt Palacio	G	Colorado State	1	2002–2003	80	1,976	235	259	397	24.7	2.9	3.2	5.0	
Kevin Pangos	G	Gonzaga	1	2021–2022	24	166	11	30	39	6.9	0.5	1.3	1.6	
Jeremy Pargo	G	Gonzaga	1	2012–2013	25	447	32	64	196	17.9	1.3	2.6	7.8	
Anthony Parker	G	Bradley	3	2009–2012	204	5,660	587	495	1,562	27.7	2.9	2.4	7.7	
Smush Parker	G	Fordham	1	2002–2003	66	1,103	119	162	408	16.7	1.8	2.5	6.2	
Steve Patterson	C	UCLA	5	1971–1976	298	4,800	1,432	372	1,388	16.1	4.8	1.2	4.7	
Aleksandar Pavlović	G/F	(Serbia and Montenegro) Budućnost Podgorica	5	2004–2009	302	5,450	564	333	1,843	18.0	1.9	1.1	6.1	
Cameron Payne	G	Murray State	1	2018–2019	9	176	19	23	74	19.6	2.1	2.6	8.2	
Kendrick Perkins	C	Beaumont HS (TX)	2	2014–2015; 2017–2018	18	182	42	10	47	10.1	2.3	0.6	2.6	
London Perrantes	G	Virginia	1	2017–2018	14	66	4	5	7	4.7	0.3	0.4	0.5	
Wesley Person	G	Auburn	5	1997–2002	328	10,347	1,196	651	3,924	31.5	3.6	2.0	12.0	
Roger Phegley	G/F	Bradley	2	1980–1982	109	2,835	317	237	1,428	26.0	2.9	2.2	13.1	
Bobby Phills	G	Southern	6	1991–1997	334	9,140	1,008	831	3,517	27.4	3.0	2.5	10.5	
Scot Pollard	C	Kansas	1	2006–2007	24	109	31	3	24	4.5	1.3	0.1	1.0	
Ben Poquette	F/C	Central Michigan	4	1983–1987	248	4,447	1,105	234	1,236	17.9	4.5	0.9	5.0	
Craig Porter Jr.^{x}	G	Wichita State	3	2023–2026	166	2,310	396	394	762	13.9	2.4	2.4	4.6	
Kevin Porter Jr.	G	USC	1	2019–2020	50	1,162	162	109	498	23.2	3.2	2.2	10.0	
Vitaly Potapenko	C	Wright State	3	1996–1999	177	3,117	624	113	1,178	17.6	3.5	0.6	6.7	
Leon Powe	F	California	2	2009–2011	34	423	99	2	149	12.4	2.9	0.1	4.4	
A. J. Price	G	UConn	1	2014–2015	11	87	15	13	22	7.9	1.4	1.2	2.0	
Mark Price^{+} (#25)	G	Georgia Tech	9	1986–1995	582	18,127	1,533	4,206	9,543	31.1	2.6	7.2	16.4	
Taurean Prince	G	Baylor	1	2020–2021	29	687	108	69	292	23.7	3.7	2.4	10.1	
Tyrese Proctor^{x}	G	Duke	1	2025–2026	50	545	64	74	272	10.9	1.3	1.5	5.4	

=== Q to R ===
All-time roster
Player	Pos.	Pre-draft team	Yrs	Seasons	Statistics									Ref.
Player	Pos.	Pre-draft team	Yrs	Seasons	GP	MP	REB	AST	PTS	MPG	RPG	APG	PPG	Ref.
Chris Quinn	G	Notre Dame	1	2012–2013	7	78	2	9	10	11.1	0.3	1.3	1.4	
Luther Rackley	C	Xavier	2	1970–1972	83	1,499	415	69	582	18.1	5.0	0.8	7.0	
J. R. Reid	F	North Carolina	1	2000–2001	6	39	8	1	10	6.5	1.3	0.2	1.7	
Kevin Restani	F/C	San Francisco	1	1981–1982	34	338	77	15	53	9.9	2.3	0.4	1.6	
Jackie Ridgle	G	California	1	1971–1972	32	107	15	7	57	3.3	0.5	0.2	1.8	
Rick Roberson	F/C	Cincinnati	2	1971–1973	125	4,334	1,494	243	1,604	34.7	12.0	1.9	12.8	
Fred Roberts	F/C	BYU	1	1994–1995	21	223	34	8	80	10.6	1.6	0.4	3.8	
Cliff Robinson	F	USC	3	1981–1984	180	5,949	1,896	379	3,177	33.1	10.5	2.1	17.7	
Larry Robinson	G/F	Centenary	1	2000–2001	1	1	0	0	0	1.0	0.0	0.0	0.0	
Bill Robinzine	F	DePaul	1	1980–1981	8	84	13	5	33	10.5	1.6	0.6	4.1	
Dave Robisch	F/C	Kansas	2	1979–1981	93	3,042	743	236	1,358	32.7	8.0	2.5	14.6	
Johnny Rogers	F/C	UC Irvine	1	1987–1988	24	168	27	3	62	7.0	1.1	0.1	2.6	
Tree Rollins	C	Clemson	2	1988–1990	108	1,257	292	43	261	11.6	2.7	0.4	2.4	
Rajon Rondo	G	Kentucky	1	2021–2022	21	409	59	103	131	19.5	2.8	4.9	6.2	
Derrick Rose	G	Memphis	1	2017–2018	16	308	29	26	157	19.3	1.8	1.6	9.8	
Ricky Rubio	G	(Spain) Joventut Badalona	2	2021–2023	67	1,536	211	340	616	22.9	3.1	5.1	9.2	
Bob Rule	F/C	Colorado State	2	1972–1974	75	980	209	84	326	13.1	2.8	1.1	4.3	
Campy Russell^{+}	F	Michigan	7	1974–1980; 1984–1985	410	11,558	2,107	1,143	6,588	28.2	5.1	2.8	16.1	

=== S ===
All-time roster
Player	Pos.	Pre-draft team	Yrs	Seasons	Statistics									Ref.
Player	Pos.	Pre-draft team	Yrs	Seasons	GP	MP	REB	AST	PTS	MPG	RPG	APG	PPG	Ref.
Samardo Samuels	F	Louisville	3	2010–2013	109	1,722	366	45	638	15.8	3.4	0.4	5.9	
Larry Sanders	F/C	VCU	1	2016–2017	5	13	4	0	4	2.6	0.8	0.0	0.8	
Mike Sanders	G/F	UCLA	4	1987–1989; 1991–1993	180	4,260	612	276	1,574	23.7	3.4	1.5	8.7	
Olivier Sarr^{x}	C	Kentucky	1	2025–2026	4	39	11	5	14	9.8	2.8	1.3	3.5	
Dennis Schröder^{x}	G	(Germany) Phantoms Braunschweig	1	2025–2026	30	641	68	130	246	21.4	2.3	4.3	8.2	
Shawnelle Scott	C	St. John's	2	1996–1998	57	238	75	8	64	4.2	1.3	0.1	1.1	
Trevon Scott	F	Cincinnati	1	2021–2022	2	11	2	0	6	5.5	1.0	0.0	3.0	
Ramon Sessions	G	Nevada	2	2010–2012	122	3,139	382	631	1,505	25.7	3.1	5.2	12.3	
Collin Sexton	G	Alabama	4	2018–2022	218	7,179	663	720	4,356	32.9	3.0	3.3	20.0	
Lonnie Shelton	F/C	Oregon State	3	1983–1986	180	4,027	791	336	1,415	22.4	4.4	1.9	7.9	
Iman Shumpert	G	Georgia Tech	4	2014–2018	182	4,449	605	275	1,212	24.4	3.3	1.5	6.7	
James Silas	G	Stephen F. Austin	1	1981–1982	67	1,447	109	222	748	21.6	1.6	3.3	11.2	
Cedric Simmons	F	NC State	1	2007–2008	7	68	15	0	4	9.7	2.1	0.0	0.6	
Kobi Simmons	G	Arizona	1	2018–2019	1	2	0	0	0	2.0	0.0	0.0	0.0	
Henry Sims	C	Georgetown	1	2013–2014	20	168	56	5	44	8.4	2.8	0.3	2.2	
Brian Skinner	F	Baylor	1	2001–2002	65	1,107	281	17	224	17.0	4.3	0.3	3.4	
Donald Sloan	G	Texas A&M	2	2011–2013	45	865	87	129	246	19.2	1.9	2.9	5.5	
Bingo Smith (#7)	G/F	Tulsa	10	1970–1980	720	19,221	3,057	1,566	9,513	26.7	4.2	2.2	13.2	
Elmore Smith	C	Kentucky State	3	1976–1979	141	3,003	1,015	83	1,477	21.3	7.2	0.6	10.5	
J. R. Smith	G/F	Saint Benedict's Prep. (NJ)	5	2014–2019	255	7,476	743	468	2,628	29.3	2.9	1.8	10.3	
Joe Smith	F	Maryland	2	2007–2009	48	991	236	35	355	20.6	4.9	0.7	7.4	
Randy Smith	G/F	Buffalo State	2	1979–1981	164	4,876	449	720	2,635	29.7	2.7	4.4	16.1	
Robert Smith	G	UNLV	2	1980–1981; 1984–1985	8	68	7	10	24	8.5	0.9	1.3	3.0	
Willie Smith	G	Missouri	1	1979–1980	62	1,051	121	259	299	17.0	2.0	4.2	4.8	
Eric Snow	G	Michigan State	4	2004–2008	267	6,429	561	1,035	1,077	24.1	2.1	3.9	4.0	
Dick Snyder	G/F	Davidson	4	1974–1978	304	7,209	634	717	3,237	23.7	2.1	2.4	10.6	
Dave Sorenson	F	Ohio State	3	1970–1973	165	3,231	824	249	1,449	19.6	5.0	1.5	8.8	
Marreese Speights	F/C	Florida	1	2012–2013	39	721	197	29	396	18.5	5.1	0.7	10.2	
Ryan Stack	F	South Carolina	2	1998–2000	43	397	79	10	99	9.2	1.8	0.2	2.3	
Nik Stauskas	G	Michigan	1	2018–2019	24	342	47	19	132	14.3	2.0	0.8	5.5	
Lamar Stevens	F	Penn State	3	2020–2023	165	2,634	467	102	876	16.0	2.8	0.6	5.3	
Michael Stewart	C	California	2	2002–2004	55	327	73	6	44	5.9	1.3	0.1	0.8	
Bryant Stith	G	Virginia	1	2001–2002	50	665	85	42	208	13.3	1.7	0.8	4.2	
Max Strus^{x}	F	DePaul	3	2023–2026	132	3,800	620	465	1,458	28.8	4.7	3.5	11.0	
Gary Suiter	F/C	Midwestern State	1	1970–1971	30	140	41	2	42	4.7	1.4	0.1	1.4	
Bruno Šundov	C	(Croatia) Split	1	2003–2004	4	29	10	0	9	7.3	2.5	0.0	2.3	
Bob Sura	G	Florida State	5	1995–2000	330	7,418	927	1,230	2,667	22.5	2.8	3.7	8.1	
Wally Szczerbiak	F	Miami (OH)	2	2007–2009	99	2,083	313	117	722	21.0	3.2	1.2	7.3	

=== T to V ===
All-time roster
Player	Pos.	Pre-draft team	Yrs	Seasons	Statistics									Ref.
Player	Pos.	Pre-draft team	Yrs	Seasons	GP	MP	REB	AST	PTS	MPG	RPG	APG	PPG	Ref.
Earl Tatum	G/F	Marquette	1	1979–1980	33	225	26	20	85	6.8	0.8	0.6	2.6	
Edy Tavares	C	(Spain) Gran Canaria	1	2016–2017	1	24	10	1	6	24.0	10.0	1.0	6.0	
Sebastian Telfair	G	Abraham Lincoln HS (NY)	1	2009–2010	4	77	4	12	39	19.3	1.0	3.0	9.8	
Billy Thomas	G	Kansas	1	2007–2008	7	34	2	0	12	4.9	0.3	0.0	1.7	
Brodric Thomas	G	Truman State	1	2020–2021	28	375	49	26	115	13.4	1.8	0.9	4.1	
Carl Thomas	G	Eastern Michigan	2	1996–1998	48	349	50	17	98	7.3	1.0	0.4	2.0	
Isaiah Thomas	G	Washington	1	2017–2018	15	406	31	68	221	27.1	2.1	4.5	14.7	
Mychel Thompson	G	Pepperdine	1	2011–2012	5	95	5	7	18	19.0	1.0	1.4	3.6	
Paul Thompson	G/F	Tulane	2	1983–1985	115	2,446	428	180	1,089	21.3	3.7	1.6	9.5	
Tristan Thompson	F/C	Texas	11	2011–2020; 2023–2025	708	18,249	5,701	699	6,069	25.8	8.1	1.0	8.6	
JT Thor	F	Auburn	1	2024–2025	9	42	6	1	28	4.7	0.7	0.1	3.1	
Nate Thurmond^ (#42)	F/C	Bowling Green	2	1975–1977	114	2,130	718	151	566	18.7	6.3	1.3	5.0	
Darren Tillis	F/C	Cleveland State	1	1982–1983	37	482	121	16	152	13.0	3.3	0.4	4.1	
Nae'Qwan Tomlin^{x}	F	Memphis	2	2024–2026	69	1,067	207	55	410	15.5	3.0	0.8	5.9	
Sedric Toney	G	Dayton	1	1993–1994	12	64	3	11	6	5.3	0.3	0.9	0.5	
Luke Travers	G	(Australia) Perth Wildcats	2	2024–2026	24	191	44	17	40	8.0	1.8	0.7	1.7	
Robert Traylor	F	Michigan	2	2000–2001; 2004–2005	144	2,539	632	124	811	17.6	4.4	0.9	5.6	
Jeff Trepagnier	G	USC	1	2001–2002	12	77	12	12	18	6.4	1.0	1.0	1.5	
Melvin Turpin	C	Kentucky	3	1984–1987	223	5,042	1,198	124	2,325	22.6	5.4	0.6	10.4	
Jaylon Tyson^{x}	G	California	2	2024–2026	113	2,230	434	191	1,039	19.7	3.8	1.7	9.2	
Ben Uzoh	G	Tulsa	1	2011–2012	2	13	4	2	4	6.5	2.0	1.0	2.0	
Darnell Valentine	G	Kansas	2	1988–1989; 1990–1991	142	2,927	275	525	975	20.6	1.9	3.7	6.9	
Denzel Valentine	G/F	Michigan State	1	2021–2022	22	204	38	11	64	9.3	1.7	0.5	2.9	
Anderson Varejão	F/C	(Spain) Barcelona	13	2004–2016; 2020–2021	596	14,809	4,454	712	4,498	24.8	7.5	1.2	7.5	
Gary Voce	F	Notre Dame	1	1989–1990	1	4	2	0	2	4.0	2.0	0.0	2.0	

=== W to Z ===
All-time roster
Player	Pos.	Pre-draft team	Yrs	Seasons	Statistics									Ref.
Player	Pos.	Pre-draft team	Yrs	Seasons	GP	MP	REB	AST	PTS	MPG	RPG	APG	PPG	Ref.
Dean Wade^{x}	F	Kansas State	7	2019–2026	342	6,832	1,248	372	1,824	20.0	3.6	1.1	5.3	
Dwyane Wade^	G	Marquette	1	2017–2018	46	1,069	181	163	513	23.2	3.9	3.5	11.2	
Dajuan Wagner	G	Memphis	3	2002–2005	102	2,195	142	194	960	21.5	1.4	1.9	9.4	
Dion Waiters	G	Syracuse	3	2012–2015	164	4,614	401	466	2,352	28.1	2.4	2.8	14.3	
Foots Walker	G	West Georgia	6	1974–1980	427	10,237	1,267	2,115	3,073	24.0	3.0	5.0	7.2	
Ben Wallace^	F/C	Virginia Union	2	2007–2009	78	1,892	525	57	258	24.3	6.7	0.7	3.3	
Luke Walton	F	Arizona	2	2011–2013	71	1,156	180	196	215	16.3	2.5	2.8	3.0	
Cornell Warner	F/C	Jackson State	2	1972–1974	73	1,372	524	70	398	18.8	7.2	1.0	5.5	
John Warren	G/F	St. John's	4	1970–1974	259	4,659	647	534	1,702	18.0	2.5	2.1	6.6	
Bobby Washington	G	Eastern Kentucky	2	1970–1972	116	1,790	234	413	700	15.4	2.0	3.6	6.0	
Richard Washington	F/C	UCLA	2	1980–1982	87	1,818	444	128	790	20.9	5.1	1.5	9.1	
Clarence Weatherspoon	F	Southern Miss	1	2000–2001	82	2,774	796	103	924	33.8	9.7	1.3	11.3	
Scott Wedman	G/F	Colorado	2	1981–1983	89	2,928	512	219	1,225	32.9	5.8	2.5	13.8	
Jiří Welsch	G	(Slovenia) Union Olimpija	1	2004–2005	16	192	28	19	46	12.0	1.8	1.2	2.9	
David Wesley	G	Baylor	1	2006–2007	35	352	35	37	73	10.1	1.0	1.1	2.1	
Walt Wesley	C	Kansas	3	1970–1973	176	4,720	1,462	166	2,511	26.8	8.3	0.9	14.3	
Delonte West	G	Saint Joseph's	3	2007–2010	150	4,458	469	538	1,547	29.7	3.1	3.6	10.3	
Mark West	F/C	Old Dominion	5	1984–1988; 1996–1997	334	5,529	1,378	145	1,726	16.6	4.1	0.4	5.2	
Ennis Whatley	G	Alabama	1	1985–1986	8	66	7	13	22	8.3	0.9	1.6	2.8	
Jerome Whitehead	F/C	Marquette	1	1980–1981	3	8	3	0	2	2.7	1.0	0.0	0.7	
Lenny Wilkens^	G	Providence	2	1972–1974	149	5,456	623	1,150	2,751	36.6	4.2	7.7	18.5	
Bob Wilkerson	G/F	Indiana	2	1981–1983	142	3,507	492	426	1,235	24.7	3.5	3.0	8.7	
Gerald Wilkins	G/F	Chattanooga	2	1992–1994	162	4,847	517	438	2,060	29.9	3.2	2.7	12.7	
Mike Wilks	G	Rice	1	2005–2006	37	243	27	18	42	6.6	0.7	0.5	1.1	
Chuckie Williams	G	Kansas State	1	1976–1977	22	65	4	7	37	3.0	0.2	0.3	1.7	
Deron Williams	G	Illinois	1	2016–2017	24	486	45	86	179	20.3	1.9	3.6	7.5	
Derrick Williams	F	Arizona	1	2016–2017	25	427	57	14	156	17.1	2.3	0.6	6.2	
Eric Williams	F	Providence	1	2003–2004	50	1,373	191	95	469	27.5	3.8	1.9	9.4	
Hot Rod Williams	F/C	Tulane	9	1986–1995	661	20,802	4,669	1,366	8,504	31.5	7.1	2.1	12.9	
Jawad Williams	F	North Carolina	3	2008–2011	90	1,153	133	56	340	12.8	1.5	0.6	3.8	
Kevin Williams	G	St. John's	1	1984–1985	46	413	63	61	163	9.0	1.4	1.3	3.5	
Mo Williams^{+}	G	Alabama	4	2008–2011; 2015–2016	227	7,006	654	1,052	3,350	30.9	2.9	4.6	14.8	
Reggie Williams	G/F	Georgetown	1	1989–1990	32	542	60	38	218	16.9	1.9	1.2	6.8	
Scott Williams	F/C	North Carolina	1	2004–2005	19	152	30	8	33	8.0	1.6	0.4	1.7	
Bill Willoughby	F/C	Dwight Morrow HS (NJ)	1	1979–1980	78	1,447	329	72	535	18.6	4.2	0.9	6.9	
Mike Wilson	G	Marquette	1	1984–1985	11	175	18	24	77	15.9	1.6	2.2	7.0	
Dylan Windler	G/F	Belmont	3	2020–2023	84	982	196	68	276	11.7	2.3	0.8	3.3	
Luke Witte	C	Ohio State	3	1973–1976	118	1,098	357	60	372	9.3	3.0	0.5	3.2	
Mike Woodson	G/F	Indiana	1	1990–1991	4	46	2	5	11	11.5	0.5	1.3	2.8	
Lorenzen Wright	F/C	Memphis	1	2008–2009	17	125	25	3	23	7.4	1.5	0.2	1.4	
Tyler Zeller	F/C	North Carolina	2	2012–2014	147	3,082	720	132	1,009	21.0	4.9	0.9	6.9	
Ante Žižić	F/C	(Croatia) Cibona	2	2017–2020	113	1,517	446	64	674	13.4	3.9	0.6	6.0	
