= 1977–78 Florida State Seminoles men's basketball team =

American college basketball season

1977–78 Florida State Seminoles men's basketball

Metro Conference Regular Season Champions

NCAA tournament
- Conference: Metro Conference (1975–1995)

Ranking
- Coaches: No. 12
- AP: No. 15
- Record: 23–6 (12–1 Metro)
- Head coach: Hugh Durham (12th season)
- Assistant coaches: Larry Gay; Morris McHone; John Sodec
- Home arena: Tully Gymnasium

1977–78 Metro Conference men's basketball standings
	Conf.				Overall
Team	W		L	PCT	W		L	PCT
No. 15 Florida State	12	–	1	.923	23	–	6	.793
No. 9 Louisville †	9	–	3	.750	23	–	7	.767
Memphis State	7	–	5	.583	19	–	9	.679
Cincinnati	6	–	6	.500	17	–	10	.630
Georgia Tech	6	–	6	.500	15	–	12	.556
Saint Louis	2	–	10	.167	7	–	20	.259
Tulane	1	–	12	.077	5	–	22	.185
† 1978 Metro Conference tournament winner Rankings from AP Poll

The 1977–78 Florida State Seminoles men's basketball team represented the Florida State University during the 1977–78 NCAA Division I men's basketball season.

== Roster ==
1977–78 Florida State Seminoles men's basketball team
Players
Coaches

Pos.	#	Name	Height	Weight	Year	Hometown
F	3	Ron Ealy	—	—
F	10	David Thompson	6 ft 8 in (2.03 m)	195 lb (88 kg)	Sr	Boston, Massachusetts
G	11	Bobby Parks	6 ft 0 in (1.83 m)	165 lb (75 kg)	Fr	Clearwater, Florida
G	12	Jerry Cox	6 ft 4 in (1.93 m)	175 lb (79 kg)	Jr	Indianapolis, Indiana
F	14	Hank Mann	6 ft 5 in (1.96 m)	185 lb (84 kg)	RS Jr	Chester, Pennsylvania
F	20	James Bozeman	6 ft 5 in (1.96 m)	190 lb (86 kg)	Fr	Tallahassee, Florida
G	22	Mickey Dillard	6 ft 2 in (1.88 m)	160 lb (73 kg)	Fr	Dania, Florida
G	23	Tony Jackson	6 ft 0 in (1.83 m)	160 lb (73 kg)	So	Lexington, Kentucky
F	24	Jim Smith	6 ft 6 in (1.98 m)	210 lb (95 kg)	RS Sr	Lake Worth, Florida
G	32	Eugene Harris	6 ft 0 in (1.83 m)	180 lb (82 kg)	RS Sr	Scottsboro, Alabama
C	33	Donnie Kuhl	6 ft 9 in (2.06 m)	220 lb (100 kg)	So	Orlando, Florida
F	34	Murray Brown	6 ft 7 in (2.01 m)	190 lb (86 kg)	So	Tampa, Florida
F/C	42	Harry Davis	6 ft 7 in (2.01 m)	220 lb (100 kg)	Sr	Cleveland, Ohio
F/C	43	Kris Anderson	6 ft 8 in (2.03 m)	205 lb (93 kg)	So	Yulee, Florida

Head coach

- Hugh Durham

Assistant coach(es)

- Larry Gay
- Morris McHone
- John Sodec

Legend

- (C) Team captain
- (S) Suspended
- (I) Ineligible
- (W) Walk-on
- Injured
- Current redshirt

== Schedule ==
Date time, TV	Rank^{#}	Opponent^{#}	Result	Record	Site city, state
Regular season
Nov 28, 1977*; 8:05 p.m.		Rollins College	W 83–59	1–0	Tully Gymnasium (1,304); Tallahassee, Florida
Dec 1, 1977*; 8:05 p.m.		Troy State	W 110–82	2–0	Tully Gymnasium (1,167); Tallahassee, Florida
Dec 5, 1977*		Saint Leo	W 90–49	3–0	Tully Gymnasium (1,018); Tallahassee, Florida
Dec 9, 1977*		vs. South Florida; Big Sun Tournament	W 76–67	4–0	Bayfront Center (4,800); Saint Petersburg, Florida
Dec 10, 1977*		vs. Seton Hall; Big Sun Tournament	W 94–63	5–0	Bayfront Center (3,500); Saint Petersburg, Florida
Dec 16, 1977*		vs. Texas A&M; Birmingham Classic	W 100–77	6–0	Birmingham–Jefferson Civic Center (2,300); Birmingham, Alabama
Dec 17, 1977*		vs. Navy; Birmingham Classic	W 82–55	7–0	Birmingham–Jefferson Civic Center (2,000); Birmingham, Alabama
Dec 23, 1977*		vs. Missouri	W 97–64	8–0	Harold & Ted Alfond Sports Center (2,000); Orlando, Florida
Dec 27, 1977	No. 18	at No. 11 Cincinnati	L 75–77	8–1 (0–1)	Riverfront Coliseum (8,921); Cincinnati, Ohio
Dec 30, 1977	No. 18	vs. Tulane; Pillsbury Holiday Classic	W 71–56	9–1 (1–1)	Met Center (12,513); Bloomington, Minnesota
Dec 31, 1977*	No. 18	at Minnesota; Pillsbury Holiday Classic Championship	L 74–88	9–2	Met Center (7,707); Bloomington, Minnesota
Jan 7, 1978		at Tulane	W 87–85	10–2 (2–1)	Avron B. Fogelman Arena (1,500); New Orleans, Louisiana
Jan 11, 1978*		Fairleigh Dickinson	W 85–43	11–2	Tully Gymnasium (1,640); Tallahassee, Florida
Jan 14, 1978*		Tulane	W 103–85	12–2 (3–1)	Tully Gymnasium (2,928); Tallahassee, Florida
Jan 17, 1978		Cincinnati	W 76–66	13–2 (4–1)	Tully Gymnasium (3,607); Tallahassee, Florida
Jan 22, 1978		at No. 9 Louisville	W 70–66	14–2 (5–1)	Freedom Hall (14,954); Louisville, Kentucky
Jan 26, 1978	No. 17	Saint Louis	W 88–75	15–2 (6–1)	Tully Gymnasium (2,513); Tallahassee, Florida
Feb 2, 1978*	No. 15	South Alabama	L 56–58	15–3	Tully Gymnasium (2,136); Tallahassee, Florida
Feb 4, 1978	No. 15	at Saint Louis	W 72–68	16–3 (7–1)	Kiel Auditorium (3,743); St. Louis, Missouri
Feb 6, 1978	No. 15	at Memphis State	W 95–89	17–3 (8–1)	Mid-South Coliseum (11,200); Memphis, Tennessee
Feb 11, 1978	No. 16	Memphis State	W 89–82	18–3 (9–1)	Tully Gymnasium (3,910); Tallahassee, Florida
Feb 13, 1978*	No. 16	at UNC Charlotte	L 79–88	18–4	Charlotte Coliseum (9,625); Charlotte, North Carolina
Feb 17, 1978	No. 14	No. 9 Louisville	W 81–70	19–4 (10–1)	Tully Gymnasium (4,296); Tallahassee, Florida
Feb 21, 1978	No. 12	Georgia Tech	W 78–72	20–4 (11–1)	Tully Gymnasium (2,850); Tallahassee, Florida
Feb 25, 1978	No. 12	at Georgia Tech	W 85–82	21–4 (12–1)	Alexander Memorial Coliseum (6,273); Atlanta, Georgia
Feb 27, 1978*	No. 12	at Oral Roberts	W 80–76 ^{OT}	22–4	Mabee Center (9,567); Tulsa, Oklahoma
Metro tournament
Mar 3, 1978*	(1) No. 11	vs. (4) Georgia Tech; Semifinals	W 71–69	23–4	Riverfront Coliseum (10,618); Cincinnati, Ohio
Mar 4, 1978*	(1) No. 11	vs. (2) No. 20 Louisville; Championship game	L 93–94	23–5	Riverfront Coliseum (10,267); Cincinnati, Ohio
NCAA Tournament
Mar 11, 1978*	(ME 4L) No. 13	vs. (ME 2Q) No. 1 Kentucky; First round	L 76–85	23–6	Stokely Athletic Center (12,700); Knoxville, Tennessee
*Non-conference game. ^{#}Rankings from AP poll. (#) Tournament seedings in parentheses. ME=Mideast. All times are in Eastern Time.

== Awards and honors ==
- Harry Davis – Metro Conference co-Player of the Year
- Hugh Durham – Metro Conference Coach of the Year
