= 1977–78 Louisville Cardinals men's basketball team =

American college basketball season

1977–78 Louisville Cardinals men's basketball

Metro Conference Champions

NCAA tournament, Sweet Sixteen
- Conference: Metro Conference (1975–1995)

Ranking
- Coaches: No. 9
- AP: No. 14
- Record: 23–7 (9–3 Metro)
- Head coach: Denny Crum (7th season)
- Assistant coaches: Bill Olsen; Wade Houston; Jerry Jones
- Home arena: Freedom Hall

1977–78 Metro Conference men's basketball standings
	Conf.				Overall
Team	W		L	PCT	W		L	PCT
No. 15 Florida State	12	–	1	.923	23	–	6	.793
No. 9 Louisville †	9	–	3	.750	23	–	7	.767
Memphis State	7	–	5	.583	19	–	9	.679
Cincinnati	6	–	6	.500	17	–	10	.630
Georgia Tech	6	–	6	.500	15	–	12	.556
Saint Louis	2	–	10	.167	7	–	20	.259
Tulane	1	–	12	.077	5	–	22	.185
† 1978 Metro Conference tournament winner Rankings from AP Poll

The 1977–78 Louisville Cardinals men's basketball team represented the University of Louisville during the 1977–78 NCAA Division I men's basketball season, Louisville's 64th season of intercollegiate competition. The Cardinals competed in the Metro Conference and were coached by Denny Crum. The team played home games at Freedom Hall.

The team completed a 23–7 record and reached the Sweet Sixteen of the 1978 NCAA Tournament.

== Roster ==
1977–78 Louisville Cardinals men's basketball team
Players
Coaches

Pos.	#	Name	Height	Weight	Year	Previous school	Hometown
C	13	Ricky Gallon	6 ft 11 in (2.11 m)	—	Sr	Tampa, Florida
G	23	Tony Branch	6 ft 0 in (1.83 m)	175 lb (79 kg)	So	Elston	Michigan City, Indiana
F	24	Daryl Cleveland	6 ft 7 in (2.01 m)	190 lb (86 kg)	Fr	Thomas County Central	Thomasville, Georgia
G	34	Roger Burkman	6 ft 5 in (1.96 m)	175 lb (79 kg)	Fr	Franklin Central	Indianapolis, Indiana
G	35	Darrell Griffith	6 ft 4 in (1.93 m)	190 lb (86 kg)	So	Louisville Male	Louisville, Kentucky
G	42	Rick Wilson	6 ft 5 in (1.96 m)	195 lb (88 kg)	Sr	Atherton	Louisville, Kentucky

Head coach

- Denny Crum (UCLA)

Assistant coach(es)

- Jerry Jones
- Bill Olsen
- Wade Houston

Legend

- (C) Team captain
- (S) Suspended
- (I) Ineligible
- (W) Walk-on
- Injured
- Current redshirt

== Schedule and results ==
Date time, TV	Rank^{#}	Opponent^{#}	Result	Record	Site city, state
Regular season
Nov 30, 1977*	No. 9	at Providence	L 51–57	0–1	Providence Civic Center; Providence, Rhode Island
Dec 3, 1977*		Vanderbilt	W 96–66	1–1	Freedom Hall; Louisville, Kentucky
Dec 7, 1977*		at No. 9 Michigan	W 88–85	2–1	Crisler Arena; Ann Arbor, Michigan
Dec 10, 1977*		Robert Morris	W 104–68	3–1	Freedom Hall; Louisville, Kentucky
Dec 13, 1977*		No. 17 Purdue	W 68–66	4–1	Freedom Hall; Louisville, Kentucky
Dec 19, 1977*		Dayton	W 69–63	5–1	Freedom Hall; Louisville, Kentucky
Dec 22, 1977*		No. 2 Marquette	W 61–60	6–1	Freedom Hall (16,433); Louisville, Kentucky
Dec 28, 1977*	No. 7	La Salle; Louisville Classic	W 113–85	7–1	Freedom Hall; Louisville, Kentucky
Dec 29, 1977*		Georgia	L 70–73	7–2	Freedom Hall; Louisville, Kentucky
Jan 3, 1978		at Memphis State	W 78–75	8–2 (1–0)	Mid-South Coliseum; Memphis, Tennessee
Jan 7, 1978		at Cincinnati	W 78–75	9–2 (2–0)	Riverfront Coliseum; Cincinnati, Ohio
Jan 14, 1978		Georgia Tech	W 90–84	10–2 (3–0)	Freedom Hall; Louisville, Kentucky
Jan 18, 1978*		Southwestern Louisiana	W 78–75	11–2	Freedom Hall; Louisville, Kentucky
Jan 22, 1978	No. 9	Florida State	L 66–70	11–3 (3–1)	Freedom Hall (14,954); Louisville, Kentucky
Jan 26, 1978		at Tulane	W 105–82	12–3 (4–1)	Avron B. Fogelman Arena; New Orleans, Louisiana
Feb 1, 1978*		at Marshall	W 85–69	13–3	Veterans Memorial Fieldhouse; Huntington, West Virginia
Feb 4, 1978		Cincinnati	W 83–76	14–3 (5–1)	Freedom Hall; Louisville, Kentucky
Feb 7, 1978		Tulane	W 115–86	15–3 (6–1)	Freedom Hall; Louisville, Kentucky
Feb 11, 1978		at Saint Louis	W 63–61	16–3 (7–1)	Kiel Auditorium; St. Louis, Missouri
Feb 14, 1978		at Georgia Tech	L 59–69	16–4 (7–2)	Alexander Memorial Coliseum; Atlanta, Georgia
Feb 17, 1978	No. 9	at No. 14 Florida State	L 70–81	16–5 (7–3)	Tully Gymnasium (4,296); Tallahassee, Florida
Feb 19, 1978*		at Minnesota	L 71–72	16–6	Williams Arena; Minneapolis, Minnesota
Feb 23, 1978*		Ball State	W 104–84	17–6	Freedom Hall; Louisville, Kentucky
Feb 25, 1978*		Memphis State	W 115–97	18–6 (8–3)	Freedom Hall; Louisville, Kentucky
Feb 27, 1978		Saint Louis	W 94–59	19–6 (9–3)	Freedom Hall; Louisville, Kentucky
Metro Conference Tournament
Mar 2, 1978*	(2) No. 20	vs. (7) Tulane; Quarterfinals	W 93–64	20–6	Riverfront Coliseum; Cincinnati, Ohio
Mar 3, 1978*	(2) No. 20	vs. (3) Memphis State; Semifinals	W 67–62	21–6	Riverfront Coliseum; Cincinnati, Ohio
Mar 4, 1978*	(2) No. 20	vs. (1) No. 11 Florida State; Championship game	W 94–93	22–6	Riverfront Coliseum (10,267); Cincinnati, Ohio
NCAA Tournament
Mar 12, 1978*	(MW 2Q) No. 9	vs. (MW 4L) St. John's; First round	W 76–68	23–6	Mabee Center; Tulsa, Oklahoma
Mar 17, 1978*	(MW 2Q) No. 9	vs. (MW 1L) No. 3 DePaul; Midwest Regional Semifinals – Sweet Sixteen	L 89–90 ^{2OT}	23–7	Allen Fieldhouse; Lawrence, Kansas
*Non-conference game. ^{#}Rankings from AP poll. (#) Tournament seedings in parentheses. MW=Midwest. All times are in Eastern.
