= 1978 Metro Conference men's basketball tournament =

- Classification: Division I
- Season: 1977–78
- Teams: 7
- Site: Riverfront Coliseum; Cincinnati, OH
- Champions: Louisville (1st title)
- Winning coach: Denny Crum (1st title)
- MVP: Rick Wilson (Louisville)

1977–78 Metro Conference men's basketball standings
	Conf.				Overall
Team	W		L	PCT	W		L	PCT
No. 15 Florida State	12	–	1	.923	23	–	6	.793
No. 9 Louisville †	9	–	3	.750	23	–	7	.767
Memphis State	7	–	5	.583	19	–	9	.679
Cincinnati	6	–	6	.500	17	–	10	.630
Georgia Tech	6	–	6	.500	15	–	12	.556
Saint Louis	2	–	10	.167	7	–	20	.259
Tulane	1	–	12	.077	5	–	22	.185
† 1978 Metro Conference tournament winner Rankings from AP Poll

The 1978 Metro Conference men's basketball tournament was held March 2–4 at the Riverfront Coliseum in Cincinnati, Ohio.

Louisville defeated top-seeded Florida State in the championship game, 94–93, to win their first Metro men's basketball tournament.

The Cardinals, in turn, received a bid to the 1978 NCAA Tournament. They were joined by fellow Metro member, and tournament runner-up, Florida State, who earned an at-large bid.

== Format ==
All seven of the conference's members participated in the tournament field. They were seeded based on regular season conference records, with the top team earning a bye into the semifinal round. The other six teams entered into the preliminary first round.

== Bracket ==
First round Thursday, March 2
5	Cincinnati	38
4	Georgia Tech	39
3	Memphis State	79
6	Saint Louis	57
7	Tulane	64
2	Louisville	93

Semifinals; Friday, March 3
1	Florida State	71
4	Georgia Tech	69
3	Memphis State	62
2	Louisville	67

Championship; Saturday, March 4
1	Florida State	93
2	Louisville	94
