= 1997–98 Golden State Warriors season =

NBA professional basketball team season

- Head coach: P. J. Carlesimo
- Owners: Chris Cohan
- Arena: The Arena in Oakland

Results
- Record: 19–63 (.232)
- Place: Division: 6th (Pacific); Conference: 12th (Western)
- Playoff finish: Did not qualify
- Stats at Basketball Reference

Local media
- Television: KTVU; KICU-TV; SportsChannel/Fox Sports Bay Area
- Radio: KNBR

The 1997–98 Golden State Warriors season was the 52nd season for the Golden State Warriors in the National Basketball Association, and their 36th season in the San Francisco Bay Area.

== Season summary ==
=== Off-season ===
The Warriors received the eighth overall pick in the 1997 NBA draft, and selected center Adonal Foyle out of Colgate University. After playing their home games at the San Jose Arena the previous season, the team moved back into their renovated arena, which was renamed as The Arena in Oakland. During the off-season, the Warriors acquired second-year center Erick Dampier and Duane Ferrell from the Indiana Pacers, acquired Brian Shaw and David Vaughn from the Orlando Magic, and hired P.J. Carlesimo as their new head coach.

For the season, the Warriors redesigned their primary logo, replacing their traditional golden yellow and blue colors with a different shade of golden yellow, orange, dark navy blue, and light blue to their color scheme of white. The team's primary logo featured a dark navy blue warrior, holding a lightning bolt in front of an orange basketball with dark navy blue seams, and above the team name "Warriors" in golden yellow letters surrounded by orange and dark navy blue outlines. The team also redesigned their home and road uniforms, which featured a dark navy blue, golden yellow and orange trim, and golden yellow lightning streak side panels with dark navy blue and orange outlines on the left side of their jerseys and shorts. The home uniforms remained white, while the road uniforms were changed from royal blue to dark navy blue; both uniforms featured the team's primary logo of a warrior's head on the right leg of their shorts.

The team's new primary logo would remain in use until 2010, while the new uniforms would last until 2002, where they would add orange side panels to their jerseys and shorts.

=== Regular season ===
Early into the regular season, the Warriors traded B. J. Armstrong to the Charlotte Hornets in exchange for Muggsy Bogues, and second-year guard Tony Delk. Under Carlesimo and with the addition of Dampier, Bogues, Shaw and Foyle, the team struggled losing their first nine games, and got off to an awful 1–14 start to the season.

This season was also known for an infamous and controversial incident. On December 1, 1997, All-Star guard Latrell Sprewell choked, and assaulted Carlesimo during practice before being restrained by teammates and assistant coaches, and allegedly returning to attack Carlesimo a second time. Sprewell was first suspended for ten games, but was later on suspended for the remainder of the season, which was 68 games left in the Warriors' schedule at the time. Sprewell averaged 21.4 points, 4.9 assists and 1.4 steals per game in only just 14 games.

Without their star guard, the Warriors showed slight improvement before suffering a 14-game losing streak between December and January, and held a miserable 8–37 record at the All-Star break. At mid-season, the team traded Shaw, and Joe Smith to the Philadelphia 76ers in exchange for Jim Jackson and Clarence Weatherspoon, and traded Vaughn to the Chicago Bulls in exchange for Jason Caffey. Before the trade, Smith averaged 17.3 points and 6.9 rebounds per game in 49 games, while Shaw provided with 6.4 points and 4.4 assists per game in 39 games. The Warriors won their final three games of the season, and finished in sixth place in the Pacific Division with an awful 19–63 record.

Jackson averaged 18.9 points, 5.6 rebounds and 5.1 assists per game in 31 games after the trade, while Donyell Marshall showed improvement becoming the team's starting small forward, averaging 15.4 points, 8.6 rebounds and 1.3 steals per game, and Dampier provided the team with 11.8 points, 8.7 rebounds and 1.7 blocks per game. In addition, Caffey contributed 10.9 points and 5.9 rebounds per game in 29 games, while Weatherspoon averaged 10.7 points, 8.3 rebounds and 1.4 steals per game in 31 games, Delk contributed 10.4 points per game, Bimbo Coles provided with 8.0 points and 4.7 assists per game, but only played 53 games due to hamstring and foot injuries, and Bogues contributed 5.8 points and 5.5 assists per game.

Marshall finished in third place in Most Improved Player voting. The Warriors finished 27th in the NBA in home-game attendance, with an attendance of 444,922 at The Arena in Oakland during the regular season, which was the third-lowest in the league.

=== Aftermath ===
Following the season, Sprewell was traded to the New York Knicks after six seasons with the Warriors, while Jackson signed as a free agent with the Portland Trail Blazers, and Weatherspoon signed with the Miami Heat.

== Offseason ==
=== Draft picks ===
Round	Pick	Player	Position	Nationality	College
1	8	Adonal Foyle	C/PF	United States	Colgate
2	37	Marc Jackson	C	United States	Temple

== Roster ==
1997–98 Golden State Warriors roster
Players

Pos.	No.	Player	Height	Weight	DOB	From
G	1	Muggsy Bogues	5 ft 3 in (1.60 m)	136 lb (62 kg)	1965–01–09	Wake Forest
F	21	Jason Caffey	6 ft 8 in (2.03 m)	255 lb (116 kg)	1973–06–12	Alabama
G	12	Bimbo Coles (injured)	6 ft 1 in (1.85 m)	180 lb (82 kg)	1968–04–22	Virginia Tech
C	35	Erick Dampier	6 ft 11 in (2.11 m)	265 lb (120 kg)	1975–07–14	Mississippi State
G	00	Tony Delk	6 ft 1 in (1.85 m)	189 lb (86 kg)	1974–01–28	Kentucky
F	33	Duane Ferrell	6 ft 7 in (2.01 m)	209 lb (95 kg)	1965–02–28	Georgia Tech
F	31	Adonal Foyle	6 ft 10 in (2.08 m)	270 lb (122 kg)	1975–03–09	Colgate
C	52	Todd Fuller	6 ft 11 in (2.11 m)	255 lb (116 kg)	1974–07–25	NC State
G	20	Jeff Grayer	6 ft 5 in (1.96 m)	200 lb (91 kg)	1965–12–17	Iowa State
G	22	Jim Jackson	6 ft 6 in (1.98 m)	220 lb (100 kg)	1970–10–14	Ohio State
G	2	Gerald Madkins	6 ft 4 in (1.93 m)	200 lb (91 kg)	1969–04–18	UCLA
F	3	Donyell Marshall (injured)	6 ft 9 in (2.06 m)	218 lb (99 kg)	1973–05–18	Connecticut
C	50	Felton Spencer	7 ft 0 in (2.13 m)	265 lb (120 kg)	1968–01–15	Louisville
G	15	Latrell Sprewell (S & C)	6 ft 5 in (1.96 m)	190 lb (86 kg)	1970–09–08	Alabama
F	30	Clarence Weatherspoon	6 ft 6 in (1.98 m)	240 lb (109 kg)	1970–09–08	Southern Miss

Coaches
Head coach
- P. J. Carlesimo
Assistant(s)
- Rod Higgins
- Bob Staak
- Paul Westhead

Legend
- (DP) Unsigned draft pick
- (FA) Free agent
- (S) Suspended
- Injured

Roster
Updated: April 9, 1998

=== Roster Notes ===
- Shooting guard Latrell Sprewell was suspended for 68 games for choking, and assaulting head coach P.J. Carlesimo during practice on December 1, 1997.

== Regular season ==
=== Season standings ===
Pacific Division	W	L	PCT	GB	Home	Road	Div
y-Seattle SuperSonics	61	21	.744	–	35–6	26–15	19–5
x-Los Angeles Lakers	61	21	.744	–	33–8	28–13	16–8
x-Phoenix Suns	56	26	.683	5	30–11	26–15	17–7
x-Portland Trail Blazers	46	36	.561	15	26–15	20–21	14–10
Sacramento Kings	27	55	.329	34	21–20	6–35	6–18
Golden State Warriors	19	63	.232	42	12–29	7–34	6–18
Los Angeles Clippers	17	65	.207	44	11–30	6–35	6–18

#	Western Conference				
#	Team	W	L	PCT	GB
1	z-Utah Jazz	62	20	.756	–
2	y-Seattle SuperSonics	61	21	.744	1
3	x-Los Angeles Lakers	61	21	.744	1
4	x-Phoenix Suns	56	26	.683	6
5	x-San Antonio Spurs	56	26	.683	6
6	x-Portland Trail Blazers	46	36	.561	16
7	x-Minnesota Timberwolves	45	37	.549	17
8	x-Houston Rockets	41	41	.500	21
9	Sacramento Kings	27	55	.329	35
10	Dallas Mavericks	20	62	.244	42
11	Vancouver Grizzlies	19	63	.232	43
12	Golden State Warriors	19	63	.232	43
13	Los Angeles Clippers	17	65	.207	45
14	Denver Nuggets	11	71	.134	51

z - clinched division title
y - clinched division title
x - clinched playoff spot

== Player statistics ==
Legend
GP	Games played	GS	Games started	MPG	Minutes per game
FG%	Field-goal percentage	3P%	3-point field-goal percentage	FT%	Free-throw percentage
RPG	Rebounds per game	APG	Assists per game	SPG	Steals per game
BPG	Blocks per game	PPG	Points per game

=== Regular season ===
Player	GP	GS	MPG	FG%	3P%	FT%	RPG	APG	SPG	BPG	PPG
Erick Dampier	82	82	32.4	.445	.000	.669	8.7	1.1	.5	1.7	11.8
Tony Delk^{†}	74	9	22.3	.392	.263	.738	2.3	2.3	1.0	.2	10.4
Donyell Marshall	73	73	35.8	.414	.313	.731	8.6	2.2	1.3	1.0	15.4
Felton Spencer	68	0	12.0	.457		.557	3.3	.3	.3	.5	2.4
Muggsy Bogues^{†}	59	31	26.3	.437	.250	.894	2.2	5.5	1.1	.1	5.8
Todd Fuller	57	1	10.8	.420	.000	.688	3.4	.2	.1	.3	4.0
Adonal Foyle	55	1	11.9	.406	.000	.435	3.3	.3	.2	.9	3.0
Bimbo Coles	53	44	27.8	.379	.228	.886	2.3	4.7	1.0	.2	8.0
Duane Ferrell	50	5	9.2	.369	.000	.545	.9	.5	.4	.1	1.9
Joe Smith^{†}	49	49	33.6	.429	.000	.769	6.9	1.4	.9	.8	17.3
Brian Shaw^{†}	39	32	26.4	.336	.313	.727	3.9	4.4	.9	.4	6.4
Jim Jackson^{†}	31	31	40.6	.402	.278	.805	5.6	5.1	1.2	.1	18.9
Clarence Weatherspoon^{†}	31	31	33.4	.458		.748	8.3	1.6	1.4	.7	10.7
Jason Caffey^{†}	29	6	24.6	.472	.000	.649	5.9	1.1	.4	.1	10.9
David Vaughn III^{†}	22	0	14.6	.404	.000	.647	4.6	.8	.5	.3	5.2
Gerald Madkins	19	0	12.8	.382	.400	.714	.8	2.4	.7	.1	1.9
Dickey Simpkins^{†}	19	0	10.3	.458	.000	.385	2.4	.8	.3	.1	2.8
Latrell Sprewell	14	13	39.1	.397	.188	.745	3.6	4.9	1.4	.4	21.4
Carl Thomas^{†}	10	0	13.9	.385	.238	.700	1.0	.9	.5	.1	6.2
Brandon Williams	9	2	15.6	.320	.333	.500	1.7	.3	.7	.3	4.1
B. J. Armstrong^{†}	4	0	14.8	.316	.000	.714	1.8	1.5	1.0	.0	4.3
Jeff Grayer^{†}	4	0	5.8	.571	.667		1.0	.3	.5	.0	2.5

- ^{†} Denotes player spent time with another team in the season. Stats reflect time with the Warriors only.

Player statistics citation:

== Transactions ==
=== Trades ===
August 12, 1997	To Golden State Warriors Erick Dampier; Duane Ferrell	To Indiana Pacers Chris Mullin

September 22, 1997	To Golden State Warriors Dickey Simpkins	To Chicago Bulls Scott Burrell

October 28, 1997	To Golden State Warriors Brian Shaw; David Vaughn	To Orlando Magic Mark Price

November 7, 1997	To Golden State Warriors Muggsy Bogues; Tony Delk	To Charlotte Hornets B. J. Armstrong

February 17, 1998	To Golden State Warriors Jim Jackson; Clarence Weatherspoon	To Philadelphia 76ers Brian Shaw; Joe Smith

February 19, 1998	To Golden State Warriors Jason Caffey	To Chicago Bulls David Vaughn; 1998 second-round pick 2000 second-round pick

June 24, 1998	To Golden State Warriors Antawn Jamison	To Toronto Raptors Vince Carter; Cash considerations

=== Free agents ===
Additions
Player	Date signed	Former team
Carl Thomas	September 26	Cleveland Cavaliers
Antonio Lang	October 7	Cleveland Cavaliers
Carl Thomas (10-day)	January 9	Orlando Magic
Brandon Williams (10-day)	February 10	none
Gerald Madkins (10-day)	March 5	Rockford Lightning (CBA)
Gerald Madkins (rest of season)	March 25	Golden State Warriors
Jeff Grayer (10-day)	April 9	Charlotte Hornets

Subtractions
Player	Date signed	New Team
Antonio Lang	October 27	Grand Rapids Hoops (CBA)
Carl Thomas	November 7	Golden State Warriors
Dickey Simpkins	February 17	Chicago Bulls

Player transactions citation:

== See also ==
- 1997-98 NBA season
