= Metro Conference (1975–1995) Men's Basketball Player of the Year =

College basketball award

Metro Conference Men's Basketball Player of the Year
- Awarded for: the most outstanding basketball player in the Metropolitan Intercollegiate Athletic (Metro) Conference
- Country: United States

History
- First award: 1977
- Final award: 1995

The Metro Conference Men's Basketball Player of the Year was an award given to the Metropolitan Intercollegiate Athletic (Metro) Conference's most outstanding player. The award was first given following the 1976–77 season and was discontinued after the 1994–95 season. In 1995 the Metro Conference merged with the Great Midwest Conference to form Conference USA. This Metro Conference is not to be confused with the conference that will operate as the Metro Conference starting July 1, 2026, previously known as the Metro Atlantic Athletic Conference.

There were three ties in the award's history, in 1978, 1981 and 1988. One player, Darrell Griffith of Louisville, was also named the national player of the year (1980) by being presented the John R. Wooden Award.

Louisville represents the most all-time winners with eight. The second most belong to Southern Miss with three, all of which belong to Clarence Weatherspoon. Weatherspoon was the only three-time winner of the award, while two others earned it twice (Keith Lee and Clifford Rozier).

== Key ==
†	Co-Players of the Year
*	Awarded a national player of the year award that same season: Helms Foundation College Basketball Player of the Year (1904–05 to 1978–79); UPI College Basketball Player of the Year (1954–55 to 1995–96); Oscar Robertson Trophy (1958–59 to present); Naismith College Player of the Year (1968–69 to present); John R. Wooden Award (1976–77 to present)
Player (X)	Denotes the number of times the player has been awarded the Metro Player of the Year award at that point

== Winners ==
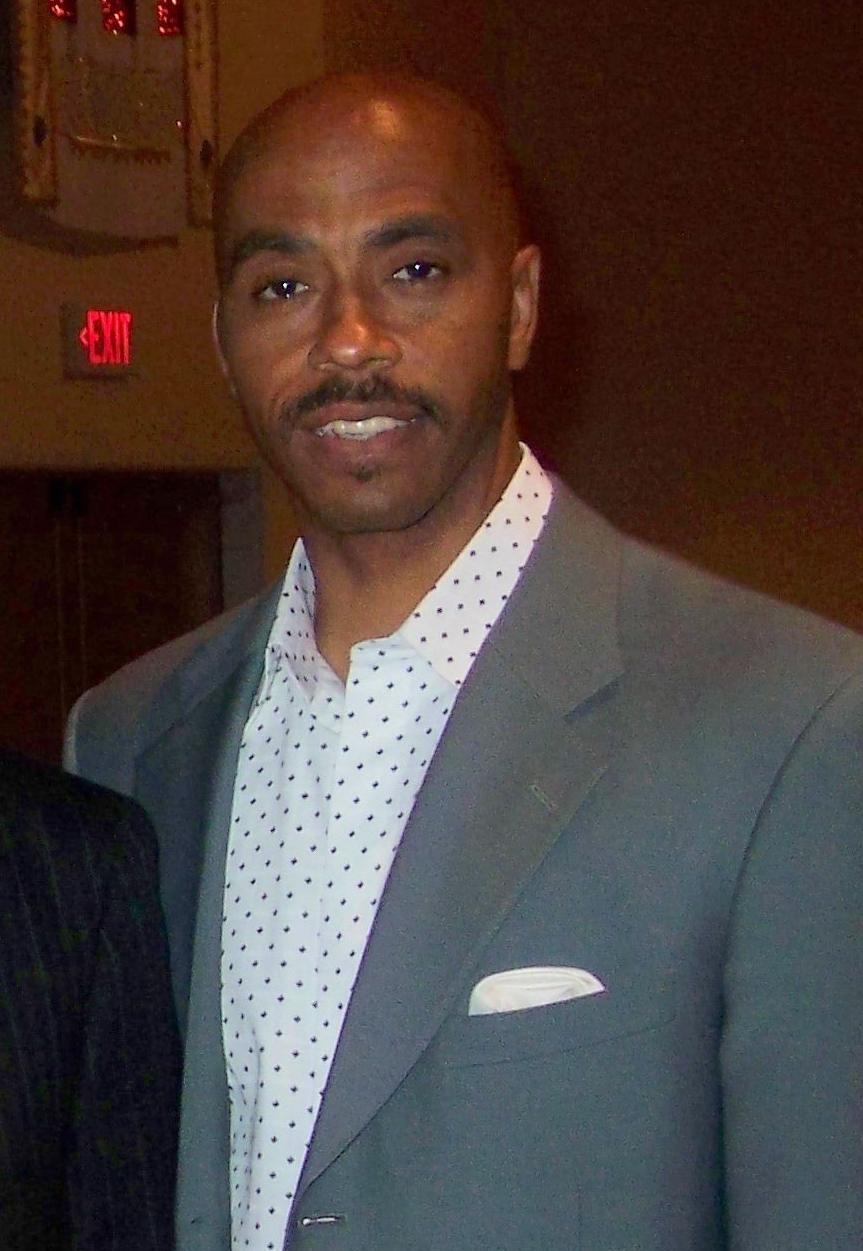
Darrell Griffith was the only Metro Conference Player of the Year (POY) to also win a National POY award—the Wooden Award in 1979–80.

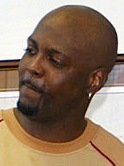
George McCloud won the award in 1989 as a player for Florida State University.

Season	Player	School	Position	Class	Reference
1976–77	Gary Yoder	Cincinnati	SG	Senior	
1977–78^{†}	Harry Davis	Florida State	SF	Senior	
1977–78^{†}	Rick Wilson	Louisville	SG/PG	Senior	
1978–79	Pat Cummings	Cincinnati	C	Senior	
1979–80	Darrell Griffith*	Louisville	SG	Senior	
1980–81^{†}	David Burns	Saint Louis	PG	Senior	
1980–81^{†}	Derek Smith	Louisville	SG	Junior	
1981–82	Keith Lee	Memphis	PF/C	Freshman	
1982–83	Rodney McCray	Louisville	SF	Senior	
1983–84	John "Hot Rod" Williams	Tulane	PF/C	Junior	
1984–85	Keith Lee (2)	Memphis	PF/C	Senior	
1985–86	Dell Curry	Virginia Tech	SF	Senior	
1986–87	Herbert Crook	Louisville	SF/SG	Junior	
1987–88^{†}	Bimbo Coles	Virginia Tech	PG	Sophomore	
1987–88^{†}	Pervis Ellison	Louisville	C	Junior	
1988–89	George McCloud	Florida State	SG/SF	Senior	
1989–90	Clarence Weatherspoon	Southern Miss	PF	Sophomore	
1990–91	Clarence Weatherspoon (2)	Southern Miss	PF	Junior	
1991–92	Clarence Weatherspoon (3)	Southern Miss	PF	Senior	
1992–93	Clifford Rozier	Louisville	C	Junior	
1993–94	Clifford Rozier (2)	Louisville	C	Senior	
1994–95	Jarvis Lang	Charlotte	PF	Senior	

== Winners by school ==
School (year joined)	Winners	Years
Louisville (1975)	8	1978^{†}, 1980, 1981^{†}, 1983, 1987, 1988^{†}, 1993, 1994
Southern Miss (1982)	3	1990, 1991, 1992
Cincinnati (1975)	2	1977, 1979
Florida State (1976)	2	1978^{†}, 1989
Memphis (1975)	2	1982, 1985
Virginia Tech (1979)	2	1986, 1988^{†}
Charlotte (1991)	1	1995
Saint Louis (1975)	1	1981^{†}
Tulane (1975)	1	1984
