= Keith Lee (basketball) =

American basketball player (born 1962)

Personal information
- Born: December 28, 1962 (age 63) West Memphis, Arkansas, U.S.
- Listed height: 6 ft 10 in (2.08 m)
- Listed weight: 215 lb (98 kg)

Career information
- High school: West Memphis (West Memphis, Arkansas)
- College: Memphis (1981–1985)
- NBA draft: 1985: 1st round, 11th overall pick
- Drafted by: Chicago Bulls
- Playing career: 1985–1995
- Position: Power forward / center
- Number: 24

Career history
- 1985–1987: Cleveland Cavaliers
- 1988–1989: New Jersey Nets
- 1991: Suncoast Sunblasters
- 1991–1992: Rapid City Thrillers
- 1992–1993: Independiente de Neuquén
- 1994: Memphis Fire
- 1995: Jackson Jackals

Career highlights
- 2× Consensus first-team All-American (1983, 1985); Consensus second-team All-American (1984); 2× Metro Conference Player of the Year (1982, 1985); 4× First-team All-Metro Conference (1982–1985); No. 24 retired by Memphis Tigers

Career statistics
- Points: 1,114 (6.1 ppg)
- Rebounds: 861 (4.7 rpg)
- Blocks: 110 (0.6 bpg)
- Stats at NBA.com
- Stats at Basketball Reference

Keith DeWayne Lee (born December 28, 1962) is an American former professional basketball player who was selected by the Chicago Bulls in the first round (11th pick overall) of the 1985 NBA draft later to be traded to the Cleveland Cavaliers. A 6 ft 10 in (2.08 m) forward–center from Memphis State University, Lee played in three NBA seasons for the Cleveland Cavaliers and New Jersey Nets.

== High school and college ==
Lee played high school basketball at West Memphis High School in West Memphis, Arkansas. The 1979–80 team is considered by many to be the top high school basketball team in Arkansas history, going undefeated for a 30–0 record. After losing future NBA player Michael Cage to graduation, the 1980–81 team went undefeated as well and set the longest winning streak for high school basketball in the state at 60 consecutive wins.

One of the most renowned players in Tiger basketball history, Keith Lee came to the University of Memphis in 1981–82 and made an immediate impact on the program.

During his four-year career, Memphis State compiled a record of 104–24, and made three NCAA tournament appearances (including one trip to the Final Four). Lee also guided the team to three Metro Conference titles, a school record 31 wins in 1984–85 and helped land the Tigers in the final Associated Press Top 20 poll all four seasons.

The four-time Associated Press All-American was Metro Conference Player of the Year in 1982 and 1985 and was named to 29 All-American teams. He is the Tigers all-time leading scorer with 2,408 points (18.8) and all-time leading rebounder with 1,336 (10.4). Lee has the high honor of being the first-ever four-time All American.

Lee was drafted by the Chicago Bulls in the 1985 NBA draft.

In 1985, Keith Lee helped lead the Memphis State Tigers to the 1985 Final Four and was also a first team All-American. He was the first Tiger to earn AP All-America honors four times (first team as a senior). Lee helped the Tigers compile a 104–24 record with four NCAA appearances from 1982 to 1985. His 2,408 career points are a Tiger record, and his number was retired in 1985.

== Professional ==
Lee's best year as a professional came during his rookie season for the Cleveland Cavaliers when he appeared in 58 games and averaged 7.4 point per game. In his NBA career, Lee played in 182 games and scored a total of 1,114 points.

Lee received a degree in interdisciplinary studies from the University of Memphis in December 2008, and is the head basketball coach at a Shelby County Schools high school.

== Career statistics ==
Legend
GP	Games played	GS	Games started	MPG	Minutes per game
FG%	Field goal percentage	3P%	3-point field goal percentage	FT%	Free throw percentage
RPG	Rebounds per game	APG	Assists per game	SPG	Steals per game
BPG	Blocks per game	PPG	Points per game	**Bold**	Career high

=== NBA ===
==== Regular season ====
Year	Team	GP	GS	MPG	FG%	3P%	FT%	RPG	APG	SPG	BPG	PPG
1985–86	Cleveland	58	**38**	**20.6**	**.466**	**.222**	**.781**	**6.1**	**1.2**	**.5**	**.6**	**7.4**
1986–87	Cleveland	**67**	1	13.0	.455	.000	.713	3.7	1.0	.4	**.6**	6.1
1988–89	New Jersey	57	4	14.7	.422	.000	.746	4.5	.7	.4	**.6**	4.8
Career		182	43	16.0	.451	.167	.746	4.7	1.0	.4	.6	6.1

== See also ==
- List of NCAA Division I men's basketball players with 2,000 points and 1,000 rebounds
