= Clarence Weatherspoon =

American basketball player (born 1970)

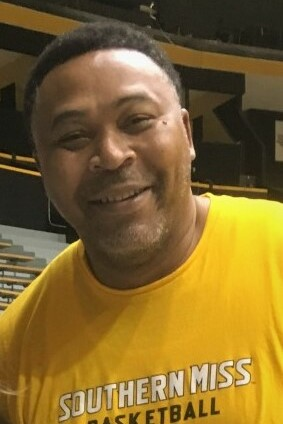
- Weatherspoon in 2019

Meridian Community College
- Title: Head coach
- League: Mississippi Association of Community & Junior Colleges

Personal information
- Born: September 8, 1970 (age 56) Crawford, Mississippi, U.S.
- Listed height: 6 ft 7 in (2.01 m)
- Listed weight: 270 lb (122 kg)

Career information
- High school: Motley (Columbus, Mississippi)
- College: Southern Miss (1988–1992)
- NBA draft: 1992: 1st round, 9th overall pick
- Drafted by: Philadelphia 76ers
- Playing career: 1992–2005
- Position: Power forward / small forward
- Number: 30, 35
- Coaching career: 2016–present

Career history

Playing
- 1992–1998: Philadelphia 76ers
- 1998: Golden State Warriors
- 1999–2000: Miami Heat
- 2000–2001: Cleveland Cavaliers
- 2001–2003: New York Knicks
- 2003–2005: Houston Rockets

Coaching
- 2016–2022: Southern Miss (assistant)
- 2022–2024: Jones County JC (assistant)
- 2024–present: Meridian CC

Career highlights
- NBA All-Rookie Second Team (1993); Third-team All-American – UPI (1991); 3× Metro Conference Player of the Year (1990–1992); 3× First-team All-Metro Conference (1990–1992)

Career NBA statistics
- Points: 10,483 (11.5 ppg)
- Rebounds: 6,846 (7.5 rpg)
- Assists: 1,346 (1.5 apg)
- Stats at NBA.com
- Stats at Basketball Reference
Medals
Men's Basketball
Representing United States
Pan American Games
Bronze medal – third place	1991 Havana	Team Competition
Goodwill Games
Silver medal – second place	1990 Seattle	Team Competition

Clarence Weatherspoon Sr. (born September 8, 1970) is an American former professional basketball player in the National Basketball Association (NBA). He is currently the head coach for Meridian Community College. Previously, he was an assistant coach for Jones County JC and the Southern Miss Golden Eagles.

Born in Crawford, Mississippi, at the University of Southern Mississippi, Weatherspoon was a three-time Metro Conference Men's Basketball Player of the Year, the only player in conference history to achieve the feat three times. He was selected by the Philadelphia 76ers as the ninth pick in the 1992 NBA draft. He played for the 76ers, the Golden State Warriors, the Miami Heat, the Cleveland Cavaliers, the New York Knicks and the Houston Rockets, averaging 11.5 points per game throughout his career.

At six-foot-seven-inches and 250 pounds (201 cm, 113 kg), he was nicknamed "Baby Barkley" early during his career due to a similar aggressive playing style attributed to fellow short-statured NBA power forward and former 76er, Charles Barkley.

He participated in the 1993 Slam Dunk contest, finishing second to Harold Miner with an overall score of 92.

== College career ==
After playing his high school basketball at Motley High School, in Columbus, Mississippi, Weatherspoon decided to attend the University of Southern Mississippi, where he became the school's most decorated basketball player.

Weatherspoon finished his four-year career at Southern Mississippi with averages of 18.5 points and 11.3 rebounds per game. He is first on the school's all-time list in rebounding, blocked shots, and minutes; is second in scoring (just six points behind all-time leader Nick Revon); and third in points per game, field goals made, field goal percentage, free throws made and attempted, and steals.

The Golden Eagles were 64–53 during Weatherspoon's four seasons, including a 21–8 record in 1991 when USM were nationally ranked (at one point reaching no. 9) and advanced to the NCAA tournament. The Golden Eagles fell to NC State on March 14, 1991, in the opening round of the East Regional, 114–85, and Weatherspoon scored 21 points. It was the second straight season USM had made the NCAA tournament; in 1990 they had lost 79–63 in the opening round to La Salle. Weatherspoon led the Golden Eagles with 16 points.

Weatherspoon was named Metro Conference Player of the Year for three straight years, from 1990 to 1992. He is the only three-time recipient of the award, and remains the all-time leading rebounder in the conference's history.

Weatherspoon became the first Golden Eagle to have his jersey retired when his #35 was raised to the rafters on March 7, 1992, on the night of his final home game.

As a collegian, Weatherspoon twice represented the US in international competition. In 1990, Weatherspoon was on the silver medal-winning USA team that participated in the Goodwill Games. In 1991, Weatherspoon was on the USA's team for the Pan-American games played in Cuba; the USA won the bronze medal, and in the tournament's seven games Weatherspoon averaged 9.6 points and 6.3 rebounds.

In February 1991, Weatherspoon was the focus of a five-page feature in Sports Illustrated.

While at Southern Mississippi, Weatherspoon had a trademark dunk called the "Spoon Feed."

Weatherspoon was inducted into the Southern Mississippi Alumni Association Hall of Fame in 2007.

== NBA career ==
Weatherspoon was drafted by the Philadelphia 76ers (Round 1, Pick 9) in the 1992 NBA draft. He was drafted just three days after the Sixers had traded away Charles Barkley to Phoenix.

The Philadelphia media, who had once called Weatherspoon the "Metro's Barkley" during one of USM's NCAA tournament appearances, instantly drew comparisons between the departed Barkley and the recently drafted Weatherspoon. Spoon, listed at 6'7" but appearing closer to 6'5", was, like Barkley, an undersized power forward with a strong desire for rebounding and operating underneath the basket. Weatherspoon was referred to as "Baby Barkley" at times during his early career. He is often remembered for multiple pump fakes under the basket when scoring down low.

Weatherspoon quietly had an excellent rookie campaign for the struggling 76ers. He averaged 15.6 points per game, which placed him third on the team, and he broke Lee Shaffer's thirty-one-year-old record for most points in a season by a Sixers rookie (the record has since been broken by both Jerry Stackhouse and Allen Iverson). Spoon led the 76ers in rebounding, was fourth among rookies in scoring (trailing Shaquille O'Neal, Alonzo Mourning and Christian Laettner), and scored a season-high 30 points in a nationally televised game at Denver. He was named to the all-rookie second team.

Weatherspoon's second season was his finest as a professional. He led the 76ers in scoring at 18.4 points per game and averaged what turned out to be a career-high 10.1 rebounds per game. He was extremely consistent, scoring in double-figures in 80 of 82 games, and recording 46 double-doubles. He registered his only career triple-double in a February 1994 home win over Charlotte (15 points, 15 rebounds, and 13 assists), and scored a then career-high 31 points against Cleveland. He was one of only five players to have over 100 in the five major statistical categories (points, rebounds, assists, blocks, and steals), joining Hakeem Olajuwon, David Robinson, Shawn Kemp, and Clifford Robinson. Spoon was the only player of the group to not play in that season's All-Star Game in Minneapolis. He narrowly missed selection, receiving 13 of 15 votes from the East coaches.

Philadelphia hired John Lucas as its coach and general manager in 1994, and Lucas moved Weatherspoon to the small forward position for the 1994–95 campaign. The Sixers included many lottery picks on the team: Weatherspoon, Shawn Bradley, taken second in 1993, and Sharone Wright, taken sixth in 1994. Weatherspoon averaged 18.1 points per game, but saw his rebounding numbers dip from his new position, down to 6.9 per game. He matched his career-high with 31 points in a January game at Phoenix against Charles Barkley. The Sixers won 24 games.

Lucas drafted Jerry Stackhouse third overall in 1995, and in retained several unpredictable players, including Vernon Maxwell and Richard Dumas. Within the season's opening month they had traded Bradley to New Jersey for Derrick Coleman, and the Sixers, while talented, were never able to develop consistency, save for Weatherspoon. He averaged 16.7 points per game, second behind Stackhouse's 19.2, and 9.7 rebounds per game. Spoon recorded 30 double-doubles, scored 20 or more 30 times, and was one of six players to record 100 in five of the major statistical categories. On the final day of the regular season, in a game at Toronto, Weatherspoon scored a career-high 35 points to go with 14 rebounds and 7 blocks. The season was not a success one, with Philadelphia winning 18 games—their win total decreasing every year of Weatherspoon's career as several coaches and players transferred.

The 1996–97 season brought with it promise, as the 76ers drafted Allen Iverson with the first overall selection. He joined Stackhouse, Coleman, and Weatherspoon on a talented Sixers squad whose pre-season mantra was "New Spirit, New Attitude." Philadelphia had fired Lucas and hired Johnny Davis to coach, and the team continued losing. Weatherspoon saw his role reduced, averaging 12.2 points and 8.3 rebounds for a Sixers team that battled injuries, consistency, and maturity. Weatherspoon's season-high of 34 points came against Golden State in January.

Davis was fired the day after the season ended and shortly after, Larry Brown was hired. Brown's first move was to trade Weatherspoon to Boston along with Michael Cage for Dino Radja. The trade fell through after Radja failed his physical, and the Sixers' lack of communication with Weatherspoon, after five years of service, during this time angered him. He reported to camp unhappy though played dutifully as both a starter and, for the first time in his career, as a reserve. Weatherspoon's name was constantly in trade rumors, with the low point occurring during a December 1997 game with Miami, when Brown did not insert Weatherspoon into the first half because he thought he had already been traded. That trade did not occur until February when Philadelphia sent Weatherspoon and Jim Jackson to Golden State for Joe Smith and Brian Shaw.

On January 24, 1999, Weatherspoon signed as a free agent with the Miami Heat. After one season with the team, he was traded to the Cleveland Cavaliers in a three-team trade that sent Portland Trail Blazers forward Brian Grant to the Heat.

On July 21, 2001, Weatherspoon signed as a free agent with the New York Knicks.

On December 30, 2003, Weatherspoon was traded to the Houston Rockets for Moochie Norris and John Amaechi. The Rockets waived him on August 15, 2005.

== NBA career statistics ==
Legend
GP	Games played	GS	Games started	MPG	Minutes per game
FG%	Field goal percentage	3P%	3-point field goal percentage	FT%	Free throw percentage
RPG	Rebounds per game	APG	Assists per game	SPG	Steals per game
BPG	Blocks per game	PPG	Points per game	**Bold**	Career high
*	Led the league

=== Regular season ===
Year	Team	GP	GS	MPG	FG%	3P%	FT%	RPG	APG	SPG	BPG	PPG
1992–93	Philadelphia	**82**	**82**	32.4	.469	**.250**	.713	7.2	1.8	1.0	.8	15.6
1993–94	Philadelphia	**82**	**82**	38.4	.483	.235	.693	**10.1**	2.3	1.2	**1.4**	**18.4**
1994–95	Philadelphia	76	76	39.4	.439	.190	.751	6.9	**2.8**	**1.5**	.9	18.1
1995–96	Philadelphia	78	75	**39.7**	.484	.000	.746	9.7	2.0	1.4	**1.4**	16.7
1996–97	Philadelphia	**82**	**82***	36.0	.491	.167	.738	8.3	1.7	.9	1.0	12.2
1997–98	Philadelphia	48	18	26.9	.426	–	.707	7.0	.8	.9	1.1	8.4
1997–98	Golden State	31	31	33.4	.458	–	.748	8.3	1.6	1.4	.7	10.7
1998–99	Miami	49	3	21.2	**.534**	–	.804	5.0	.7	.6	.3	8.1
1999–00	Miami	78	2	20.7	.513	–	.738	5.8	1.2	.7	.6	7.2
2000–01	Cleveland	**82**	**82***	33.9	.501	–	.790	9.7	1.3	1.0	1.3	11.3
2001–02	New York	56	41	30.8	.418	–	.795	8.2	1.1	.7	.9	8.8
2002–03	New York	79	19	25.6	.449	–	.768	7.6	.9	.9	.5	6.6
2003–04	New York	15	1	14.5	.450	–	**.947**	3.3	.9	.5	.1	3.6
2003–04	Houston	37	0	17.6	.503	.000	.660	4.2	.5	.6	.4	5.6
2004–05	Houston	40	18	13.1	.412	–	.829	3.1	.4	.2	.2	3.1
Career		915	612	30.3	.471	.196	.743	7.5	1.5	1.0	.9	11.5

=== Playoffs ===
Year	Team	GP	GS	MPG	FG%	3P%	FT%	RPG	APG	SPG	BPG	PPG
1999	Miami	5	0	**22.4**	.346	–	**.647**	**4.2**	**.4**	**1.4**	.2	5.8
2000	Miami	**10**	0	17.0	**.417**	–	.583	4.1	.1	.4	**.3**	**6.4**
2004	Houston	2	0	11.0	.400	–	.500	2.0	.0	.0	.0	3.5
2005	Houston	1	0	.2	–	–	–	.0	.0	.0	.0	.0
Career		18	0	17.9	.396	–	.596	3.7	.2	.6	.2	5.6

== Post-NBA career ==
In 2016, Weatherspoon was named an assistant coach of the men's basketball team for his alma mater, Southern Miss. In 2022, Weatherspoon was named an assistant coach for the men's basketball team at Jones County JC in Ellisville, Mississippi.

As of June 5, 2024, Weatherspoon was named Head Coach for the men's basketball team at Meridian Community College in Meridian, Mississippi.

== See also ==
- List of NCAA Division I men's basketball players with 2,000 points and 1,000 rebounds
