= Harry Davis (basketball) =

American basketball player

Personal information
- Born: January 27, 1956 (age 70) Cleveland, Ohio, U.S.
- Listed height: 6 ft 7 in (2.01 m)
- Listed weight: 220 lb (100 kg)

Career information
- High school: Cathedral Latin (Cleveland, Ohio)
- College: Florida State (1974–1978)
- NBA draft: 1978: 2nd round, 33rd overall pick
- Drafted by: Cleveland Cavaliers
- Playing career: 1978–1985
- Position: Power forward
- Number: 40, 23

Career history

Playing
- 1978–1979: Cleveland Cavaliers
- 1979–1980: Maine Lumberjacks
- 1980: San Antonio Spurs
- 1980–1982: Atlantic City Hi-Rollers
- 1983–1984: Zaragoza
- 1984–1985: Lancaster Lightning
- 1985: Detroit Spirits

Coaching
- 1981–1982: Atlantic City Hi-Rollers

Career highlights
- Metro Conference co-Player of the Year (1978); First-team All-Metro Conference (1978)
- Stats at NBA.com
- Stats at Basketball Reference

Harry A. Davis (born January 27, 1957) is an American former basketball player who played for two seasons in the National Basketball Association (NBA) for the Cleveland Cavaliers and San Antonio Spurs.

Davis, a 6'7 forward from Cathedral Latin High School in Cleveland, Davis played for coach Hugh Durham at Florida State University from 1974 to 1978. Davis scored 1,514 points in his career, averaging 14.0 points and 6.8 rebounds per game. His best year was 1977–78, where he averaged 19.5 points and 7.4 rebounds per game and was named Metro Conference co-player of the year with Louisville's Rick Wilson. He led the Seminoles to the 1978 NCAA tournament.

Following his collegiate career, Davis was drafted by his hometown Cleveland Cavaliers in the 1978 NBA draft (second round, pick #33). He played one season with the Cavaliers, averaging 4.1 points and 1.7 rebounds per game in 40 games. He was waived the following season, but signed a 10-day contract with the San Antonio Spurs. He averaged 3.3 points and 1.4 rebounds per game in his last 4 games in the NBA.

Davis played in the Continental Basketball Association until 1985, most notably for the Atlantic City Hi-Rollers, where he finished among the league's top scorers in 1981 and 1982. Davis also played in Europe. He also served as the team's head coach during the 1981–82 season.

Davis was inducted into the Florida State University athletic Hall of Fame in 1998.

== Career statistics ==
Legend
| GP | Games played | GS | Games started | MPG | Minutes per game |
| FG% | Field goal percentage | 3P% | 3-point field goal percentage | FT% | Free throw percentage |
| RPG | Rebounds per game | APG | Assists per game | SPG | Steals per game |
| BPG | Blocks per game | PPG | Points per game | **Bold** | Career high |

=== NBA ===
==== Regular season ====
| Year | Team | GP | MPG | FG% | 3P% | FT% | RPG | APG | SPG | BPG | PPG |
|---|---|---|---|---|---|---|---|---|---|---|---|
| 1978–79 | Cleveland | **40** | **9.9** | .431 | | **.698** | **1.7** | **.4** | **.3** | **.2** | **4.1** |
| 1979–80 | San Antonio | 4 | 7.5 | **.500** | – | .500 | 1.5 | .0 | **.3** | .0 | 3.3 |
| Career | | 44 | 9.6 | .436 | – | .689 | 1.6 | .4 | .3 | .2 | 4.0 |
