= Atlantic City Hi-Rollers =

Atlantic City/Wildwood Hi-Rollers
- Conference: Eastern
- Leagues: CBA
- Founded: 1980
- Folded: 1982
- Location: Atlantic City, New Jersey (1980–81); Wildwood, New Jersey (1981–82)
- Team colors: red, black, white

The Atlantic City Hi-Rollers, also known as the Wildwood Hi-Rollers, were an American basketball team based in Atlantic City, New Jersey and later Wildwood, New Jersey. The team were members of the Continental Basketball Association (CBA) from 1980 to 1982. The team was previously known as the Utica Olympics.

After playing their first season in Atlantic City, team president Bill Waldman announced the Hi-Rollers would play part of their 1981–82 season at the Wildwoods Convention Center in Wildwood, New Jersey. The team's first game in Wildwood was so well attended compared to the games in Atlantic City that the team announced they would relocate to Wildwood permanently for the remainder of the season. Harry Davis was selected to the 1982 CBA All-Star Game as a member of the Hi-Rollers. Davis scored 12 points in the game. The Hi-Rollers received a "statistical probation" by the CBA after an investigation uncovered discrepancies made by the team's statistician including attributing assists to Andre McCarter that never occurred. During a CBA board of directors meeting in May 1982 it was announced that the Hi-Rollers were folding due to poor ticket sales.

== Year-by-year ==
| Year | League | GP | W | L | Pct. | GB | Reg. season | Playoffs |
|---|---|---|---|---|---|---|---|---|
| 1980/81 | CBA | 40 | 22 | 18 | .550 | 12 | 2nd, Eastern | Lost Eastern Semi Finals 2–1 Vs Philadelphia Kings |
| 1981/82 | CBA | 46 | 15 | 31 | .326 | – | 4th, Eastern | Did not qualify |
| Total | CBA | 86 | 37 | 49 | .430 | – | – | Playoff Record 1–2 |
