= Gerald Madkins =

American basketball player-coach

New York Knicks
- Title: Former Assistant general manager
- League: NBA

Personal information
- Born: April 18, 1969 (age 57) Merced, California
- Listed height: 6 ft 4 in (1.93 m)
- Listed weight: 200 lb (91 kg)

Career information
- High school: Merced (Merced, California)
- College: UCLA (1987–1992)
- NBA draft: 1992: undrafted
- Playing career: 1993–1998
- Position: Shooting guard
- Number: 12, 2

Career history
- 1992–1993: Grand Rapids Hoops
- 1993–1994: Cleveland Cavaliers
- 1994–1995: Grand Rapids Mackers / Hoops
- 1996: Joventut Badalona
- 1996: Cholet Basket
- 1997: Rockford Lightning
- 1998: Golden State Warriors
- 1998–1999: Joventut Badalona
- 1999: Grand Rapids Hoops

Career highlights
- All-CBA First Team (1998); CBA Rookie of the Year (1993); CBA All-Rookie First Team (1993); CBA assists leader (1998)
- Stats at NBA.com
- Stats at Basketball Reference

Gerald Madkins Jr. (born April 18, 1969) is an American professional basketball executive who is a former assistant general manager for the New York Knicks of the National Basketball Association (NBA). He is a former professional basketball player.

Born in Merced, California, Madkins attended University of California, Los Angeles (UCLA). He signed with the Cleveland Cavaliers of the NBA and played with them from 1993 to 1994, and was signed by the Miami Heat on January 21, 1998. Madkins played briefly with the Golden State Warriors in 1998. He also played in the Continental Basketball Association (CBA) for the Grand Rapids Hoops and Rockford Lightning. He was named CBA Rookie of the Year with the Hoops in 1993 and selected to the All-CBA First Team with the Lightning in 1998. He also played overseas in Spain and France.

After his retirement from basketball, he acted as an assistant coach for California State University, Stanislaus, and for his alma mater, the UCLA Bruins, In 2003 was named a player scout for the New York Knicks. During the 2007–08 season he served as Director of West Coast College Scouting for the Seattle SuperSonics. On September 10, 2008, Madkins was named Director of Scouting by the Houston Rockets. In 2010, he joined the New Orleans Hornets as their Vice President of Player Personnel.

On September 24, 2012, Madkins was hired by the Los Angeles Clippers as their director of basketball operations, reporting to vice president of basketball operations Gary Sacks. In June 2014, Clippers coach Doc Rivers was promoted from senior vice president to president of basketball operations, and Madkins was named Director of Scouting as part of Rivers' restructuring. He was promoted to assistant general manager prior to the start of the 2015–16 season.
