= 1977–78 Cincinnati Bearcats men's basketball team =

American college basketball season

1977–78 Cincinnati Bearcats men's basketball
- Conference: Metro Conference (1975–1995)
- Record: 17–10 (6–6 Metro)
- Head coach: Gale Catlett
- Home arena: Riverfront Coliseum

The 1977–78 Cincinnati Bearcats men's basketball team represented the University of Cincinnati during the 1977–78 NCAA Division I men's basketball season. The Bearcats were led by head coach Gale Catlett, as members of the Metro Conference.

== Roster ==
1977–78 Cincinnati Bearcats men's basketball team
Players
Coaches

Pos.	#	Name	Height	Weight	Year	Hometown
G	43	Jeff Bentley	6 ft 4 in (1.93 m)	190 lb (86 kg)	Fr	Mason, Ohio
F	34	Curtis Cabbell	6 ft 4 in (1.93 m)	—		Charleston, West Virginia
G	31	Steve Collier	6 ft 4 in (1.93 m)	—	Sr	Queens, New York
F	42	Pat Cummings	6 ft 9 in (2.06 m)	230 lb (104 kg)	RS Jr	Johnstown, Pennsylvania
G/F	45	Lionel Harvey	6 ft 5 in (1.96 m)	—	Fr	West Hempstead, New York
G	22	Keith Hemans	6 ft 3 in (1.91 m)	—	So	Queens, New York
F	32	Greg Johnson	6 ft 6 in (1.98 m)	—	So	Cincinnati, Ohio
F	14	Mike Jones	6 ft 5 in (1.96 m)	—	Sr	Charleston, West Virginia
G	10	David Kennedy	6 ft 2 in (1.88 m)	170 lb (77 kg)	Fr	Pittsburgh, PA
G	20	Eddie Lee	6 ft 4 in (1.93 m)	185 lb (84 kg)	So	Queens, New York
F	41	Bob Miller	6 ft 10 in (2.08 m)	230 lb (104 kg)	Sr	Louisville, Kentucky
C	33	Marcus Penny	6 ft 9 in (2.06 m)	—	Jr	Tulsa, Oklahoma
G	25	Bobby Sherlock	5 ft 11 in (1.8 m)	—	Jr	Watervliet, New York
G	23	Mick Shoemaker	6 ft 0 in (1.83 m)	—	Jr	Bourneville, Ohio

Head coach

- Gale Catlett

Assistant coach(es)

Legend

- (C) Team captain
- (S) Suspended
- (I) Ineligible
- (W) Walk-on
- Injured
- Current redshirt

== Schedule ==
Date time, TV	Rank^{#}	Opponent^{#}	Result	Record	Site city, state
November 26*		Akron	W 91–81	1–0	Riverfront Coliseum; Cincinnati, Ohio
December 1*		North Carolina A&T	W 58–57	2–0	Riverfront Coliseum; Cincinnati, Ohio
December 3*		Biscayne	W 77–62	3–0	Riverfront Coliseum; Cincinnati, Ohio
December 6*	No. 7	Miami (OH)	W 61–60	4–0	Riverfront Coliseum; Cincinnati, Ohio
December 12*		Eastern Kentucky	W 73–58	5–0	Riverfront Coliseum; Cincinnati, Ohio
December 17*		at North Carolina	L 59–67	5–1	Greensboro Coliseum
December 21*		Austin Peay	W 81–67	6–1	Riverfront Coliseum; Cincinnati, Ohio
December 27		Florida State	W 77–75	7–1 (1–0)	Riverfront Coliseum; Cincinnati, Ohio
January 2		Georgia Tech	L 56–59	7–2 (1–1)	Alexander Memorial Coliseum; Atlanta, Georgia
January 4		at Tulane	W 102–67	8–2 (2–1)	Avron B. Fogelman Arena; New Orleans, Louisiana
January 7		Louisville	L 75–78	8–3 (2–2)	Riverfront Coliseum; Cincinnati, Ohio
January 10		St. Louis	W 66–55	9–3 (3–2)	Riverfront Coliseum; Cincinnati, Ohio
January 14		at Memphis State	L 63–67	9–4 (3–3)	Mid-South Coliseum; Memphis, Tennessee
January 17		at Florida State	L 66–76	9–5 (3–4)	Tully Gymnasium; Tallahassee, Florida
January 21		Memphis State	L 76–83	9–6 (3–5)	Riverfront Coliseum; Cincinnati, Ohio
January 23*		Pittsburgh	W 87–80	10–6 (3–5)	Riverfront Coliseum; Cincinnati, Ohio
January 30		Tulane	W 70–63	11–6 (4–5)	Riverfront Coliseum; Cincinnati, Ohio
February 2*		at St. John’s	L 66–75	11–7 (4–5)	Madison Square Garden; New York, NY
February 4		at Louisville	L 76–83	11–8 (4–6)	Freedom Hall; Louisville, Kentucky
February 9		Georgia Tech	W 75–67	12–8 (5–6)	Riverfront Coliseum; Cincinnati, Ohio
February 11*		at Dayton	W 42–40	13–8 (5–6)	University of Dayton Arena; Dayton, Ohio
February 13*		Xavier	W 59–54	14–8 (5–6)	Riverfront Coliseum; Cincinnati, Ohio
February 15		at St. Louis	W 80–62	15–8 (6–6)	Kiel Auditorium; St. Louis, Missouri
February 18*		at Marquette	L 45–57	15–9 (6–6)	MECCA Arena; Milwaukee, Wisconsin
February 24*		West Virginia	W 96–80	16–9 (6–6)	Cincinnati Gardens; Cincinnati, Ohio
February 26*		at Duquesne	W 72–64	17–9 (6–6)	Civic Arena; Pittsburgh, Pennsylvania
Metro Tournament
March 2		Georgia Tech	L 38–39	17–10 (6–6)	Riverfront Coliseum; Cincinnati, Ohio
*Non-conference game. ^{#}Rankings from AP Poll. (#) Tournament seedings in parentheses.

== Players selected in NBA drafts ==
Round	Pick	Player	NBA club
3	59	Pat Cummings	Milwaukee Bucks
4	85	Bob Miller	Phoenix Suns
