= Rick Wilson (basketball) =

American basketball player (born 1956)

Personal information
- Born: February 7, 1956 (age 70) Louisville, Kentucky, U.S.
- Listed height: 6 ft 5 in (1.96 m)
- Listed weight: 200 lb (91 kg)

Career information
- High school: Atherton (Louisville, Kentucky)
- College: Louisville (1974–1978)
- NBA draft: 1978: 2nd round, 25th overall pick
- Drafted by: Atlanta Hawks
- Position: Shooting guard
- Number: 42

Career history
- 1978–1980: Atlanta Hawks
- 1979–1980: Utica Olympics
- 1980–1981: Atlantic City Hi-Rollers

Career highlights
- Metro Conference co-Player of the Year (1978); First-team All-Metro Conference (1978)
- Stats at NBA.com
- Stats at Basketball Reference

Richard Wilson (born February 7, 1956) is an American former professional basketball player. He played for the Atlanta Hawks of the National Basketball Association (NBA) from 1978 to 1980.

== College career ==
Wilson graduated from Atherton High School in Louisville, Kentucky. He played collegiately for the University of Louisville from 1974 to 1978. As a freshman, Wilson was a reserve on the Cardinals' 1975 Final Four team. Wilson then entered the starting lineup for the rest of his Louisville career. As a sophomore, he averaged 14.8 points, 6.3 rebounds and 4.5 assists per game and led the Cardinals to the 1976 National Invitation Tournament. As a junior, Wilson teamed with senior backcourt mate Phil Bond and led the Cardinals back to the 1977 NCAA tournament, where they lost to UCLA.

In his senior year, the 1977–78 season, Wilson averaged 17.8 points, 5.2 rebounds and 4.5 assists as he led the Cardinals to a Metro Conference championship and was named MVP of the 1978 Metro Conference men's basketball tournament. Wilson was named Metro Conference player of the year that season.

== Professional career ==
Following his senior season, Wilson was drafted in the second round of the 1978 NBA draft by the Atlanta Hawks (25th pick overall). He played in 81 games as a rookie in 1978–79, averaging 3.0 points, 1.2 rebounds and 1.2 assists per game in a reserve role. The next season, Wilson played in 5 games before being released by the Hawks. He finished the season with the Utica Olympics of the Continental Basketball Association (CBA). The next season, Wilson played with the Atlantic City Hi-Rollers.

== Life after basketball ==
Wilson became a regular contributor in professional softball, playing the outfield for the Kentucky Bourbons of the United Professional Softball League from 1981 to 1982, helping Kentucky to a World Series title in 1981 in a 5–3 series victory over the New England Pilgrims. Wilson left the Bourbons early in the 1982 season.

Wilson went to work for the Jefferson County, Kentucky sheriff's department, but resigned in 1990 with a conviction for dealing cocaine. Battling an addiction, Wilson was later sentenced on a probation violation and ordered to a work-release program, but was sentenced to 10 years in prison after a shooting incident.

== Career statistics ==
Legend
GP	Games played	GS	Games started	MPG	Minutes per game
FG%	Field goal percentage	3P%	3-point field goal percentage	FT%	Free throw percentage
RPG	Rebounds per game	APG	Assists per game	SPG	Steals per game
BPG	Blocks per game	PPG	Points per game	**Bold**	Career high

=== NBA ===
==== Regular season ====
Year	Team	GP	GS	MPG	FG%	3P%	FT%	RPG	APG	SPG	BPG	PPG
1978–79	Atlanta	**61**	0	9.7	**.411**		.545	**1.2**	1.2	.5	.1	**3.0**
1979–80	Atlanta	5		**11.8**	.143	–	**.667**	.6	**2.2**	**.8**	**.2**	1.6
Career		66	0	9.8	.393	–	.560	1.2	1.3	.5	.1	2.9

==== Playoffs ====
Year	Team	GP	MPG	FG%	FT%	RPG	APG	SPG	BPG	PPG
1979	Atlanta	1	1.0	–	–	.0	.0	.0	.0	.0
