= Hola (VPN) =

Freemium VPN service

- Logo used since 2023
- Type: Private
- Industry: Internet
- Founded: 2007
- Founder: Ofer Vilenski; Derry Shribman
- Headquarters: Israel
- Number of locations: Worldwide
- Services: Virtual private networking
- Website: www.hola.org

Hola is a freemium web and mobile application which provides a form of VPN service to its users through a peer-to-peer network. It also uses peer-to-peer caching. When a user accesses certain domains that are known to use geo-blocking, the Hola application redirects the request to go through the computers and Internet connections of other users in non-blocked areas, thereby circumventing the blocking. Users of the free service agree to become peers in the Bright Data network, a residential proxy provider. Paying users do not become peers.

== History ==
In 1998, Ofer Vilenski and Derry Shribman founded KRFTech, a software development tools company. With the profits from the company, they started Jungo in 2000 to develop an operating system for home gateways. In 2006, NDS (Cisco) acquired Jungo for $107 million.

In 2008, Vilenski and Shribman started investigating the idea of re-inventing HTTP by building a peer-to-peer overlay network that would employ peer-to-peer caching to accelerate content distribution and peer-to-peer routing to make the effective bandwidth to target sites much faster. This would make the Internet faster for users and cheaper to operate for content distributors. They started up Hola with $18 million from investors such as DFJ (Skype, Hotmail), Horizons Ventures (Li Ka-shing's venture capital fund), Magma Venture Partners (Waze), Israel's Chief Scientist Fund, and others.

Hola Networks Limited launched its network in late 2012, and it became popular in January 2013 when consumers started using Hola for Internet privacy and anonymity by utilizing the P2P routing for IP masking. "After being around for two months with 80 downloads a day, on January 23, 2013, at 5 PM Israel time, the product was good enough. That was the second it took off and went up overnight to 40,000 downloads a day", Vilenski told Startup Camel.

In May 2015, Hola came under criticism from 8chan founder Fredrick Brennan after the site was reportedly attacked by exploiting the Hola network. In late 2014, Hola had begun selling access to its userbase as exit nodes, under the name Luminati, charging $20 per gigabyte for bandwidth that was actually coming from their free VPN users. This was confirmed by Hola founder Ofer Vilenski who argued that this has always been part of the agreement with Hola's free users when signing up for the service. After Brennan emailed the company, Hola modified its FAQ to include a notice that its users are acting as exit nodes for paid users of Hola's sister service Luminati. Other criticism stemmed from vulnerabilities inherent to the software, which could allow an attacker to deliver malware to Hola users. The Hola browser has also been used for distributed denial of service attacks.

In response to the criticism, Vilenski told Business Insider, "[we have been] listening to the conversations about Hola and while we think we've been clear about what we are doing, we have decided to provide more details about how this works, and thus the changes [to the website] in the past 24 hours". According to the security researchers who performed the audit, Hola updated its software but some of the vulnerabilities remained as of 1 June 2015.

In November 2016, Hola reached 100 million users. In August 2017, Hola sold a majority stake in Luminati to EMK Capital, a UK private equity investment firm. The deal was potentially valued at $200 million, with Hola founders retaining some stake in Luminati and Vilenski remaining as CEO of the Luminati. In 2019, the final purchase price was revealed to be $125 million in exchange for 75.6% of the company's shares with the company evaluated at $165 million.

In March 2021, the company changed its brand name from Luminati to Bright Data.

== Platforms ==
Hola is distributed as a set of browser extensions for Microsoft Edge, and Opera, as well as applications for Microsoft Windows and macOS, Android, and iOS.

== See also ==
- Comparison of virtual private network services
