= John McSherry =

American baseball umpire (1944–1996)

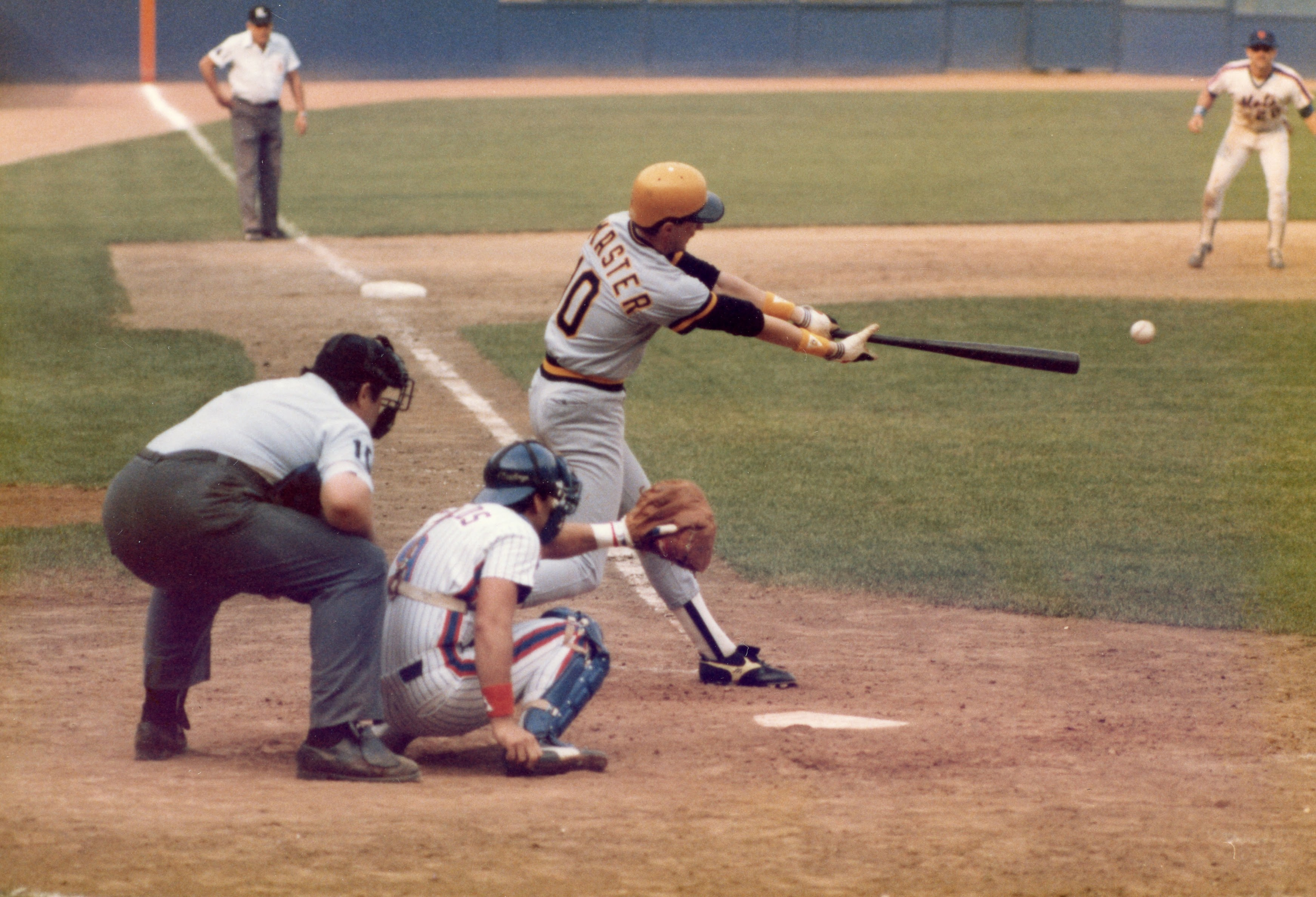
- McSherry as home plate umpire for a 1985 Johnnie LeMaster at-bat
- Born: September 11, 1944; New York City, U.S.
- Died: April 1, 1996 (aged 51); Cincinnati, Ohio, U.S.
- Resting place: Gate of Heaven Cemetery (Hawthorne, New York)
- Education: St. John's University (New York City)
- Occupation: MLB umpire
- Years active: 1971–1996

John Patrick McSherry (September 11, 1944 – April 1, 1996) was an American umpire in Major League Baseball who worked in the National League from 1971 until his death. McSherry wore uniform number 9 when he entered the National League, then wore number 10 from 1979 through the rest of his career. A respected umpire and crew chief, McSherry was officially listed at 6 feet 2 inches (1.88 m) and 328 pounds (149 kg). On April 1, 1996, the opening day of the 1996 Major League Baseball season, McSherry suffered a fatal heart attack while calling a game in Cincinnati.

== Early life ==
McSherry was baptized at St. Nicholas of Tolentine Church in the Bronx, where he grew up. McSherry played baseball at St. Nicholas of Tolentine High School. His high school coach advised him to go into umpiring if he wanted to continue in baseball. He enrolled at St. John's University after high school on an academic scholarship but left after two years to attend umpiring school.

== Umpiring career ==
McSherry's "primary tutor" as a young umpire was Tom Gorman. He debuted as a Major League umpire on June 1, 1971, as the third base umpire during a game between the Atlanta Braves and Houston Astros at Atlanta Stadium. On July 4, 1972, he ejected Astros manager Harry Walker from a game for arguing that Pittsburgh Pirates batter Al Oliver had failed to touch first base on a double. It was McSherry's first ejection on the Major League level. He was promoted to crew chief in July 1988.

=== Post-season games ===
McSherry umpired in the World Series in 1977 and 1987. He also officiated in the National League Championship Series in 1974, 1978, 1983, 1984, 1985, 1988, 1990, and 1992, and in the National League Division Series in 1981 and 1995.

McSherry removed himself from the seventh game of the 1992 National League Championship Series in the second inning due to illness.

=== All-Star Games ===
McSherry worked the 1975, 1982, and 1991 All-Star Games, for which the umpiring crew consisted of three American League umpires and three National League umpires during the years 1949 to 1999.

=== Other notable games ===
- Home plate umpire during the game on May 4, 1975, where Houston Astros first baseman Bob Watson scored MLB's one millionth run in a game against the San Francisco Giants at Candlestick Park. Watson reached the milestone by scoring on a three-run homer by Milt May.
- Home plate umpire for no-hitter thrown by Houston Astros right-hander Larry Dierker on July 9, 1976, at Houston.
- Home plate umpire for the sixth and final game of the 1977 World Series, in which Yankees slugger Reggie Jackson belted three home runs off three different Los Angeles Dodgers pitchers at Yankee Stadium on the way to an 8–4 victory. After Jackson's first home run off Burt Hooton, Dodgers manager Tommy Lasorda came to the mound to make a pitching change, trotting slowly so as to get his bullpen more ready. Lasorda asked McSherry who he should summon from the bullpen; playing along with evident stalling, McSherry suggested that Lasorda go with right-hander Elías Sosa. Sosa gave up Jackson's second home run in the fifth inning. Knuckleballer Charlie Hough gave up the third shot in the eighth inning.
- First base umpire during the August 12, 1984, game between the San Diego Padres and the Atlanta Braves, which featured several brawls and resulted in multiple ejections. While McSherry did not eject anyone directly (home plate umpire Steve Rippley did), he ordered the benches cleared and all reserve players back to their dressing rooms in the ninth inning.
- Home plate umpire during June 23, 1986 Chicago Cubs/Philadelphia Phillies game at Veterans Stadium, where the Phillies set an NL record with 15 extra-base hits in a 19–1 rout of the Cubs. The hits were four home runs and eleven doubles. Second baseman Juan Samuel had a pair of three-run home runs.
- First base umpire during a Cubs/Astros game that saw a record 53 players used in an eighteen-inning game that began on September 2, 1986, and ended the next day.
- Started off behind the plate of Game 7 of the 1992 National League Championship Series but had to leave in the early innings because of dizziness.

== Death ==
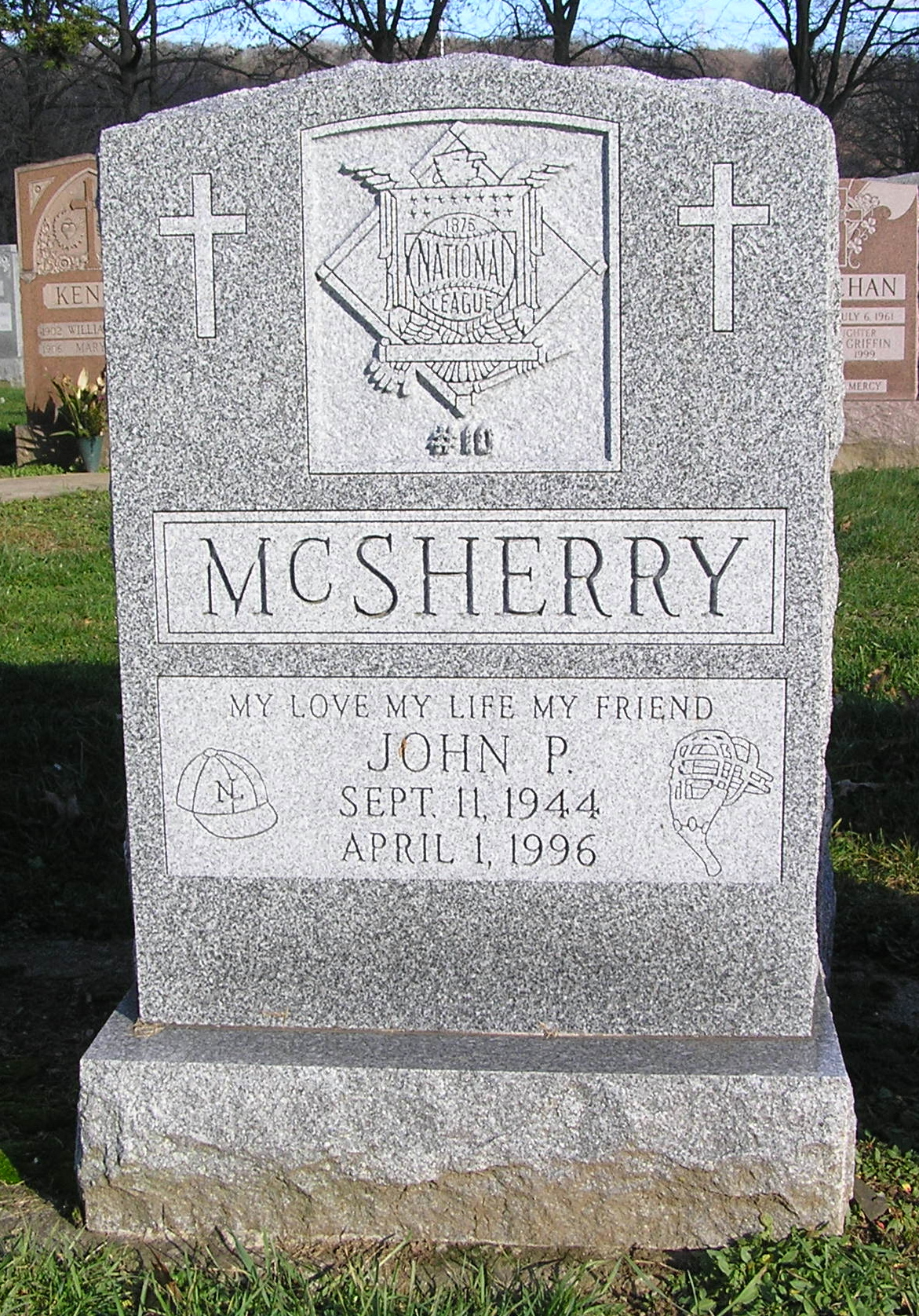
McSherry's headstone in Gate of Heaven Cemetery

On April 1, 1996, the Cincinnati Reds and Montreal Expos were playing an Opening Day game, and McSherry was the home plate umpire. Seven pitches into the game, McSherry called a timeout, spoke briefly to Reds catcher Eddie Taubensee, then walked towards the tunnel behind home plate that leads to the umpires' dressing room. Moments after signaling for the second base umpire to come in and replace him, McSherry stumbled forward and collapsed face-first onto the warning track in front of the tunnel door. Resuscitative efforts were begun on McSherry and he was taken to University Hospital in Cincinnati, but was pronounced dead on arrival. He was 51 years old.

Because third-base umpire Tom Hallion had followed the ambulance to the hospital, the remaining two umpires, Steve Rippley and Jerry Crawford, had to decide whether to proceed with the game. Shaken and tearful players on both teams consoled the grieving umpires, and the umpires decided to postpone the game. Reds manager Ray Knight recalled a comment from shortstop Barry Larkin: "Barry told me very quietly and with very much emotion: 'Ray, I've had a lot of deaths in my family. In good conscience, out of respect for life, I can't go out there.'"

Cincinnati Reds owner Marge Schott said, "Snow this morning and now this. I don't believe it. I feel cheated. This isn't supposed to happen to us, not in Cincinnati. This is our history, our tradition, our team. Nobody feels worse than me." Schott's statement was criticized as a public gaffe, though supporters contended that she was thinking of the some 50,000 fans who had expected to see a baseball game and might be unable to attend a makeup game. Schott sent flowers to the umpires' dressing room; the Dayton Daily News later reported that the flowers had been given to Schott on Opening Day by Reds television partner SportsChannel Ohio, and had been regifted with a handwritten sympathy note.

The game was resumed the following day, with the Reds winning 4–1 over the Expos. Rich Rieker joined the umpiring crew as an emergency replacement at third base.

An autopsy revealed that McSherry had suffered a massive heart attack, caused by severe coronary artery disease. He went into cardiac arrest when he collapsed during the game. McSherry had dealt with health issues prior to this one, including leaving a few games due to dizziness and dehydration in the early 1990s.

According to Richie Phillips, the head of the Major League Umpires Association, McSherry weighed closer to 380 pounds (170 kg) than his listed weight of 328 pounds (149 kg) and was particularly vulnerable to job-related stress. Phillips recalled a moment when he was in the umpires' locker room talking with others and seeing McSherry "sitting by himself in a corner, putting on his shinguards, and he broke out in a huge sweat." According to Phillips, at the request of the league, McSherry spent multiple offseasons attending weight-loss programs at Duke University, but once the season began, he habitually regained whatever weight he had lost, made worse because he also had bad knees. As far back as 1983, Joe Garagiola was quoted in The New York Times as saying "It looks like [McSherry is] getting all the meal money." In 1984, Steve Wulf had written in Sports Illustrated that McSherry "makes your average sumo wrestler look like Freddie Patek."

More than 1,000 people attended McSherry's funeral Mass at St. Nicholas of Tolentine Church in the Bronx, the same church in which he was baptized. About 200 people attended his burial at Gate of Heaven Cemetery in Valhalla, New York.

== Aftermath ==
It was later revealed McSherry had a doctor's appointment scheduled for the day after his death; McSherry had been diagnosed with a cardiac arrhythmia. After the incident, Major League Baseball compelled its umpires to be more physically fit. National League umpire Eric Gregg, a friend of McSherry, made an effort to lose excess weight via exercise and diet, but resigned after the 1999 season in a dispute with MLB and subsequently died at age 55 due to a stroke in 2006.

The New York Mets honored McSherry's memory by embroidering "J.M. N.L. Umpire 10" in a home plate crossed by two baseball bats on the right sleeves of their 1996 game jerseys. In memory of McSherry, the Reds dedicated Riverfront Stadium's umpires' dressing room to him, and the National League retired his number 10.

== See also ==
- List of Major League Baseball umpires (disambiguation)
