= Derrick Phelps =

American basketball player and coach (born 1972)

Fordham Rams
- Title: Assistant coach
- League: Atlantic 10 Conference

Personal information
- Born: July 31, 1972 (age 54) Queens, New York, U.S.
- Listed height: 6 ft 4 in (1.93 m)
- Listed weight: 181 lb (82 kg)

Career information
- High school: Christ the King (Queens, New York)
- College: North Carolina (1990–1994)
- NBA draft: 1994: undrafted
- Playing career: 1994–2010
- Position: Point guard
- Number: 5
- Coaching career: 2011–present

Career history

Playing
- 1994–1995: Chicago Rockers
- 1995: Sacramento Kings
- 1995–1996: Chicago Rockers
- 1996–1997: Brose Baskets
- 1997–1998: La Crosse Bobcats
- 1998: Rockford Lightning
- 1998–2000: Telekom Bonn
- 2000–2002: Alba Berlin
- 2002–2003: Limoges CSP
- 2003–2004: EnBW Ludwigsburg
- 2004: Śląsk Wrocław
- 2004–2005: EiffelTowers
- 2005–2006: Brose Baskets
- 2006–2007: Spartak Primorye
- 2009–2010: Gaz Metan Mediaş

Coaching
- 2011–2014: Monmouth (assistant)
- 2014–2016: Columbia (assistant)
- 2016–2019: San Francisco (AHC)
- 2019–2022: Washington State (assistant)
- 2023–2024: Marist (assistant)
- 2024–2025: LIU (assistant)
- 2025-present: Fordham (assistant)

Career highlights
- As player: 2× German League champion (2001, 2002); German League MVP (2001); CBA All-Rookie First Team (1995); NCAA champion (1993); Second-team All-ACC (1994); Second-team Parade All-American (1990); McDonald's All-American (1990); As assistant coach: CIT Tournament winner (2016)
- Stats at NBA.com
- Stats at Basketball Reference

Derrick Michael Phelps (born July 31, 1972) is an American basketball coach and former player, who is currently an assistant coach at Fordham University.

== High school ==
Phelps attended Christ The King Regional High School, in Middle Village, Queens, New York. He was named to the 1990 McDonald's All-American Team. After, he played in the McDonald's All-American game with future UNC teammates Eric Montross, Brian Reese, and Clifford Rozier.

== College career ==
Phelps rose to prominence while playing college basketball for coach Dean Smith at the University of North Carolina, with the Tar Heels. He was named as an All-Atlantic Coast Conference Honorable Mention in 1993, and was named to the 2nd Team in 1994. Phelps was a member of North Carolina's 1993 NCAA National Championship team, as the Tar Heels defeated Michigan, by a score of 77–71, in the title game. Graduating in 1994, Phelps left college holding two Tar Heel records: most steals in one game (9), and most steals in a career (247). He was also the only player in ACC history with 600 assists, 400 rebounds, and 200 steals.

== Professional playing career ==
Phelps was not drafted by an NBA team. He was the sixth overall pick of the 1994 Continental Basketball Association (CBA) draft, by the Chicago Rockers. Phelps was selected to the CBA All-Rookie Team in 1995. He did play in three NBA games with the Sacramento Kings in the 1994–95 season. The Vancouver Grizzlies selected him in the 1995 NBA expansion draft, but he did not play for them before they renounced his NBA rights in 1996. He also spent some time during the NBA preseason (but not in any regular season contests) with the Milwaukee Bucks (1994), and Philadelphia 76ers (1997).

In 1996, Phelps signed with the German team TTL uniVersa Bamberg, before playing for the CBA's Rockford Lightning.

From 2000 to 2002, he played with the German club ALBA Berlin, with former UNC teammate Henrik Rödl (having already played with the German club Telekom Baskets Bonn in 1998–2000). He then played in France with CSP Limoges, then returned to Germany, and had a brief stint in 2004, with Śląsk Wrocław in the Polish League.

Phelps also played in the Netherlands, in Germany with GHP Bamberg, and in the Russian Super League with Spartak Primorie Vladivostok.

In the 2009–10 season, he played with Gaz Metan Medias in the Romanian League.

== Coaching career ==
In October 2010, Phelps was named the video coordinator for Fordham University's men's basketball team. In 2011, he joined the Monmouth University staff as an assistant coach. Prior to the start of the 2014 season, he accepted a position as an assistant coach at Columbia University.

Phelps later left Columbia to become an associate head coach at San Francisco for three seasons, before following Kyle Smith to Washington State after the 2018–19 season, at which he was again an assistant coach. He stepped down from the position in June 2022.

Six months later, Phelps returned to Monmouth and became a special assistant to the head coach. Phelps held this position for six months before joining the Marist coaching staff as an assistant coach.

In 2025, it was announced that Phelps would return to Fordham as an assistant coach.
