= St. Nicholas of Tolentine High School =

Former high school in The Bronx, New York

Location
- 2336 Andrews Avenue; Bronx, New York 10468; United States; 40.8622637784035°N 73.9069058825537°W

Information
- School type: Parochial
- Motto: Latin: Ad Astra per Aspera (To the Stars Through Adversity)
- Religious affiliation: Roman Catholic
- Patron saint: St. Nicholas of Tolentine
- Established: 1927
- Status: Closed
- Closed: June 14, 1991 (35 years ago)
- Principal: Sr. Rose Ellen Gorman (1991)
- Faculty: 22 (1991)
- Grades: 9–12
- Enrollment: 330 (1991); 700 (c. 1970s)
- Student to teacher ratio: 15:1 (1991)
- Campus type: Urban
- Nickname: Wildcats
- Yearbook: The Tolentia; Tolentimes; The Tolentian
- Annual tuition: $2,350 (1991)
- Graduates (1991): 68
- Affiliation: St. Nicholas of Tolentine Church

St. Nicholas of Tolentine High School was a four-year, coeducational Catholic high school located in the University Heights neighborhood of the Bronx, New York. A parochial school operated by the parish of the same name, St. Nicholas of Tolentine Church, it opened in 1927 and closed in 1991, after years of declining enrollment. The final class of 68 students graduated on June 14, 1991.

The school was known for its basketball program. In 1975, Tolentine had the city's top-ranked high school basketball team. It won the Catholic High School Athletic Association basketball championship in 1980–1982 and 1988.

== Notable alumni ==
Former basketball stars include National Basketball Association players Gary Voce and Malik Sealy as well as college basketball coaches Brian Reese and Adrian Autry. Major League Baseball umpire John McSherry attended the school and played for its baseball team. Finbarr O'Neill, former CEO of J.D. Power, Hyundai Motor America and Mitsubishi Motors North America was also an alumnus.
