= Finbarr O'Neill (businessman) =

American automobile industry executive

- Born: Cookstown, Northern Ireland
- Education: Columbia University (BA), Fordham University (JD), California State University, Dominguez Hills (MBA)
- Occupation: Business executive
- Known for: Former CEO of J.D. Power

Finbarr O'Neill is an American automobile industry executive. He is chairman of APCO Holdings and former CEO of J.D. Power.

Earlier in his career he also served as the chief executive of Hyundai Motor America and Mitsubishi Motors North America.

== Early life ==
O'Neill was born on a farm in Cookstown in Northern Ireland. He emigrated to the United States with his family when he was 10 years old and grew up in the Bronx. He attended St. Nicholas of Tolentine High School, received his B.A. in political science from Columbia University and his J.D. from Fordham University School of Law. He also earned an MBA from California State University, Dominguez Hills.

== Career ==
O'Neill worked as an associate at law firm Skadden, Arps, Slate, Meagher & Flom after law school. He then served as senior counsel at Toyota Motor Sales, USA, before joining Hyundai Motor Company as general counsel in 1985.

He became president and CEO of Hyundai Motor America in 1998 after serving as the company's chief legal officer for 13 years. As president, he instituted a 10-year, 100,000-mile warranty, among the most generous in the industry, and changed the company's lineup and introduced new models such as the Hyundai Santa Fe, causing sales to surge 82 percent in its first year and 49 percent in 2000. During his tenure, sales rose from 90,000 in 1998 to more than 360,000 in 2002. He was credited for transforming the company from near extinction to a significant challenger in the market for lower-priced vehicles.

In 2003, O'Neill became president and CEO of Mitsubishi Motors North America before stepping down in 2005 to become CEO of dealership-management software provider Reynolds & Reynolds.

He joined J.D. Power in 2008 as senior vice president and general manager of international operations. In November 2008, he became president of J.D. Power. He served as CEO for 10 years and retired in March 2018.

O'Neill joined the board and became Chairman of APCO Holdings, LLC in 2019.
