= 1990 McDonald's All-American Boys Game =

American high school basketball game

East	West
115	104
	1st half	2nd half	Total
East	49	66	115
West	52	52	104
- Date: April 15, 1990
- Venue: Market Square Arena, Indianapolis, IN
- MVP: Shawn Bradley and Khalid Reeves
- Referees: 1; 2; 3
- Attendance: 12,033
- Network: ABC
- Announcers: Gary Bender and Dick Vitale

McDonald's All-American

The 1990 McDonald's All-American Boys Game was an All-star basketball game played on Sunday, April 15, 1990, at the Market Square Arena in Indianapolis. The game's rosters featured the best and most highly recruited high school boys graduating in 1990. The game was the 13th annual version of the McDonald's All-American Game first played in 1978.

== 1990 game ==
The game was telecast live for the last time by ABC. In 1991, CBS became the telecaster. The rosters were characterized by promising centers, especially three taller than 7 ft: Eric Montross, Luther Wright and Shawn Bradley; Bradley, with his 7-6 frame, was the tallest player to ever appear in the McDonald's game up to that point. Other highly regarded prospects were forwards Grant Hill and Ed O'Bannon and guards Khalid Reeves and Derrick Phelps (who were teammates at Christ the King). Bradley and Reeves were named co-MVPs: Bradley had 12 points, 10 rebounds and 6 blocks, confirming his ability as a shot-blocker; Reeves scored 22 points and recorded 10 steals, the highest of the history of McDonald's All-American Games (a record which still stands as of 2018). Other players who starred were Adrian Autry (8 points and 11 assists), Eric Montross, Clifford Rozier, Anthony Cade, Grant Hill and Ed O'Bannon. Of the 20 players, 13 went on to play at least 1 game in the NBA.

=== East roster ===
No.	Name	Height	Weight	Position	Hometown	High school	College of Choice
4	Khalid Reeves	6-4	190	G	Middle Village, NY, U.S.	Christ the King	Arizona
5	Derrick Phelps	6-3	160	G	Middle Village, NY, U.S.	Christ the King	North Carolina
12	Adrian Autry	6-4	195	G	Bronx, NY, U.S.	St. Nicholas of Tolentine	Syracuse
15	Bill Curley	6-9	220	C	Duxbury, MA, U.S.	Duxbury	Boston College
22	Luther Wright	7-2	295	C	Elizabeth, NJ, U.S.	Elizabeth	Seton Hall
31	Brian Reese	6-6	205	F	Bronx, NY, U.S.	St. Nicholas of Tolentine	North Carolina
32	Michael Smith	6-8	215	F	Washington, D.C., U.S.	Dunbar	Providence
44	Clifford Rozier	6-10	240	F	Bradenton, FL, U.S.	Southeast	North Carolina
50	Dwayne Morton	6-6	185	F	Louisville, KY, U.S.	Central	Undecided; Committed later to Louisville.
54	Rodney Rogers	6-7	230	F	Durham, NC, U.S.	Hillside	Wake Forest

=== West roster ===
No.	Name	Height	Weight	Position	Hometown	High school	College of Choice
00	Eric Montross	7-0	245	C	Indianapolis, IN, U.S.	Lawrence North	North Carolina
22	Kendrick Warren	6-8	196	F	Richmond, VA, U.S.	Thomas Jefferson	Undecided; Committed later to VCU.
23	Jamie Brandon	6-4	200	G	Chicago, IL, U.S.	Martin Luther King	Illinois
30	Grant Hill	6-8	210	F	Reston, VA, U.S.	South Lakes	Duke
31	Ed O'Bannon	6-8	210	F	Lakewood, CA, U.S.	Artesia	Undecided; Committed later to UCLA.
32	Damon Bailey	6-3	190	G	Bedford, IN, U.S.	Bedford North Lawrence	Indiana
33	Darrin Hancock	6-6	205	G	Griffin, GA, U.S.	Griffin	Undecided; Committed later to UNLV.
34	Melvin Simon	6-8	240	C	Marrero, LA, U.S.	Archbishop Shaw	New Orleans
44	Anthony Cade	6-9	210	F	Mouth of Wilson, VA, U.S.	Oak Hill Academy	Louisville
45	Shawn Bradley	7-6	210	C	Castle Dale, UT, U.S.	Emery County	Brigham Young

=== Coaches ===
The East team was coached by:

- Head Coach Vito Montelli of St. Joseph High School (Trumbull, Connecticut)
- Asst Coach James Olayos of St. Joseph High School (Trumbull, Connecticut)

The West team was coached by:

- Head Coach Norm Held of Anderson High School (Anderson, Indiana)
- Asst Coach Dick Maynard of Anderson High School (Anderson, Indiana)
- Asst Coach Troy Lewis of Anderson High School (Anderson, Indiana)

== All-American Week ==
=== Contest winners ===
- The 1990 Slam Dunk contest was won by Darrin Hancock.
- The 1990 3-point shoot-out was won by Adrian Autry.
