= Habiger =

Habiger is a surname. Notable people with the surname include:

- Dave Habiger (born 1969), American businessman and entrepreneur
- Eugene E. Habiger (born 1939), United States Air Force general
