= Adrian Autry =

American basketball coach (born 1972)

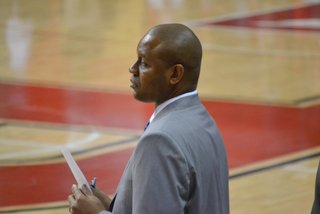
- Autry in 2012

Current position
- Title: Assistant coach
- Team: Virginia
- Conference: ACC

Biographical details
- Born: February 28, 1972 (age 54); Monroe, North Carolina, U.S.
- Education: Syracuse University; St. Nicholas of Tolentine High School

Playing career
- 1990–1994: Syracuse
- Position: Point guard

Coaching career (HC unless noted)
- 2006–2007: Bishop Ireton HS (associate HC)
- 2007–2008: Paul VI HS (assistant)
- 2010–2011: Virginia Tech (assistant)
- 2011–2016: Syracuse (assistant)
- 2016–2023: Syracuse (associate HC)
- 2023–2026: Syracuse
- 2026–present: Virginia (assistant)

Administrative career (AD unless noted)
- 2008–2010: Virginia Tech (director of basketball ops.)

Head coaching record
- Overall: 49–48 (.505)

Adrian "Red" Christopher Autry (born February 28, 1972) is an American basketball coach and former professional player who is currently an assistant coach for the Virginia Cavaliers men's basketball team. Previously, he served as the head coach for the Syracuse Orange men's basketball team of the Atlantic Coast Conference (ACC).

A former point guard for the Orange, Autry played from 1990 to 1994 and is currently ranked fifth in career assists (631) and sixth in career steals (217). After leaving Syracuse, Autry played professionally from 1995 to 2005 in various European leagues and USA Basketball.

After a 10-year career, Autry retired in 2005 and returned to the states to begin his career as a coach. He coached various teams in Virginia and returned to the Orange in 2011 as an assistant coach. In March 2023, Autry was named the eighth head coach of the Syracuse men's basketball team following the retirement of longtime head coach Jim Boeheim. He was fired from Syracuse in March 2026.

== Personal life ==
Autry was born in Monroe, North Carolina on February 29, 1972, to Angeter Redfearn and Marvin Chambers. Autry, his mother and his sister moved to Harlem, New York when he was five years old and lived there until he went to college. Autry has two sisters and one brother.

== High school ==
Autry attended St. Nicholas of Tolentine High School in The Bronx, New York. Autry was a standout basketball player in high school. He was a three-year starter and earned All-City First Team honors three times. While in high school, his squad won the New York City and New York state championships in 1988, the same year they were named the number one high school program in the nation. Autry was a Parade All-American in 1989 and 1990, named to the first-team All-New York City in 1988, 1989 and 1990, and was a 1990 McDonald's All-American. Autry also played in the Dapper Dan Roundball Classic and the 1990 U.S. Olympic Festival. Autry was teammates with Malik Sealy and current Monmouth University assistant men's basketball coach and UNC Tar Heels graduate Brian Reese.

== College ==
Autry was recruited by Louisville, Kentucky, St. John's, and Pitt. Autry ultimately chose Syracuse University and began in the fall of 1990. Autry, a 6-foot-4 four-year starting point guard, played under Jim Boeheim and graduated in 1994 with a degree in speech communications from the College of Visual and Performing Arts.

In the freshman 1990–91 season, Autry led the team with 164 assists. In his first season, the Orange had a record of 26–6 and won the Big East Regular Season Title. Autry was named to the Big East Conference All-Rookie Team. In Autry's sophomore season, he led the squad in assists (123) and steals (48) while averaging 11ppg. The team won the Big East tournament. As a junior, Autry's scoring average jumped to 13.7 ppg. He once again led the team in assists (161) and steals (58). Autry was selected to the third-team All-Big East, and was also named to the Big East All-Tournament Team. He was teammates with Billy Owens, Lawrence Moten.

Autry had a great senior year. He was chosen to the first-team All-BIG EAST after averaging 16.7 ppg and 6.1 assists. The Orange made it to the Sweet 16 of the NCAA tournament. In that game, Autry set an NCAA-school record 31 second-half points in the overtime loss to Missouri. Autry ended his college career as one of only three players to lead SU in seasons assists four times, and still ranks fifth in career assists (631), sixth in career steals (217), 17th on the all-time scoring list (1,538) and eighth in career minutes played (4,037).

== USA Basketball ==
Autry was one of twelve men selected to the 1993 FIBA 22 & Under World Championship games held in Burgos, Palencia, Valladolid, Spain between July 22–31, 1993. The team had a perfect 8–0 record and captured the gold medal in the Young Men World Championship. Autry played alongside Eddie Jones, Theo Ratliff, Corliss Williamson, Bill Curley and other talented Division I players. The team was coached by Mike Jarvis.

== Professional career ==
After college, Autry pursued a professional basketball career. He was undrafted in the NBA but had several workouts and played on the Summer Team. Autry enjoyed a more lucrative career overseas. Autry spent one year (1995–1996) playing with Besiktas Istanbul, and then spent three seasons in Germany playing for SSV Ulm 1846. With Ulm, Autry and his team were the runners-up in the 1998 German Cup. Autry still holds the 1998–1999 records for points (504), assists (116), and steals (65) and was named to the All-German Imports First Team in 1999.

After Germany, Autry headed to Italy where he played with Sicc BPA Jesi (1999–2000), Paf Bologna (2000–2001) where they lost in the Italian Championships to Kinder Bologna, Fabriano Basket (2001), and Mabo Livorno (2002). In 2002, Autry began playing in France for SLUC Nancy Basket at the end of their season. He replaced an injured player. At the beginning of the next season, Autry was re-signed by SLUC Nancy and played there during the (2002–2003) season. During the 2003–2004 season, Autry started out playing for Brandt Hagen. However, the team folded and Autry took his talents to Russia, where he played in Siberia at Lokomotiv Novosibirsk. At the completion of that season, Autry found his next job in Belgium playing for Verviers-Pepinster and ended his career playing in Poland with Deichman Śląsk Wrocław. He also played for the USBL. Autry retired in 2005.

== Coaching career ==
In 2006, Autry and his family moved to Northern Virginia, where he held jobs at UPS and in real estate.

He began his coaching career as the associate head coach at Bishop Ireton High School. In the spring of 2007, Autry became involved in the AAU circuit, by becoming the coach of the 14-Under squad with NOVA United. During the 2007–2008 school year, Autry was named an assistant coach at Paul VI Catholic High School. In 2008, Autry switched AAU teams and became an assistant coach for the 17-Under AAU squad Team Takeover.

In the fall of 2008, Autry was hired by Virginia Tech's men's basketball head coach Seth Greenberg as the Director of Basketball Operations. Autry held that position for two years and was then promoted to assistant basketball coach for the Hokies. In the spring of 2010, Autry was on his way to the University of Dayton to become the associate head coach under Archie Miller. However, he never made it there. A position with his alma mater Syracuse University became available when Rob Murphy was named the head coach at Eastern Michigan University. Autry quickly accepted the position.

In 2012, he was named the fifth best assistant coach by ESPN, and was noted for his strong recruiting ties to the D.C. and DMV area. After departure of Mike Hopkins in March 2017, Autry was promoted to associate head coach job. He coached the forwards and recruited all positions and worked closely with eventual NBA draft picks Jerami Grant, Rakeem Christmas, Oshae Brissett, Tyler Lydon, and Chris McCullough.

In 2019, Autry was named the head coach of USA East Coast Basketball, a team of college players that competed in a summer tour of Greece.

On March 8, 2023, following longtime head coach Jim Boeheim's departure after 47 years, Autry was promoted to head coach. He was the eighth head coach in the 119-year history of Syracuse men's basketball. He was fired from that position in March 2026.

== Personal life ==
Autry lives in Jamesville, New York with his wife, Andrea. The couple have four children, two of them being graduates of Syracuse University. His nickname is Red for his complexion and hair color.

== Statistics ==
Year	GP	Min	FG	FGA	3PT	FT	FTA	Rebs	Asts	PTS	Stls	Blocks	TOs	PPG	APG	RPG
1990–91	31	1030	106	264	26	62	88	79	164	300	62	4	112	9.7	5.3	2.6
1991–92	31	1014	109	207	33	90	128	126	123	341	48	6	102	11	4.0	4.1
1992–93	29	921	140	324	33	83	104	106	161	396	58	5	115	13.7	5.6	3.7
1993–94	30	1072	178	396	47	98	125	145	183	501	49	10	115	16.7	6.1	4.8
TOTALS	121	4037	533	1281	139	333	445	456	631	1538	217	25	431	12.7	5.2	3.8

== Head coaching record ==
Record table
Season	Team	Overall	Conference	Standing	Postseason
Syracuse Orange (Atlantic Coast Conference) (2023–2026)
2023–24	Syracuse	20–12	11–9	T–5th	
2024–25	Syracuse	14–19	7–13	14th	
2025–26	Syracuse	15–17	6–12	14th	
Syracuse:		49–48 (.505)	24–34 (.414)		
Total:		49–48 (.505)			
National champion Postseason invitational champion Conference regular season champion Conference regular season and conference tournament champion Division regular season champion Division regular season and conference tournament champion Conference tournament champion
