= Abe Peled =

American and Israeli businessman

- אייב פלד
- Occupations: Electrical engineer, technical officer, research officer, chairman (currently)

Abe Peled (Hebrew: אייב פלד) is an American and Israeli businessman.

== Biography ==
Abraham (Abe) Peled was born in Romania. He graduated from the Technion with BSc, and MSc in 1967 and 1971 respectively, both degrees in electrical engineering. He did his graduate work at Princeton University in the US on Digital Signal Processing and got his PhD in 1974. From 1967 to 1971 Peled was a technical officer in the Israeli Army Signal Corps. From 1974 to 1993 Peled worked for IBM's Research Division in the United States, initially as a research scientist and later in research management, his last position was vice president for systems and software, with management responsibility for all worldwide research and advanced development activities in the IBM Research Division. In December 1991 he was featured in the cover story of the NY Times Sunday business section for his innovative internal start-up on the Power Visualization System. From 1993 to 1995 Peled served as senior vice president for business development at Elron in Israel, where he started the first Internet ISP, and e-commerce sites in Israel.

Until July 2012, Peled was chairman and chief executive officer of NDS Group Ltd., a provider of technology for the pay TV industry. He was appointed to this position in 1995 and during his tenure the company has expanded rapidly and grown twenty fivefold to a $1B in sales, achieving an over 35% market share in the global digital technology for pay TV industry; a proportion of this growth, approximately 35% of revenues, has resulted from being News Corporation's in-house technology provider and the continuing success of that company's pay TV strategy. NDS was a public company listed on NASDAQ: NNDS between November 1999 to February 2009, and was taken private in February 2009 at a $3.6B valuation, and is now jointly owned by Permira, the majority shareholder, and News Corporation. In July 2012 Cisco acquired NDS Group Ltd. for $5B. From July 2012 to January 2014 Peled served as a Senior Vice President Strategy in Cisco's Video and Collaboration Group. In December 2014 Peled was appointed Chairman of [TeamViewer] by [Permira] who acquired [TeamViewer] for €1B. He led the transformation of [TeamViewer] which grew rapidly from €100M to over €500M and went public on the Frankfurt Stock Exchange at a €5B valuation in September 2019. Peled was appointed chairman of the supervisory board. In 2018 [Permira] acquired the video assets which included previously acquired [NDS] and named the new company [Synamedia] and Peled was appointed chairman.he resigned that position in June 2021.

Peled is currently deputy chairman of the supervisory board of [TeamViewer], Chairman of [ARMO] an Israeli cybersecurity start-up, Member of the advisory board of BlueVoyant, and a partner in CyberCloud Ventures – an investment company he founded.
