= Bright Data =

Israeli information technology company

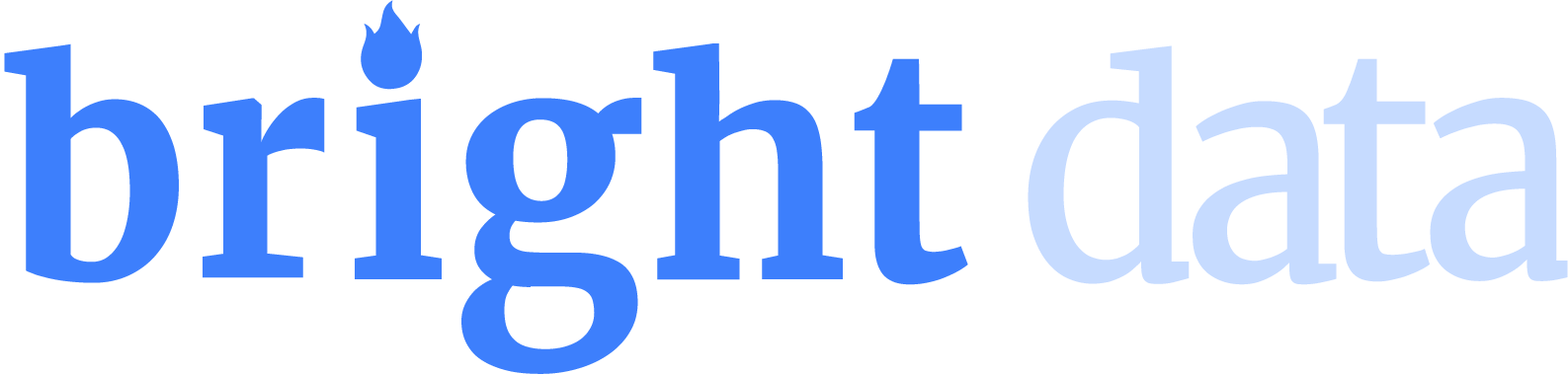
- Type: Private
- Industry: Data collection and proxy services
- Founded: 2014
- Headquarters: Tel Aviv, Israel
- Key people: Or Lenchner (CEO)
- Number of employees: 201-500
- Website: brightdata.com

Bright Data (formerly Luminati Networks) is a global technology company that offers web data collection and proxy services.

== History ==
The company was founded under the name Luminati Networks as a division of the Hola VPN company in 2014. Luminati Networks was used to sell access to Hola's userbase as exit nodes, charging $20 per gigabyte for bandwidth that was coming from their free VPN users. This was confirmed by Hola founder Ofer Vilenski, who stated that this was always part of the agreement with Hola's free users when signing up for the service. After 8chan founder Fredrick Brennan emailed the company, Hola modified its FAQ to include a notice that users of Hola's free service are acting as exit nodes for paid users of Luminati's service.

In 2017, Luminati Networks was sold separately from Hola to EMK Capital, a private investment fund from London, at a value of approximately 200 million dollars. In March 2021, Luminati Networks was renamed to Bright Data.

In May 2021, Bright Data founded an organization called The Bright Initiative with the aim of making data available at no cost to non-profits, organizations and research bodies. The organization serves more than 700 companies, including 300 academic institutions.

In September 2022, the company acquired the Israeli start-up Market Beyond, which analyzes e-commerce data based on artificial intelligence.

In June 2023, Bright Data joined the Amazon Web Services ISV Accelerate program.

In October 2023, Bright Data, in collaboration with the Molly Rose Foundation charity, released a research report titled "Preventable yet Pervasive: The Prevalence and Characteristics of Harmful Content, Including Suicide and Self-Harm Material, on Instagram, TikTok, and Pinterest." This study provided insights into the extent and nature of harmful content on these social media platforms.

=== Litigation ===
In July 2018, Bright Data sued another proxy service provider, Oxylabs, for patent infringement. A jury initially awarded $7.5 million in damages to Bright Data, although another judge followed that ruling by ordering the companies to undergo mediation.

In January 2023, Bright Data was sued by Meta Platforms for harvesting and selling data scraped from Facebook and Instagram. Meta previously hired Bright Data to scrape data from other websites. In January 2024, Bright Data won the dispute with Meta, where a federal judge in San Francisco declared that the company did not breach Meta's terms of use by scraping data from Facebook and Instagram, consequently denying Meta's request for summary judgment on claims of contract breach.

In July 2023, X Corp, formerly known as Twitter, sued Bright Data for scraping data from Twitter, violating its terms of service. Bright Data countersued, asserting its commitment to making public data accessible, claiming legality in its web data collection practices. In May 2024, a federal judge dismissed the suit, ruling that Bright Data did not violate X's terms of service or copyright by scraping publicly accessible data. The judge emphasized that such scraping practices are generally legal and that restricting them could lead to information monopolies, and highlighted that X's concerns were more about financial compensation than protecting user privacy.
