= Gary Voce =

American-Jamaican basketball player (born 1965)

Personal information
- Born: November 24, 1965 (age 60) Jamaica
- Listed height: 6 ft 9 in (2.06 m)
- Listed weight: 240 lb (109 kg)

Career information
- High school: St. Nicholas of Tolentine (Bronx, New York)
- College: Notre Dame (1984–1988)
- NBA draft: 1988: undrafted
- Position: Power forward
- Number: 54

Career history
- 1988–1989: Rapid City Thrillers
- 1989: Cleveland Cavaliers
- 1990: Westside Melbourne Saints
- 1990–1991: Tulsa Fast Breakers
- 1992–1993: Fargo-Moorhead Fever
- 1994–1995: Harrisburg Hammerheads
- Stats at NBA.com
- Stats at Basketball Reference

Gary Anthony Voce (born November 24, 1965) is an American-Jamaican former basketball player. He played collegiately at the University of Notre Dame.

A 6'9" and 240 lb forward, Voce had two stints with the Cleveland Cavaliers. He was a member of the team for three months during the 1988–89 season but did not appear in a regular season game. He was named to Cleveland's roster at the start of the following season to replace an injured Chris Dudley. He played in one regular season game for the Cavaliers in a 100–92 road loss against the Washington Bullets on November 10, 1989. He scored 2 points in 4 minutes. He was waived by the Cavaliers when Dudley returned from injury shortly thereafter. In 1990, he played for the Westside Melbourne Saints in the National Basketball League (NBL). Voce was playing for the Harrisburg Hammerheads of the Continental Basketball Association (CBA) when the team folded in 1996. He was not picked up by any other teams in the CBA's dispersal draft.
