= OpenBet =

British provider of sportsbook technology

- Industry: Software, Gambling
- Founded: February 2, 1996; 30 years ago
- Founder: Clive Haworth; James Caddy; Charles Malir
- Headquarters: Chiswick, London
- Area served: Chiswick, London; Athens, Greece; Sydney, Australia; Montreal, Canada
- Key people: Jordan Levin
- Owner: OB Global Holdings LLC
- Number of employees: over 750
- Subsidiaries: Neccton

OpenBet is a sportsbook technology, content and services provider that is owned by OB Global Holdings, LLC.

== Description ==
In 2020, OpenBet was the market leader in Canada where 80% of all digital sports bets were processed through its platform; in the same year in the UK, it accounted for 65%, and in Australia, 46%.

The OpenBet platform is licensed in 13 US states, and last year 40% of all bets in the country were carried out on its platform.

OpenBet develops front-end and back-office gaming products, including management and data analysis and reporting tools. Its platform is designed to allow users to bet and play in multiple languages and currencies across a range of products and platforms, including web, mobile, retail outlets, call centres and interactive television, with a single sign-on to a centralised OpenBet account.

== History ==
Orbis Technology Ltd was founded in February 1996 by Clive Haworth, James Caddy and Charles Malir. Its first sports betting application was released as Betonline through a City Index and Sporting Life joint venture in time for the 1998 World Cup.

In 1999 Orbis launched their OpenBet Casino at ICE and the Sky Vegas Live Roulette channel was launched. In December 2000, the company was acquired by NDS Group, a News Corporation company and a technology provider in digital television; that year, Ladbrokes, Surrey Sports and Paddy Power were live on OpenBet.

In September 2005, a year after David Loveday replaced Caddy as CEO, the firm acquired NT Media; three years later, it was Electracade's turn to be acquired. It was in a Sunday Times survey in 2010, and achieved a one star accreditation in 2015.

In 2010, Orbis Technology was renamed to OpenBet, the name of its eponymous software betting platform; it also acquired Alphameric Solutions, a software company supplying betting retail products, which was renamed as the OpenBet Retail division. In January 2011, OpenBet was sold by NDS for £208 million, in a management buyout backed by private equity firm, Vitruvian Partners.

In March 2013 David Loveday stepped down, with COO Jeremy Thompson-Hill taking over as CEO of Openbet. In April 2015, it acquired their Greek branch from outsourcing partner Athens Technology Center S.A., increasing the group's headcount by 25%.

In 2016, when OpenBet was sold by Vitruvian Partners to NYX Gaming Group, the company was named sports betting supplier of the year at the eGamingReview B2B awards for the seventh successive year. The following year, NYX was acquired by Scientific Games Corporation with OpenBet becoming part of the latter's SG Digital division in 2018. In 2019, OpenBet partnered up with the TAB NZ, a New Zealand betting site.

In September 2021, Endeavor Group announced that it would acquire OpenBet for $1.2 billion in cash and stock; this transaction was finalized the following year. In June 2023, OpenBet acquired Neccton, which is a responsible gaming and fraud detection app provider.

In August 2024, Endeavor announced that OpenBet and IMG Arena would be put up for sale as part of its plans to go private. On November 11, it was announced that OpenBet would be sold in a management buyout to a group led by Endeavor CEO Ari Emanuel for $450 million.

On March 24, 2025, the firm reported that OB Global Holdings LLC had completed the purchase of OpenBet.
