= Cisco Videoscape =

British video technology company

- Type: Division
- Predecessor: NDS Group Ltd.
- Founded: 1988; 38 years ago
- Fate: Acquired by Cisco Systems
- Headquarters: Staines, United Kingdom
- Key people: Chuck Robbins (CEO); Abe Peled (executive chairman)
- Products: VideoGuard Conditional Access; Videoguard Connect DRM; MediaHighway - Set Top Box Software; Broadband IPTV; XTV Digital Video Recorders DVRs); OTT; Unified Headend; Gateways; Interactive TV
- Number of employees: 5,500 as of Mar 2012 (4,200 technical)
- Parent: Permira
- Subsidiaries: Jungo; CastUp; SiVenture
- Website: synamedia.com
- Footnotes Other statistics: (12/2011); CA/DRM 125 million pay TV households Middleware 214 million devices Digital Video Recorders 47 million deployed;

Cisco Videoscape (formerly NDS Group and currently known as Synamedia) was a majority owned subsidiary of News Corp, which develops software for the pay TV industry (including cable, satellite and others). NDS Group was established in 1988 as an Israeli start up company. It was acquired by Cisco in 2012 before being sold back to the private equity company Permira in 2018 for US$1 billion, who rebranded the company as Synamedia. The company is currently headquartered in Staines, United Kingdom.

Filling The Executive Chairman and CEO roles at NDS is Abe Peled with former CEO Dave Habiger having left in 2012. The company's major product is the VideoGuard conditional access system, which is used by more than 85 leading pay TV operators around the world. NDS technology includes end to end connections for satellite, broadband IPTV, Hybrid, OTT, and EPGs. It has launched VideoGuard Connect, the DRM for Pay-TV, designed to help TV operators to seamlessly extend their pay-TV services to connected media devices, enabling secure ingestion, delivery and consumption of premium content over both managed and OTT networks while maintaining subscription privileges across devices. NDS also provides advanced advertising, professional services and system integration services. New ways to secure content on PCs, tablets, and other devices are displayed at IBC and CES.

Cisco Systems announced the acquisition of the company in March 2012. It was later acquired successfully and in 2014 its name was changed into Videoscape, becoming a part of Cisco. In 2018 Cisco sold this part of the business, with Permira successfully acquiring it and it being branded as Synamedia.

== History ==
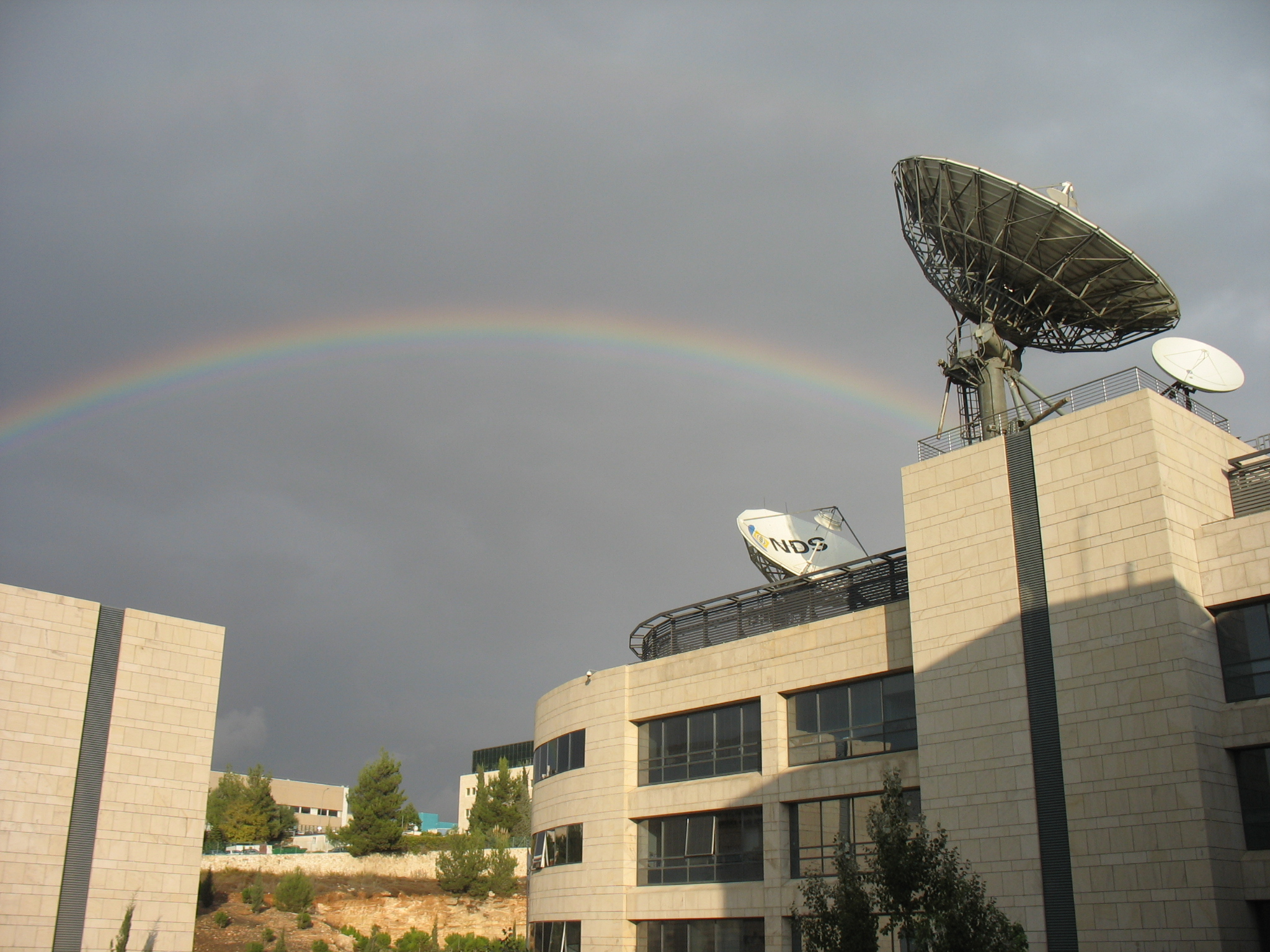
NDS Israel headquarters in Har Hotzvim, Jerusalem

The development of the technology on the basis which the company was founded on, began in 1983, at the Weizmann Institute by Professor Adi Shamir (who had previously developed the RSA encryption algorithm), together with his research students Amos Fiat and Yossi Tulpen. The first application they developed was a digital rights management solution aimed at protecting software from being copied illegally. They then developed a smart card to prevent counterfeits, which were first intended to protect credit card transactions. The patent of the card is registered in the name of Yeda Research & Development Co., the commercial arm of the Weizmann Institute of Science. In those years, media mogul Rupert Murdoch began to develop his television business, which included satellite TV broadcasts for a fee, and a pay-per-view service for movies and sporting events. In order to charge a fee based on viewing, and to maintain his agreements with the film companies and the owners of the sports broadcasting rights, he looked for a way to encrypt the broadcasts. An Australian entrepreneur named Bruce Hundertmark contacted Shamir and the Weizmann Institute and between them and Murdoch's News Corp. corporation. News Corp. was impressed with their "smart card" technology and decided to invest in its development.

The company was established in 1988 as News Datacom (NDC) by Dr. Dov Rubin, Jonathan (Yoni) Hashkes, Michael Dick, and Yishai Sered - and soon joined by Mickey Cohen and Gershon Baron - in partnership with News Corporation and the Weizmann Institute, a university and research institute in Rehovot, Israel. The company was renamed News Datacom Research, and additional investors joined. The company signed a contract with BSkyB, in which News Corp. had a 35% stake, for the development of an encryption system.

In 1992, one year after finalizing its product, the company was acquired by its primary customer, News Corp, for $15 million, and renamed News Digital Systems (NDS). In 1996 NDS merged with Digi-Media Vision (DMV) a video compression company that News had acquired in 1995 which had been the Advanced Products Division [APD] of National Transcommunications Limited [NTL] in the UK. In 1999 the video compression division of NDS was sold to Tandberg Television (now MediaKind) and, separately, the company began trading as a public company on the NASDAQ stock exchange. In 2009, Permira and News Corporation announced a $3.6 billion arrangement for buying the public holding in NDS, turning it into a privately held company.

=== Acquisitions ===
- In December 2000, NDS acquired Orbis Technology, a British company which develops software for interactive betting, in order to strengthen its application portfolio for Interactive TV.
  - In March 2008 Orbis Technology acquired Electracade Ltd, a UK-based developer of online interactive games for £2.6 million.
  - In July 2010, Orbis Technology acquired Alphameric Solutions, a provider of technology to the bookmaking marketplace, from Alphameric PLC for £15.5 million.
  - In February 2011, Orbis Technology was sold by NDS for £208 million, in a management buyout backed by private equity firm Vitruvian Partners.
- In June 2002, NDS acquired Visionik A/S, a Danish company which provides digital interactive broadcast technology.
- In August 2003, NDS acquired all the intellectual property assets of a French interactive TV technology company Interactif Delta Production S.A.
- On 16 December 2003, NDS acquired the MediaHighway middleware business from Canal+ Technologies a subsidiary of Thomson SA and licensed certain related patents from Thomson SA for a total consideration of €60 million.
- In October 2006, NDS acquired Danish game design company ITE.
- On December 4, 2006, NDS acquired Jungo, which provides software for residential gateways, for an aggregate consideration of up to $107.5 million in cash.
- On August 7, 2007 NDS acquired CastUp Inc, which provides an end-to-end solution for the acquisition, processing, distributing, serving and monetizing of rich media content over IP, particularly video and audio over the Internet.
- On March 15, 2012, Cisco Systems announced its intent to acquire NDS Group. It was later acquired successfully and in 2014 its name was changed into Videoscape, becoming a part of Cisco.
- On April 29, 2018, Calcalist reported that Cisco sold its departments related to video and security formerly part of NDS to Permira.

== Legal issues ==
=== Israeli tax investigation ===
In 1996, NDS was investigated by Israeli authorities for allegations of tax irregularities. None was proven but NDS later paid a $3m settlement to close the case.

=== Canal Plus lawsuit ===
In 2002, Groupe Canal+ accused NDS of extracting the UserROM code from the MediaGuard cards and leaking it onto the internet. According to The Guardian, the NDS laboratory in Haifa, Israel had been working on breaking the SECA-produced MediaGuard smartcards used by Canal+, ITV Digital and other non-Murdoch-owned TV companies throughout Europe. Canal+ brought a $3 billion lawsuit against NDS but later dropped the action. News Corporation agreed to buy Canal Plus's struggling Italian operation Telepiù.

=== Echostar lawsuit ===
Echostar sued NDS for $1 billion for piracy and copyright infringement of the Echostar viewing card codes and for aiding the distribution and supply of pirate Echostar viewing cards for the Echostar-owned Dish Network. EchoStar alleged that in the 90's NDS was responsible for the compromise of EchoStar's satellite television programming platform through the posting of code on the DR7 website. NDS vigorously defended the allegations made against it, establishing that NDS played no part in the compromise of EchoStar's security system. In 2008, a jury in California convicted NDS of violating the Federal Communications Act and California Penal Code, cleared NDS of other charges, and awarded $1,500 in damages.

In August 2010, the Ninth Circuit stated in its decision that “EchoStar did not succeed 'on any significant issue' or 'achieve any of the benefit it sought in bringing suit' under the Communications Act.” The Ninth Circuit awarded NDS US$18 million and concluded that “There is no question that NDS successfully defended against all of EchoStar’s claims based on or related to its theory that NDS was responsible for the compromise of EchoStar’s satellite television programming security system.”

In February 2011, the Ninth Circuit further stated, “NDS was the prevailing party in this litigation and that EchoStar fails to meet the legal definition of a prevailing party on any of its claims.”

In January 2012, the Supreme Court of the United States of America denied a petition to hear a challenge by EchoStar. EchoStar and NDS agreed that the terms for satisfying the judgment should be met by 9 March 2012.

On 9 March 2012, NDS received from EchoStar the remaining balance of US$18,935,399.49, in full satisfaction of the final judgment, including district court fees and costs, appellate court fees and costs and all interest.

=== BBC Panorama ===
On 26 March 2012, the BBC programme Panorama broadcast that NDS employed computer hacking to undermine the business of ONDigital. At the time, ONDigital was the primary TV rival in Britain of BSkyB, a News Corporation company. The accusations arise from emails obtained by the BBC, and an interview with Lee Gibling, the operator of a hacking website, who claims he was paid up to £60,000 per year by Ray Adams, NDS head of security. UK broadcasting watchdog Ofcom is to investigate these claims. These claims are vigorously denied by NDS and NewsCorp.

=== Australian Financial Review Allegations ===
On 27 March 2012, the Australian Financial Review published further allegations about NDS' involvement in hacking the systems of competitors. The Australian Financial Review also published online a sample of 14,400 emails allegedly taken from the computer of former NDS head of security Ray Adams. The investigation by the paper alleges that NDS illegally undermined rivals Austar, Optus and Foxtel at a time when parent company News Corporation was moving to take control of the Australian pay TV industry. In response to these allegations, Australia's communication minister Steven Conroy called for a police investigation. In response to the allegations, News Limited, the Australian arm of News Corporation released the following statement: "The story is full of factual inaccuracies, flawed references, fanciful conclusions and baseless accusations which have been disproved in overseas courts,"

== Products and customers ==
As of December 2011, NDS VideoGuard CA and DRM were deployed in more than 125 million digital pay-TV households. MediaHighway set-top-box software has been deployed in more than 214 million set-top boxes. XTV PVR/DVR technology is used by more than 20 operators in more than 47 million set-top-boxes. It is more commonly identifiable under the names Sky+ (in BSkyB) and DirecTV+ (in DirecTV). NDS also supplies interactive TV applications, platforms, and development tools. NDS has over 5000 employees, with offices in the UK, Israel, India, United States, Spain, Germany, Brazil, Russia, Singapore, France, South Korea, China, Hong Kong and Australia.

Leading customers include DirecTV (in the USA), Sky UK, Sky Italia, Sky Deutschland, SKY México, SKY Brasil, SKY Network Television (in New Zealand), beIN (in MENA), Viasat (in Sweden, Norway & Denmark), TotalTV, Foxtel (in Australia), China Central Television (CCTV), Yes and Hot (in Israel), SkyLife, CanalSat (in France), Astro (in Malaysia), Cablevision (in the USA), Indovision (in Indonesia), Tata Sky, Airtel, Hathway, ACT and Den (in India), Telecom Italia (in Italy), TrueVisions (in Thailand) and Oi TV (in Brazil).

== See also ==
- Videoguard
- Conditional access
- Interactive television
- Economy of Israel
- Science and technology in Israel
- Silicon Wadi
