= Synamedia =

British video technology company

Synamedia Ltd.
- Headquarters: Maidenhead, United Kingdom
- Key people: Tzvi Gerstl (CEO); Claire Lea (CFO); Eli Sharon (CTO); Shauna O'Handley (CPO); Steeve Reeves (Chief Revenue Officer); Shlomi Rosenberg (Chief Customer Success Officer); Ismat Levin (EVP, General Counsel)
- Products: VideoGuard Conditional Access; Videoguard Connect DRM; MediaHighway - Set Top Box Software; Broadband IPTV; XTV Digital Video Recorders DVRs); OTT; Unified Headend; Gateways; Interactive TV
- Number of employees: 1,000 (2026)
- Website: synamedia.com

Synamedia Ltd. (previously Cisco's SPVSS business, and formerly NDS Group Ltd., and later Cisco Videoscape) is a video technology provider headquartered in Maidenhead, UK. Its products cover content distribution and delivery, video processing, advanced advertising, broadband offerings, and video security.

== History ==
The company was formed in 1988 as News Datacom in Israel, offering encryption technology for satellite broadcasts. The encryption technology was developed by Israeli cryptographer Adi Shamir and Amos Fiat. In 1992, the company was acquired by News Corporation and renamed News Digital Systems (NDS). In 2012, Cisco Systems Inc. acquired NDS. It became the foundation of Cisco's Service Provider Video Software Solutions (SPVSS) business. In May 2018, Permira acquired the SPVSS business from Cisco. The acquisition included Cisco's Infinite Video platform, the former Scientific Atlanta video processing portfolio, cloud digital video recording, video processing, video security, and video middleware. In October 2018, the business was launched as Synamedia.

Synamedia leadership includes Tzvi Gerstl, CEO; Ismat Levin, EVP General Counsel; Shauna O’Handley, EVP of People and Places; Claire Lea, CFO; Steeve Reeves, Chief Revenue Officer; Eli Sharon, CTO; and Shlomi Rosenberg, Chief Customer Success Officer. The company has offices in the U.K., U.S., Israel, India, and China.

Synamedia's clients include satellite and cable pay TV providers, media companies, and others involved in direct-to-consumer OTT distribution. It has over 200 pay TV and media customers. They include Astro, AT&T, beIN, Bharti Airtel, Charter, Comcast, Cox, Disney, Etisalat, Foxtel, Liberty Global, MNC Vision, OSN, Rogers, Sky, Tata Sky, Verizon, Vodafone, and YES.

In January 2020, Synamedia entered a partnership with Pearl TV to join the Phoenix Model Market Initiative.

In August 2021, Synamedia acquired ContentArmor, a company that develops forensic watermarking software for the media and entertainment industry.

In May 2022, it was announced that Synamedia had acquired the UK-headquartered TV and OTT content discovery SaaS platform, Utelly. In July 2022, Synamedia acquired Quortex, a Saas streaming video processing provider.

In July 2026, Synamedia completed the sale of its Video Network business to the Lumine Group. The business began operating as a standalone company under the name Quortex.

== Products ==
Synamedia's cloud-based platforms for cable, satellite, and IPTV and streaming services include Synamedia Go, Go.Aggregate, Go.Enrich and the Infinite platform. In September 2021, Synamedia announced pre-integrated security and business products with support for Android TV on its Infinite platform.

In 2019, Synamedia released its Credentials Sharing and Fraud Insight product. The product enables pay TV partners and OTT companies to track and prevent piracy and password-sharing.

In April 2021, Synamedia announced Gravity, a managed service that offers broadband and video capabilities to operators and service providers for their small to medium business (SMB) and residential customers.

At the end of 2020, Synamedia worked alongside THEO Technologies to advance the already existent High Efficiency Streaming Protocol (HESP) . They did so by founding the HESP Alliance. This alliance intended to enhance the modern streaming landscape, by bringing video vendors and media companies together, in order to provide a scalable solution for ultra-low latency.

The Synamedia Video Network portfolio includes a virtual Digital Content Manager (DCM) which transitions distribution architectures to an IP-based virtualized video processing environment. In May 2020, Synamedia launched a ATSC 3.0 Receiver which can function as both an RF and IP receiver. The receiver is in use today with Fox Television Stations in Orlando, FL. Synamedia acquired Quortex in 2022 adding Quortex Play for just-in-time streaming at scale to the Video Network portfolio. In April 2023, Synamedia released Quortex Link for video distribution. Both are pay-as-you-use, self-service, multi-tenant SaaS platforms.

In October 2019, Discovery began using the virtual DCM platform. The Synamedia virtual DCM with Smart Rate Control and Automation provides bandwidth distribution, storage capabilities and High Definition viewing experiences for live and time-shifted ABR streaming. The Synamedia Video Network Service Manager is a micro-services-based platform that helps operators and video producers quickly update their programming line-ups and bundled offers. The Converged Headend is designed to help pay-TV providers transition to software-based services, and can be deployed on premise, in the cloud, or in a hybrid environment.

In April 2021, Synamedia released Clarissa, which analyzes critical behavioral and consumption insights for pay-TV and OTT services. Synamedia Iris, an addressable advertising for broadcast, IP, OTT and hybrid, was announced in August 2020. In May 2022, Vodafone Deutschland went live with Clarissa and Synamedia Iris to support its GigaTV service.

Synamedia, in partnership with Sky, has developed a personalized ad targeting platform, AdSmart, which serves TV advertisements to households based on their profiles.
