= J. D. Power III =

American businessman (1931–2021)

- Born: James David Power III; May 30, 1931; Worcester, Massachusetts, U.S.
- Died: January 23, 2021 (aged 89); Westlake Village, California, U.S.
- Education: College of the Holy Cross (BA); University of Pennsylvania (MBA)
- Occupation: Business executive

James David Power III (May 30, 1931 – January 23, 2021) was an American businessman and the founder of the marketing firm J.D. Power (formerly J.D. Power and Associates).

== Early life and education ==
James David Power III was born on May 30, 1931, in Worcester, Massachusetts. He was the oldest of four children. His father was an English teacher at Worcester Boys Trade High School, teaching at the school for 44 years.

After attending Saint Peter's High School, Power graduated from the College of the Holy Cross with a Bachelor of Arts in 1953. He then served four years as a line officer aboard the Coast Guard icebreaker USCGC Eastwind in the Arctic and Antarctic. He appeared briefly in a Disney documentary “Men Against The Arctic” about icebreakers.

Power subsequently earned an MBA from the Wharton School of the University of Pennsylvania in Finance. He joined Ford Motor Company as a financial analyst and later worked for Marplan as a marketing research consultant for General Motors Corporation's Buick and GMC truck and coach divisions. In 1965, Power and his family moved to California with the purpose of establishing a family business. Prior to launching J.D. Power and Associates in 1968, Power worked as a marketing research executive for J. I. Case Company, a construction and farm equipment manufacturer, and was director of corporate planning for McCulloch Corporation, a Los Angeles-based engine manufacturer.

== J.D. Power and Associates ==
Power began conducting customer satisfaction research on April 1, 1968, as founder of the marketing information firm J.D. Power and Associates. Power started J.D. Power and Associates at the kitchen table with his family and initially the "Associates" in the firm's title were his own wife and children. The Power family also took out a second mortgage on their existing house at the time to support the fledgling company.

In 1972, the company first drew national attention when Julie P. Power, David Power's wife, discovered a design flaw in certain Mazda automobiles, which was then publicized by The Wall Street Journal. In the following years, J. D. Power and Associates became well known for its automotive customer satisfaction rankings. Power sold the company to McGraw-Hill in 2005 for an undisclosed amount of money. He also stepped down as chairman but remained active with strategic planning.

== Awards and philanthropy ==
In 1992, Power was a recipient of the Automotive Hall of Fame's Distinguished Service Citation, awarded each year to seven of the industry's most accomplished leaders. In 2014, Power was inducted into the Automotive Hall of Fame. He held honorary doctorate degrees from College of the Holy Cross, California Lutheran University, California State University, Northridge, and Misericordia College.

In January 2018, the Power family gave the College of the Holy Cross $3 million in support of the college's Center for Liberal Arts in the World, to be renamed the "J.D. Power Center for Liberal Arts in the World". He also was an adjunct professor of marketing at California State University, Northridge. Power also frequently spoke to top management and boards of directors of companies worldwide.

== Personal life ==
Power is the subject of Sarah Morgans and Bill Thorness' book, Power: How J. D. Power III Became the Auto Industry's Adviser, Confessor, and Eyewitness to History.

His family currently resides in Westlake Village, California.
