= Malik Sealy =

American basketball player (1970–2000)

- Sealy while playing for St. John's

Personal information
- Born: February 1, 1970 Bronx, New York, U.S.
- Died: May 20, 2000 (aged 30) St. Louis Park, Minnesota, U.S.
- Listed height: 6 ft 8 in (2.03 m)
- Listed weight: 200 lb (91 kg)

Career information
- High school: Tolentine (Bronx, New York)
- College: St. John's (1988–1992)
- NBA draft: 1992: 1st round, 14th overall pick
- Drafted by: Indiana Pacers
- Playing career: 1992–2000
- Position: Small forward / shooting guard
- Number: 21, 14, 2

Career history
- 1992–1994: Indiana Pacers
- 1994–1997: Los Angeles Clippers
- 1997–1998: Detroit Pistons
- 1998–2000: Minnesota Timberwolves

Career highlights
- No. 2 retired by Minnesota Timberwolves; Consensus second-team All-American (1992); 2× First-team All-Big East (1991, 1992); 2× Haggerty Award winner (1991, 1992); McDonald's All-American (1988); First-team Parade All-American (1988); Mr. New York Basketball (1988)

Career NBA statistics
- Points: 4,955 (10.1 ppg)
- Rebounds: 1,585 (3.2 rpg)
- Steals: 518 (1.1 spg)
- Stats at NBA.com
- Stats at Basketball Reference

Malik Sealy (February 1, 1970 – May 20, 2000) was an American professional basketball player, active from 1992 until his death in an automobile accident at the age of 30. Posthumously inducted into the NYC Basketball Hall of Fame in 2004, Sealy played eight seasons in the National Basketball Association (NBA) for the Indiana Pacers, Los Angeles Clippers, Detroit Pistons and Minnesota Timberwolves.

== Early life ==
A native of Claremont, Bronx, New York City, Sealy was named after noted African-American social activist Malik Shabazz, better known as Malcolm X, for whom Sealy's father had been a bodyguard. In his senior year at Tolentine High School, Sealy, along with future collegians Brian Reese and Adrian Autry, went 30–1 and won the state title.

== College career ==
Sealy played college basketball at St. John's University, finishing his college career with 2,401 points, good for second all-time in St. John's history.

== Professional career ==
=== NBA (1992–2000) ===
Sealy was drafted by the Indiana Pacers with the 14th overall pick in the 1992 NBA draft.

Over the course of his NBA career, Sealy averaged 10.1 points per game in 23.8 minutes. As a rookie, he lost his playbook, which was turned over to WFAN radio personality Don Imus, whom Sealy contacted on the air in an attempt to have it returned. His final season's highlights included making a game-winning reverse putback shot at the buzzer against the Orlando Magic on December 27, 1999, which gave the Timberwolves a 107–105 road win. He also made a game-winning 3-pointer off the glass as time expired in a 101–100 Timberwolves win over the Indiana Pacers on January 17, 2000.

Sealy was posthumously inducted into the NYC Basketball Hall of Fame in 2004.

== Acting career ==
Sealy was also an aspiring actor, and had a major role as the talented but selfish basketball player 'Stacey Patton' in the 1996 motion picture Eddie starring Whoopi Goldberg. He also made appearances on TV shows such as The Sentinel and Diagnosis: Murder. In addition to this, Sealy designed ties and clothing and owned "Malik Sealy XXI, Inc."

== Death ==
Sealy was killed in St. Louis Park, Minnesota on May 20, 2000. He was driving home from a birthday celebration for teammate and best friend Kevin Garnett in downtown Minneapolis when his SUV was struck by a pickup truck traveling the wrong way down the highway. The truck was driven by 43-year-old Souksangouane Phengsene, who survived the accident with head and chest injuries. Neither driver was wearing a seatbelt. Phengsene's airbag deployed, but Sealy's SUV did not have one.

Blood tests indicated that at the time of the accident, Phengsene had been driving drunk; his blood alcohol content was 0.19%. The legal limit in Minnesota at the time was 0.1%. He pleaded guilty to a charge of vehicular manslaughter, was given a four-year prison term, and was released from prison in 2003. In April 2008, Phengsene was given an eight-year sentence for a subsequent drunk driving conviction.

Sealy is buried at Ferncliff Cemetery in Hartsdale, New York.

== Legacy ==
In Sealy's honor, the Minnesota Timberwolves retired his #2 jersey. Kevin Garnett also paid a tribute to him, having written "2MALIK" in the inside of the tongue on the Adidas Garnett 3 shoes. Garnett has a tattoo honoring Sealy's name on his right arm. Upon being traded from the Boston Celtics to the Brooklyn Nets in July 2013, Garnett changed his uniform number to #2 in honor of Sealy. In his homecoming to Minnesota on February 25, 2015, Kevin Garnett wore a #2 sweatband on his left forearm in memory of his best friend.

== Career statistics ==
Legend
GP	Games played	GS	Games started	MPG	Minutes per game
FG%	Field goal percentage	3P%	3-point field goal percentage	FT%	Free throw percentage
RPG	Rebounds per game	APG	Assists per game	SPG	Steals per game
BPG	Blocks per game	PPG	Points per game	**Bold**	Career high

=== Regular season ===
Year	Team	GP	GS	MPG	FG%	3P%	FT%	RPG	APG	SPG	BPG	PPG
1992–93	Indiana	58	2	11.6	.426	.226	.689	1.9	.8	.6	.1	5.7
1993–94	Indiana	43	5	14.5	.405	.250	.678	2.7	1.1	.7	.2	6.6
1994–95	L.A. Clippers	60	41	26.7	.435	.301	.780	3.6	1.8	1.2	.4	13.0
1995–96	L.A. Clippers	62	48	25.8	.415	.210	.799	3.9	1.9	1.4	.5	11.5
1996–97	L.A. Clippers	80	**79**	**30.7**	.396	**.356**	.876	3.0	2.1	**1.6**	**.6**	**13.5**
1997–98	Detroit	77	10	21.3	.428	.220	.824	2.8	1.3	.8	.3	7.7
1998–99	Minnesota	31	7	23.6	.411	.261	**.902**	3.0	1.2	1.0	.2	8.1
1999–00	Minnesota	**82**	61	29.2	**.476**	.286	.812	**4.3**	**2.4**	.9	.2	11.3
Career		493	253	23.8	.426	.292	.809	3.2	1.7	1.1	.3	10.1

=== Playoffs ===
Year	Team	GP	GS	MPG	FG%	3P%	FT%	RPG	APG	SPG	BPG	PPG
1993	Indiana	3	0	6.0	.000	.000	**1.000**	.7	.0	.0	.0	.7
1997	L.A. Clippers	3	3	26.3	**.480**	.200	.733	1.0	**1.7**	.0	.0	12.0
1999	Minnesota	**4**	0	17.5	.348	—	.800	1.5	.8	.3	**.3**	5.0
2000	Minnesota	**4**	**4**	**30.5**	.463	**.333**	.688	**4.5**	1.3	**.5**	.0	**12.5**
Career		14	7	20.6	.415	.222	.737	2.1	.9	.2	.1	7.7

== See also ==
- List of basketball players who died during their careers
