= Hyundai Motor America =

Subsidiary of Hyundai Motor Company

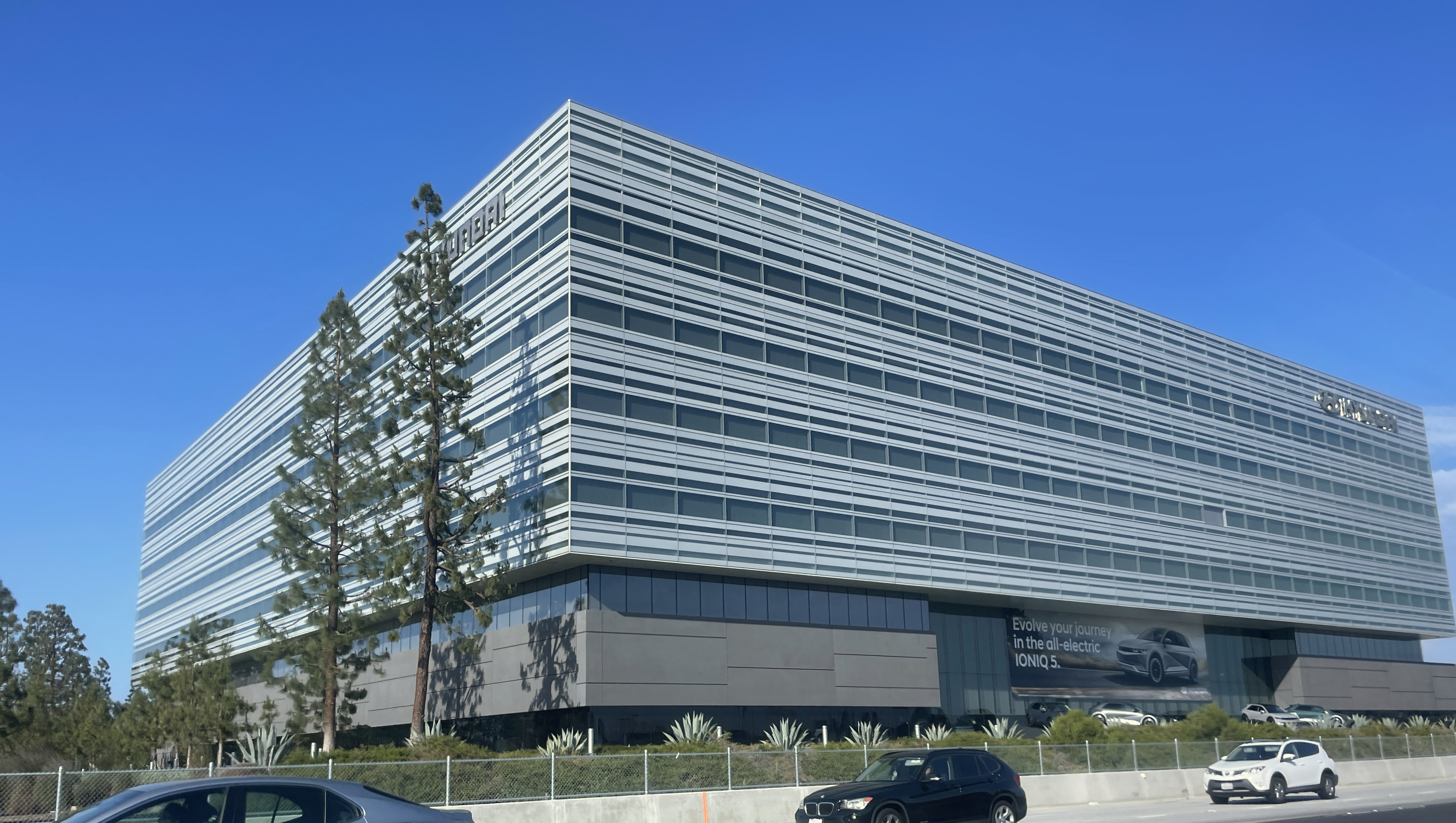
- Company type: Subsidiary
- Industry: Automotive
- Founded: February 20, 1986; 40 years ago
- Headquarters: Fountain Valley, California, United States
- Area served: United States
- Key people: Randy Parker (CEO)
- Products: Automobiles, commercial vehicles, engines
- Parent: Hyundai Motor Company
- Website: hyundaiusa.com

Hyundai Motor America, doing business as Hyundai Motor North America is the operating subsidiary that oversees all operations of Hyundai Motor Company in Canada, Mexico, and the United States. Along with Hyundai's USA manufacturing plant in Montgomery, Alabama called Hyundai Motor Manufacturing Alabama, Hyundai has total of 19 manufacturing plants globally. It has a plant in Ellabell, Georgia, which it is currently expanding. Its operations include research and development, manufacturing, sales, marketing, after sales and corporate functions, which are controlled by HMA but sometimes executed by other subsidiaries and holding companies. The company is headquartered in Fountain Valley, California.

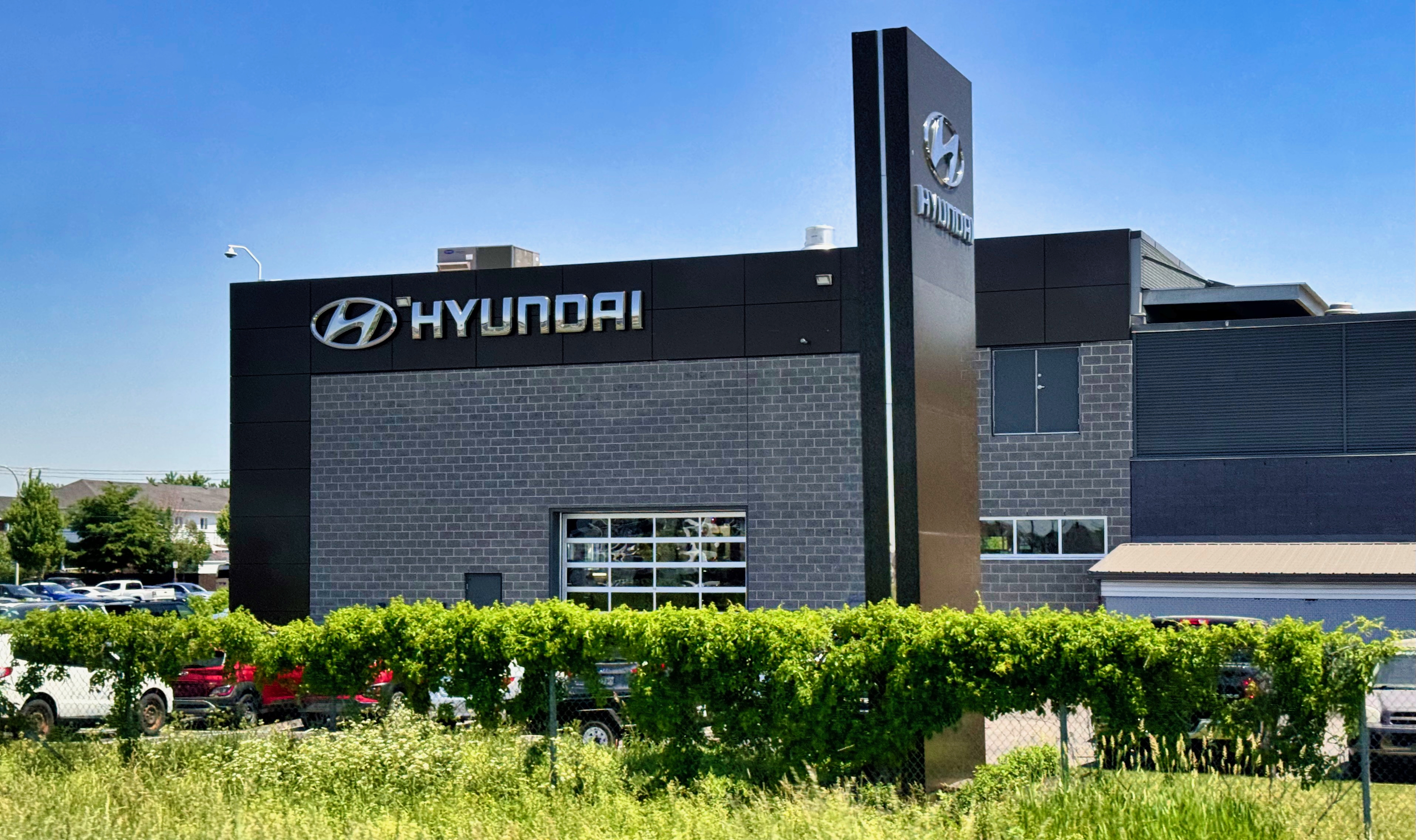
A Hyundai dealership in St-Jean-sur-Richelieu, Quebec, Canada

== History ==
Hyundai Motor America began selling cars in the United States on 20 February 1986, with a single model, the Hyundai Excel, which was offered in a variety of trims and body styles. That year, Hyundai set a record of selling the most automobiles in its first year of business in the United States compared to any other car brand; total sales in 1986 were 168,882.

Initially well received, the Excel's faults soon became apparent; cost-cutting measures caused reliability to suffer. With an increasingly poor reputation for quality, Hyundai sales plummeted, and many dealerships either earned their profits on repairs or abandoned the product. At one point, Hyundai became the butt of many jokes (i.e. Hyundai stands for "Hope you understand nothing's driveable and inexpensive") and even made David Letterman's Top Ten Hilarious Mischief Night Pranks to Play in Space: No.8 – Paste a "Hyundai" logo on the main control panel.

In response, Hyundai began investing heavily in the quality, design, manufacturing, and long-term research of its vehicles. It added free maintenance for the first 2 years or 24,000 miles for all its new cars sold, starting with the 1992 model year. It also added a 10-year or 100,000-mile (160,000 km) powertrain warranty (known as the Hyundai Advantage) to its vehicles sold in the United States. By 2004, sales had dramatically increased, and the reputation of Hyundai cars improved. In 2004, Hyundai tied with Honda for initial brand quality in a survey/study from J.D. Power and Associates, for having 102 problems per 1000 vehicles. This made Hyundai second in the industry, only behind Toyota, for initial vehicle quality. The company continued this tradition by placing third overall in J.D. Power's 2006 Initial Quality Survey, behind only Porsche and Lexus. Hyundai is ranked number 4 in World's Most Admired Companies under the motor vehicles section of CNN, after BMW (Bayerische Motoren Werke), Volkswagen and Daimler in 2011.

Hyundai continues to invest heavily in its American operations as its cars grow in popularity. In 1990, Hyundai established the Hyundai Design Center in Fountain Valley, California. The center moved to a new $30 million facility in Irvine, California, in 2003, and was renamed the Hyundai Kia Motors Design and Technical Center. Besides the design studio, the facility also housed Hyundai America Technical Center, Inc. (HATCI, established in 1986), a subsidiary responsible for all engineering activities in the U.S. for Hyundai. Hyundai America Technical Center moved to its new 200,000-square-foot (19,000 m^{2}), $117 million headquarters in Superior Township, Michigan (near Ann Arbor) in 2005. Later that same year, HATCI announced that it would be expanding its technical operations in Michigan and hiring 600 additional engineers and other technical employees over a period of five years. The center also has employees in California and Alabama.

Hyundai incorporated a new manufacturing facility, Hyundai Motor Manufacturing Alabama, in April 2002. The new plant in Montgomery, Alabama, was completed during 2004, at a cost of $1.7 billion. Production started in May 2005. It employed more than 3,000 workers in 2012. Currently, the plant assembles the Hyundai Elantra, the Hyundai Sonata, and the Hyundai Theta engine. It is Hyundai's second attempt at producing cars in North America since Hyundai Auto Canada Inc.'s plant in Quebec closed in 1993.

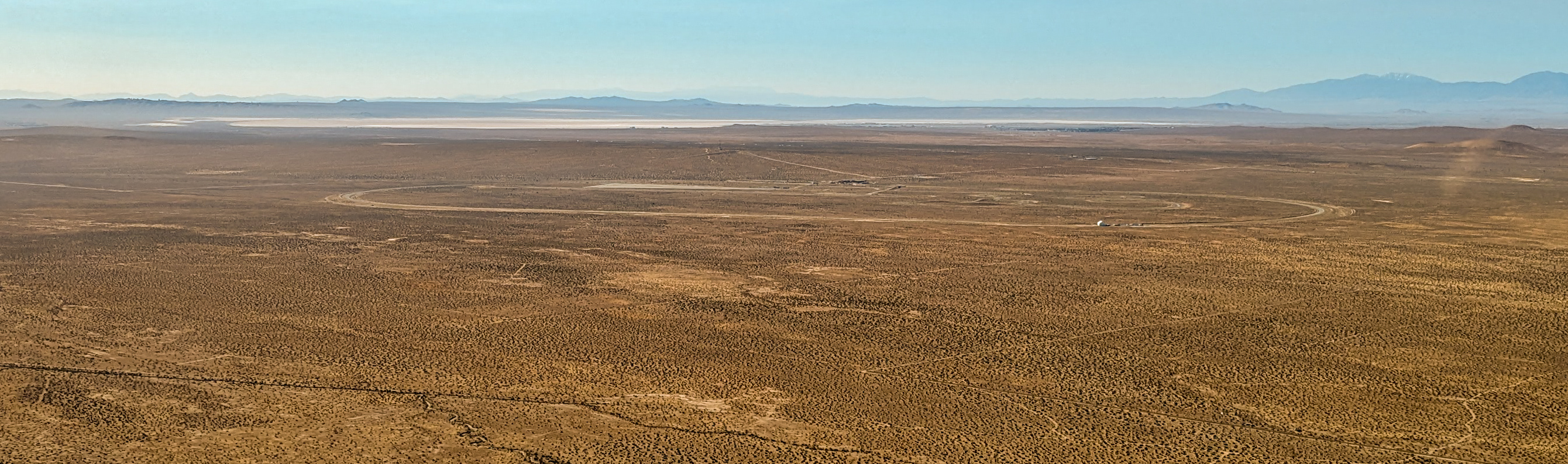
Hyundai Kia proving ground, Mohave

Hyundai America Technical Center completed construction of its Hyundai/Kia proving ground in California City, California, in 2004. The 4,300-acre (17 km^{2}) facility is located in the Mojave Desert and features a 6.4-mile (10.3 km) oval track, a Vehicle Dynamics Area, a vehicle-handling course inside the oval track, a paved hill road, and several special surface roads. A 30,000-square-foot (2,800 m^{2}) complex featuring offices and indoor testing areas is located on the premises as well. The facility was built at a cost of $50 million. An aerial view can be found here.

In 2003, Consumer Reports, based on complaints about 2002 model new cars that in general are less than one year usage, ranked Hyundai's reliability tied with Honda's; however, J.D. Power and Associates put Hyundai's 2002 vehicles below the industry average according to its annual Initial Quality Survey, which looks at problems in the first 90 days of ownership.

In 2006, J.D. Power and Associates' quality ranking, overall the Hyundai brand ranked 3rd, just behind Porsche and Lexus, and beating longtime rival Toyota. But Hyundai's ranking fell to twelfth in 2007. However, in 2009, Hyundai was the Highest Ranked Non-Premium Nameplate in the J.D. Power and Associates Initial Quality Study.

In the 2007 Strategic Vision Total Quality Awards, Hyundai Motor leads the most vehicle segments in Strategic Vision's Total Quality Index, measuring the ownership experience. They attempt to measure more than just the number of problems per vehicle. Hyundai tops in Strategic Vision Total Quality Awards. For the first time ever, Hyundai has risen to share the position of having the most models leading a segment. three models with the top Total Quality Index (TQI) score in their segments, including the Hyundai Azera, Entourage, Santa Fe.

In 2007 at the New York International Auto Show, Hyundai unveiled its V8 rear-drive luxury sedan called the Concept Genesis to be slotted above the Azera in the Hyundai line-up. This concept made its American debut in mid-2008. The Genesis reintroduced rear-wheel drive to the Hyundai range following a long period of only producing front-wheel drive cars.

In 2007 at the Los Angeles International Auto Show, Hyundai unveiled its second rear-drive concept car, the Concept Genesis Coupe, will be Hyundai's first sports car due to make its debut in early 2009.

In 2008, Hyundai Santa Fe and Hyundai Elantra were awarded 2008 Consumer Reports "top picks". The magazine's annual ratings, based on road tests and predicted safety and reliability are considered highly influential among consumers. The Hyundai Elantra was Consumer Reports' top-ranked 2008 vehicle among 19 other compacts and small family cars, beating out the Honda Civic, Toyota Corolla and Toyota Prius.

In 2008, at the North American International Auto Show, the production version of the luxury and performance-oriented Hyundai Genesis sedan made its debut, dealerships will have the Genesis as soon as summer 2008. In 2008, at the New York International Auto Show, Hyundai debuted its production version of the performance-oriented rear-drive Hyundai Genesis Coupe, slated to hit dealerships in early 2009.

On 6 January, Hyundai reported sales of December 2008 fell to 24,037, from 46,487 in previous year and sales for the year dropped 14%, a day after the company launched "Hyundai Assurance" in order to spark sales amid tough economic conditions.

In 2009, Hyundai announced the five-door hatchback variant of the Elantra compact sedan will carry the name Elantra Touring when it goes on sale in the spring as a 2009 model.

In 2009, the Hyundai Genesis luxury sedan was named 2009 North American Car of the Year, the first for Hyundai. The Genesis has received a number of well-recognized automobile awards worldwide. It also won the 2009 Canadian Car of the Year after winning its category of Best New Luxury Car under $50,000. The Hyundai's V8 Tau engine in the Genesis, which develops 375 hp (280 kW) on premium fuel and 368 hp (274 kW) on regular fuel, received 2009 Ward's 10 Best Engines award.

In 2009, four models from Hyundai and two from Kia, earned the Top Safety Award by the Insurance Institute for Highway Safety (IIHS).

In 2009, Hyundai/Kia vehicles were named as "least expensive vehicles to insure". Hyundai/Kia vehicles were the least expensive to insure and occupied the "top five" least expensive slots, said Insure.com.

In 2009, according to a preliminary report from the Environmental Protection Agency published in November 2009, which is based on 2009 pre-model year production projections provided by automakers, Hyundai, at an average of 23.4 mpg_{‑US} (10.1 L/100 km; 28.1 mpg_{‑imp}), is the second most fuel-efficient automaker in America, after Honda's combined U.S. fleet of Honda and Acura models at an average of 23.6 mpg_{‑US} (10.0 L/100 km; 28.3 mpg_{‑imp}).

In 2010, a Consumer Reports reliability survey ranked Hyundai (including Kia) as the fourth-best automaker. The ratings reflect the performance, comfort, utility and reliability of more than 280 vehicles that the magazine recently tested.

In 2010, the Hyundai Equus made its North American debut at the North American International Auto Show.

In January 2012, the Hyundai Elantra was named the North American Car of the Year at the North American International Auto Show, selling more than 200,000 cars since the model's redesigned debut.

In a move consistent with its plans to create a performance pedigree, the upwardly mobile Hyundai announced in August 2015 that it would launch a new high-performance brand called "N." The N brand is so named because Hyundai's research and development center is based in Namyang, South Korea. Though the company celebrated N's launch at the 2015 Frankfurt auto show, it did not disclose details at that time about any future performance vehicles that would wear an N badge.

In November 2024, it was reported that the company's Chief Executive Officer, Jose Munoz will hold the new role of global co-CEO of Hyundai Motor Company beginning 1 January 2025. Munoz will be the first foreigner to hold such a high executive post in a giant South Korean conglomerate. The promotion is said to be credited to Munoz's resilience and strategies in pushing for record sales in the North America region.

== Sales ==
Hyundai Motors America sales in the US, 1997–present
Year	Sales	±%
1997	113,186	—
1998	90,217	−20.3%
1999	164,190	+82.0%
2000	244,391	+48.8%
2001	346,235	+41.7%
2002	375,119	+8.3%
2003	400,221	+6.7%
2004	418,615	+4.6%
2005	455,012	+8.7%
2006	455,520	+0.1%
2007	467,009	+2.5%
2008	401,742	−14.0%
2009	435,064	+8.3%
2010	538,228	+23.7%
2011	645,691	+20.0%
2012	703,007	+8.9%
2013	720,783	+2.5%
2014	725,718	+0.7%
2015	761,710	+5.0%
2016	775,005	+1.7%
2017	685,555	−11.5%
2018	677,946	−1.1%
2019	710,004 (Note: includes Genesis division)	—
Source: "Hyundai Newsroom".
