= St. Nicholas of Tolentine Church (Bronx) =

Coordinates: 40°51′44.89″N 73°54′21.43″W

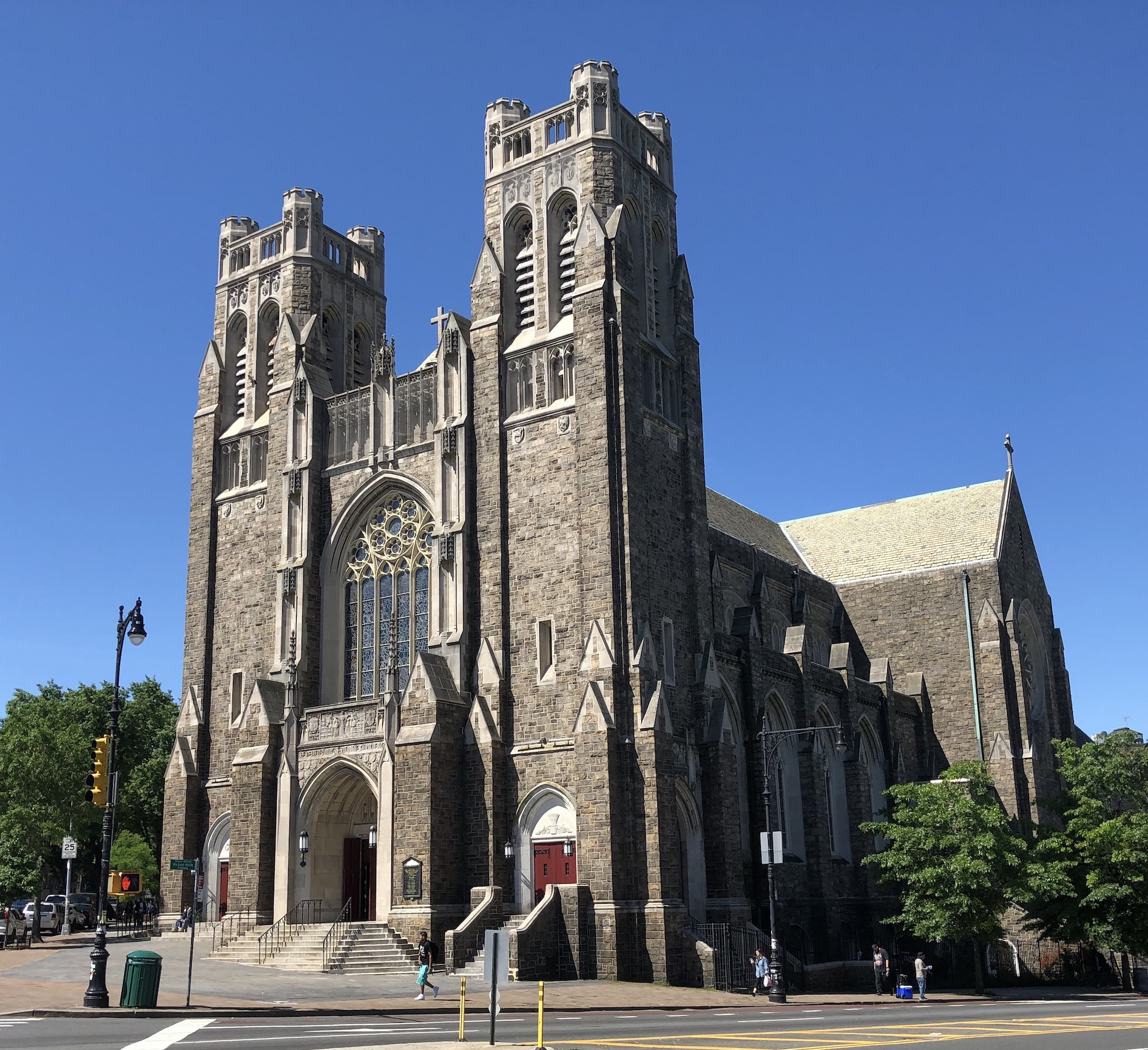
- St. Nicholas of Tolentine Church
- Location: Fordham Road and University Avenue, Bronx, New York City
- Country: United States
- Denomination: Catholic Church
- Religious institute: Order of Saint Augustine

History
- Dedication: Nicholas of Tolentine
- Dedicated: September 15, 1907

Architecture
- Functional status: Active
- Architect: Delaney, O'Connor & Schultz (for 1927 church)
- Style: Collegiate Gothic Gothic Revival

Administration
- Archdiocese: Archdiocese of New York

Clergy
- Archbishop: Timothy Cardinal Dolan
- Pastor(s): Fr. Luis Vera, O.S.A.

St. Nicholas of Tolentine Catholic Church is a parish in the Archdiocese of New York, located at Fordham Road at University Avenue, in the Bronx, New York City. The substantial stone twin-towered church has been dubbed "The Cathedral of the Bronx."

== History ==
The parish was founded by the Augustinian friars on April 22, 1906, with the first Mass occurring in a small garage on North Street near Jerome Avenue. Immediately from 1906 on, construction of a permanent church with parochial buildings on Andrews Avenue and Fordham Road commenced. The complex would consist of a two-story "combination building," a parochial school-over-church building, along with a separate rectory. Monsignor J. F. Mooney, V.G. laid the cornerstone on July 15, 1906. the church was dedicated by Archbishop (later Cardinal) Farley on September 15, 1907. In 1914, the property was valued at $135,000. By 1914, the University Avenue and Fordham Road property that the present church stands on was purchased and being prepared. The present Collegiate Gothic church structure was built in 1927 to the designs of Delaney, O'Connor & Schultz. The building has been incorrectly dated by other sources as being erected in the early 1900s, or sometime in the 1950s.

On March 5, 2010, a suspicious two-alarm blaze filled the sanctuary with flames and smoke. "The fire started in a former confessional-turned-storage room in the vestibule of the church, blocking the main entrance." The Rev. Joseph Girone evacuated worshipers through the rectory after principal exits were blocked. Some firemen were injured from a falling plaster ceiling. FDNY Deputy Chief Kevin Scanlon called the fire "suspicious" that "accelerated rapidly [and] it was a heavy fire that didn't have the normal flow of a fire." A string of arson attacks against Bronx churches had recently claimed the Glory of Christ Church in December 2009 in Parkchester. Despite the fire, church services were resumed at the parish school's gym, adjacent to the church.

The parish is still staffed by the Augustinian friars.

== St. Nicholas of Tolentine Elementary School ==
The parochial school, which opened in 1907, was run by the Augustinian Fathers and the Sisters of Charity. In 1914, the school was run by 2 Sisters of Charity and 1 lay teacher. The school had 45 male and 45 female pupils. The original school was over the church, and took over the whole building when the present church building was completed in 1927. The school has around 376 students from pre-kindergarten to eighth grade. The school closed June 2019.

== Former St. Nicholas of Tolentine High School ==
There was a St. Nicholas of Tolentine High School, which the parish operated from 1927 to 1991.

It was famous for its high school basketball team.

The teaching faculty were a mix of layperson educators, Augustinian priests, and Dominican nuns.
