= Brian Reese =

American basketball player and coach

Monmouth Hawks
- Title: Assistant coach
- League: Colonial Athletic Association

Personal information
- Born: July 2, 1971 (age 55) Brooklyn, New York, U.S.
- Listed height: 6 ft 6 in (1.98 m)
- Listed weight: 215 lb (98 kg)

Career information
- High school: St. Nicholas of Tolentine (The Bronx, New York)
- College: North Carolina (1990–1994)
- NBA draft: 1994: undrafted
- Playing career: 1994–2001
- Position: Small forward
- Coaching career: 2010–present

Career history

Playing
- 1994: Long Island Surf
- 1995–1996: Tapiolan Honka
- 1996: Long Island Surf
- 1996–1997: Tapiolan Honka
- 1997: NMKY Helsinki
- 1997: Long Island Surf
- 1997–1998: Paris Basket Racing
- 1999: Þór Akureyri
- 1999–2000: BCC Mars
- 2000–2001: Manchester Giants

Coaching
- 2010-2011: High Point (assistant)
- 2011–2015: Monmouth (assistant)
- 2015–2016: Georgian Court
- 2016–2021: Illinois State (assistant)
- 2022–present: Monmouth (assistant)

Career highlights
- As player: NCAA champion (1993); McDonald's All-American (1990); Second-team Parade All-American (1990)

Brian Derreck Reese (born July 2, 1971) is an American former professional basketball player and current assistant coach at Monmouth. He was a 6'6" player from the Bronx, NY. Reese went to High School at St. Nicholas of Tolentine High School where he was a McDonald's All-American.

== Amateur career ==
Reese was born in Brooklyn, New York. He attended St. Nicholas of Tolentine High School in the Bronx where he played on the school's basketball team with Malik Sealy and Adrian Autry. He won the NCAA National Championship under Dean Smith with the University of North Carolina in 1993. He felt Dean Smith was a major influence on his life.

== Professional career ==
Reese went on to play professionally in Austria, Belgium, the Dominican Republic, England (Manchester Giants), Finland, Iceland, France, Korea, Taiwan and Puerto Rico. He also played three seasons for the Long Island Surf of the United States Basketball League (USBL).

== Coaching career ==
He served as the coach at Georgian Court University. He was an assistant coach at Monmouth University previously before accepting a position at ISU.
