= Dave Habiger =

American businessman and entrepreneur

- Born: Joliet, Illinois, U.S.
- Education: St. Norbert College (BS); University of Chicago (MBA)
- Children: 2

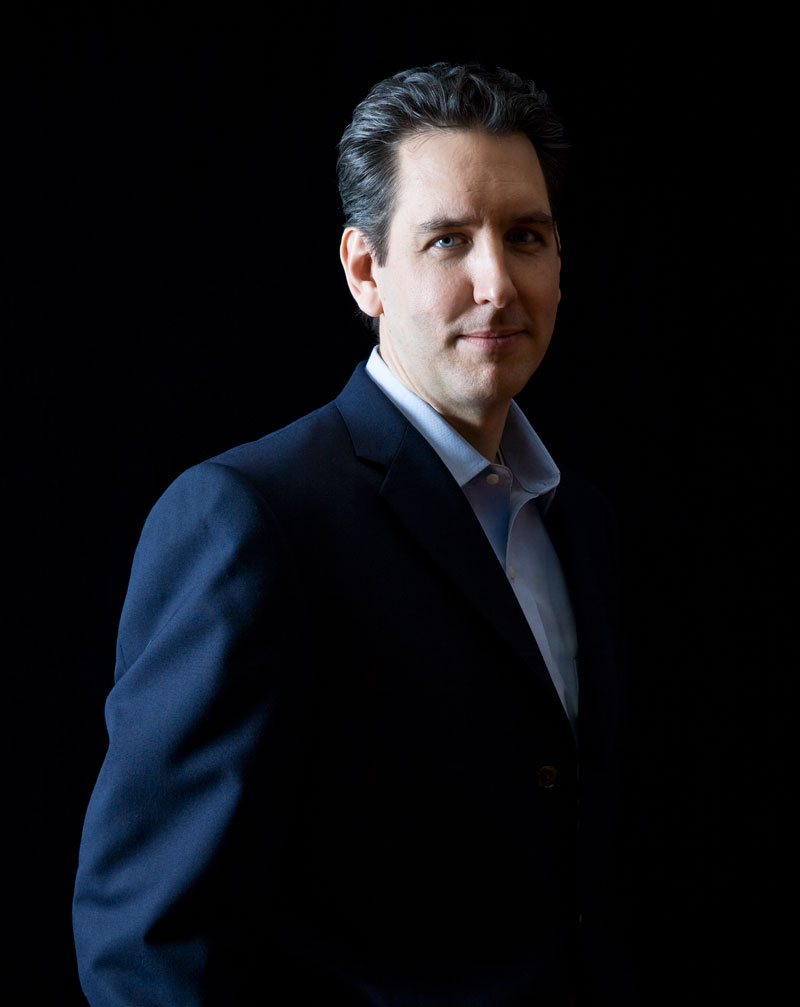

David Habiger (born 1969) is an American businessman and entrepreneur.

== Early life and education ==
Habiger was born in Joliet, Illinois. He received a bachelor's degree in business administration from St. Norbert College and began producing documentaries after graduation. In 1991, he founded Providence Productions, which focused on funding, producing, and distributing documentaries. In 1997, he received his MBA from the University of Chicago.

Habiger delivered the 2016 commencement address at St. Norbert College.

== Career ==
He began working with the ex-Lucasfilm team and founding members of Sonic Solutions in 1992, where he served as president and chief executive officer. Under his leadership, Sonic became one of the largest global providers of premium movies and TV shows via the internet and consumer electronic devices. He emphasizes engineering excellence and empowering the engineers in an organization. Since its IPO, the company has been named one of Forbes, Fortune, and Businessweek’s fastest growing companies on multiple occasions. Habiger opened the NASDAQ market in 2008 and 2010. In 2011, he sold Sonic to Rovi Corporation. He was appointed as NDS chief executive officer in July 2011. Shortly after filing with the SEC for its NYSE-listed IPO, Habiger announced the sale of NDS to Cisco for $5 billion; the sale was closed in the second half of 2012. Beginning in 2012, he became a board member and CEO of Textura Corp through its IPO listing on the NYSE and through its sale to Oracle in 2016. Habiger is founder and partner at Silicon Media Partners. Habiger served as president and CEO of J.D. Power from 2018 through 2025.

Habiger has been a pioneer in modern electric cars since the early 2000s when he co-founded an EV start-up focused on the conversion of ICE vehicles to fully electric. He was Chairman for the Electric Vehicle Commission and is a member of the Society of Automotive Engineers.

He was named an Ernst & Young Entrepreneur of the Year. In 2008, he was chosen as one of Corporate Leader Magazine's 40-under-40 business leaders. The Hollywood Reporter chose him as one of 2010s Digital Power 50. Between March 2009 and March 2011 he oversaw a 2388% increase in Sonic's market capitalization as the company reinvented its core business, winning an Emmy Award for "technical contributions to the film and television industry." He sold Sonic to Rovi Corporation in early 2011 at a 66% premium – slightly under $1 billion after stock adjustments to the deal.

He serves as a director on the Chicago Federal Reserve Board. He serves on the SABOR (Systems Activities, Bank Operations, and Risk) Committee and is the Chairman of the Governance & HR Committee for the Federal Reserve. He also serves on various public and private boards, including serving on the board of directors for the Automotive Hall of Fame.

In 2019, he hosted a discussion with Apple co-founder Steve Wozniak at the Auto Revolution 2019 event, where Wozniak, an avid proponent for self-driving vehicles, explained that true "Level 5" autonomy, in which cars are completely self-driving, is still a long way from mainstream commercialization.

Habiger was recognized as an Automotive News All-Star in 2021 for his leadership in the automotive industry.

Habiger sits on the advisory boards for the Heroic Imagination Project, the University of Chicago, and the Network for Teaching Entrepreneurship, which provides entrepreneurial education to young people from low-income communities. He is a member of the board of trustees at Rush University Medical Center. He is a member of the National Academy of Television Arts and Sciences and Society of Motion Picture & Television Engineers.
