= J.D. Power =

American market research company

JD Power
- Formerly: J.D. Power & Associates, J.D. Power
- Type: Private
- Industry: Market research
- Founded: 1968; 58 years ago, in Los Angeles, California
- Founder: J. D. Power III
- Headquarters: Troy, Michigan, United States
- Key people: Joshua Peirez (president and CEO)
- Owner: Thoma Bravo
- Number of employees: >2,300
- Website: jdpower.com

JD Power is an American data analytics, software, and consumer intelligence company founded in 1968. The company specializes in the use of big data, artificial intelligence, and algorithmic models examining consumer behavior. The firm's business model has evolved to emphasize data and analytics and software products. Industry benchmarking studies are used to evaluate detailed consumer interactions and trends across the automotive, financial services, healthcare, home, insurance, technology, media and telecom, travel and hospitality, senior living, and utilities industries.

The company was founded in 1968 by James David Power III. It is headquartered and has one office in Troy, Michigan. Private equity firm Thoma Bravo, LLC announced it was acquiring JD Power in July 2019. The company announced a merger with Autodata Solutions, a provider of data and software for the automotive ecosystem, in December 2019. In May 2025, Joshua Peirez was named CEO having been CEO of Sterling Check Corp since 2018.

== History ==
JD Power was founded in 1968 by James David Power III.

Power had previously worked in advertising and customer research for the Ford Motor Company, where he felt customer satisfaction data was too often overlooked. He later joined Marplan, and then McCulloch, a chainsaw manufacturer. He left his position at McCulloch and founded J.D. Power and Associates on April 1, 1968, working at first from his kitchen table. The company incorporated on February 7, 1969. The "associates" referred to in the firm's title were his wife, who assisted him with market research, and his children, who helped stuff envelopes.

JD Power began surveying car owners about the various attributes of their vehicles. This enabled the company to gather a significant amount of data on how to improve cars, which it used to assist and guide OEMs and car manufacturers to build better cars. In 1973, the company first drew significant national attention when Julia P. Power discovered a design flaw in the O-rings of certain Mazda rotary engines, working from the results of customer surveys. The report was then publicized by The Wall Street Journal and widely repeated in other outlets. In the following years, J.D. Power and Associates became particularly known for its automotive customer satisfaction rankings, while continuing to work in other areas such as food and computers. The firm created the first Dealer Attitude Study in 1976 and the U.S. Automotive Customer Satisfaction Index in 1981.

Subaru paid JD Power to mention the results of their ranking in the JD Power awards in 1984 and became the first company to mention their results in a television commercial, which aired during Super Bowl XVIII. According to JD Power, their rankings have appeared in more than 350,000 television commercial airings and two billion copies of various print advertisements. JD Power expanded its offerings to sell financial and insurance products through car dealerships in 2017.

In 2002, the company moved its headquarters from Agoura Hills, California, to Westlake Village in Ventura County. In 2005, Power retired and sold the firm to McGraw Hill Financial and also resigned as chairman. In September 2016, McGraw Hill (renamed S&P Global Inc. in April 2016) sold JD Power to XIO Group for US $1.1bn. In March 2018, Dave Habiger was named its president and CEO, succeeding Finbarr O'Neill who completed a ten-year tenure. In May 2025, Joshua Peirez was named CEO, succeeding Habiger.

In 2019, JD Power was acquired by Chicago-based private equity firm Thoma Bravo and, as part of this acquisition, JD Power was merged with Autodata Solutions, a provider of data and software for the automotive industry. The combined company's headquarters moved to Troy, Michigan, following the merger.

In September 2023, JD Power announced the takeover of Euro-Australian automotive data company Autovista.

== Benchmarking studies ==
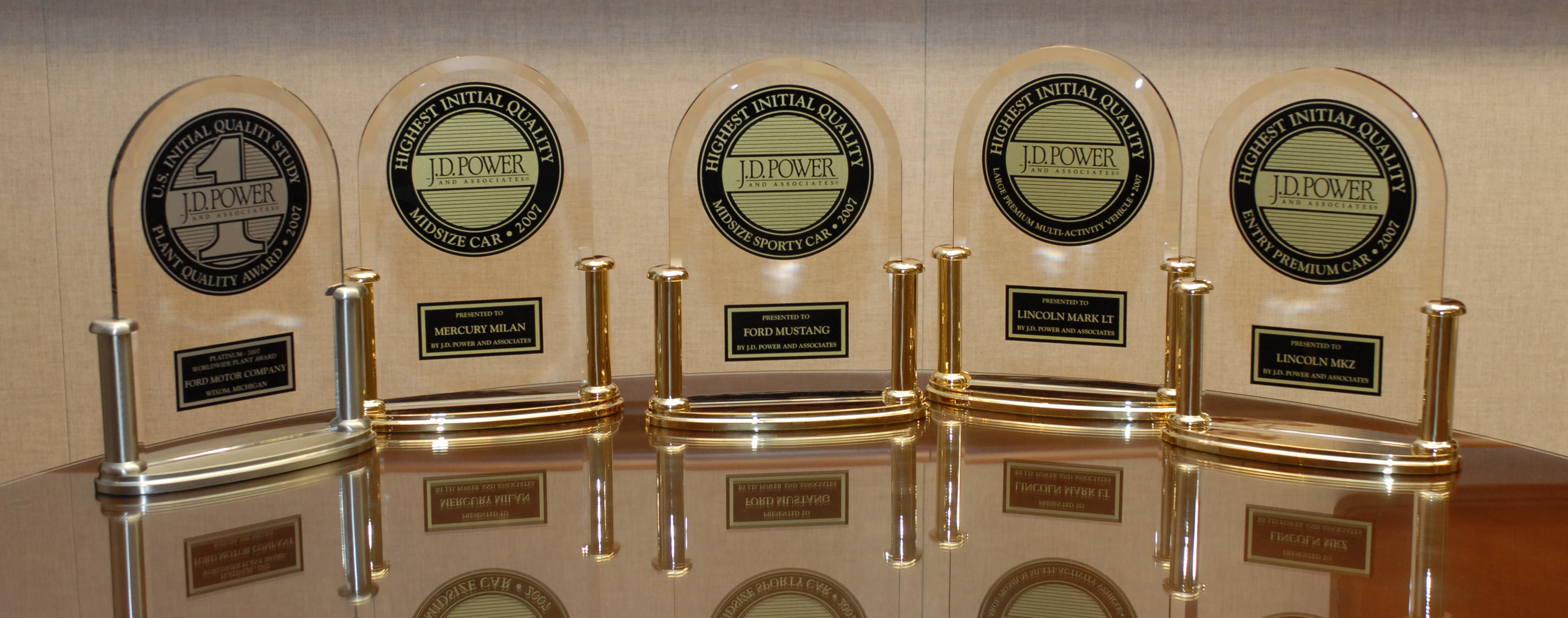
A selection of the awards presented to the Ford Motor Company by J.D. Power in 2007

JD Power conducts nearly 200 benchmarking studies annually, drawn from analysis of consumer behavior and market data, that are fully self-funded and fully independent. The firm conducts industry benchmarking studies of hundreds of leading brands in the following industries: automotive, financial services, healthcare, home, insurance, technology, media and telecom, travel and hospitality, senior living, and utilities.

The firm does not earn money on its product rankings, although using the logo and referring to results in advertising requires paying a licensing fee. Most of the firm's revenue comes from corporations that seek data for internal use.

JD Power research is conducted in the local languages of India, Japan, Taiwan, China, Philippines, Indonesia, Singapore, Thailand, Malaysia, Vietnam, Canada, Mexico, Europe, Australia, Germany, UAE, and the UK.

The company's longest-running benchmark studies are focused on the automotive industry. The Vehicle Dependability Study (VDS) measures problems experienced after three years of ownership, while the Initial Quality Study (IQS) measures problems experienced within the first 90 days of ownership. Other well-known auto industry studies include the Automotive Performance, Execution and Layout (APEAL) Study, which reflects consumer's attitudes towards a vehicle's attributes as well as dealership service and customer purchasing experience surveys. Similar version of the Vehicle Dependability Study and Initial Quality Studies are performed internationally and usually released with the country's name, followed by the same title, like the China Initial Quality Study.

== See also ==
- Marketing research
- Customer satisfaction research
- Participation trophy
