= Jungo Connectivity =

Israeli software company

Jungo Connectivity Ltd.
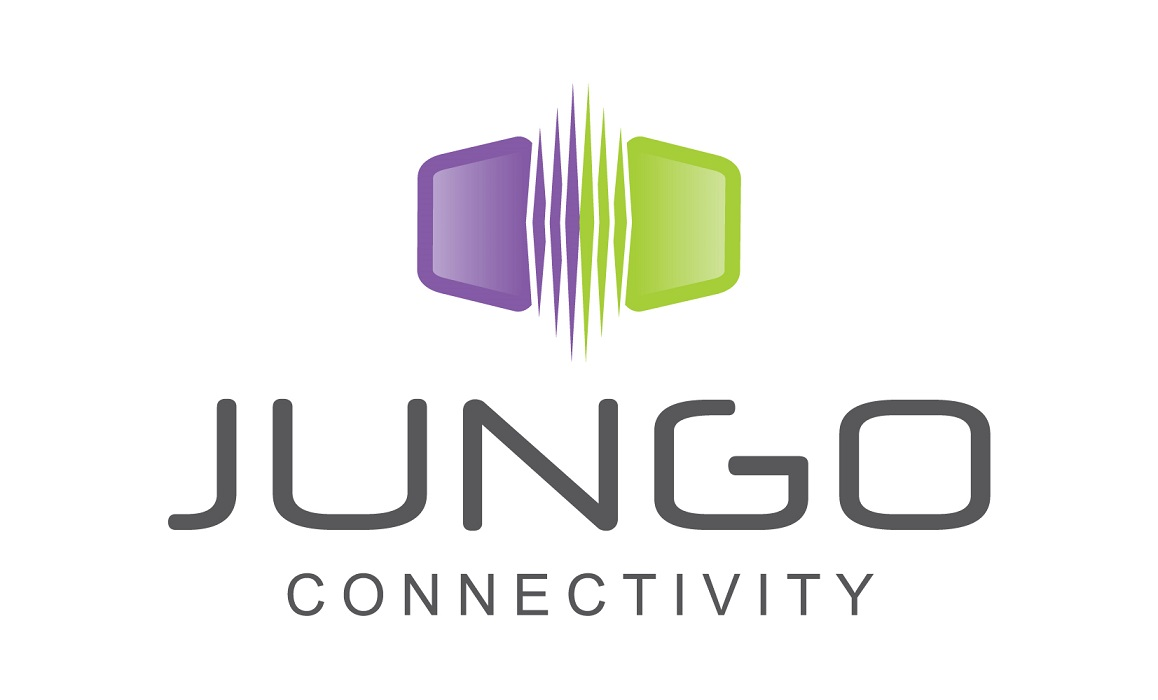
- Company type: Public
- Traded as: TASE: JNGO
- Industry: Automotive, Driver Development, HMI
- Founded: 2013
- Founder: Ophir Herbst
- Headquarters: Netanya, Israel
- Key people: Ophir Herbst (Chairman, Founder) Opher Suhami (CEO)
- Products: CoDriver, VuDrive, WinDriver, MagiaTouch
- Website: www.jungo.com

Jungo Connectivity is an Israeli software company that specializes in driver monitoring system (DMS) software and device driver development.

== History ==
Jungo Connectivity was founded in 2013 as an automotive software divestiture from Cisco Systems. Jungo Connectivity CEO and founder is Ophir Herbst. On July 28, 2021, Jungo completed an initial public offering on the Tel Aviv Stock Exchange, traded under the ticker JNGO.
