= 1987–88 Notre Dame Fighting Irish men's basketball team =

American college basketball season

1987–88 Notre Dame Fighting Irish men's basketball

NCAA tournament
- Conference: Independent
- Record: 20–9
- Head coach: Digger Phelps (17th season)
- Home arena: Joyce Center

1987–88 NCAA Division I men's basketball independents standings
	Conf.				Overall
Team	W		L	PCT	W		L	PCT
Akron		–		–	21	–	7	.750
DePaul		–		–	22	–	8	.733
Notre Dame		–		–	20	–	9	.690
Wright State		–		–	16	–	11	.593
Miami (FL)		–		–	17	–	14	.548
UMBC		–		–	13	–	15	.464
Dayton		–		–	13	–	18	.419
Brooklyn		–		–	11	–	17	.393
Central Connecticut State		–		–	10	–	18	.357
Marquette		–		–	10	–	18	.357
Nicholls State		–		–	10	–	18	.357
U.S. International		–		–	10	–	18	.357
UMKC		–		–	9	–	18	.333
Central Florida		–		–	9	–	19	.321
Florida International		–		–	9	–	19	.321
Chicago State		–		–	8	–	20	.286
Northern Illinois		–		–	8	–	20	.286
Oral Roberts		–		–	8	–	21	.276
Southeastern Louisiana		–		–	7	–	21	.250
Rankings from AP Poll

The 1987–88 Notre Dame Fighting Irish men's basketball team represented the University of Notre Dame during the 1987-88 college basketball season. The Irish were led by head coach Digger Phelps, in his 17th season, and played their home games at the Joyce Center in Notre Dame, Indiana. Notre Dame earned an at-large bid to the NCAA tournament where they fell in the opening round to SMU. The team finished with a 20–9 record.

== Roster ==
1987–88 Notre Dame Fighting Irish men's basketball team
Players
Coaches

Pos.	#	Name	Height	Weight	Year	Hometown
G	4	David Rivers	6 ft 2 in (1.88 m)	170 lb (77 kg)	Sr	Jersey City, New Jersey
F	54	Gary Voce	6 ft 9 in (2.06 m)	230 lb (104 kg)	Sr	Bronx, New York

Head coach

- Digger Phelps (Rider)

Assistant coach(es)

Legend

- (C) Team captain
- (S) Suspended
- (I) Ineligible
- (W) Walk-on
- Injured
- Current redshirt

== Schedule and results ==
Date time, TV	Rank^{#}	Opponent^{#}	Result	Record	Site city, state
Regular Season
Dec 1, 1987*		at No. 5 Indiana	L 59–76	0–1	Assembly Hall; Bloomington, Indiana
Dec 5, 1987*		vs. No. 14 Louisville; Big Four Classic	W 69–54	1–1	RCA Dome; Indianapolis, Indiana
Dec 8, 1987*	No. 19	Boston University	W 74–49	2–1	Joyce Center; Notre Dame, Indiana
Dec 10, 1987*	No. 19	Prairie View A&M	W 89–52	3–1	Joyce Center; Notre Dame, Indiana
Dec 12, 1987*	No. 19	at DePaul	L 69–73 ^{OT}	3–2	Rosemont Horizon; Rosemont, Illinois
Dec 19, 1987*		Valparaiso	W 88–49	4–2	Joyce Center; Notre Dame, Indiana
Dec 28, 1987*		Saint Joseph's (IN)	W 91–70	5–2	Joyce Center; Notre Dame, Indiana
Dec 30, 1987*		at St. Bonaventure	W 64–49	6–2	Reilly Center; St. Bonaventure, New York
Jan 2, 1988*		at La Salle	W 68–59	7–2	The Palestra; Philadelphia, Pennsylvania
Jan 4, 1988*		at Lafayette	L 68–83	7–3	Kirby Sports Center; Easton, Pennsylvania
Jan 9, 1988*		at Marquette	W 62–44	8–3	MECCA Arena; Milwaukee, Wisconsin
Jan 13, 1988*		Yale	W 85–59	9–3	Joyce Center (10,487); Notre Dame, Indiana
Jan 16, 1988*		DePaul	L 71–77	9–4	Joyce Center; Notre Dame, Indiana
Jan 21, 1988*		Penn	W 67–48	10–4	Joyce Center; Notre Dame, Indiana
Jan 23, 1988*		No. 16 Kansas	W 80–76	11–4	Joyce Center; Notre Dame, Indiana
Jan 27, 1988*		Butler	W 85–66	12–4	Joyce Center; Notre Dame, Indiana
Jan 31, 1988*		vs. No. 9 Kentucky	L 69–78	12–5	Freedom Hall; Louisville, Kentucky
Feb 2, 1988*		Maryland	L 75–78	12–6	Joyce Center; Notre Dame, Indiana
Feb 7, 1988*		at No. 4 Duke	L 61–70	12–7	Cameron Indoor Stadium; Durham, North Carolina
Feb 10, 1988*		Fordham	W 64–59	13–7	Joyce Center; Notre Dame, Indiana
Feb 14, 1988*		UCLA	W 73–66	14–7	Joyce Center; Notre Dame, Indiana
Feb 16, 1988*		vs. Rutgers	W 75–62	15–7	Meadowlands Arena; East Rutherford, New Jersey
Feb 18, 1988*		Dayton	W 58–47	16–7	Joyce Center; Notre Dame, Indiana
Feb 22, 1988*		Creighton	W 66–54	17–7	Joyce Center; Notre Dame, Indiana
Feb 27, 1988*		No. 17 Vanderbilt	L 66–75	17–8	Joyce Center; Notre Dame, Indiana
Mar 5, 1988*		Marquette	W 72–50	18–8	Joyce Center; Notre Dame, Indiana
Mar 7, 1988*		Hardin-Simmons	W 100–71	19–8	Joyce Center; Notre Dame, Indiana
Mar 12, 1988*		at Dayton	W 72–59	20–8	University of Dayton Arena; Dayton, Ohio
NCAA Tournament
Mar 17, 1988*	(10 E)	vs. (7 E) Southern Methodist; First round	L 75–83	20–9	Dean Smith Center; Chapel Hill, North Carolina
*Non-conference game. ^{#}Rankings from AP Poll/UPI Poll. (#) Tournament seedings in parentheses. E=East.
