= 1987–88 NC State Wolfpack men's basketball team =

American college basketball season

1987–88 NC State Wolfpack men's basketball

NCAA tournament, Round of 64
- Conference: Atlantic Coast Conference

Ranking
- Coaches: No. 11
- AP: No. 14
- Record: 24–8 (10–4 ACC)
- Head coach: Jim Valvano (8th season)
- Assistant coaches: Ray Martin (8th season); Dick Stewart (2nd season)
- Home arena: Reynolds Coliseum

1987–88 ACC men's basketball standings
	Conf.				Overall
Team	W		L	PCT	W		L	PCT
No. 7 North Carolina	11	–	3	.786	27	–	7	.794
No. 14 NC State	10	–	4	.714	24	–	8	.750
No. 5 Duke †	9	–	5	.643	28	–	7	.800
Georgia Tech	8	–	6	.571	22	–	10	.688
Maryland	6	–	8	.429	18	–	13	.581
Virginia	5	–	9	.357	13	–	18	.419
Clemson	4	–	10	.286	14	–	15	.483
Wake Forest	3	–	11	.214	10	–	18	.357
† 1988 ACC tournament winner Rankings from AP Poll

The 1987–88 NC State Wolfpack men's basketball team represented North Carolina State University during the 1987–88 men's college basketball season. It was Jim Valvano's eighth season as head coach.

== Roster ==
1987–88 NC State Wolfpack men's basketball team
Players
Coaches

Pos.	#	Name	Height	Weight	Year	Hometown
G	11	Kelsey Weems	6 ft 2 in (1.88 m)	180 lb (82 kg)	Jr	Atlanta, Georgia
G	13	Chris Corchiani	6 ft 0 in (1.83 m)	180 lb (82 kg)	Fr	Coral Gables, Florida
G	14	Vinny Del Negro	6 ft 5 in (1.96 m)	195 lb (88 kg)	Sr	Springfield, Massachusetts
F	19	Byron Tucker	6 ft 9 in (2.06 m)	195 lb (88 kg)	Fr	Oxon Hill, Maryland
G	21	Rodney Monroe	6 ft 3 in (1.91 m)	170 lb (77 kg)	Fr	Baltimore, Maryland
F	22	Brian Howard	6 ft 7 in (2.01 m)	207 lb (94 kg)	So	Winston-Salem, North Carolina
G/F	23	Sean Green	6 ft 6 in (1.98 m)	210 lb (95 kg)	Fr	Long Island City, New York
G/F	30	Kenny Poston	6 ft 6 in (1.98 m)	203 lb (92 kg)	Jr	Cherryville, North Carolina
F	32	Avie Lester	6 ft 9 in (2.06 m)	217 lb (98 kg)	So	Roxboro, North Carolina
F	33	Charles Shackleford	6 ft 10 in (2.08 m)	225 lb (102 kg)	Sr	Kinston, North Carolina
G	35	Quentin Jackson	6 ft 0 in (1.83 m)	187 lb (85 kg)	Sr	Annapolis, Maryland
F	52	Chucky Brown	6 ft 8 in (2.03 m)	203 lb (92 kg)	Jr	New York, New York
F	54	Brian D'Amico	6 ft 10 in (2.08 m)	220 lb (100 kg)	So	Reading, Pennsylvania

Head coach

- Jim Valvano (Rutgers)

Assistant coach(es)

- Ray Martin (Notre Dame)
- Dick Stewart

Legend

- (C) Team captain
- (S) Suspended
- (I) Ineligible
- (W) Walk-on
- Injured
- Current redshirt

== Schedule ==
Date time, TV	Rank^{#}	Opponent^{#}	Result	Record	Site city, state
November 30*		Vermont	W 108–58	1–0	Reynolds Coliseum; Raleigh, NC
December 2*		Tampa	W 85–60	2–0	Reynolds Coliseum; Raleigh, NC
December 19*		No. 17 Kansas	L 67–74	2–1	Reynolds Coliseum; Raleigh, NC
December 21*		Winthrop	W 93–59	3–1	Reynolds Coliseum; Raleigh, NC
December 23*		at UC Santa Barbara	L 78–96	3–2	The Thunderdome; Santa Barbara, CA
December 27*		vs. Creighton; Rainbow Classic	W 86–55	4–2	Stan Sheriff Center; Honolulu, HI
December 28*		vs. Louisville; Rainbow Classic	W 80–75	5–2	Stan Sheriff Center; Honolulu, HI
December 29*		vs. Arizona State; Rainbow Classic	W 83–71	6–2	Stan Sheriff Center; Honolulu, HI
January 3*		Cornell	W 95–72	7–2	Reynolds Coliseum; Raleigh, NC
January 6		Clemson	W 70–61	8–2 (1–0)	Reynolds Coliseum; Raleigh, NC
January 12*		Morgan State	W 103–54	9–2	Reynolds Coliseum; Raleigh, NC
January 16		Georgia Tech	W 76–74	10–2 (2–0)	Alexander Memorial Coliseum; Atlanta, GA
January 20	No. 20	at Wake Forest	L 67–71	10–3 (2–1)	Winston-Salem Memorial Coliseum; Winston-Salem, NC
January 24	No. 20	No. 2 North Carolina	L 73–77	10–4 (2–2)	Reynolds Coliseum; Raleigh, NC
January 27		at Maryland	W 83–81	11–4 (3–2)	Cole Field House; College Park, MD
January 31		DePaul	W 71–66	12–4	Reynolds Coliseum; Raleigh, NC
February 3		Virginia	W 75–69	13–4 (4–2)	Reynolds Coliseum; Raleigh, NC
February 6		at No. 4 Duke	W 77–74	14–4 (5–2)	Cameron Indoor Stadium; Durham, NC
February 8		Charleston Southern	W 116–68	15–4	Reynolds Coliseum; Raleigh, NC
February 11	No. 16	No. 6 North Carolina	L 73–75	15–5 (5–3)	Dean Smith Center; Chapel Hill, NC
February 13*	No. 16	Louisville	W 101–89	16–5	Reynolds Coliseum; Raleigh, NC
February 15*	No. 16	Maryland–Baltimore County	W 99–77	17–5	Reynolds Coliseum; Raleigh, NC
February 18	No. 14	at Clemson	W 88–63	18–5 (6–3)	Littlejohn Coliseum; Clemson, SC
February 20	No. 14	Georgia Tech	L 84–87	18–6 (6–4)	Reynolds Coliseum; Raleigh, NC
February 24		No. 5 Duke	W 89–78	19–6 (7–4)	Reynolds Coliseum; Raleigh, NC
February 27		at Virginia	W 64–63	20–6 (8–4)	University Hall; Charlottesville, VA
February 29		UNC Asheville	W 87–76	21–6	Reynolds Coliseum; Raleigh, NC
March 3	No. 16	Maryland	W 74–68	22–6 (9–4)	Reynolds Coliseum; Raleigh, NC
March 6	No. 16	Wake Forest	W 86–82	23–6 (10–4)	Reynolds Coliseum; Raleigh, NC
ACC Tournament
March 11*	(2) No. 11	vs. (7) Clemson; Quarterfinals	W 79–72	24–6	Greensboro Coliseum; Greensboro, NC
March 12*	(2) No. 11	vs. (3) No. 8 Duke; Semifinals	L 71–73	24–7	Greensboro Coliseum; Greensboro, NC
NCAA Tournament
March 18*; CBS	(3 MW) No. 14	vs. (14 MW) Murray State; First Round	L 75–78	24–8	Bob Devaney Sports Center; Lincoln, NE
*Non-conference game. ^{#}Rankings from AP Poll. (#) Tournament seedings in parentheses.

== Rankings ==
Ranking movements Legend: ██ Increase in ranking ██ Decrease in ranking — = Not ranked
	Week																	
Poll	Pre	1	2	3	4	5	6	7	8	9	10	11	12	13	14	15	16	Final
AP	—	—	—	—	—	—	—	—	20	—	—	16	14	—	16	11	14	14
Coaches	Not released	20	—	—	—	—	—	—	20	—	—	—	14	18	12	11	11	13
