= 1987–88 Southern Jaguars basketball team =

American college basketball season

1987–88 Southern Jaguars basketball

SWAC Regular season champions SWAC tournament champions

NCAA tournament
- Conference: Southwestern Athletic Conference
- Record: 24–7 (12–2 SWAC)
- Head coach: Ben Jobe (2nd season)
- Home arena: F. G. Clark Center

1987–88 SWAC men's basketball standings
	Conf.				Overall
Team	W		L	PCT	W		L	PCT
Southern †	12	–	2	.857	24	–	7	.774
Texas Southern	11	–	3	.786	21	–	8	.724
Grambling State	9	–	5	.643	13	–	17	.433
Jackson State	7	–	7	.500	13	–	15	.464
Mississippi Valley State	5	–	9	.357	8	–	20	.286
Alcorn State	5	–	9	.357	8	–	21	.276
Alabama State	4	–	10	.286	8	–	20	.286
Prairie View A&M	3	–	11	.214	5	–	22	.185
† 1988 SWAC tournament winner Rankings from AP Poll

The 1987–88 Southern Jaguars basketball team represented Southern University during the 1987–88 NCAA Division I men's basketball season. The Jaguars, led by head coach Ben Jobe, played their home games at the F. G. Clark Center and were members of the Southwestern Athletic Conference. They finished the season 24–7, 12–2 in SWAC play to finish in first place. They were champions of the SWAC tournament to earn an automatic bid to the 1988 NCAA tournament where they lost in the opening round to Kentucky, 99–84.

== Roster ==
1987–88 Southern Jaguars men's basketball team
Players
Coaches

Pos.	#	Name	Height	Weight	Year	Hometown
G	15	Avery Johnson	5 ft 10 in (1.78 m)	180 lb (82 kg)	Sr	New Orleans, Louisiana
G	34	Bobby Phills	6 ft 5 in (1.96 m)	190 lb (86 kg)	Fr	Baton Rouge, Louisiana

Head coach

- Ben Jobe

Assistant coach(es)

Legend

- (C) Team captain
- (S) Suspended
- (I) Ineligible
- (W) Walk-on
- Injured
- Current redshirt

== Schedule ==
Date time, TV	Rank^{#}	Opponent^{#}	Result	Record	Site (attendance) city, state
Non-conference Regular season
Nov 27, 1987*		vs. Georgia	L 87–93	0–1	
Nov 29, 1987*		Belhaven (MS)	W 97–75	1–1	F.G. Clark Center; Baton Rouge, Louisiana
Dec 1, 1987*		at Sam Houston State	L 88–104	1–2	Bernard Johnson Coliseum; Huntsville, Texas
Dec 4, 1987*		Centenary (LA)	W 98–96	2–2	F.G. Clark Center; Baton Rouge, Louisiana
Dec 5, 1987*		at Louisiana State	L 77–98	2–3	LSU Assembly Center; Baton Rouge, Louisiana
Dec 8, 1988*		at Rice	W 107–86	3–3	Tudor Fieldhouse; Houston, Texas
Dec 11, 1988*		Tuskegee	W 142–101	4–3	F.G. Clark Center; Baton Rouge, Louisiana
Dec 28, 1987*		at New Orleans	W 114–101	5–3	Lakefront Arena; New Orleans, Louisiana
Dec 29, 1987*		vs. No. 6 Temple; Sugar Bowl Classic	L 47–84	5–4	Louisiana Superdome (4,923); New Orleans, Louisiana
Jan 6, 1988*		Sam Houston State	W 100–78	6–4	F.G. Clark Center; Baton Rouge, Louisiana
SWAC Regular season
Jan 11, 1988		at Mississippi Valley State	W 75–59	7–4 (1–0)	Harrison HPER Complex; Itta Bena, Mississippi
Jan 16, 1988		Alabama State	W 108–90	8–4 (2–0)	F.G. Clark Center; Baton Rouge, Louisiana
Jan 18, 1988		Jackson State	W 103–94	9–4 (3–0)	F.G. Clark Center; Baton Rouge, Louisiana
Jan 20, 1988*		at Southwestern Louisiana	W 94–82	10–4	Cajundome; Lafayette, Louisiana
Jan 23, 1988		Texas Southern	W 108–96	11–4 (4–0)	F.G. Clark Center; Baton Rouge, Louisiana
Jan 25, 1988		Prairie View	W 112–76	12–4 (5–0)	F.G. Clark Center; Baton Rouge, Louisiana
Jan 30, 1988		Alcorn State	W 92–80	13–4 (6–0)	F.G. Clark Center; Baton Rouge, Louisiana
Feb 3, 1988*		Arkansas–Pine Bluff	W 129–93	14–4	F.G. Clark Center; Baton Rouge, Louisiana
Feb 6, 1988		Grambling State	W 85–74	15–4 (7–0)	F.G. Clark Center; Baton Rouge, Louisiana
Feb 8, 1988		Mississippi Valley State	W 116–83	16–4 (8–0)	F.G. Clark Center; Baton Rouge, Louisiana
Feb 13, 1988		at Alabama State	L 88–89	16–5 (8–1)	Dunn Arena; Montgomery, Alabama
Feb 15, 1988		at Grambling State	W 80–65	17–5 (9–1)	Memorial Gymnasium; Grambling, Louisiana
Feb 17, 1988		at Jackson State	W 96–92	18–5 (10–1)	Williams Assembly Center; Jackson, Mississippi
Feb 18, 1988*		Southeastern Louisiana	W 102–71	19–5	F.G. Clark Center; Baton Rouge, Louisiana
Feb 20, 1988		at Texas Southern	L 89–91	19–6 (10–2)	University Auditorium; Houston, Texas
Feb 22, 1988		at Prairie View	W 106–98	20–6 (11–2)	William J. Nicks Building; Prairie View, Texas
Feb 27, 1988		at Alcorn State	W 78–77	21–6 (12–2)	Davey Whitney Complex; Lorman, Mississippi
1988 SWAC tournament
Mar 10, 1988*		Prairie View; Quarterfinals	W 108–70	22–6	F. G. Clark Activity Center; Baton Rouge, Louisiana
Mar 11, 1988*		Alcorn State; Semifinals	W 87–73	23–6	F. G. Clark Activity Center; Baton Rouge, Louisiana
Mar 12, 1988*		Grambling State; Championship game	W 78–62	24–6	F. G. Clark Activity Center; Baton Rouge, Louisiana
1988 NCAA tournament
Mar 18, 1988*	(15 SE)	vs. (2 SE) No. 6 Kentucky; First Round	L 84–99	24–7	Riverfront Coliseum; Cincinnati, Ohio
*Non-conference game. ^{#}Rankings from AP Poll. (#) Tournament seedings in parentheses. SE=Southeast. All times are in Central Time.

== Awards and honors ==
- Avery Johnson – SWAC Player of the Year, NCAA assists leader, NCAA record single-season assists average (13.30)
