= 1987–88 Duke Blue Devils men's basketball team =

American college basketball season

1987–88 Duke Blue Devils men's basketball

ACC tournament champions

NCAA tournament, Final Four
- Conference: Atlantic Coast Conference

Ranking
- Coaches: No. 6
- AP: No. 5
- Record: 28–7 (9–5 ACC)
- Head coach: Mike Krzyzewski (8th season)
- Assistant coaches: Bob Bender (5th season); Mike Brey (1st season); Scott Easton
- Captains: Billy King; Kevin Strickland
- Home arena: Cameron Indoor Stadium

1987–88 ACC men's basketball standings
	Conf.				Overall
Team	W		L	PCT	W		L	PCT
No. 7 North Carolina	11	–	3	.786	27	–	7	.794
No. 14 NC State	10	–	4	.714	24	–	8	.750
No. 5 Duke †	9	–	5	.643	28	–	7	.800
Georgia Tech	8	–	6	.571	22	–	10	.688
Maryland	6	–	8	.429	18	–	13	.581
Virginia	5	–	9	.357	13	–	18	.419
Clemson	4	–	10	.286	14	–	15	.483
Wake Forest	3	–	11	.214	10	–	18	.357
† 1988 ACC tournament winner Rankings from AP Poll

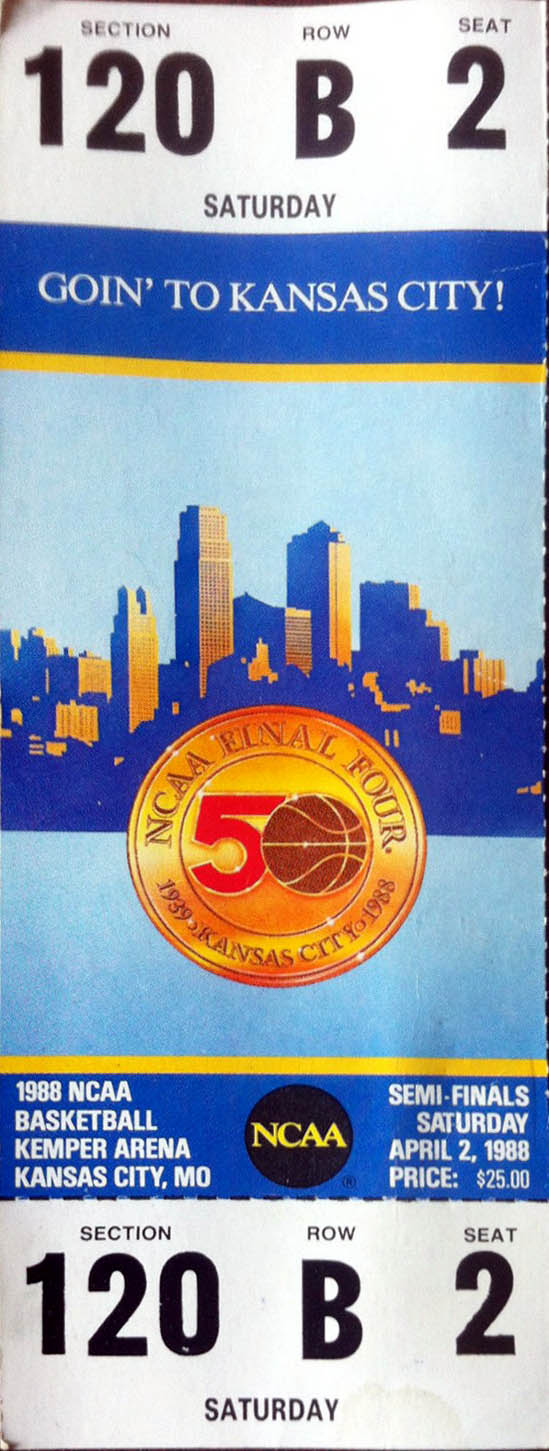
Duke earned its sixth Final Four appearance in 1988, where they suffered a loss against Kansas

The 1987–88 Duke Blue Devils men's basketball team represented Duke University. The head coach was Mike Krzyzewski. The team played its home games in the Cameron Indoor Stadium in Durham, North Carolina, and was a member of the Atlantic Coast Conference. Duke earned its sixth Final Four appearance in the 1988 NCAA Division I men's basketball tournament, where they suffered a defeat from the Danny Manning-led Kansas Jayhawks by a score of 66–59.

== Roster ==
1987–88 Duke Blue Devils men's basketball team
Players
Coaches

Pos.	#	Name	Height	Weight	Year	Previous school	Hometown
C	30	Alaa Abdelnaby	6 ft 10 in (2.08 m)	240 lb (109 kg)	So	Bloomfield	Bloomfield, NJ
F	21	Robert Brickey	6 ft 5 in (1.96 m)	205 lb (93 kg)	So	—	Fayetteville, NC
F/C	45	Clay Buckley	6 ft 10 in (2.08 m)	245 lb (111 kg)	Fr	—	Wayne, PA
C	42	George Burgin	7 ft 0 in (2.13 m)	215 lb (98 kg)	So	—	Fairfax, VA
G	13	Joe Cook	6 ft 2 in (1.88 m)	195 lb (88 kg)	Fr	—	Lincoln, IL
F/C	35	Danny Ferry	6 ft 10 in (2.08 m)	230 lb (104 kg)	Jr	DeMatha Catholic	Bowie, MD
G	3	Phil Henderson	6 ft 4 in (1.93 m)	180 lb (82 kg)	So	—	University Park, IL
F	55	Billy King (C)	6 ft 6 in (1.98 m)	205 lb (93 kg)	Sr	—	Sterling, VA
F	22	Greg Koubek	6 ft 6 in (1.98 m)	205 lb (93 kg)	Fr	—	Clifton Park, NY
F	33	John Smith	6 ft 7 in (2.01 m)	225 lb (102 kg)	Jr	—	Fort Washington, MD
G	14	Quin Snyder	6 ft 3 in (1.91 m)	180 lb (82 kg)	Jr	Mercer Island	Mercer Island, WA
G	31	Kevin Strickland (C)	6 ft 5 in (1.96 m)	190 lb (86 kg)	Sr	North Surry	Mount Airy, NC

Head coach

Mike Krzyzewski

Assistant coach(es)

Bob Bender
Mike Brey
Scott Easton

Legend

- (C) Team captain
- (S) Suspended
- (I) Ineligible
- (W) Walk-on
- Injured
- Current redshirt

Roster
Last update: 2015-02-07

== Schedule ==
Date time, TV	Rank^{#}	Opponent^{#}	Result	Record	High points	High rebounds	High assists	Site (attendance) city, state
Regular season
November 28, 1987*; 7:30 p.m.	No. 15	Appalachian State	W 110–74	1–0	17 – Strickland	8 – Ferry	6 – Ferry	Cameron Indoor Stadium (8,564); Durham, NC
November 30, 1987*; 7:30 p.m.	No. 15	East Carolina	W 94–45	2–0	14 – Koubek, Strickland	9 – Ferry, Smith	5 – Brickey	Cameron Indoor Stadium (8,564); Durham, NC
December 3, 1987*; 7:00 p.m.	No. 13	at Northwestern	W 79–57	3–0	22 – Strickland	8 – Strickland	6 – Snyder	Welsh-Ryan Arena (6,814); Evanston, IL
December 9, 1987*; 7:30 p.m.	No. 10	at Davidson	W 105–71	4–0	19 – Abdelnaby	8 – Koubek	9 – Snyder	Charlotte Coliseum (6,513); Charlotte, NC
December 21, 1987*; 7:30 p.m.	No. 10	Harvard	W 121–62	5–0	28 – Strickland	9 – Brickey	8 – Snyder	Cameron Indoor Stadium (8,564); Durham, NC
December 29, 1987*; 8:30 p.m.	No. 9	vs. No. 8 Florida; Fiesta Bowl Classic	W 93–70	6–0	21 – Strickland	9 – Brickey, Ferry	6 – Snyder	McKale Center (13,284); Tucson, AZ
December 30, 1987*; 11:00 p.m.	No. 9	vs. No. 1 Arizona; Fiesta Bowl Classic	L 85–91	6–1	25 – Ferry, Strickland	7 – Ferry, Smith	6 – Snyder	McKale Center (13,270); Tucson, AZ
January 4, 1988*; 7:30 p.m.	No. 9	William & Mary	W 101–70	7–1	26 – Ferry	7 – Ferry	6 – King, Snyder	Cameron Indoor Stadium (8,564); Durham, NC
January 6, 1988*; 7:30 p.m.	No. 9	Miami (FL)	W 107–69	8–1	23 – Ferry	8 – Ferry	8 – Snyder	Cameron Indoor Stadium (8,564); Durham, NC
January 9, 1988; 4:00 p.m.	No. 9	at Virginia	W 77–59	9–1 (1–0)	29 – Ferry	9 – Ferry	5 – Ferry	University Hall (8,005); Charlottesville, VA
January 14, 1988*; 7:30 p.m.	No. 7	St. Louis	W 69–53	10–1	18 – Snyder	7 – Abdelnaby, Strickland	6 – Ferry	Cameron Indoor Stadium (8,564); Durham, NC
January 16, 1988; 7:00 p.m.	No. 7	Maryland; Rivalry	L 69–72	10–2 (1–1)	23 – Ferry	11 – Ferry	6 – King	Cameron Indoor Stadium (8,564); Durham, NC
January 21, 1988; 8:00 p.m., ESPN	No. 9	at No. 2 North Carolina; Rivalry	W 70–69	11–2 (2–1)	22 – Strickland	10 – Ferry	7 – Ferry	Smith Center (21,444); Chapel Hill, NC
January 23, 1988; 1:30 p.m.	No. 9	at Wake Forest	W 103–70	12–2 (3–1)	29 – Ferry	6 – Brickey, Ferry	6 – Ferry, Snyder	Greensboro Coliseum (12,200); Greensboro, NC
January 25, 1988*; 7:30 p.m.	No. 9	at Stetson	W 81–78	13–2	22 – Strickland	8 – Ferry	4 – King	Ocean Center (6,517); Daytona Beach, FL
February 1, 1988; 9:00 p.m.	No. 5	Clemson	W 101–63	14–2 (4–1)	18 – Henderson	6 – Ferry	5 – King, Snyder	Cameron Indoor Stadium (8,564); Durham, NC
February 3, 1988; 9:00 p.m.	No. 4	Georgia Tech	W 78–65	15–2 (5–1)	22 – Ferry	9 – Ferry	7 – Ferry	Cameron Indoor Stadium (8,564); Durham, NC
February 6, 1988; 2:00 p.m.	No. 4	NC State	L 74–77	15–3 (5–2)	21 – Ferry	9 – Strickland	5 – King	Cameron Indoor Stadium (8,564); Durham, NC
February 7, 1988*; 3:30 p.m.	No. 4	Notre Dame	W 70–61	16–3	16 – Ferry	6 – Ferry	7 – Snyder	Cameron Indoor Stadium (8,564); Durham, NC
February 11, 1988; 7:00 p.m.	No. 8	Wake Forest	W 98–67	17–3 (6–2)	19 – Henderson	7 – Koubek	8 – Snyder	Cameron Indoor Stadium (8,564); Durham, NC
February 13, 1988; 9:00 p.m.	No. 8	Maryland; Rivalry	W 90–83	18–3 (7–2)	33 – Ferry	10 – Strickland	6 – Ferry, King	Cole Field House (14,500); College Park, MD
February 17, 1988; 7:30 p.m.	No. 6	Virginia	W 73–64	19–3 (8–2)	28 – Ferry	9 – Ferry	8 – Snyder	Cameron Indoor Stadium (8,564); Durham, NC
February 20, 1988*; 4:00 p.m.	No. 6	at Kansas	W 74–70 ^{OT}	20–3	21 – Snyder	9 – Brickey	5 – Snyder	Allen Field House (15,800); Lawrence, KS
February 24, 1988; 9:00 p.m.	No. 5	at No. 18 NC State	L 78–89	20–4 (8–3)	20 – Brickey	8 – Strickland	7 – Snyder	Reynolds Coliseum (12,400); Raleigh, NC
February 28, 1988; 4:00 p.m.	No. 5	at No. 20 Georgia Tech	L 87–91	20–5 (8–4)	24 – Ferry	10 – Ferry	12 – Snyder	Alexander Memorial Coliseum (9,117); Atlanta, GA
March 2, 1988; 7:30 p.m.	No. 9	at Clemson	L 77–79	20–6 (8–5)	20 – Snyder	10 – Brickey	7 – King	Littlejohn Coliseum (7,195); Clemson, SC
March 6, 1988; 1:00 p.m., NBC	No. 9	No. 6 North Carolina; Rivalry	W 96–81	21–6 (9–5)	24 – Strickland	9 – Ferry	11 – Snyder	Cameron Indoor Stadium (8,564); Durham, NC
ACC Tournament
March 11, 1988*; ESPN; Raycom/JP Sports	No. 8	vs. Virginia; Quarterfinals	W 60–48	22–6	20 – Ferry	8 – Brickey	4 – Snyder	Greensboro Coliseum (16,500); Greensboro, NC
March 12, 1988*; ESPN; Raycom/JP Sports	No. 8	vs. No. 11 NC State; Semifinals	W 73–71	23–6	16 – Brickey	11 – Brickey	7 – Snyder	Greensboro Coliseum (16,500); Greensboro, NC
March 13, 1988*; NBC; Raycom/JP Sports	No. 8	vs. No. 9 North Carolina; Championship	W 65–61	24–6	19 – Ferry	10 – Ferry	7 – Snyder	Greensboro Coliseum (16,500); Greensboro, NC
NCAA Tournament
March 17, 1988*; ESPN	No. 5	vs. Boston University; First Round	W 85–69	25–6	21 – Ferry	8 – Ferry	12 – Snyder	Smith Center (18,619); Chapel Hill, NC
March 19, 1988*; CBS	No. 5	vs. SMU; Second Round	W 94–79	26–6	31 – Strickland	9 – Ferry	12 – Snyder	Smith Center (20,505); Chapel Hill, NC
March 24, 1988*; CBS	No. 5	vs. Rhode Island; Sweet Sixteen	W 63–53	27–6	17 – Ferry	12 – Ferry	6 – Snyder	Meadowlands Arena (19,591); East Rutherford, NJ
March 26, 1988*; CBS	No. 5	vs. No. 1 Temple; Elite Eight	W 63–53	28–6	21 – Strickland	8 – Snyder	4 – Ferry, King	Meadowlands Arena (19,633); East Rutherford, NJ
April 2, 1988*; CBS	No. 5	vs. Kansas; Final Four	L 59–66	28–7	19 – Ferry	12 – Ferry	5 – Snyder	Kemper Arena (16,392); Kansas City, MO
*Non-conference game. ^{#}Rankings from AP Poll. (#) Tournament seedings in parentheses.

== Team players drafted into the NBA ==
No one from the men’s basketball team was selected in the 1988 NBA draft.
