= 1987–88 Georgia Tech Yellow Jackets men's basketball team =

American college basketball season

1987–88 Georgia Tech Yellow Jackets men's basketball

NCAA tournament
- Conference: Atlantic Coast Conference

Ranking
- Coaches: No. 23
- Record: 22–10 (8–6 ACC)
- Head coach: Bobby Cremins (7th season)
- Assistant coaches: Perry Clark (6th season); Kevin Cantwell (2nd season); Jimmy Hebron (7th season)
- Home arena: Alexander Memorial Coliseum

1987–88 ACC men's basketball standings
	Conf.				Overall
Team	W		L	PCT	W		L	PCT
No. 7 North Carolina	11	–	3	.786	27	–	7	.794
No. 14 NC State	10	–	4	.714	24	–	8	.750
No. 5 Duke †	9	–	5	.643	28	–	7	.800
Georgia Tech	8	–	6	.571	22	–	10	.688
Maryland	6	–	8	.429	18	–	13	.581
Virginia	5	–	9	.357	13	–	18	.419
Clemson	4	–	10	.286	14	–	15	.483
Wake Forest	3	–	11	.214	10	–	18	.357
† 1988 ACC tournament winner Rankings from AP Poll

The 1987–88 Georgia Tech Yellow Jackets men's basketball team represented Georgia Institute of Technology during the 1987–88 NCAA Division I men's basketball season. Led by head coach Bobby Cremins, the team finished the season with an overall record of 22–10 (8–6 ACC). The team reached the Round of 32 of the NCAA tournament.

== Roster ==
1987–88 Georgia Tech Yellow Jackets men's basketball team
Players
Coaches

Pos.	#	Name	Height	Weight	Year	Hometown
G/F	4	Dennis Scott	6 ft 8 in (2.03 m)	225 lb (102 kg)	Fr	Reston, Virginia
G	10	Craig Neal	6 ft 4 in (1.93 m)	165 lb (75 kg)	Sr	Washington, Indiana
G	13	Brian Oliver	6 ft 4 in (1.93 m)	205 lb (93 kg)	So	Smyrna, Georgia
G	33	Duane Ferrell	6 ft 7 in (2.01 m)	205 lb (93 kg)	Sr	Baltimore, Maryland

Head coach

- Bobby Cremins (South Carolina)

Assistant coach(es)

- Perry Clark (Gettysburg)
- Kevin Cantwell
- Jimmy Hebron

Legend

- (C) Team captain
- (S) Suspended
- (I) Ineligible
- (W) Walk-on
- Injured
- Current redshirt

== Schedule and results ==
Date time, TV	Rank^{#}	Opponent^{#}	Result	Record	Site city, state
Regular Season
Nov 20, 1987*		Alcorn State	W 114–71	1–0	Alexander Memorial Coliseum; Atlanta, Georgia
Nov 23, 1987*	No. 18	at No. 14 Florida	L 69–80	1–1	Stephen C. O'Connell Center; Gainesville, Florida
Dec 1, 1987*		Jackson State	W 79–71	2–1	Alexander Memorial Coliseum; Atlanta, Georgia
Dec 5, 1987*		Georgia	W 78–77	3–1	Alexander Memorial Coliseum; Atlanta, Georgia
Dec 12, 1987*		Augusta State	W 108–74	4–1	Alexander Memorial Coliseum; Atlanta, Georgia
Dec 16, 1987*		LSU	W 87–70	5–1	Alexander Memorial Coliseum; Atlanta, Georgia
Dec 19, 1987*		at Penn	W 79–55	6–1	The Palestra; Philadelphia, Pennsylvania
Dec 22, 1987*		Richmond	L 67–73	6–2	Alexander Memorial Coliseum; Atlanta, Georgia
Dec 29, 1987*		William & Mary	W 80–59	7–2	Alexander Memorial Coliseum; Atlanta, Georgia
Dec 30, 1987*		Auburn	W 83–72	8–2	Alexander Memorial Coliseum; Atlanta, Georgia
Jan 2, 1988*		George Washington	W 86–57	9–2	Alexander Memorial Coliseum; Atlanta, Georgia
Jan 6, 1988*		at Louisville	W 62–61	10–2	Freedom Hall; Louisville, Kentucky
Jan 10, 1988		Wake Forest	W 78–66	11–2 (1–0)	Alexander Memorial Coliseum; Atlanta, Georgia
Jan 12, 1988*		Georgia State	W 68–66	12–2	Alexander Memorial Coliseum; Atlanta, Georgia
Jan 16, 1988		NC State	L 74–76	12–3 (1–1)	Alexander Memorial Coliseum; Atlanta, Georgia
Jan 19, 1988*		North Carolina A&T	W 84–72	13–3	Alexander Memorial Coliseum; Atlanta, Georgia
Jan 23, 1988		at Virginia	L 55–58	13–4 (1–2)	University Hall; Charlottesville, Virginia
Jan 26, 1988		Clemson	W 85–76	14–4 (2–2)	Alexander Memorial Coliseum; Atlanta, Georgia
Jan 30, 1988		at No. 3 North Carolina	L 71–73	14–5 (2–3)	Dean Smith Center; Chapel Hill, North Carolina
Feb 3, 1988; 9:00 p.m.		at No. 4 Duke	L 65–78	14–6 (2–4)	Cameron Indoor Stadium (8,564); Durham, North Carolina
Feb 6, 1988*		DePaul	W 71–70	15–6	Alexander Memorial Coliseum; Atlanta, Georgia
Feb 8, 1988		at Maryland	W 96–83	16–6 (3–4)	Cole Fieldhouse; College Park, Maryland
Feb 13, 1988		at Wake Forest	W 78–75	17–6 (4–4)	Winston-Salem Memorial Coliseum; Winston-Salem, North Carolina
Feb 16, 1988		Maryland	W 104–82	18–6 (5–4)	Alexander Memorial Coliseum; Atlanta, Georgia
Feb 20, 1988		at No. 14 NC State	W 87–84	19–6 (6–4)	Reynolds Coliseum; Raleigh, North Carolina
Feb 25, 1988	No. 20	Virginia	W 76–71	20–6 (7–4)	Alexander Memorial Coliseum; Atlanta, Georgia
Feb 28, 1988; 4:00 p.m.	No. 20	No. 5 Duke	W 91–87	21–6 (8–4)	Alexander Memorial Coliseum (9,117); Atlanta, Georgia
Mar 2, 1988	No. 13	No. 6 North Carolina	L 80–97	21–7 (8–5)	Alexander Memorial Coliseum; Atlanta, Georgia
Mar 5, 1988		at Clemson	L 94–97 ^{2OT}	21–8 (8–6)	Littlejohn Coliseum; Clemson, South Carolina
ACC Tournament
Mar 11, 1988*	No. 18	vs. Maryland; Quarterfinals	L 67–84	21–9	Greensboro Coliseum; Greensboro, North Carolina
NCAA Tournament
Mar 18, 1988*	(5 E)	vs. (12 E) Iowa State; First round	W 90–78	22–9	Hartford Civic Center; Hartford, Connecticut
Mar 20, 1988*	(5 E)	vs. (13 E) Richmond; Second round	L 55–59	22–10	Hartford Civic Center; Hartford, Connecticut
*Non-conference game. ^{#}Rankings from AP Poll. (#) Tournament seedings in parentheses.
