= 1987–88 Marquette Warriors men's basketball team =

American college basketball season

1987–88 Marquette Warriors men's basketball
- Conference: Independent
- Record: 10–18
- Head coach: Bob Dukiet (2nd season)
- Assistant coach: Fred Hill (2nd season)
- Home arena: MECCA Arena

1987–88 NCAA Division I men's basketball independents standings
| | Conf. | | | | Overall |
| Team | W | | L | PCT | W | | L | PCT |
|---|---|---|---|---|---|---|---|---|
| Akron | | – | | – | 21 | – | 7 | .750 |
| DePaul | | – | | – | 22 | – | 8 | .733 |
| Notre Dame | | – | | – | 20 | – | 9 | .690 |
| Wright State | | – | | – | 16 | – | 11 | .593 |
| Miami (FL) | | – | | – | 17 | – | 14 | .548 |
| UMBC | | – | | – | 13 | – | 15 | .464 |
| Dayton | | – | | – | 13 | – | 18 | .419 |
| Brooklyn | | – | | – | 11 | – | 17 | .393 |
| Central Connecticut State | | – | | – | 10 | – | 18 | .357 |
| Marquette | | – | | – | 10 | – | 18 | .357 |
| Nicholls State | | – | | – | 10 | – | 18 | .357 |
| U.S. International | | – | | – | 10 | – | 18 | .357 |
| UMKC | | – | | – | 9 | – | 18 | .333 |
| Central Florida | | – | | – | 9 | – | 19 | .321 |
| Florida International | | – | | – | 9 | – | 19 | .321 |
| Chicago State | | – | | – | 8 | – | 20 | .286 |
| Northern Illinois | | – | | – | 8 | – | 20 | .286 |
| Oral Roberts | | – | | – | 8 | – | 21 | .276 |
| Southeastern Louisiana | | – | | – | 7 | – | 21 | .250 |
Rankings from AP Poll

The 1987–88 Marquette Warriors men's basketball team represented Marquette University during the 1987–88 men's college basketball season. The Warriors finished the regular season with a record of 10–18. This was also their final season playing at MECCA Arena.

== Roster ==
1987–88 Marquette Warriors men's basketball team
| Players | Coaches |
|---|---|
| Pos. / # / Name / Height / Weight / Year / Hometown; G / 34 / Tony Smith / 6 ft 3 in (1.91 m) / 185 lb (84 kg) / Jr / Wauwatosa, Wisconsin | Head coach: Bob Dukiet; Assistant coach(es): Fred Hill (Montclair State); Legend: (C) Team captain; (S) Suspended; (I) Ineligible; (W) Walk-on; Injured; Current redshirt; Roster |

== Schedule ==
| Date time, TV | Rank^{#} | Opponent^{#} | Result | Record | Site city, state |
|---|---|---|---|---|---|
| December 1 | | Hartford | W 70–61 | 1–0 | MECCA Arena (10,612); Milwaukee, WI |
| December 3 | | at Tennessee | L 56–82 | 1–1 | Thompson-Boling Arena (25,272); Knoxville, Tennessee |
| December 5 | | Xavier | W 67–61 | 2–1 | MECCA Arena (11,052); Milwaukee, WI |
| December 10 | | at Wisconsin | L 55–66 | 2–2 | Wisconsin Field House (9,009); Madison, WI |
| December 12 | | Western Michigan | W 77–70 | 3–2 | MECCA Arena (10,762); Milwaukee, WI |
| December 19 | | Northwestern | W 77–66 | 4–2 | MECCA Arena (10,222); Milwaukee, WI |
| December 22 | | at Minnesota | L 65–89 | 4–3 | Williams Arena (11,702); Minneapolis, Minnesota |
| December 28 | | Air Force | W 80–52 | 5–3 | MECCA Arena (9,069); Milwaukee, WI |
| December 29 | | Cleveland State | L 70–72 | 5–4 | MECCA Arena (10,018); Milwaukee, WI |
| January 3 | | vs. Kansas State | L 57–78 | 5–5 | Kemper Arena (8,850); Kansas City, Missouri |
| January 6 | | Loyola Marymount | L 98–102 | 5–6 | MECCA Arena (9,817); Milwaukee, WI |
| January 9 | | Notre Dame | L 42–62 | 5–7 | MECCA Arena (11,052); Milwaukee, WI |
| January 16 | | Miami (FL) | W 65–51 | 6–7 | MECCA Arena (10,536); Milwaukee, WI |
| January 19 | | at Iona | L 56–71 | 6–8 | Meadowlands Arena (7,480); East Rutherford, NJ |
| January 23 | | at Dayton | L 62–67 | 6–9 | University of Dayton Arena (13,452); Dayton, Ohio |
| January 27 | | at DePaul | L 66–81 | 6–10 | Allstate Arena (11,915); Rosemont, Illinois |
| February 1 | | at Fordham | L 63–83 | 6–11 | Madison Square Garden (8,600); New York |
| February 3 | | Loyola (IL) | L 69–76 | 6–12 | MECCA Arena (10,902); Milwaukee, WI |
| February 6 | | Wake Forest | W 76–57 | 7–12 | MECCA Arena (11,052); Milwaukee, WI |
| February 8 | | vs. Stetson | W 70–57 | 8–12 | (3,324); Daytona Beach, FL |
| February 10 | | Canisius | W 85–73 | 9–12 | MECCA Arena (10,680); Milwaukee, WI |
| February 13 | | Dayton | W 79–56 | 10–12 | MECCA Arena (11,052); Milwaukee, WI |
| February 17 | | at Evansville | L 72–73 | 10–13 | Roberts Stadium (9,578); Evansville, Indiana |
| February 20 | | Virginia Tech | L 75–93 | 10–14 | MECCA Arena (11,052); Milwaukee, WI |
| February 24 | | at Valparaiso | L 66–70 | 10–15 | Athletics-Recreation Center (1,474); Valparaiso, Indiana |
| March 2 | | Creighton | L 58–72 | 10–16 | MECCA Arena (10,902); Milwaukee, WI |
| March 5 | | at Notre Dame | L 50–72 | 10–17 | Joyce Center (11,418); Notre Dame, IN |
| March 12 | | DePaul | L 65–77 | 10–18 | MECCA Arena (11,052); Milwaukee, WI |
*Non-conference game. ^{#}Rankings from AP Poll. (#) Tournament seedings in parentheses.
