= 1987–88 Wright State Raiders men's basketball team =

American college basketball season

1987–88 Wright State Raiders men's basketball
- Conference: Independent
- Record: 16–11
- Head coach: Ralph Underhill (10th season)
- Assistant coaches: Jim Brown; Bob Grote; Jeff Dillon; Lenny Lyons
- Home arena: WSU PE Building

1987–88 NCAA Division I men's basketball independents standings
	Conf.				Overall
Team	W		L	PCT	W		L	PCT
Akron		–		–	21	–	7	.750
DePaul		–		–	22	–	8	.733
Notre Dame		–		–	20	–	9	.690
Wright State		–		–	16	–	11	.593
Miami (FL)		–		–	17	–	14	.548
UMBC		–		–	13	–	15	.464
Dayton		–		–	13	–	18	.419
Brooklyn		–		–	11	–	17	.393
Central Connecticut State		–		–	10	–	18	.357
Marquette		–		–	10	–	18	.357
Nicholls State		–		–	10	–	18	.357
U.S. International		–		–	10	–	18	.357
UMKC		–		–	9	–	18	.333
Central Florida		–		–	9	–	19	.321
Florida International		–		–	9	–	19	.321
Chicago State		–		–	8	–	20	.286
Northern Illinois		–		–	8	–	20	.286
Oral Roberts		–		–	8	–	21	.276
Southeastern Louisiana		–		–	7	–	21	.250
Rankings from AP Poll

The 1987–88 Wright State Raiders men's basketball team represented Wright State University in the 1987–88 NCAA NCAA Division I men's basketball season led by head coach Ralph Underhill.

== Roster ==
1987–88 Wright State Raiders men's basketball team
Players
Coaches

Pos.	#	Name	Height	Weight	Year	Previous school	Hometown
G	22	Joe Jackson	6 ft 3 in (1.91 m)	170 lb (77 kg)	Sr	George Westinghouse	Brooklyn, NY
F	40	James Jones	6 ft 4 in (1.93 m)	200 lb (91 kg)	Sr	East Kemper	Lauderdale, MS
F	24	Rondey Robinson	6 ft 7 in (2.01 m)	210 lb (95 kg)	Jr	Collins	Chicago, IL
G	20	Corey Brown	5 ft 11 in (1.8 m)	190 lb (86 kg)	So	Murray-Bergtraum	Bronx, NY
G	30	Jeff Combs	6 ft 2 in (1.88 m)	160 lb (73 kg)	So	Middletown Fenwick	Franklin, OH
F	32	Dave Dinn	6 ft 6 in (1.98 m)	200 lb (91 kg)	So	Boone County	Florence, KY
F	23	Rob Geistwhite	6 ft 6 in (1.98 m)	190 lb (86 kg)	So	Woodlan	Grabill, IN
G	33	Matt Horstman	6 ft 5 in (1.96 m)	205 lb (93 kg)	So	Alter	Dayton, OH
G	34	Chris Wampler	6 ft 3 in (1.91 m)	170 lb (77 kg)	So	Tippecanoe	Tipp City, OH
F/C	44	Scott Benton	6 ft 9 in (2.06 m)	215 lb (98 kg)	Fr	Walton-Verona	Union, KY
G	35	Pat Drazga	6 ft 2 in (1.88 m)	175 lb (79 kg)	Fr	St. Clairsville	St. Clairsville, OH
G	25	Mike Thompson	6 ft 2 in (1.88 m)	175 lb (79 kg)	Fr	Minerva	Minerva, OH
F/C	42	Scott Wilder	6 ft 9 in (2.06 m)	225 lb (102 kg)	Fr	Woodlan	Woodburn, IN

Head coach

- Ralph Underhill

Assistant coach(es)

Jim Brown, Bob Grote, Jeff Dillon, Lenny Lyons

Legend

- (C) Team captain
- (S) Suspended
- (I) Ineligible
- (W) Walk-on
- Injured
- Current redshirt

== Schedule and results ==
Date time, TV	Rank^{#}	Opponent^{#}	Result	Record	Site city, state
Regular season
Nov 28, 1987		at U.S. International	W 110-97	1-0	Golden Hall; San Diego, CA
Dec 5, 1987		Pace	W 71-70	2–0	WSU PE Building; Fairborn, OH
Dec 7, 1987		at Green Bay	L 65-87	2-1	Brown County Veterans Memorial Arena; Green Bay, WI
Dec 9, 1987		at Western Illinois	L 67-89	2–2	Western Hall; Macomb, IL
Dec 12, 1987		at Bowling Green	L 65-66	2–3	Anderson Arena; Bowling Green, OH
Dec 18, 1987		Delaware State; Wright State Invitational	W 99-96	3–3	WSU PE Building; Fairborn, OH
Dec 19, 1987		Northeast Louisiana; Wright State Invitational	W 74-68	4–3	WSU PE Building; Fairborn, OH
Dec 22, 1987		Central Michigan	L 68-97	4–4	WSU PE Building; Fairborn, OH
Jan 2, 1988		Bethune-Cookman	W 98-76	5–4	WSU PE Building; Fairborn, OH
Jan 6, 1988		at Brooklyn	W 80-56	6–4	Roosevelt Gymnasium; Brooklyn, New York
Jan 13, 1988		Chicago State	W 80-75	7–4	WSU PE Building; Fairborn, OH
Jan 16, 1988		Maryland Eastern Shore	W 103-73	8–4	WSU PE Building; Fairborn, OH
Jan 18, 1988		Howard	W 88-69	9–4	WSU PE Building; Fairborn, OH
Jan 20, 1988		at Youngstown State	W 93-63	10-4	Beeghly Center; Youngstown, OH
Jan 23, 1988		Brooklyn	W 87-70	11-4	WSU PE Building; Fairborn, OH
Jan 28, 1988		at Maryland Eastern Shore	L 73-77	11-5	J. Millard Tawes Gymnasium; Princess Anne, MD
Jan 30, 1988		at Maryland-Baltimore County	L 79-81	11-6	UMBC Fieldhouse; Baltimore, MD
Feb 3, 1988		at Xavier	L 84-101	11-7	Cincinnati Gardens; Cincinnati, OH
Feb 6, 1988		U.S. International	W 97-89	12-7	WSU PE Building; Fairborn, OH
Feb 10, 1988		Akron	L 81-88	12–8	WSU PE Building; Fairborn, OH
Feb 13, 1988		at Chicago State	L 83-90	12–9	Physical Education and Athletic Building; Chicago, IL
Feb 15, 1988		Central Connecticut	W 86-82	13–9	WSU PE Building; Fairborn, OH
Feb 17, 1978		at Akron	L 82-89 ^{OT}	13-10	JAR Arena; Akron, OH
Feb 21, 1988		vs. Central State	W 82-57	14-10	UD Arena; Dayton, OH
Feb 24, 1988		at Central Connecticut	W 90-87	15-10	Kaiser Hall; New Britain, CT
Feb 27, 1988		Maryland-Baltimore County	W 90-87	16-10	WSU PE Building; Fairborn, OH
Mar 5, 1988		at Dayton; Gem City Jam	L 71-89	16-11	UD Arena; Dayton, Ohio
*Non-conference game. ^{#}Rankings from AP Poll. (#) Tournament seedings in parentheses. MW=Midwest.

== Awards and honors ==
Joe Jackson	MVP
Rondey Robinson	Raider Award

== Statistics ==
Number	Name	Games	Average	Points	Assists	Rebounds
22	Joe Jackson	27	15.9	429	90	142
42	Rondney Robinson	25	15.4	384	16	163
32	Dave Dinn	27	12.0	328	39	164
33	Matt Horstman	26	10.6	275	23	40
35	Corey Brown	27	8.4	227	163	60
44	Scott Benton	22	6.4	140	20	62
40	James Jones	24	6.0	141	15	114
23	Rob Geistwhite	23	5.5	120	34	35
34	Chris Wampler	27	4.9	133	28	36
52	Scott Wilder	21	1.9	39	2	25
43	Mike Thompson	12	1.1	12	4	1
25	Pat Drazga	12	1.0	12	2	9
30	Jeff Combs	10	0.6	6	0	1
