= 1988 SWAC men's basketball tournament =

Basketball Tournament March 1988 in Louisiana

- Classification: Division I
- Season: 1987–88
- Teams: 8
- Site: F. G. Clark Activity Center; Baton Rouge, Louisiana
- Champions: Southern (4th title)
- Winning coach: Ben Jobe (2nd title)
- MVP: Avery Johnson (Southern)

1987–88 SWAC men's basketball standings
	Conf.				Overall
Team	W		L	PCT	W		L	PCT
Southern †	12	–	2	.857	24	–	7	.774
Texas Southern	11	–	3	.786	21	–	8	.724
Grambling State	9	–	5	.643	13	–	17	.433
Jackson State	7	–	7	.500	13	–	15	.464
Mississippi Valley State	5	–	9	.357	8	–	20	.286
Alcorn State	5	–	9	.357	8	–	21	.276
Alabama State	4	–	10	.286	8	–	20	.286
Prairie View A&M	3	–	11	.214	5	–	22	.185
† 1988 SWAC tournament winner Rankings from AP Poll

The 1988 SWAC men's basketball tournament was held March 10–12, 1988, at the F. G. Clark Activity Center in Baton Rouge, Louisiana. Southern defeated Grambling State, 78–62 in the championship game to capture their second straight SWAC Tournament title. The Jaguars received the conference's automatic bid to the 1988 NCAA tournament as No. 15 seed in the Southeast Region.

== Bracket and results ==
Quarterfinals; March 10
1	Southern	108
8	Prairie View A&M	70
4	Jackson State	63
5	Alcorn State	79
3	Grambling State	87
6	Mississippi Valley State	62
2	Texas Southern	105
7	Alabama State	93

Semifinals; March 11
1	Southern	87
5	Alcorn State	73
3	Grambling State	81
2	Texas Southern	75

Final; March 12
1	Southern	78
3	Grambling State	62
