= 1987–88 DePaul Blue Demons men's basketball team =

American college basketball season

1987–88 DePaul Blue Demons men's basketball
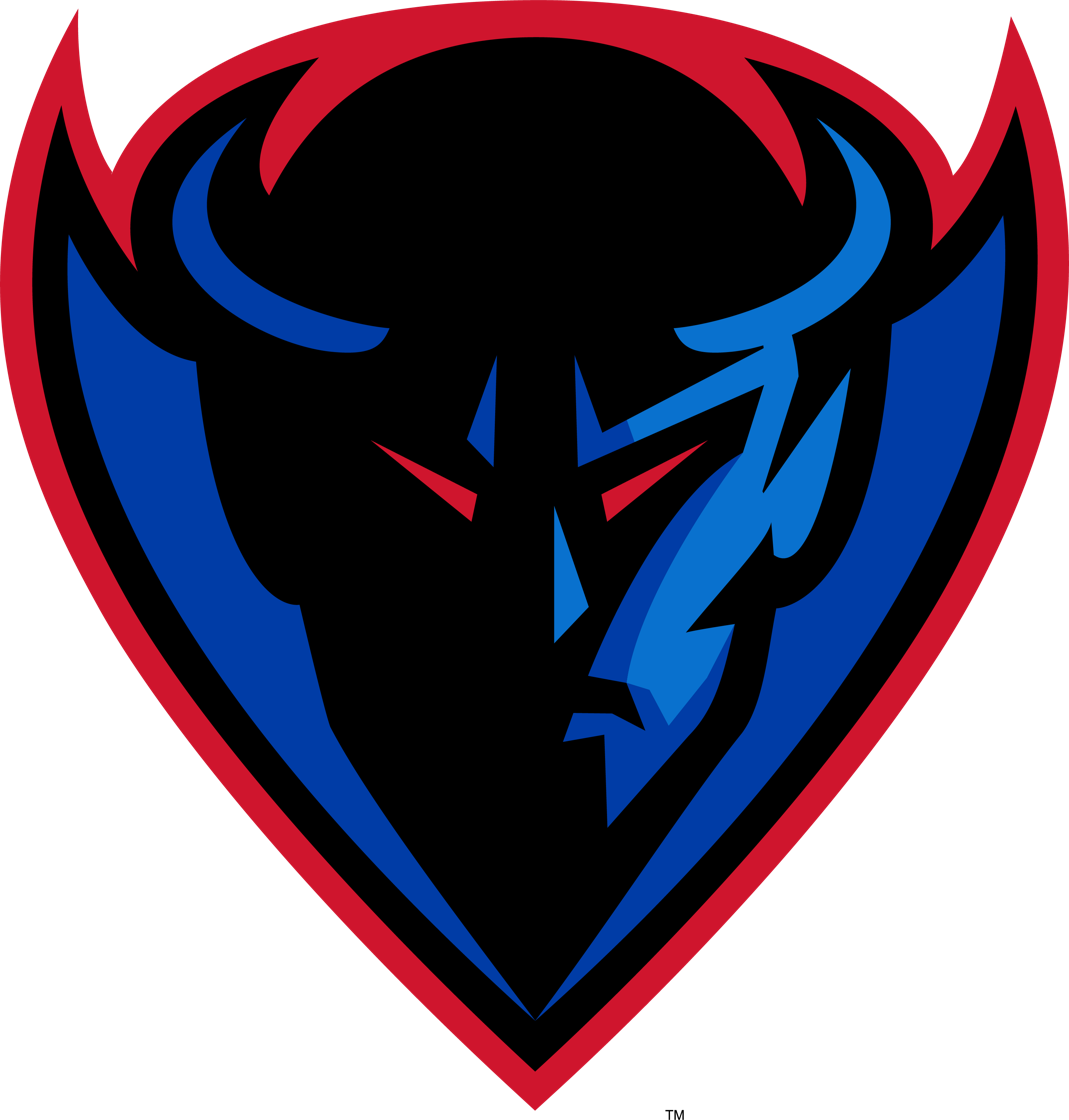

NCAA tournament, Second Round
- Conference: Independent

Ranking
- Coaches: No. 18
- Record: 22–8
- Head coach: Joey Meyer (4th season)
- Assistant coaches: Jim Molinari (9th season); Jim Platt (4th season); Dwayne Tyus; Jay Goedert
- Home arena: Rosemont Horizon

1987–88 NCAA Division I men's basketball independents standings
	Conf.				Overall
Team	W		L	PCT	W		L	PCT
Akron		–		–	21	–	7	.750
DePaul		–		–	22	–	8	.733
Notre Dame		–		–	20	–	9	.690
Wright State		–		–	16	–	11	.593
Miami (FL)		–		–	17	–	14	.548
UMBC		–		–	13	–	15	.464
Dayton		–		–	13	–	18	.419
Brooklyn		–		–	11	–	17	.393
Central Connecticut State		–		–	10	–	18	.357
Marquette		–		–	10	–	18	.357
Nicholls State		–		–	10	–	18	.357
U.S. International		–		–	10	–	18	.357
UMKC		–		–	9	–	18	.333
Central Florida		–		–	9	–	19	.321
Florida International		–		–	9	–	19	.321
Chicago State		–		–	8	–	20	.286
Northern Illinois		–		–	8	–	20	.286
Oral Roberts		–		–	8	–	21	.276
Southeastern Louisiana		–		–	7	–	21	.250
Rankings from AP Poll

The 1987–88 DePaul Blue Demons men's basketball team represented DePaul University during the 1987–88 NCAA Division I men's basketball season. They were led by head coach Joey Meyer, in his 4th season at the school, and played their home games at the Rosemont Horizon in Rosemont.

DePaul went 21–7 in the regular season and received a bid to the 1988 NCAA Tournament as the No. 5 seed in the Midwest region. DePaul beat Wichita State in the opening round and were beaten by Kansas State, 66–58, and finished the season 22–8.

== Roster ==
1987–88 DePaul Blue Demons men's basketball team
Players
Coaches

Pos.	#	Name	Height	Weight	Year	Previous school	Hometown
G	10	Rod Strickland	6 ft 3 in (1.91 m)	175 lb (79 kg)	Jr	Oak Hill Academy	Bronx, NY
G/F	13	Terence Greene	6 ft 4 in (1.93 m)	210 lb (95 kg)	Jr	Flint Central	Flint, MI
G	14	Andy Laux	6 ft 5 in (1.96 m)	195 lb (88 kg)	Sr	Immaculate Conception	Elmhurst, IL
F	15	Kevin Holland	6 ft 7 in (2.01 m)	210 lb (95 kg)	So	Cerritos	Cerritos, CA
G	20	Kevin Edwards	6 ft 3 in (1.91 m)	190 lb (86 kg)	Sr	Lakeland CC	Cleveland, OH
G	22	Brad Niemann	6 ft 3 in (1.91 m)	175 lb (79 kg)	Fr	Glenbrook South	Glenview, IL
F	23	Stanley Brundy	6 ft 6 in (1.98 m)	205 lb (93 kg)	Jr	Crenshaw	Los Angeles, CA
F	25	Chris Henderson	6 ft 6 in (1.98 m)	220 lb (100 kg)	So	Leo	Chicago, IL
F/C	31	Bill Heppner	6 ft 8 in (2.03 m)	215 lb (98 kg)	Fr	Crystal Lake Central	Crystal Lake, IL
F/C	34	Charles Sowell	6 ft 10 in (2.08 m)	230 lb (104 kg)	So	E. E. Smith	Fayetteville, NC
C	44	James Hamby	7 ft 1 in (2.16 m)	225 lb (102 kg)	So	Elgin	Elgin, IL
F/C	50	Curtis Jackson	6 ft 10 in (2.08 m)	230 lb (104 kg)	So	Brockton	Brockton, MA
F	55	Kevin Golden	6 ft 9 in (2.06 m)	205 lb (93 kg)	Sr	Lumen Christi	Jackson, MI

Head coach

- Joey Meyer

Assistant coach(es)

- Jim Molinari (Illinois Wesleyan)
- Jim Platt (Concordia (IL))
- Dwayne Tyus
- Jay Goedert

Legend

- (C) Team captain
- (S) Suspended
- (I) Ineligible
- (W) Walk-on
- Injured
- Current redshirt

Roster

== Schedule and results ==
Date time, TV	Rank^{#}	Opponent^{#}	Result	Record	Site city, state
Regular Season
Nov 28, 1987*	No. 20	Pepperdine	L 76–84	0–1	Rosemont Horizon (11,227); Rosemont, Illinois
Dec 1, 1987*		Niagara	W 88–87	1–1	Rosemont Horizon (9,459); Rosemont, Illinois
Dec 5, 1987*		Illinois State	W 76–55	2–1	Rosemont Horizon (12,428); Rosemont, Illinois
Dec 9, 1987*		Western Michigan	W 94–64	3–1	Rosemont Horizon (9,599); Rosemont, Illinois
Dec 12, 1987*		No. 19 Notre Dame	W 73–69	4–1	Rosemont Horizon (16,118); Rosemont, Illinois
Dec 16, 1987*		at Weber State	W 88–65	5–1	Dee Events Center (6,184); Ogden, Utah
Dec 18, 1987*		at Washington	W 89–73	6–1	Hec Edmundson Pavilion (4,566); Seattle, Washington
Dec 21, 1987*		at Northwestern	L 64–78	6–2	Welsh-Ryan Arena (7,303); Evanston, Illinois
Dec 23, 1987*		UTSA	W 93–82	7–2	Rosemont Horizon (10,140); Rosemont, Illinois
Jan 2, 1988*		at Hartford	W 68–61	8–2	Hartford Civic Center (6,465); Hartford, Connecticut
Jan 9, 1988*		No. 14 Georgetown	L 64–74	8–3	Rosemont Horizon (15,503); Rosemont, Illinois
Jan 14, 1988*		Dayton	L 72–79	8–4	Rosemont Horizon (10,935); Rosemont, Illinois
Jan 16, 1988*		at Notre Dame	W 77–71	9–4	Joyce Center (11,418); South Bend, Indiana
Jan 21, 1988*		Loyola–Chicago	W 93–77	10–4	Rosemont Horizon (11,236); Rosemont, Illinois
Jan 23, 1988*		at Old Dominion	W 95–88	11–4	Norfolk Scope (10,227); Norfolk, Virginia
Jan 27, 1988*		Marquette	W 81–66	12–4	Rosemont Horizon (11,915); Rosemont, Illinois
Jan 31, 1988*		at NC State	L 66–71	12–5	Reynolds Coliseum (10,200); Raleigh, North Carolina
Feb 3, 1988*		at Indiana State	W 64–56	13–5	Hulman Center (5,100); Terre Haute, Indiana
Feb 6, 1988*		at Georgia Tech	L 70–71	13–6	Alexander Memorial Coliseum (8,112); Atlanta, Georgia
Feb 10, 1988*		No. 15 Bradley	W 86–80	14–6	Rosemont Horizon (15,610); Rosemont, Illinois
Feb 13, 1988*		Evansville	L 63–65	14–7	Rosemont Horizon (13,140); Rosemont, Illinois
Feb 16, 1988*		Iona	W 92–56	15–7	Rosemont Horizon (9,676); Rosemont, Illinois
Feb 20, 1988*		at St. John's	W 65–51	16–7	Madison Square Garden (14,508); New York, New York
Feb 24, 1988*		Jackson State	W 81–69	17–7	Rosemont Horizon (11,596); Rosemont, Illinois
Feb 27, 1988*		at Miami (FL)	W 101–82	18–7	Knight Center Complex (3,052); Miami, Florida
Mar 1, 1988*		at Dayton	W 92–77	19–7	University of Dayton Arena (11,740); Dayton, Ohio
Mar 5, 1988*		Louisville	W 77–58	20–7	Rosemont Horizon (17,365); Rosemont, Illinois
Mar 12, 1988*		at Marquette	W 77–65	21–7	MECCA Arena (11,052); Milwaukee, Wisconsin
NCAA tournament
Mar 17, 1988*	(5 MW)	vs. (12 MW) Wichita State; First round	W 83–62	22–7	Joyce Center (10,760); South Bend, Indiana
Mar 19, 1988*	(5 MW)	vs. (4 MW) No. 20 Kansas State; Second round	L 58–66	22–8	Joyce Center (10,760); South Bend, Indiana
*Non-conference game. ^{#}Rankings from AP Poll. (#) Tournament seedings in parentheses. MW=Midwest.

== Team players drafted into the NBA ==
Round	Pick	Player	NBA Club
1	19	Rod Strickland	New York Knicks
1	20	Kevin Edwards	Miami Heat
