= 1987–88 LSU Tigers basketball team =

American college basketball season

1987–88 LSU Tigers basketball

NCAA tournament
- Conference: Southeastern Conference
- West Division
- Record: 16–14 (10–8 SEC)
- Head coach: Dale Brown (16th season)
- Assistant coaches: Ron Abernathy (12th season); Bo Bahnsen; Johnny Jones (4th season)
- Home arena: LSU Assembly Center

1987–88 Southeastern Conference men's basketball standings
	Conf.				Overall
Team	W		L	PCT	W		L	PCT
No. 6 Kentucky †	13	–	5	.722	27	–	6	.818
Auburn	11	–	7	.611	19	–	11	.633
Florida	11	–	7	.611	23	–	12	.657
LSU	10	–	8	.556	16	–	14	.533
Vanderbilt	10	–	8	.556	20	–	11	.645
Tennessee	9	–	9	.500	16	–	13	.552
Georgia	8	–	10	.444	20	–	16	.556
Ole Miss	6	–	12	.333	13	–	16	.448
Alabama	6	–	12	.333	14	–	17	.452
Mississippi State	6	–	12	.333	14	–	15	.483
† 1988 SEC tournament winner Rankings from AP Poll

The 1987-88 LSU Tigers men's basketball team represented Louisiana State University during the 1987–88 NCAA men's college basketball season. The head coach was Dale Brown. The team was a member of the Southeastern Conference and played their home games at LSU Assembly Center.

The Tigers finished in a fourth-place tie in the SEC regular season standings, and lost to Kentucky in the semifinals of the SEC Tournament. LSU received an at-large bid to the NCAA tournament as No. 9 seed in the East region where they lost in the opening round to Georgetown. The team finished with a 16–14 record (10–8 SEC).

== Roster ==
1987–88 LSU Tigers men's basketball team
Players
Coaches

Pos.	#	Name	Height	Weight	Year	Previous school	Hometown
F	33	Ricky Blanton	6 ft 7 in (2.01 m)	215 lb (98 kg)	Jr	Miami Killian	Miami, FL
C	43	José Vargas	6 ft 9 in (2.06 m)	225 lb (102 kg)	Sr	Evangelico Central	La Romana, Dominican Republic
		Hernán Montenegro (injured)	6 ft 9 in (2.06 m)	—

Head coach

- Dale Brown (Minot State)

Assistant coach(es)

- Ron Abernathy (Morehead State)
- Craig Carse
- Johnny Jones (LSU)

Legend

- (C) Team captain
- (S) Suspended
- (I) Ineligible
- (W) Walk-on
- Injured
- Current redshirt

Roster

== Schedule and results ==
Date time, TV	Rank^{#}	Opponent^{#}	Result	Record	Site city, state
Exhibition
Non-conference regular season
Dec 4, 1987*		Nicholls State	W 86–62	1–0	LSU Assembly Center; Baton Rouge, Louisiana
Dec 5, 1987*		Southern	W 98–77	2–0	LSU Assembly Center; Baton Rouge, Louisiana
Dec 12, 1987*		Maryland	W 55–54	3–0	LSU Assembly Center; Baton Rouge, Louisiana
Dec 16, 1987*		at Georgia Tech	L 70–87	3–1	Alexander Memorial Coliseum; Atlanta, Georgia
Dec 19, 1987*		at Arkansas State	L 52–66	3–2	Convocation Center; Jonesboro, Arkansas
Dec 22, 1987*		Texas State	W 93–74	4–2	LSU Assembly Center; Baton Rouge, Louisiana
Dec 28, 1987*		vs. Northern Iowa; UNLV Holiday Classic	L 80–90	4–3	Thomas & Mack Center; Las Vegas, Nevada
Dec 29, 1987*		at No. 15 Nevada-Las Vegas; UNLV Holiday Classic	L 59–78	4–4	Thomas & Mack Center; Las Vegas, Nevada
SEC regular season
Jan 6, 1988		at Vanderbilt	W 51–39	5–4 (1–0)	Memorial Gymnasium; Nashville, Tennessee
Jan 9, 1988		at Ole Miss	W 69–61	6–4 (2–0)	Tad Smith Coliseum; Oxford, Mississippi
Jan 11, 1988*; 8:00 pm, USA		vs. No. 3 Oklahoma	W 84–77	7–4	Lakefront Arena; New Orleans, Louisiana
Jan 13, 1988		at Tennessee	W 52–51	8–4 (3–0)	Thompson-Boling Arena; Knoxville, Tennessee
Jan 16, 1988		at Georgia	W 52–51	8–5 (3–1)	Stegeman Coliseum; Athens, Georgia
Jan 20, 1988		Alabama	W 67–52	9–5 (4–1)	LSU Assembly Center; Baton Rouge, Louisiana
Jan 23, 1988		No. 4 Kentucky	L 61–76	9–6 (4–2)	LSU Assembly Center; Baton Rouge, Louisiana
Jan 27, 1988; JPT		at No. 14 Florida	L 50–61	9–7 (4–3)	O'Connell Center; Gainesville, Florida
Jan 30, 1988		Mississippi State	L 47–49	9–8 (4–4)	LSU Assembly Center; Baton Rouge, Louisiana
Feb 3, 1988		at Auburn	W 78–69	10–8 (5–4)	Beard-Eaves Memorial Coliseum; Auburn, Alabama
Feb 6, 1988		No. 15 Vanderbilt	W 94–79	11–8 (6–4)	LSU Assembly Center; Baton Rouge, Louisiana
Feb 10, 1988		Ole Miss	W 78–57	12–8 (7–4)	LSU Assembly Center; Baton Rouge, Louisiana
Feb 13, 1988		Tennessee	W 92–62	13–8 (8–4)	LSU Assembly Center; Baton Rouge, Louisiana
Feb 17, 1988		Georgia	W 63–62	14–8 (9–4)	LSU Assembly Center; Baton Rouge, Louisiana
Feb 20, 1988		at Alabama	L 59–72	14–9 (9–5)	Coleman Coliseum; Tuscaloosa, Alabama
Feb 24, 1988		at No. 12 Kentucky	L 69–95	14–10 (9–6)	Rupp Arena; Lexington, Kentucky
Mar 2, 1988		at Mississippi State	L 60–62	14–11 (9–7)	Humphrey Coliseum; Starkville, Mississippi
Mar 5, 1988		Auburn	L 80–89	14–12 (9–8)	LSU Assembly Center; Baton Rouge, Louisiana
Mar 6, 1988		Florida	W 86–69	15–12 (10–8)	LSU Assembly Center; Baton Rouge, Louisiana
SEC tournament
Mar 11, 1988*; JPT		Vanderbilt; Quarterfinals	W 87–80	16–12	LSU Assembly Center; Baton Rouge, Louisiana
Mar 12, 1988*; 12:00 p.m., JPT	(4)	(1) No. 6 Kentucky; Semifinals	L 80–86	16–13	LSU Assembly Center; Baton Rouge, Louisiana
NCAA tournament
Mar 18, 1988*	(9 E)	vs. (8 E) Georgetown; First round	L 63–66	16–14	Hartford Civic Center (15,068); Hartford, Connecticut
*Non-conference game. ^{#}Rankings from AP Poll. (#) Tournament seedings in parentheses. E=East.

== Team players drafted into the NBA ==
Round	Pick	Player	NBA club
2	49	José Vargas	Dallas Mavericks
3	57	Hernán Montenegro	Philadelphia 76ers
