= 1987–88 Virginia Cavaliers men's basketball team =

American college basketball season

1987–88 Virginia Cavaliers men's basketball
- Conference: Atlantic Coast Conference
- Record: 13–18 (5–9 ACC)
- Head coach: Terry Holland (14th season)
- Assistant coaches: Jeff Jones (6th season); Dave Odom (6th season)
- Home arena: University Hall

1987–88 ACC men's basketball standings
| | Conf. | | | | Overall |
| Team | W | | L | PCT | W | | L | PCT |
|---|---|---|---|---|---|---|---|---|
| No. 7 North Carolina | 11 | – | 3 | .786 | 27 | – | 7 | .794 |
| No. 14 NC State | 10 | – | 4 | .714 | 24 | – | 8 | .750 |
| No. 5 Duke † | 9 | – | 5 | .643 | 28 | – | 7 | .800 |
| Georgia Tech | 8 | – | 6 | .571 | 22 | – | 10 | .688 |
| Maryland | 6 | – | 8 | .429 | 18 | – | 13 | .581 |
| Virginia | 5 | – | 9 | .357 | 13 | – | 18 | .419 |
| Clemson | 4 | – | 10 | .286 | 14 | – | 15 | .483 |
| Wake Forest | 3 | – | 11 | .214 | 10 | – | 18 | .357 |
† 1988 ACC tournament winner Rankings from AP Poll

The 1987–88 Virginia Cavaliers men's basketball team represented the University of Virginia during the 1987–88 NCAA Division I men's basketball season. The team was led by fourteenth-year head coach Terry Holland, and played their home games at University Hall in Charlottesville, Virginia as members of the Atlantic Coast Conference.

== Roster ==
1987–88 Virginia Cavaliers men's basketball team
Players
Coaches

| Pos. | # | Name | Height | Weight | Year | Hometown |
|---|---|---|---|---|---|---|
| G/F | 4 | Rob Metcalf | 6 ft 5 in (1.96 m) | 207 lb (94 kg) | Fr | Port Edwards, Wisconsin |
| G | 5 | Ron Price | 5 ft 8 in (1.73 m) | 172 lb (78 kg) | So | Spencer, Virginia |
| G | 10 | John Johnson | 6 ft 0 in (1.83 m) | 178 lb (81 kg) | Sr | Brooklyn, New York |
| G | 11 | Richard Morgan | 6 ft 3 in (1.91 m) | 204 lb (93 kg) | Jr | Salem, Virginia |
| F | 12 | Kenny Turner | 6 ft 6 in (1.98 m) | 215 lb (98 kg) | Fr | Indianapolis, Indiana |
| G | 20 | Darrick Sims | 6 ft 2 in (1.88 m) | 198 lb (90 kg) | Sr | Alexandria, Virginia |
| F | 21 | Mel Kennedy | 6 ft 5 in (1.96 m) | 225 lb (102 kg) | Sr | Long Island, New York |
| G | 22 | John Crotty | 6 ft 1 in (1.85 m) | 174 lb (79 kg) | Fr | Orange, New Jersey |
| F | 24 | Dirk Katstra | 6 ft 5 in (1.96 m) | 201 lb (91 kg) | Fr | Stilwell, Kansas |
| F | 30 | Matt Blundin | 6 ft 6 in (1.98 m) | 217 lb (98 kg) | Fr | Ridley Township, Pennsylvania |
| F | 31 | Mark Cooke | 6 ft 4 in (1.93 m) | 206 lb (93 kg) | So | Martinsville, Virginia |
| F | 34 | Bill Batts | 6 ft 8 in (2.03 m) | 204 lb (93 kg) | Jr | South Euclid, Ohio |
| C | 42 | Brent Bair | 6 ft 10 in (2.08 m) | 219 lb (99 kg) | Jr | Ankeny, Iowa |
| F/C | 44 | Jeff Daniel | 6 ft 9 in (2.06 m) | 200 lb (91 kg) | So | Indianapolis, Indiana |
| G/F | 52 | John Dyslin | 6 ft 11 in (2.11 m) | 217 lb (98 kg) | Sr | Knoxville, Tennessee |
| C | 54 | Tim Martin | 6 ft 11 in (2.11 m) | 249 lb (113 kg) | Jr | Ridgeway, Virginia |

Head coach

- Terry Holland (Davidson)

Assistant coach(es)

- Craig Littlepage (Penn)
- Jeff Jones (Virginia)

Legend

- (C) Team captain
- (S) Suspended
- (I) Ineligible
- (W) Walk-on
- Injured
- Current redshirt

== Schedule and results ==
| Date time, TV | Rank^{#} | Opponent^{#} | Result | Record | Site (attendance) city, state |
Non-conference regular season
| Dec 6, 1987* | | at Connecticut | W 72–59 | 3–1 | Hartford Civic Center (10,087); Hartford, Connecticut |
| Dec 9, 1987* | | Dayton | W 69–50 | 4–1 | University Hall; Charlottesville, Virginia |
| Dec 12, 1987* | | at Arkansas | L 52–66 | 4–2 | Barnhill Arena; Fayetteville, Arkansas |
| Dec 23, 1987* | | vs. No. 12 Oklahoma; Chaminade Classic | L 61–109 | 4–5 | Neal S. Blaisdell Center; Honolulu, Hawaii |
| Dec 24, 1987* | | vs. Georgia; Chaminade Classic | W 87–54 | 5–5 | Neal S. Blaisdell Center; Honolulu, Hawaii |
| Dec 26, 1987* | | at Chaminade; Chaminade Classic | W 66–58 | 6–5 | Neal S. Blaisdell Center; Honolulu, Hawaii |
| Jan 2, 1987* | | at Villanova | L 53–63 | 6–6 | John Eleuthère du Pont Pavilion (6,500); Villanova, Pennsylvania |
| Jan 6, 1987* | | Radford | W 65–56 | 7–6 | University Hall; Charlottesville, Virginia |
ACC regular season
| Jan 9, 1988; 4:00 p.m. | | No. 9 Duke | L 59–77 | 7–7 (0–1) | University Hall (8,005); Charlottesville, Virginia |
| Jan 10, 1988 | | Clemson | W 77–75 | 8–7 (1–1) | University Hall; Charlottesville, Virginia |
| Jan 16, 1988 | | at No. 2 North Carolina | L 62–87 | 8–8 (1–2) | Dean Smith Center; Chapel Hill, North Carolina |
| Jan 20, 1988 | | Maryland | W 84–72 | 9–8 (2–2) | University Hall; Charlottesville, Virginia |
| Jan 23, 1988 | | Georgia Tech | W 58–55 | 10–8 (3–2) | University Hall; Charlottesville, Virginia |
| Feb 14, 1988 | | No. 6 North Carolina | L 58–64 | 12–12 (4–4) | University Hall; Charlottesville, Virginia |
| Feb 17, 1988; 7:30 p.m. | | at No. 6 Duke | L 54–73 | 12–13 (4–5) | Cameron Indoor Stadium (8,564); Durham, North Carolina |
| Feb 21, 1988 | | at Clemson | L 62–65 | 12–14 (4–6) | Littlejohn Coliseum; Clemson, South Carolina |
| Feb 25, 1988 | | at No. 20 Georgia Tech | L 71–76 | 12–15 (4–7) | Alexander Memorial Coliseum; Atlanta, Georgia |
| Feb 27, 1988 | | NC State | L 63–64 | 12–16 (4–8) | University Hall; Charlottesville, Virginia |
| Mar 2, 1988 | | at Wake Forest | W 69–67 | 13–16 (5–8) | Winston-Salem Memorial Coliseum; Winston-Salem, North Carolina |
| Mar 5, 1988 | | at Maryland | L 63–69 | 13–17 (5–9) | Cole Fieldhouse; College Park, Maryland |
ACC tournament
| Mar 11, 1988* | (6) | vs. (3) No. 8 Duke; Quarterfinals | L 48–60 | 13–18 | Greensboro Coliseum; Greensboro, North Carolina |
*Non-conference game. ^{#}Rankings from AP poll. (#) Tournament seedings in parentheses. All times are in Eastern time.
