= 1987–88 Alabama Crimson Tide men's basketball team =

American college basketball season

1987–88 Alabama Crimson Tide men's basketball
- Conference: Southeastern Conference
- Record: 14–17 (6–12 SEC)
- Head coach: Wimp Sanderson (8th season)
- Home arena: Coleman Coliseum

1987–88 Southeastern Conference men's basketball standings
	Conf.				Overall
Team	W		L	PCT	W		L	PCT
No. 6 Kentucky †	13	–	5	.722	27	–	6	.818
Auburn	11	–	7	.611	19	–	11	.633
Florida	11	–	7	.611	23	–	12	.657
LSU	10	–	8	.556	16	–	14	.533
Vanderbilt	10	–	8	.556	20	–	11	.645
Tennessee	9	–	9	.500	16	–	13	.552
Georgia	8	–	10	.444	20	–	16	.556
Ole Miss	6	–	12	.333	13	–	16	.448
Alabama	6	–	12	.333	14	–	17	.452
Mississippi State	6	–	12	.333	14	–	15	.483
† 1988 SEC tournament winner Rankings from AP Poll

The 1987–88 Alabama Crimson Tide men's basketball team represented the University of Alabama in the 1987–88 NCAA Division I men's basketball season. The team's head coach was Wimp Sanderson, who was in his eighth season at Alabama. The team played their home games at Coleman Coliseum in Tuscaloosa, Alabama. They finished the season with a record of 14–17, 6–12 in conference, finishing in a tie for eighth place. It was the Tide's first non-winning season since the 1971–72 season.

The Tide suffered heavy losses in the 1987 offseason. Forward Derrick McKey declared early for the NBA draft after his junior season. Forward Jim Farmer graduated and was also drafted into the NBA. Also, guards James Jackson, Terry Coner, and Mark Gottfried all graduated. The Tide signed freshman forward Melvin Cheatum and freshman guards Gary Waites and Bryant Lancaster to try to offset the losses. Also, junior college transfer Alvin Lee, who the previous season led the NJCAA in scoring, was also signed.

The Tide lost in the first round of the SEC tournament to Ole Miss. The team failed to make the NCAA tournament for the first time since 1982 and failed to reach any postseason play for the first time since 1978.

== Roster ==
1987–88 Alabama Crimson Tide men's basketball team
Players
Coaches

Pos.	#	Name	Height	Weight	Year	Previous school	Hometown
F	45	Michael Ansley	6 ft 7 in (2.01 m)	—	Jr	Jackson-Olin High School	Birmingham, Alabama
G	12	Melvin Cheatum	6 ft 6 in (1.98 m)	—	Fr
G		Alvin Lee	6 ft 3 in (1.91 m)	—	Jr
G		Gary Waites	6 ft 2 in (1.88 m)	—	Fr
G	24	Craig Dudley	6 ft 4 in (1.93 m)	—	Sr
G		Bryant Lancaster	6 ft 3 in (1.91 m)	—	Fr
F		Keith Askins	6 ft 6 in (1.98 m)	—	So	Athens High School	Athens, Alabama
	52	William DeVaughn	6 ft 9 in (2.06 m)	—	Jr

Head coach

- Wimp Sanderson

Assistant coach(es)

Legend

- (C) Team captain
- (S) Suspended
- (I) Ineligible
- (W) Walk-on
- Injured
- Current redshirt

== Schedule and results ==
Date time, TV	Rank^{#}	Opponent^{#}	Result	Record	Site city, state
Regular Season
November 27, 1987*		New Mexico State	W 85–84	1–0	Honolulu, Hawaii
November 28, 1987*		at Hawaii Pacific	W 91–80	2–0	Honolulu, Hawaii
November 29, 1987*		Central Michigan	W 83–80	3–0	Honolulu, Hawaii
December 5, 1987*		USC	W 78–69	4–0	
December 9, 1987*		at South Carolina	L 67–73	4–1	Carolina Coliseum; Columbia, South Carolina
December 12, 1987*		Louisiana-Monroe	W 86–66	5–1	Memorial Coliseum; Tuscaloosa, Alabama
December 19, 1987*		Montana State	L 69–77	5–2	Memorial Coliseum; Tuscaloosa, Alabama
December 21, 1987*		Mississippi Valley State	W 64–46	6–2	Memorial Coliseum; Tuscaloosa, Alabama
December 23, 1987*		Arkansas	L 55–80	6–3	Barton Coliseum; Little Rock, Arkansas
December 28, 1987		at UCF	W 65–54	7–3	Orange County Civic Center; Orlando, Florida
December 29, 1987*		No. 3 Pittsburgh	L 51–87	7–4	Orange County Civic Center; Orlando, Florida
January 2, 1988*		Charleston Southern	W 55–41	8–4	Memorial Coliseum; Tuscaloosa, Alabama
January 6, 1988		Georgia	L 57–59	8–5 (0–1)	Memorial Coliseum; Tuscaloosa, Alabama
January 9, 1988		at Mississippi State	L 56–59	8–6 (0–2)	Humphrey Coliseum; Starkville, Mississippi
January 13, 1988		No. 5 Kentucky	L 55–63	8–7 (0–3)	Memorial Coliseum; Tuscaloosa, Alabama
January 16, 1988		at Vanderbilt	L 60–76	8–8 (0–4)	Memorial Gymnasium; Nashville, Tennessee
January 20, 1988		at LSU	L 52–67	8–9 (0–5)	Maravich Assembly Center; Baton Rouge, Louisiana
January 23, 1988		Ole Miss	W 73–66	9–9 (1–5)	Memorial Coliseum; Tuscaloosa, Alabama
January 27, 1988		at Auburn	L 74–84	9–10 (1–6)	Memorial Coliseum; Auburn, Alabama
January 30, 1988		Tennessee	W 82–69	10–10 (2–6)	Memorial Coliseum; Tuscaloosa, Alabama
February 3, 1988		No. 19 Florida	L 64–74	10–11 (2–7)	Memorial Coliseum; Tuscaloosa, Alabama
February 6, 1988		at Georgia	L 54–67	10–12 (2–8)	Stegeman Coliseum; Athens, Georgia
February 10, 1988		Mississippi State	W 61–48	11–12 (3–8)	Memorial Coliseum; Tuscaloosa, Alabama
February 13, 1988		at No. 10 Kentucky	L 68–82	11–13 (3–9)	Rupp Arena; Lexington, Kentucky
February 17, 1988		No. 16 Vanderbilt	W 88–77	12–13 (4–9)	Memorial Coliseum; Tuscaloosa, Alabama
February 20, 1988		LSU	W 72–59	13–13 (5–9)	Memorial Coliseum; Tuscaloosa, Alabama
February 24, 1988		at Ole Miss	L 47–64	13–14 (5–10)	Tad Smith Coliseum; Oxford, Mississippi
February 27, 1988		Auburn	W 82–77	14–14 (6–10)	Memorial Coliseum; Tuscaloosa, Alabama
March 2, 1988		at Tennessee	L 58–81	14–15 (6–11)	Thompson-Boling Arena; Knoxville, Tennessee
March 5, 1988		at Florida	L 45–52	14–16 (6–12)	O'Connell Center; Gainesville, Florida
SEC Tournament
March 7, 1985	(9)	(8) Ole Miss; First Round	L 59–64 ^{OT}	14–17	Maravich Assembly Center; Baton Rouge, Louisiana
*Non-conference game. ^{#}Rankings from AP poll. (#) Tournament seedings in parentheses. SE=Southeast.
