= 1987–88 North Carolina Tar Heels men's basketball team =

American college basketball season

1987–88 North Carolina Tar Heels men's basketball

ACC regular season champions

NCAA tournament, Elite Eight
- Conference: Atlantic Coast Conference

Ranking
- Coaches: No. 7
- AP: No. 7
- Record: 27–7 (11–3 ACC)
- Head coach: Dean Smith (27th season)
- Assistant coaches: Bill Guthridge (21st season); Roy Williams (10th season); Dick Harp (2nd season)
- Home arena: Dean Smith Center

1987–88 ACC men's basketball standings
	Conf.				Overall
Team	W		L	PCT	W		L	PCT
No. 7 North Carolina	11	–	3	.786	27	–	7	.794
No. 14 NC State	10	–	4	.714	24	–	8	.750
No. 5 Duke †	9	–	5	.643	28	–	7	.800
Georgia Tech	8	–	6	.571	22	–	10	.688
Maryland	6	–	8	.429	18	–	13	.581
Virginia	5	–	9	.357	13	–	18	.419
Clemson	4	–	10	.286	14	–	15	.483
Wake Forest	3	–	11	.214	10	–	18	.357
† 1988 ACC tournament winner Rankings from AP Poll

The 1987–88 North Carolina Tar Heels men's basketball team represented the University of North Carolina at Chapel Hill.

Led by head coach Dean Smith, the Tar Heels won the ACC regular season title, reached the Elite Eight of the NCAA tournament, and achieved a top-ten final ranking in the AP poll. After the season, longtime assistant coach Roy Williams would depart to become head coach of that season's national championship winners, the Kansas Jayhawks. Williams would eventually leave Kansas in 2003 to become the head coach of the Tar Heels and win national titles in 2005, 2009, and 2017.

== Roster ==
1987–88 North Carolina Tar Heels men's basketball team
Players
Coaches

Pos.	#	Name	Height	Weight	Year	Hometown
G	3	Jeff Denny	6 ft 4 in (1.93 m)	—	GS	Rural Hall, North Carolina
G	11	Rodney Hyatt	5 ft 8 in (1.73 m)	—	So	Wadesboro, North Carolina
F	20	Steve Bucknall	6 ft 6 in (1.98 m)	215 lb (98 kg)	Jr	London, England
G	21	King Rice	6 ft 0 in (1.83 m)	—	Fr	Binghamton, New York
G/F	22	Kevin Madden	6 ft 6 in (1.98 m)	—	So	Staunton, Virginia
G	24	Doug Elstun	6 ft 3 in (1.91 m)	—	Fr	Overland Park, Kansas
F	31	David May	6 ft 7 in (2.01 m)	—	Jr	Greensboro, North Carolina
F	32	Pete Chilcutt	6 ft 9 in (2.06 m)	—	Fr	Eutaw, Alabama
G	33	Ranzino Smith	6 ft 1 in (1.85 m)	—	Sr	Chapel Hill, North Carolina
F	34	J. R. Reid	6 ft 9 in (2.06 m)	245 lb (111 kg)	So	Virginia Beach, Virginia
F	35	Joe Jenkins	6 ft 5 in (1.96 m)	—	Sr	Elizabeth City, North Carolina
C	42	Scott Williams	6 ft 11 in (2.11 m)	230 lb (104 kg)	So	Hacienda Heights, California
F	44	Rick Fox	6 ft 7 in (2.01 m)	225 lb (102 kg)	Fr	Nassau, Bahamas

Head coach

- Dean Smith (Kansas)

Assistant coach(es)

- Bill Guthridge (Kansas State)
- Roy Williams (North Carolina)

Legend

- (C) Team captain
- (S) Suspended
- (I) Ineligible
- (W) Walk-on
- Injured
- Current redshirt

== Schedule and results ==
Date time, TV	Rank^{#}	Opponent^{#}	Result	Record	Site city, state
Non-conference Regular Season
Nov 21, 1987*	No. 3	vs. No. 1 Syracuse; Hall of Fame Tip Off Classic	W 96–93	1–0	Springfield Civic Center; Springfield, Massachusetts
Nov 27, 1987*	No. 3	vs. USC	W 82–77	2–0	
Nov 28, 1987*	No. 3	at Richmond; Central Fidelity Holiday Classic	W 87–76	3–0	Robins Center; Richmond, Virginia
Dec 3, 1987*	No. 1	Stetson	W 86–74	4–0	Dean Smith Center; Chapel Hill, North Carolina
Dec 5, 1987*	No. 1	at Vanderbilt	L 76–78	4–1	Memorial Gymnasium; Nashville, Tennessee
Dec 12, 1987*	No. 5	SMU	W 90–74	5–1	Dean Smith Center; Chapel Hill, North Carolina
Dec 17, 1987*	No. 4	The Citadel	W 98–74	6–1	Dean Smith Center; Chapel Hill, North Carolina
Dec 19, 1987*	No. 4	at Illinois	W 85–74	7–1	Assembly Hall (16,712); Champaign, Illinois
Dec 30, 1987*	No. 4	at Nevada	W 115–91	8–1	Lawlor Events Center; Reno, Nevada
Jan 2, 1988*	No. 4	at UCLA	W 80–73	9–1	Pauley Pavilion (12,544); Los Angeles, California
Jan 6, 1988*	No. 4	vs. Fordham	W 76–67	10–1	Greensboro Coliseum; Greensboro, North Carolina
Jan 9, 1988*	No. 4	La Salle	W 96–82	11–1	Dean Smith Center; Chapel Hill, North Carolina
ACC Regular season
Jan 14, 1988	No. 2	at Maryland	W 71–65	12–1 (1–0)	Cole Fieldhouse; College Park, Maryland
Jan 16, 1988	No. 2	Virginia	W 87–62	13–1 (2–0)	Dean Smith Center; Chapel Hill, North Carolina
Jan 21, 1988; 8:00 p.m., ESPN	No. 2	No. 9 Duke; Rivalry	L 69–70	13–2 (2–1)	Dean Smith Center (21,444); Chapel Hill, North Carolina
Jan 24, 1988	No. 2	at No. 20 NC State	W 77–73	14–2 (3–1)	Reynolds Coliseum; Raleigh, North Carolina
Jan 28, 1988	No. 3	at Wake Forest	L 80–83	14–3 (4–1)	Winston-Salem Memorial Coliseum; Winston-Salem, North Carolina
Jan 30, 1988	No. 3	Georgia Tech	W 73–71	15–3 (5–1)	Dean Smith Center; Chapel Hill, North Carolina
Feb 4, 1988	No. 8	at Clemson	W 88–64	16–3 (6–1)	Littlejohn Coliseum; Clemson, South Carolina
Feb 11, 1988	No. 6	No. 16 NC State	W 75–73	17–3 (7–1)	Dean Smith Center; Chapel Hill, North Carolina
Feb 14, 1988	No. 6	at Virginia	W 64–58	18–3 (8–1)	University Hall; Charlottesville, Virginia
Feb 17, 1988	No. 5	Wake Forest	W 80–62	19–3 (9–1)	Dean Smith Center; Chapel Hill, North Carolina
Feb 20, 1988	No. 5	Maryland	W 74–73	20–3 (10–1)	Dean Smith Center; Chapel Hill, North Carolina
Non-conference Regular season
Feb 21, 1988*; NBC	No. 5	No. 1 Temple	L 66–83	20–4	Dean Smith Center (21,444); Chapel Hill, North Carolina
ACC Regular season
Feb 28, 1988	No. 9	Clemson	W 88–52	21–4 (10–2)	Dean Smith Center; Chapel Hill, North Carolina
Mar 2, 1988	No. 6	at No. 13 Georgia Tech	W 97–80	22–4 (11–2)	Alexander Memorial Coliseum; Atlanta, Georgia
Mar 6, 1988; 1:00 p.m., NBC	No. 6	at No. 9 Duke; Rivalry	L 81–96	22–5 (11–3)	Cameron Indoor Stadium (8,564); Durham, North Carolina
ACC Tournament
Mar 11, 1988*	No. 9	vs. Wake Forest; Quarterfinals	W 83–62	23–5	Greensboro Coliseum; Greensboro, North Carolina
Mar 12, 1988*	No. 9	Maryland; Semifinals	W 74–64	24–5	Greensboro Coliseum; Greensboro, North Carolina
Mar 13, 1988*	No. 9	vs. No. 8 Duke; Championship game	L 61–65	24–6	Greensboro Coliseum; Greensboro, North Carolina
1988 NCAA tournament
Mar 17, 1988*	(2 W) No. 7	vs. (15 W) North Texas State; First round	W 83–65	25–6	Jon M. Huntsman Center; Salt Lake City, Utah
Mar 19, 1988*	(2 W) No. 7	vs. (10 W) No. 15 Loyola Marymount; Second round	W 123–97	26–6	Jon M. Huntsman Center; Salt Lake City, Utah
Mar 25, 1988*	(2 W) No. 7	vs. (3 W) No. 10 Michigan; West Regional semifinal – Sweet Sixteen	W 78–69	27–6	Kingdome; Seattle, Washington
Mar 27, 1988*	(2 W) No. 7	vs. (1 W) No. 2 Arizona; West Regional Final – Elite Eight	L 52–70	27–7	Kingdome; Seattle, Washington
*Non-conference game. ^{#}Rankings from AP Poll. (#) Tournament seedings in parentheses. W=West.
