= 1987–88 Maryland Terrapins men's basketball team =

American college basketball season

1987–88 Maryland Terrapins men's basketball

NCAA tournament, second round (vacated)
- Conference: Atlantic Coast Conference
- Record: 17-12 (18–13 unadjusted) (6–8 ACC)
- Head coach: Bob Wade (2nd season)
- Home arena: Cole Field House

1987–88 ACC men's basketball standings
	Conf.				Overall
Team	W		L	PCT	W		L	PCT
No. 7 North Carolina	11	–	3	.786	27	–	7	.794
No. 14 NC State	10	–	4	.714	24	–	8	.750
No. 5 Duke †	9	–	5	.643	28	–	7	.800
Georgia Tech	8	–	6	.571	22	–	10	.688
Maryland	6	–	8	.429	18	–	13	.581
Virginia	5	–	9	.357	13	–	18	.419
Clemson	4	–	10	.286	14	–	15	.483
Wake Forest	3	–	11	.214	10	–	18	.357
† 1988 ACC tournament winner Rankings from AP Poll

The 1987–88 Maryland Terrapins men's basketball team represented the University of Maryland, College Park as a member of the Atlantic Coast Conference during the 1987–88 NCAA Division I men's basketball season. The team was led by second-year head coach Bob Wade and played their home games at Cole Field House.

Maryland was later forced to vacate its appearance in the 1988 NCAA tournament due to usage of ineligible players.

== Roster ==
1987–88 Maryland Terrapins men's basketball team
Players
Coaches

Pos.	#	Name	Height	Weight	Year	Hometown
G	3	Keith Gatlin	6 ft 5 in (1.96 m)	165 lb (75 kg)	Sr	Grimesland, NC
G	12	Rudy Archer	6 ft 1 in (1.85 m)	—		Baltimore, MD
C	24	Brian Williams	6 ft 10 in (2.08 m)	240 lb (109 kg)	Fr	Fresno, CA
F/C	25	Tony Massenburg	6 ft 9 in (2.06 m)	240 lb (109 kg)	So	Sussex, VA
F	33	Derrick Lewis	6 ft 7 in (2.01 m)	195 lb (88 kg)	Sr	Temple Hills, MD
C	43	Cedric Lewis	6 ft 10 in (2.08 m)	225 lb (102 kg)	Fr	Washington, D.C.
G/F	44	Steve Hood	6 ft 7 in (2.01 m)	180 lb (82 kg)	Fr	Lynchburg, VA
F	50	Ed Woods	6 ft 7 in (2.01 m)	210 lb (95 kg)	Sr	Rockville, MD

Head coach

- Bob Wade

Assistant coach(es)

Legend

- (C) Team captain
- (S) Suspended
- (I) Ineligible
- (W) Walk-on
- Injured
- Current redshirt

== Schedule and results ==
Date time, TV	Rank^{#}	Opponent^{#}	Result	Record	Site city, state
Regular season
Nov 27, 1987*		at Loyola (MD); Harbor Classic	W 74–60	1–0	Reitz Arena; Baltimore, Maryland
Nov 28, 1987*		vs. Ole Miss; Harbor Classic	W 77–69	2–0	Reitz Arena; Baltimore, Maryland
Dec 3, 1987*		Winthrop	W 65–52	3–0	Cole Fieldhouse; College Park, Maryland
Dec 5, 1987*		at West Virginia	L 49–75	3–1	WVU Coliseum; Morgantown, West Virginia
Dec 8, 1987*		at Mount St. Mary's	W 82–54	4–1	WVU Coliseum; Morgantown, West Virginia
Dec 10, 1987*		East Carolina	W 75–59	5–1	Cole Fieldhouse; College Park, Maryland
Dec 12, 1987*		at LSU	L 54–55	5–2	Maravich Assembly Center; Baton Rouge, Louisiana
Dec 28, 1987*		South Carolina	W 82–77	6–2	Cole Fieldhouse; College Park, Maryland
Dec 30, 1987*		Arkansas	W 88–61	7–2	Cole Fieldhouse; College Park, Maryland
Jan 2, 1988		Wake Forest	W 93–76	8–2 (1–0)	Cole Fieldhouse; College Park, Maryland
Jan 6, 1988*		at Missouri	L 85–93	8–3	Hearnes Center; Columbia, Missouri
Jan 9, 1988		Clemson	W 68–53	9–3 (2–0)	Cole Fieldhouse; College Park, Maryland
Jan 14, 1988		No. 2 North Carolina	L 65–71	9–4 (2–1)	Cole Fieldhouse; College Park, Maryland
Jan 16, 1988		at No. 7 Duke	W 72–69	10–4 (3–1)	Cameron Indoor Stadium; Durham, North Carolina
Jan 20, 1988		at Virginia	L 72–84	10–5 (3–2)	University Hall; Charlottesville, Virginia
Jan 27, 1988		NC State	L 81–83	10–6 (3–3)	Cole Fieldhouse; College Park, Maryland
Feb 2, 1988*		at Notre Dame	W 78–75	11–6	Joyce Center; Notre Dame, Indiana
Feb 6, 1988*		at Old Dominion	W 70–65	12–6	Norfolk Scope; Norfolk, Virginia
Feb 8, 1988		Georgia Tech	L 83–96	12–7 (3–4)	Cole Fieldhouse; College Park, Maryland
Feb 10, 1988		at Clemson	W 70–66	13–7 (4–4)	Littlejohn Coliseum; Clemson, South Carolina
Feb 13, 1988		No. 8 Duke	L 83–90	13–8 (4–5)	Cole Fieldhouse; College Park, Maryland
Feb 16, 1988		at Georgia Tech	L 82–104	13–9 (4–6)	Alexander Memorial Coliseum; Atlanta, Georgia
Feb 20, 1988		at No. 5 North Carolina	L 73–74	13–10 (4–7)	Dean Smith Center; Chapel Hill, North Carolina
Feb 25, 1988*		Maryland Eastern Shore	W 101–51	14–10	Cole Fieldhouse; College Park, Maryland
Feb 27, 1988		at Wake Forest	W 70–65	15–10 (5–7)	Winston-Salem Memorial Coliseum; Winston-Salem, North Carolina
Mar 3, 1988		at No. 16 NC State	L 68–74	15–11 (5–8)	Reynolds Coliseum; Raleigh, North Carolina
Mar 5, 1988		Virginia	W 69–63	16–11 (6–8)	Cole Fieldhouse; College Park, Maryland
ACC Tournament
Mar 11, 1988*	(5)	vs. (4) No. 18 Georgia Tech; Quarterfinals	W 84–67	17–11	Greensboro Coliseum; Greensboro, North Carolina
Mar 12, 1988*	(5)	at (1) No. 9 North Carolina; Semifinals	L 64–74	17–12	Greensboro Coliseum; Greensboro, North Carolina
NCAA Tournament
Mar 18, 1988*	(7 SE)	vs. (10 SE) UC Santa Barbara; First round	W 92–82	18–12	Riverfront Coliseum; Cincinnati, Ohio
Mar 20, 1988*	(7 SE)	vs. (2 SE) No. 6 Kentucky; Second round	L 81–90	18–13	Riverfront Coliseum; Cincinnati, Ohio
*Non-conference game. ^{#}Rankings from AP Poll. (#) Tournament seedings in parentheses. SE=Southeast.

== Team players in the 1988 NBA draft ==
Round	Pick	Player	NBA club
3	62	Derrick Lewis	Chicago Bulls
