= 1987–88 UMKC Kangaroos men's basketball team =

American college basketball season

1987–88 UMKC Kangaroos men's basketball
- Conference: Independent
- Record: 9–18
- Head coach: Lee Hunt (1st season)
- Assistant coaches: Bill McCammon (1st season); Joe Proctor (1st season)
- Home arena: Municipal Auditorium

1987–88 NCAA Division I men's basketball independents standings
	Conf.				Overall
Team	W		L	PCT	W		L	PCT
Akron		–		–	21	–	7	.750
DePaul		–		–	22	–	8	.733
Notre Dame		–		–	20	–	9	.690
Wright State		–		–	16	–	11	.593
Miami (FL)		–		–	17	–	14	.548
UMBC		–		–	13	–	15	.464
Dayton		–		–	13	–	18	.419
Brooklyn		–		–	11	–	17	.393
Central Connecticut State		–		–	10	–	18	.357
Marquette		–		–	10	–	18	.357
Nicholls State		–		–	10	–	18	.357
U.S. International		–		–	10	–	18	.357
UMKC		–		–	9	–	18	.333
Central Florida		–		–	9	–	19	.321
Florida International		–		–	9	–	19	.321
Chicago State		–		–	8	–	20	.286
Northern Illinois		–		–	8	–	20	.286
Oral Roberts		–		–	8	–	21	.276
Southeastern Louisiana		–		–	7	–	21	.250
Rankings from AP Poll

The 1987–88 UMKC Kangaroos men's basketball team represented the University of Missouri–Kansas City during the 1987–88 NCAA Division I men's basketball season. The Kangaroos played their home games off-campus at Municipal Auditorium in Kansas City, Missouri as an independent (non-member of a conference) transitioning to full National Collegiate Athletic Association (NCAA) Division I status.

== Previous season ==
The Kangaroos did not compete during the 1986-87 season (they played the 1985–86 season as its last in the National Association of Intercollegiate Athletics (NAIA); they ended with a record of 19–15 and no postseason involvement).

During the autumn of 1986, the university hired Lee Hunt as both its athletic director and men's basketball head coach to oversee the transition from the NAIA to the NCAA.

== Roster ==
1987–88 UMKC Kangaroos men's basketball team
Players
Coaches

Pos.	#	Name	Height	Weight	Year	Previous school	Hometown
F	30	Jay Boster	6 ft 5 in (1.96 m)	185 lb (84 kg)	Jr	Independence (KS) CC; Bennington HS	Bennington, KS
C	52	Ron Davis	6 ft 9 in (2.06 m)	208 lb (94 kg)	Jr	Seward County CC; All Saints HS	Queens, NY
G	24	Devon Francis	6 ft 3 in (1.91 m)	175 lb (79 kg)	Jr	Alvin CC; James Madison HS	Houston, TX
G	11	Adrian Frazier (redshirt)	6 ft 3 in (1.91 m)	170 lb (77 kg)	Jr	Iowa Western CC; Waxahachie HS	Dallas, TX
G	25	Frank Molak	6 ft 0 in (1.83 m)	180 lb (82 kg)	Jr	Iowa Lakes CC; Kuemper Catholic HS	Arcadia, IA
F	21	Billy Newbill	6 ft 8 in (2.03 m)	200 lb (91 kg)	Jr	McLennan CC; Smith-Cotton HS	Sedalia, MO
F	44	Mark Oliver	6 ft 6 in (1.98 m)	220 lb (100 kg)	Jr	Southwestern (IA) CC; Lindblom Technical HS	Chicago, IL
F	42	Napoleon Petteway	6 ft 8 in (2.03 m)	205 lb (93 kg)	Jr	Ellsworth CC; Flint Northern HS	Flint, MI
F	22	Baxter Russell	6 ft 5 in (1.96 m)	204 lb (93 kg)	Jr	McLennan CC; Crockett HS	Austin, TX
G	32	Anthony Crompton	6 ft 4 in (1.93 m)	180 lb (82 kg)	Fr	Lincoln College Preparatory Academy	Kansas City, MO
C	45	David Robinson	6 ft 9 in (2.06 m)	230 lb (104 kg)	Fr	Joplin HS	Joplin, MO

Head coach

- Lee Hunt (Central Missouri State)

Assistant coach(es)

- Bill McCammon (Alabama-Birmingham)
- Joe Proctor (Memphis State)

Legend

- (C) Team captain
- (S) Suspended
- (I) Ineligible
- (W) Walk-on
- (5Y) Fifth-year Senior
- Injured
- Current redshirt

Roster
Last update: November 3, 2024

== Schedule & Results ==
Date time, TV	Rank^{#}	Opponent^{#}	Result	Record	High points	High rebounds	High assists	Site (attendance) city, state
Regular Season
November 30, 1987*; 7:05 PM		Rice	L 60–62	0–1	16 – Davis	8 – Davis	6 – Molak, Russell	Municipal Auditorium (4,256); Kansas City, MO
December 2, 1987*; 7:05 PM		at Kansas State	L 54–81	0–2	16 – Francis	6 – Crompton	5 – Molak	Ahearn Field House (10,400); Manhattan, KS
December 12, 1987*; 7:05 PM		Prairie View A&M	W 77–62	1–2	25 – Russell	15 – Davis	6 – Russell	Municipal Auditorium (3,294); Kansas City, MO
December 19, 1987*; 7:05 PM		Louisiana Tech	L 58–70	1–3	16 – Molak	6 – Russell	3 – Molak, Russell	Municipal Auditorium (2,859); Kansas City, MO
December 30, 1987*; 9:05 PM		at San Diego	L 60–69	1–4	13 – Boster	4 – Davis, Russell	2 – Francis	Sports Center (522); San Diego, CA
December 31, 1987*; 9:05 PM		at United States International	W 70–68	2–4	19 – Russell	12 – Francis	2 – Boster, Francis, Molak	Gymnasium (124); Chula Vista, CA
January 2, 1988*; 7:05 PM		vs. Tennessee–Chattanooga; UAB Classic [Semifinal]	L 55–64	2–5	13 – Oliver	6 – Davis	2 – Boster, Molak, Russell	Birmingham–Jefferson; Convention Complex Coliseum (6,129); Birmingham, AL
January 3, 1988*; 7:05 PM		vs. Jackson State; UAB Classic [Consolation Final]	L 55–59	2–6	14 – Davis	11 – Newbill	6 – Molak	Birmingham–Jefferson; Convention Complex Coliseum (4,368); Birmingham, AL
January 4, 1988*; 7:05 PM		Alcorn State	L 59–62	2–7	20 – Oliver	11 – Oliver	5 – Russell	Municipal Auditorium (1,554); Kansas City, MO
January 7, 1988*; 7:05 PM		Arkansas State	L 58–75	2–8	23 – Crompton	8 – Crompton	7 – Russell	Municipal Auditorium (1,612); Kansas City, MO
January 9, 1988*; 7:05 PM		Texas–Pan American	L 58–59	2–9	16 – Oliver	7 – Davis, Oliver	4 – Russell	Municipal Auditorium (2,135); Kansas City, MO
January 16, 1988*; 7:05 PM		at Tennessee Tech	L 54–56	2–10	17 – Oliver	9 – Davis	3 – Russell	Hooper Eblen Center (3,400); Cookeville, TN
January 18, 1988*; 7:05 PM		Tennessee State	L 68–74	2–11	14 – Francis, Russell	14 – Russell	8 – Russell	Municipal Auditorium (1,676); Kansas City, MO
January 25, 1988*; 7:05 PM		Oklahoma State	L 67–72	2–12	24 – Oliver	7 – Russell	7 – Russell	Municipal Auditorium (3,308); Kansas City, MO
January 28, 1988*; 7:05 PM		Centenary	L 75–88	2–13	18 – Oliver	7 – Russell	7 – Russell	Municipal Auditorium (1,468); Kansas City, MO
January 30, 1988*; 7:05 PM		Ball State	L 56–62	2–14	25 – Oliver	13 – Davis	7 – Francis	Municipal Auditorium (2,023); Kansas City, MO
February 1, 1988*; 7:05 PM		at Creighton	L 45–60	2–15	12 – Oliver	8 – Davis	4 – Molak	Omaha Civic Auditorium (3,242); Omaha, NE
February 2, 1988*; 7:05 PM		Mississippi Valley State	W 73–58	3–15	23 – Oliver	9 – Oliver	3 – Russell	Municipal Auditorium (1,185); Kansas City, MO
February 6, 1988*; 7:05 PM		Florida International	W 84–74	4–15	21 – Francis	16 – Davis	6 – Molak	Municipal Auditorium (2,684); Kansas City, MO
February 8, 1988*; 6:05 PM		at Morehead State	W 81–77	5–15	19 – Molak	11 – Oliver, Russell	7 – Molak	Ellis T. Johnson Arena (1,000); Morehead, KY
February 13, 1988*; 7:05 PM		United States International	W 87–68	6–15	22 – Oliver	14 – Davis	6 – Molak	Municipal Auditorium (2,865); Kansas City, MO
February 15, 1988*; 7:05 PM		at Texas–Pan American	W 83–80	7–15	17 – Petteway	10 – Davis, Oliver	8 – Russell	UTPA Fieldhouse (2,573); Edinburg, TX
February 22, 1988*; 7:05 PM		at Louisiana Tech	L 71–83	7–16	20 – Russell	8 – Francis	7 – Francis	Samuel M. Thomas; Assembly Center (2,840); Ruston, LA
February 27, 1988*; 6:05 PM		at Ball State	L 71–76	7–17	18 – Russell	6 – Oliver	7 – Russell	Irving Gymnasium (3,375); Muncie, IN
February 29, 1988*; 7:05 PM		at Arkansas State	L 68–82	7–18	14 – Davis, Petteway	10 – Davis	6 – Francis, Molak	Convocation Center (4,488); Jonesboro, AR
March 2, 1988*; 7:05 PM		South Alabama	W 85–83	8–18	18 – Francis	8 – Petteway, Russell	6 – Francis, Molak	Municipal Auditorium (3,212); Kansas City, MO
March 5, 1988*; 6:05 PM		at Florida International	W 79–76	9–18	26 – Davis	9 – Petteway	2 – Molak, Russell	Golden Panther Arena (653); Miami, FL
*Non-conference game. ^{#}Rankings from AP Poll. (#) Tournament seedings in parentheses. All times are in Central Standard Time (CST).
