= 1988 ACC men's basketball tournament =

- Classification: Division I
- Season: 1987–88
- Teams: 8
- Site: Greensboro Coliseum; Greensboro, North Carolina
- Champions: Duke (8th title)
- Winning coach: Mike Krzyzewski (2nd title)
- MVP: Danny Ferry (Duke)
- Television: Raycom Sports/Jefferson-Pilot Teleproductions (inside the ACC footprint); ESPN (Quarterfinals and Semifinals outside the ACC footprint); NBC (Finals outside the ACC footprint)

1987–88 ACC men's basketball standings
	Conf.				Overall
Team	W		L	PCT	W		L	PCT
No. 7 North Carolina	11	–	3	.786	27	–	7	.794
No. 14 NC State	10	–	4	.714	24	–	8	.750
No. 5 Duke †	9	–	5	.643	28	–	7	.800
Georgia Tech	8	–	6	.571	22	–	10	.688
Maryland	6	–	8	.429	18	–	13	.581
Virginia	5	–	9	.357	13	–	18	.419
Clemson	4	–	10	.286	14	–	15	.483
Wake Forest	3	–	11	.214	10	–	18	.357
† 1988 ACC tournament winner Rankings from AP Poll

The 1988 Atlantic Coast Conference men's basketball tournament took place in Greensboro, North Carolina, at the Greensboro Coliseum. Duke defeated North Carolina, 65–61, to win the championship. North Carolina lost their second championship game in a row. Danny Ferry of Duke was named tournament MVP.

== Bracket ==
Quarterfinals; March 11
1	#9 North Carolina	83
8	Wake Forest	62
4	#18 Georgia Tech	67
5	Maryland	84
2	#11 NC State	79
7	Clemson	77
3	#8 Duke	60
6	Virginia	48

Semifinals; March 12
1	#9 North Carolina	74
5	Maryland	64
2	#11 NC State	71
3	#8 Duke	73

Championship Game; March 13
1	#9 North Carolina	61
3	#8 Duke	65
