= 1988 SEC men's basketball tournament =

American college basketball postseason tournament

- Classification: Division I
- Season: 1987–88
- Teams: 10
- Site: Pete Maravich Assembly Center; Baton Rouge, Louisiana
- Champions: Kentucky (16th title)
- Winning coach: Eddie Sutton (2nd title)
- MVP: Rex Chapman (Kentucky)
- Attendance: 126,832
- Television: Jefferson-Pilot Teleproductions (First and Second Rounds, and semifinals); NBC (Kentucky-LSU Semifinal); ABC (Championship Game)

1987–88 Southeastern Conference men's basketball standings
| | Conf. | | | | Overall |
| Team | W | | L | PCT | W | | L | PCT |
|---|---|---|---|---|---|---|---|---|
| No. 6 Kentucky † | 13 | – | 5 | .722 | 27 | – | 6 | .818 |
| Auburn | 11 | – | 7 | .611 | 19 | – | 11 | .633 |
| Florida | 11 | – | 7 | .611 | 23 | – | 12 | .657 |
| LSU | 10 | – | 8 | .556 | 16 | – | 14 | .533 |
| Vanderbilt | 10 | – | 8 | .556 | 20 | – | 11 | .645 |
| Tennessee | 9 | – | 9 | .500 | 16 | – | 13 | .552 |
| Georgia | 8 | – | 10 | .444 | 20 | – | 16 | .556 |
| Ole Miss | 6 | – | 12 | .333 | 13 | – | 16 | .448 |
| Alabama | 6 | – | 12 | .333 | 14 | – | 17 | .452 |
| Mississippi State | 6 | – | 12 | .333 | 14 | – | 15 | .483 |
† 1988 SEC tournament winner Rankings from AP Poll

The 1988 SEC Men's Basketball Tournament took place from March 10–13, 1988 at the Pete Maravich Assembly Center in Baton Rouge, Louisiana. Kentucky won the tournament and received the SEC's automatic bid to the NCAA Division I men's basketball tournament, defeating Georgia by a score of 62–57. Kentucky's championship was later vacated due to NCAA violations. The Wildcats were also placed on probation.

Jefferson-Pilot Teleproductions (in its second season of producing regionally syndicated SEC basketball games) provided television coverage of the first round, the quarterfinals, and the semifinals. The Kentucky-LSU Semifinal aired on NBC with Marv Albert and Bucky Waters calling the action. Coverage of the championship game was broadcast on the ABC Television Network through its sports division, ABC Sports.

== Bracket ==
First Round; Thursday, March 10; Jefferson-Pilot Teleproductions
8 | Ole Miss | 64
9 | Alabama | 59^{OT}
7 | Georgia | 64
10 | Mississippi State | 43

Second Round; Friday, March 11; Jefferson-Pilot
1 | #6 Kentucky | 82
8 | Mississippi | 64
5 | Vanderbilt | 80
4 | LSU | 87
2 | Auburn | 60
7 | Georgia | 65
3 | Florida | 67
6 | Tennessee | 60

Semi-Finals; Saturday, March 12; Jefferson-Pilot/NBC
1 | #6 Kentucky | 86
4 | LSU | 80
7 | Georgia | 72
3 | Florida | 70

Finals; Sunday, March 13; ABC
1 | #6 Kentucky | 62
7 | Georgia | 57
