= 1987–88 Auburn Tigers men's basketball team =

American college basketball season

1987–88 Auburn Tigers men's basketball

NCAA tournament, second round
- Conference: Southeastern Conference
- Record: 19–11 (11–7 SEC)
- Head coach: Sonny Smith (10th season)
- Home arena: Joel H. Eaves Memorial Coliseum

1987–88 Southeastern Conference men's basketball standings
	Conf.				Overall
Team	W		L	PCT	W		L	PCT
No. 6 Kentucky †	13	–	5	.722	27	–	6	.818
Auburn	11	–	7	.611	19	–	11	.633
Florida	11	–	7	.611	23	–	12	.657
LSU	10	–	8	.556	16	–	14	.533
Vanderbilt	10	–	8	.556	20	–	11	.645
Tennessee	9	–	9	.500	16	–	13	.552
Georgia	8	–	10	.444	20	–	16	.556
Ole Miss	6	–	12	.333	13	–	16	.448
Alabama	6	–	12	.333	14	–	17	.452
Mississippi State	6	–	12	.333	14	–	15	.483
† 1988 SEC tournament winner Rankings from AP Poll

The 1987–88 Auburn Tigers men's basketball team represented Auburn University in the 1987–88 college basketball season. The team's head coach was Sonny Smith, who was in his tenth season at Auburn. The team played their home games at Joel H. Eaves Memorial Coliseum in Auburn, Alabama. They finished the season 19–11, 11–7 in SEC play. They lost to Georgia in the quarterfinals of the SEC tournament. They received an at-large bid to the NCAA tournament where they defeated Bradley to advance to the Second Round where they lost to Oklahoma.

The Tigers' most notable freshman signee was 7'0" center Matt Geiger. Geiger was pressed into service early as a starter when senior Jeff Moore went down with an early-season injury.

Junior forward Mike Jones, the Tigers' leading scorer and rebounder, was declared academically ineligible and left the team after seven games. As a result, sophomore John Caylor became a starting forward along with senior Chris Morris. Caylor paid an immediate dividend by hitting a game-winning 3-point shot with 10 seconds left to give the Tigers an early conference road victory over #1-ranked Kentucky.

Guards Gerald White and Frank Ford were lost to graduation, but seniors Terrence Howard and Johnny Lynn, sophomore Derrick Dennison, and juco transfer Keenan Carpenter were able to offset the loss.

== Roster ==
1987–88 Auburn Tigers men's basketball team
Players
Coaches

Pos.	#	Name	Height	Weight	Year	Previous school	Hometown
F	34	Chris Morris	6 ft 7 in (2.01 m)	—	Sr	Frederick Douglass High School	Atlanta, Georgia
F	13	Mike Jones	6 ft 7 in (2.01 m)	—	Jr	Columbus, Georgia
C	40	Jeff Moore	6 ft 8 in (2.03 m)	—	Sr	Midfield High School	Midfield, Alabama
G	10	Terrance Howard	6 ft 1 in (1.85 m)	—	Sr	Southwest High School	Southwest, AL
F	22	John Caylor	6 ft 6 in (1.98 m)	—	So	Morristown West High School	Talbott, Tennessee
C	25	Matt Geiger	7 ft 0 in (2.13 m)	—	Fr	Countryside High School	Clearwater, FL
G	30	Keenan Carpenter	6 ft 3 in (1.91 m)	—	Jr	Rutherfordton, Tennessee
G	24	Derrick Dennison	6 ft 4 in (1.93 m)	—	So	Douglass High School	Atlanta, Georgia
G	14	Johnny Lynn	6 ft 3 in (1.91 m)	—	Sr	Beech High School	Hendersonville, Tennessee
G	11	Melvin Haralson	6 ft 1 in (1.85 m)	—	Jr	Jackson, Mississippi

Head coach

- Sonny Smith (Milligan)

Assistant coach(es)

Legend

- (C) Team captain
- (S) Suspended
- (I) Ineligible
- (W) Walk-on
- Injured
- Current redshirt

== Schedule and results ==
Date time, TV	Rank^{#}	Opponent^{#}	Result	Record	Site (attendance) city, state
Regular season
Nov 27, 1987*		vs. South Alabama	W 120-67	1-0	Birmingham, AL; Birmingham-Jefferson Civic Center
Dec 1, 1987*		Virginia Commonwealth	W 93-80	2-0	Beard-Eaves Memorial Coliseum; Auburn, AL
Dec 7, 1987*		Tennessee-Martin	W 99-77	3-0	Beard-Eaves Memorial Coliseum; Auburn, AL
Dec 11, 1987*		vs. San Jose State; Illinois Classic	W 70-65	4-0	Assembly Hall; Champaign, IL
Dec 12, 1987*		at Illinois; Illini Classic	L 103-107	4-1	Assembly Hall; Champaign, IL
Dec 14, 1987*		Grambling State	W 98-59	5-1	Beard-Eaves Memorial Colliseum; Auburn, AL
Dec 16, 1987*		Mercer	W 80-48	6-1	Beard-Eaves Memorial Colliseum; Auburn, AL
Dec 29, 1987*		vs. Villanova; Cotton States Classic	W 65-64	7-1	Alexander Memorial Coliseum; Atlanta, GA
Dec 30, 1987*		at Georgia Tech; Cotton States Classic	L 72-83	7-2	Alexander Memorial Coliseum; Atlanta, GA
Jan 6, 1988; 7:00 p.m., JPT		No. 15 Florida	W 72-67	8-2 (1-0)	Beard-Eaves Memorial Coliseum; Auburn, AL
Jan 9, 1988		at No. 1 Kentucky	W 53-52	9-2 (2-0)	Rupp Arena; Lexington, KY
Jan 13, 1988	No. 19	at Georgia	L 68-87	9-3 (2-1)	Stegeman Coliseum; Athens, GA
Jan 16, 1988	No. 19	Mississippi State	W 65-57	10-3 (3-1)	Beard-Eaves Memorial Coliseum; Auburn, AL
Jan 20, 1988		at Tennessee	L 64-75	10-4 (3-2)	Thompson-Boling Arena; Knoxville, TN
Jan 23, 1988		Vanderbilt	L 71-75	10-5 (3-3)	Beard-Eaves Memorial Coliseum; Auburn, AL
Jan 27, 1988		Alabama	W 84-74	11-5 (4-3)	Beard-Eaves Memorial Coliseum; Auburn, AL
Jan 30, 1988		at Mississippi	L 66-69	11-6 (4-4)	C.M. Tad Smith Coliseum; Oxford, MS
Feb 3, 1988		LSU	L 69-78	11-7 (4-5)	Beard-Eaves Memorial Coliseum; Auburn, AL
Feb 6, 1988		at No. 19 Florida	W 58-57	12-7 (5-5)	Stephen C. O'Connell Center; Gainesville, FL
Feb 10, 1988		No. 10 Kentucky	L 62-69	12-8 (5-6)	Beard-Eaves Memorial Coliseum; Auburn, AL
Feb 13, 1988		Georgia	W 64-57	13-8 (6-6)	Beard-Eaves Memorial Coliseum; Auburn, AL
Feb 17, 1988		at Mississippi State	W 77-61	14-8 (7-6)	Humphrey Coliseum; Starkville, Ms
Feb 20, 1988		Tennessee	W 73-68	15-8 (8-6)	Beard-Eaves Memorial Coliseum; Auburn, AL
Feb 24, 1988		at No. 17 Vanderbilt	W 81-68	16-8 (9-6)	Memorial Gymnasium; Nashville, TN
Feb 27, 1988		at Alabama	L 77-82	16-9 (9-7)	Coleman Coliseum; Tuscaloosa, AL
March 2, 1988		Mississippi	W 92-76	17-9 (10-7)	Beard-Eaves Memorial Coliseum; Auburn, AL
March 5, 1988		at LSU	W 89-80	18-9 (11-7)	Maravich Assembly Center; Baton Rouge, LA
SEC Tournament
March 11, 1988; JPT	(2)	vs. (7) Georgia; Second Round	L 60-65	18-10	Maravich Assembly Center; Baton Rouge, LA
NCAA Tournament
March 17, 1988*	(8 SE)	vs. (9 SE) No. 11 Bradley; First Round	W 90-86	19-10	The Omni; Atlanta, GA
March 19, 1988*	(8 SE)	vs. (1 SE) No. 4 Oklahoma; Second Round	L 87-107	19-11	The Omni; Atlanta, GA
*Non-conference game. ^{#}Rankings from AP Poll. (#) Tournament seedings in parentheses. SE=Southeast. All times are in Central.
