= 1987–88 Kentucky Wildcats men's basketball team =

1987–88 season of University of Kentucky men's basketball team

1987–88 Kentucky Wildcats men's basketball
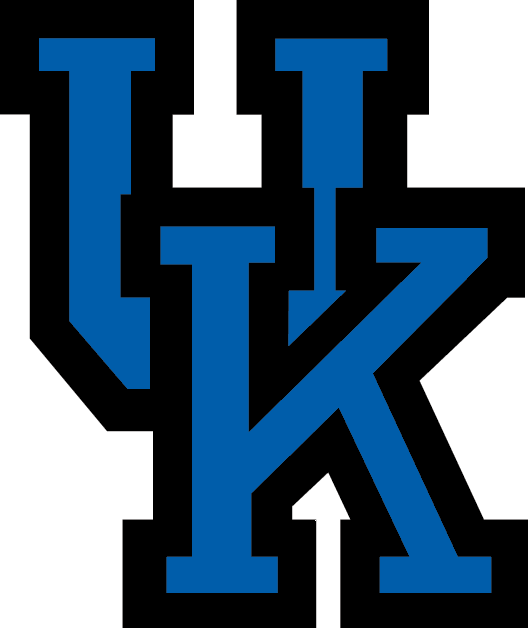

SEC tournament champion (vacated)

NCAA tournament, Sweet Sixteen (vacated)
- Conference: Southeastern Conference

Ranking
- Coaches: No. 5
- AP: No. 6
- Record: 25–5 (2 wins, 1 loss vacated) (13–5 SEC)
- Head coach: Eddie Sutton (3rd season)
- Assistant coach: James Dickey; Dwane Casey; Jimmy Dykes; Roger Harden
- Captains: Winston Bennett; Ed Davender; Cedric Jenkins; Rob Lock; Richard Madison
- Home arena: Rupp Arena

1987–88 Southeastern Conference men's basketball standings
	Conf.				Overall
Team	W		L	PCT	W		L	PCT
No. 6 Kentucky †	13	–	5	.722	27	–	6	.818
Auburn	11	–	7	.611	19	–	11	.633
Florida	11	–	7	.611	23	–	12	.657
LSU	10	–	8	.556	16	–	14	.533
Vanderbilt	10	–	8	.556	20	–	11	.645
Tennessee	9	–	9	.500	16	–	13	.552
Georgia	8	–	10	.444	20	–	16	.556
Ole Miss	6	–	12	.333	13	–	16	.448
Alabama	6	–	12	.333	14	–	17	.452
Mississippi State	6	–	12	.333	14	–	15	.483
† 1988 SEC tournament winner Rankings from AP Poll

The 1987–88 Kentucky Wildcats men's basketball team represented University of Kentucky in the 1987–88 NCAA Division I men's basketball season. The head coach was Eddie Sutton and the team finished the season with an overall record of 27–6. However, the team forfeited three of their games to finish 25–5. In the 1988 NCAA Tournament the Wildcats were invited as a #2 seed. After opening wins vs Southern and Maryland, they would face off vs Villanova. In the regional semi-finals Kentucky were defeated by Villanova 80–74.

== Schedule ==
Date time, TV	Rank^{#}	Opponent^{#}	Result	Record	Site city, state
Regular season
November 28*	No. 5	Hawaii	W 86–59	1–0	Rupp Arena; Lexington, KY
December 1*	No. 5	Cincinnati	W 101–77	2–0	Rupp Arena; Lexington, KY
December 5*	No. 2	vs. No. 5 Indiana; Big Four Classic	W 82–76 ^{OT}	3–0	Hoosier Dome; Indianapolis, IN
December 12*	No. 1	Louisville; Rivalry	W 76–75	4–0	Rupp Arena; Lexington, KY
December 18*	No. 1	Miami (OH); UK Invitational Tournament	W 85–71	5–0	Rupp Arena; Lexington, KY
December 19*	No. 1	UNC-Charlotte; UK Invitational Tournament	W 84–81	6–0	Rupp Arena; Lexington, KY
December 28*	No. 2	Alaska-Anchorage	W 100–58	7–0	Rupp Arena; Lexington, KY
December 31	No. 2	Vanderbilt	W 81–74	8–0 (1–0)	Rupp Arena; Lexington, KY
January 2	No. 2	vs. Georgia	W 84–77	9–0 (2–0)	Atlanta, GA
January 6	No. 1	Mississippi State	W 93–52	10–0 (3–0)	Rupp Arena; Lexington, KY
January 9	No. 1	Auburn	L 52–53	10–1 (3–1)	Rupp Arena; Lexington, KY
January 13	No. 5	at Alabama	W 63–55	11–1 (4–1)	Coleman Coliseum; Tuscaloosa, AL
January 16	No. 5	Tennessee	W 83–65	12–1 (5–1)	Rupp Arena; Lexington, KY
January 20	No. 4	Florida; Rivalry	L 56–58	12–2 (5–2)	Rupp Arena; Lexington, KY
January 23	No. 4	at LSU	W 76–61	13–2 (6–2)	LSU Assembly Center; Baton Rouge, LA
January 27	No. 9	at Vanderbilt	L 66–83	13–3 (6–3)	Memorial Gymnasium; Nashville, TN
January 31*	No. 9	vs. Notre Dame	W 78–69	14–3	Freedom Hall; Louisville, KY
February 3	No. 10	Ole Miss	W 94–65	15–3 (7–3)	Rupp Arena; Lexington, KY
February 6	No. 10	at Mississippi State	W 83–59	16–3 (8–3)	Humphrey Coliseum; Starkville, MS
February 10	No. 10	at Auburn	W 69–62	17–3 (9–3)	Beard-Eaves-Memorial Coliseum; Auburn, AL
February 13	No. 10	Alabama	W 82–68	18–3 (10–3)	Rupp Arena; Lexington, KY
February 17; 3:00 p.m., JPT	No. 9	at Tennessee	L 70–72	18–4 (10–4)	Thompson-Boling Arena; Knoxville, TN
February 20	No. 9	at Florida	L 76–83	18–5 (10–5)	O'Connell Center; Gainesville, FL
February 24	No. 12	LSU	W 95–69	19–5 (11–5)	Rupp Arena; Lexington, KY
February 28*	No. 12	No. 10 Syracuse	W 62–58	20–5	Rupp Arena; Lexington, KY
March 2; 8:00 p.m., JPT	No. 8	Georgia	W 80–72	21–5 (12–5)	Rupp Arena; Lexington, KY
March 5	No. 8	at Ole Miss	W 78–71	22–5 (13–5)	Tad Smith Coliseum; Oxford, MS
SEC tournament
March 11*; JPT	(1) No. 6	vs. (8) Ole Miss; SEC Tournament Quarterfinals	W 82–64	23–5	LSU Assembly Center; Baton Rouge, LA
March 12*; 12:00 p.m., JPT	(1) No. 6	vs. (4) LSU; SEC Tournament Semifinals	W 86–80	24–5	LSU Assembly Center; Baton Rouge, LA
March 13*; ABC	(1) No. 6	vs. (7) Georgia; SEC Tournament Championship	W 62–57	25–5	LSU Assembly Center; Baton Rouge, LA
NCAA tournament
March 18*	(2 SE) No. 6	vs. (15 SE) Southern; First Round	W 99–84	26–5 (win vacated)	Riverfront Coliseum; Cincinnati, OH
March 20*	(2 SE) No. 6	vs. (7 SE) Maryland; Second Round	W 90–81	27–5 (win vacated)	Riverfront Coliseum; Cincinnati, OH
March 24*	(2 SE) No. 6	vs. (6 SE) Villanova; Regional Semifinals	L 74–80	27–6 (loss vacated)	BJCC Arena; Birmingham, AL
*Non-conference game. ^{#}Rankings from AP Poll. (#) Tournament seedings in parentheses. SE=Southeast.
