= 1987–88 Florida Gators men's basketball team =

American college basketball season

1987–88 Florida Gators men's basketball

NCAA tournament, second round
- Conference: Southeastern Conference
- Record: 22–11 (11–7 SEC)
- Head coach: Norm Sloan (8th season)
- Assistant coach: Monte Towe (8th season)
- Captain: Vernon Maxwell
- Home arena: O'Connell Center

1987–88 Southeastern Conference men's basketball standings
	Conf.				Overall
Team	W		L	PCT	W		L	PCT
No. 6 Kentucky †	13	–	5	.722	27	–	6	.818
Auburn	11	–	7	.611	19	–	11	.633
Florida	11	–	7	.611	23	–	12	.657
LSU	10	–	8	.556	16	–	14	.533
Vanderbilt	10	–	8	.556	20	–	11	.645
Tennessee	9	–	9	.500	16	–	13	.552
Georgia	8	–	10	.444	20	–	16	.556
Ole Miss	6	–	12	.333	13	–	16	.448
Alabama	6	–	12	.333	14	–	17	.452
Mississippi State	6	–	12	.333	14	–	15	.483
† 1988 SEC tournament winner Rankings from AP Poll

The 1987–88 Florida Gators men's basketball team represented the University of Florida during the 1987–88 NCAA men's basketball season.

== Roster ==
1987–88 Florida Gators men's basketball team
Players
Coaches

Pos.	#	Name	Height	Weight	Year	Hometown
G	11	Vernon Maxwell	—	—	Sr
G	23	Clifford Lett	6 ft 3 in (1.91 m)	—	Jr	Pensacola	Pensacola, Florida
C	33	Dwayne Schintzius	7 ft 1 in (2.16 m)	—	So	Brandon	Brandon, Florida

Head coach

- Norm Sloan

Assistant coach(es)

Legend

- (C) Team captain
- (S) Suspended
- (I) Ineligible
- (W) Walk-on
- Injured
- Current redshirt

== Schedule ==
Date time, TV	Rank^{#}	Opponent^{#}	Result	Record	High points	High rebounds	High assists	Site city, state
November 21, 1987*	No. 14	Jacksonville; Preseason Big Apple NIT	W 82–52	1–0	–	–	–	O'Connell Center; Gainesville, FL
November 23, 1987*	No. 14	No. 18 Georgia Tech; Preseason Big Apple NIT	W 80–69	2–0	–	–	–	O'Connell Center; Gainesville, FL
November 27, 1987*; 8:00 p.m., USA	No. 14	vs. Iowa State; Preseason Big Apple NIT	W 96–89	3–0	–	–	–	Madison Square Garden (7,311); New York, NY
November 28, 1987*	No. 14	vs. Seton Hall; Preseason Big Apple NIT	W 70–68	4–0	–	–	–	Madison Square Garden; New York, NY
December 3, 1987*	No. 7	at SMU	L 76–82	4–1	–	–	–	Moody Coliseum; University Park, TX
December 12, 1987*	No. 12	Florida State; Rivalry	W 71–48	5–1	–	–	–	O'Connell Center; Gainesville, FL
December 16, 1987*	No. 11	Ohio State	W 102–69	6–1	–	–	–	O'Connell Center; Gainesville, FL
December 21, 1987*	No. 8	South Florida	W 83–69	7–1	–	–	–	O'Connell Center; Gainesville, FL
December 29, 1987*; 8:30 p.m.	No. 8	vs. No. 9 Duke; Fiesta Bowl Classic	L 70–93	7–2	–	–	–	McKale Center (13,284); Tucson, AZ
December 30, 1987*	No. 8	vs. Michigan State; Fiesta Bowl Classic	W 83–59	8–2	–	–	–	McKale Center; Tucson, AZ
January 2, 1988*; CBS	No. 8	at No. 3 Pittsburgh	L 68–80	8–3	–	–	–	Fitzgerald Field House; Pittsburgh, PA
January 4, 1988*	No. 15	Towson State	W 77–55	9–3	–	–	–	O'Connell Center; Gainesville, FL
January 6, 1988	No. 15	at Auburn	L 67–72	9–4 (0–1)	–	–	–	Beard-Eaves Memorial Coliseum; Auburn, AL
January 9, 1988	No. 15	Georgia	W 87–70	10–4 (1–1)	–	–	–	O'Connell Center; Gainesville, FL
January 13, 1988		at Mississippi State	W 55–45	11–4 (2–1)	–	–	–	Starkville, MS
January 16, 1988		Ole Miss	W 77–72	12–4 (3–1)	–	–	–	O'Connell Center; Gainesville, FL
January 20, 1988		at No. 4 Kentucky; Rivalry	W 58–56	13–4 (4–1)	–	–	–	Rupp Arena; Lexington, KY
January 23, 1988		at Tennessee	W 76–56	14–4 (5–1)	–	–	–	Thompson-Boling Arena; Knoxville, TN
January 27, 1988; JPT	No. 14	LSU	W 61–50	15–4 (6–1)	–	–	–	O'Connell Center; Gainesville, FL
January 30, 1988	No. 14	at Vanderbilt	L 65–92	15–5 (6–2)	–	–	–	Memorial Gymnasium; Nashville, TN
February 3, 1988	No. 19	at Alabama	W 74–64	16–5 (7–2)	–	–	–	Tuscaloosa, AL
February 6, 1988	No. 19	Auburn	L 57–58	16–6 (7–3)	–	–	–	O'Connell Center; Gainesville, FL
February 10, 1988		at Georgia	L 65–71	16–7 (7–4)	–	–	–	Athens, GA
February 13, 1988		Mississippi State	W 69–52	17–7 (8–4)	–	–	–	O'Connell Center; Gainesville, FL
February 15, 1988*		at Miami (FL)	W 83–73	18–7	–	–	–	Miami, FL
February 17, 1988		at Ole Miss	L 75–82	18–8 (8–5)	–	–	–	Oxford, MS
February 20, 1988; NBC		No. 9 Kentucky	W 83–76	19–8 (9–5)	–	–	–	O'Connell Center; Gainesville, FL
February 24, 1988		Tennessee	L 63–65	19–9 (9–6)	–	–	–	O'Connell Center; Gainesville, FL
March 2, 1988		No. 19 Vanderbilt	W 81–65	20–9 (10–6)	–	–	–	O'Connell Center; Gainesville, FL
March 5, 1988		Alabama	W 52–45	21–9 (11–6)	–	–	–	O'Connell Center; Gainesville, FL
March 9, 1988; ABC		at LSU	L 69–86	21–10 (11–7)	–	–	–	LSU Assembly Center; Baton Rouge, LA
March 11, 1988*; JPT		vs. Tennessee; SEC Tournament Quarterfinals	W 67–60	22–10	–	–	–	LSU Assembly Center; Baton Rouge, LA
March 12, 1988*; JPT		vs. Georgia; SEC Tournament Semifinals	L 70–72	22–11	–	–	–	LSU Assembly Center; Baton Rouge, LA
March 17, 1988*	No. (6)	vs. St. John's; NCAA Tournament	W 62–59		–	–	–	Jon M. Huntsman Center; Salt Lake City, UT
March 19, 1988*		vs. No. 10 Michigan; NCAA Tournament	L 85–108		–	–	–	Salt Lake City, UT
*Non-conference game. ^{#}Rankings from AP Poll. (#) Tournament seedings in parentheses. The two NCAA tournament results were vacated.
