= 1987–88 Vanderbilt Commodores men's basketball team =

American college basketball season

1987–88 Vanderbilt Commodores men's basketball

NCAA tournament, Sweet Sixteen
- Conference: Southeastern Conference
- Record: 20–11 (10–8 SEC)
- Head coach: C. M. Newton (7th season)
- Home arena: Memorial Gymnasium

1987–88 Southeastern Conference men's basketball standings
	Conf.				Overall
Team	W		L	PCT	W		L	PCT
No. 6 Kentucky †	13	–	5	.722	27	–	6	.818
Auburn	11	–	7	.611	19	–	11	.633
Florida	11	–	7	.611	23	–	12	.657
LSU	10	–	8	.556	16	–	14	.533
Vanderbilt	10	–	8	.556	20	–	11	.645
Tennessee	9	–	9	.500	16	–	13	.552
Georgia	8	–	10	.444	20	–	16	.556
Ole Miss	6	–	12	.333	13	–	16	.448
Alabama	6	–	12	.333	14	–	17	.452
Mississippi State	6	–	12	.333	14	–	15	.483
† 1988 SEC tournament winner Rankings from AP Poll

The 1987–88 Vanderbilt Commodores men's basketball men's basketball team represented Vanderbilt University as a member of the Southeastern Conference during the 1987–88 college basketball season. The team was led by head coach C. M. Newton and played its home games at Memorial Gymnasium.

The Commodores finished with a 20–11 record (10–8 SEC, T-4th) and received an at-large bid to the NCAA tournament. Vanderbilt made a run to the Sweet Sixteen before losing to the eventual National champion, Kansas.

== Roster ==
1987–88 Vanderbilt Commodores men's basketball team
Players
Coaches

Pos.	#	Name	Height	Weight	Year	Hometown
G	4	Barry Booker	6 ft 4 in (1.93 m)	—	Jr
G	12	Barry Goheen	6 ft 3 in (1.91 m)	—	Jr	Marshall County, Kentucky
C	32	Will Perdue	7 ft 0 in (2.13 m)	230 lb (104 kg)	Sr	Merritt Island, Florida
F	34	Frank Kornet	6 ft 9 in (2.06 m)	225 lb (102 kg)	Jr	Lexington, Kentucky

Head coach

- C. M. Newton (Kentucky)

Assistant coach(es)

Legend

- (C) Team captain
- (S) Suspended
- (I) Ineligible
- (W) Walk-on
- Injured
- Current redshirt

== Schedule and results ==
Date time, TV	Rank^{#}	Opponent^{#}	Result	Record	Site (attendance) city, state
Regular season
Nov 27, 1987*		Hawaii	W 91–62	1–0	Memorial Gymnasium; Nashville, Tennessee
Nov 30, 1987*		Lehigh	W 102–91	2–0	Memorial Gymnasium; Nashville, Tennessee
Dec 5, 1987*		No. 1 North Carolina	W 78–76	3–0	Memorial Gymnasium; Nashville, Tennessee
Dec 8, 1987*		at No. 6 Indiana	L 61–63	3–1	Assembly Hall; Bloomington, Indiana
Dec 19, 1987*		Ohio	W 93–77	4–1	Memorial Gymnasium; Nashville, Tennessee
Dec 21, 1987*		Morehead State	W 81–73	5–1	Memorial Gymnasium; Nashville, Tennessee
Dec 28, 1987*		East Carolina	W 99–63	6–1	Memorial Gymnasium; Nashville, Tennessee
Dec 29, 1987*		Cornell	W 95–79	7–1	Memorial Gymnasium; Nashville, Tennessee
Dec 31, 1987		at No. 2 Kentucky	L 74–81	7–2 (0–1)	Rupp Arena; Lexington, Kentucky
Jan 6, 1988		LSU	L 39–51	7–3 (0–2)	Memorial Gymnasium; Nashville, Tennessee
Jan 9, 1988		at Tennessee	L 72–80	7–4 (0–3)	Thompson-Boling Arena; Knoxville, Tennessee
Jan 13, 1988		at Ole Miss	W 60–57	8–4 (1–3)	Tad Smith Coliseum; Oxford, Mississippi
Jan 16, 1988		Alabama	W 76–60	9–4 (2–3)	Memorial Gymnasium; Nashville, Tennessee
Jan 20, 1988		Georgia	W 92–77	10–4 (3–3)	Memorial Gymnasium; Nashville, Tennessee
Jan 23, 1988		at Auburn	W 75–71	11–4 (4–3)	Beard-Eaves-Memorial Coliseum; Auburn, Alabama
Jan 27, 1988		No. 9 Kentucky	W 83–66	12–4 (5–3)	Memorial Gymnasium; Nashville, Tennessee
Jan 30, 1988		No. 14 Florida	W 92–65	13–4 (6–3)	Memorial Gymnasium; Nashville, Tennessee
Feb 3, 1988		Mississippi State	W 82–66	14–4 (7–3)	Memorial Gymnasium; Nashville, Tennessee
Feb 6, 1988	No. 15	at LSU	L 79–94	14–5 (7–4)	LSU Assembly Center; Baton Rouge, Louisiana
SEC tournament
Mar 11, 1988*	(5)	at (4) LSU; Quarterfinals	L 80–87	18–10	Maravich Assembly Center; Baton Rouge, Louisiana
NCAA tournament
Mar 18, 1988*	(7 MW)	vs. (10 MW) Utah State; First round	W 80–77	19–10	Bob Devaney Sports Center; Lincoln, Nebraska
Mar 20, 1988*	(7 MW)	vs. (2 MW) No. 8 Pittsburgh; Second round	W 80–74 ^{OT}	20–10	Bob Devaney Sports Center (14,433); Lincoln, Nebraska
Mar 25, 1988*	(7 MW)	vs. (6 MW) Kansas; Midwest Regional semifinal – Sweet Sixteen	L 64–77	20–11	Pontiac Silverdome; Pontiac, Michigan
*Non-conference game. ^{#}Rankings from AP Poll. (#) Tournament seedings in parentheses. E=East. All times are in Central Time.

== Awards and honors ==
- Will Perdue – SEC Player of the Year, SEC Athlete of the Year, Third-team All-American

== NBA draft ==
Round	Pick	Player	NBA club
1	11	Will Perdue	Chicago Bulls
