= 1987–88 Idaho Vandals men's basketball team =

American college basketball season

1987–88 Idaho Vandals men's basketball
- Conference: Big Sky Conference
- Record: 19–11 (11–5 Big Sky)
- Head coach: Tim Floyd (2nd season)
- Assistant coaches: Kermit Davis; Brett Iba
- Home arena: Kibbie Dome

1987–88 Big Sky Conference men's basketball standings
	Conf.				Overall
Team	W		L	PCT	W		L	PCT
Boise State †	13	–	3	.813	24	–	6	.800
Idaho	11	–	5	.688	19	–	11	.633
Montana State	10	–	6	.625	19	–	11	.633
Idaho State	8	–	8	.500	15	–	13	.536
Nevada	8	–	8	.500	15	–	13	.536
Montana	7	–	9	.438	18	–	11	.621
Northern Arizona	7	–	9	.438	10	–	18	.357
Weber State	6	–	10	.375	9	–	21	.300
Eastern Washington	2	–	14	.125	6	–	21	.222
† Conference tournament winner Rankings from AP poll

The 1987–88 Idaho Vandals men's basketball team represented the University of Idaho during the 1987–88 NCAA Division I men's basketball season. Members of the Big Sky Conference, the Vandals were led by second-year head coach Tim Floyd and played their home games on campus at the Kibbie Dome in Moscow, Idaho.

The Vandals were 19–10 overall in the regular season and 11–5 in conference play, runner-up in the standings. At the conference tournament in Bozeman, Montana, the Vandals earned a bye into the semifinals, but lost to host Montana State for the second time in a week.

After the season in late April, Floyd left for New Orleans and assistant Kermit Davis was promoted to head coach.

== Postseason result ==
Date time, TV	Rank^{#}	Opponent^{#}	Result	Record	Site (attendance) city, state
Non-conference regular season
Fri, Nov 27, 1987*		vs. Gonzaga	W 64–60	1–0	
Sat, Nov 28, 1987*		vs. Washington State	W 53–49	2–0	
Fri, Dec 4, 1987*		at Sam Houston State	L 54–60	2–1	Bernard Johnson Coliseum; Huntsville, Texas
Sat, Dec 5, 1987*		at UT Arlington	L 61–73	2–2	Texas Hall; Arlington, Texas
Fri, Dec 11, 1987*		vs. Marshall; Hawaii Tipoff Tournament	L 58–65	2–3	Neal S. Blaisdell Center; Honolulu, Hawaii
Big Sky tournament
Fri, March 11; 8:40 pm	(2)	at (3) Montana State; Semifinal	L 46–58	16–13	Brick Breeden Fieldhouse (9,027); Bozeman, Montana
*Non-conference game. ^{#}Rankings from AP poll. (#) Tournament seedings in parentheses. All times are in Pacific time.
