= 1987–88 NCAA Division I men's basketball season =

United States sports season

- Preseason AP No. 1: Syracuse Orangemen
- NCAA Tournament: 1988
- Tournament dates: March 17 – April 4, 1988
- National Championship: Kemper Arena; Kansas City, Missouri
- NCAA Champions: Kansas Jayhawks
- Other champions: Connecticut Huskies (NIT)
- Player of the Year (Naismith, Wooden): Danny Manning, Kansas Jayhawks

The 1987–88 NCAA Division I men's basketball season began in November 1987 and ended with the Final Four in Kansas City, Missouri on April 4, 1988.

== Season headlines ==
- Oklahoma became the first school to play for the national championship in both college football and college basketball in the same academic year. The football team lost the Orange Bowl on January 1, 1988, and in the 1988 NCAA tournament the basketball team lost the NCAA championship game on April 4, 1988.

== Season outlook ==
=== Pre-season polls ===
The top 20 from the AP Poll during the pre-season.

Associated Press
Ranking	Team
1	Syracuse
2	Purdue
3	North Carolina
4	Pittsburgh
5	Kentucky
6	Indiana
7	Kansas
8	Missouri
9	Michigan
10	Wyoming
11	Iowa
12	Temple
13	Louisville
14	Florida
15	Duke
16	Georgetown
17	Arizona
18	Georgia Tech
19	Oklahoma
20	DePaul

== Conference membership changes ==
School	Former conference	New conference
Akron Zips	Ohio Valley Conference	NCAA Division I Independent
Arkansas State Red Wolves	Southland Conference	American South Conference
Armstrong Atlantic State Pirates	Big South Conference	NCAA Division II Independent
Eastern Washington Eagles	NCAA Division I independent	Big Sky Conference
Florida International (FIU) Panthers	NCAA Division II independent	NCAA Division I independent
Lamar Cardinals	Southland Conference	American South Conference
Louisiana Tech Bulldogs	Southland Conference	American South Conference
Missouri-Kansas City (UMKC) Kangaroos	NAIA independent	NCAA Division I Independent
New Orleans Privateers	NCAA Division I Independent	American South Conference
Nicholls State Colonels	Gulf Star Conference	NCAA Division I Independent
Northwestern State Demons	Gulf Star Conference	Southland Conference
Oral Roberts Titans	Midwestern Collegiate Conference	NCAA Division I Independent
Sam Houston State Bearkats	Gulf Star Conference	Southland Conference
Southeastern Louisiana Lions	Gulf Star Conference	NCAA Division I Independent
Southwest Texas State Bobcats	Gulf Star Conference	Southland Conference
Southwestern Louisiana Ragin' Cajuns	NCAA Division I Independent	American South Conference
Stephen F. Austin Lumberjacks	Gulf Star Conference	Southland Conference
Tennessee State Tigers	NCAA Division I Independent	Ohio Valley Conference
Texas–Pan American Broncs	NCAA Division I Independent	American South Conference
Utica Pioneers	NCAA Division I Independent	NCAA Division III Independent
Wright State Raiders	NCAA Division II independent	NCAA Division I independent

== Regular season ==
=== Conferences ===
==== Conference winners and tournaments ====
Conference	Regular season winner	Conference player of the year	Conference Coach of the Year	Conference tournament	Tournament venue (City)	Tournament winner
American South Conference	Louisiana Tech & New Orleans	Ledell Eackles, New Orleans	Tommy Joe Eagles, Louisiana Tech & Kevin Wall, Pan American	1988 American South Conference men's basketball tournament	Montagne Center (Beaumont, Texas)	Louisiana Tech
AMCU–8	Southwest Missouri State	Ken McFadden, Cleveland State	Charlie Spoonhour, Southwest Missouri State	No Tournament		
Atlantic 10 Conference	Temple	Tim Perry, Temple	John Chaney, Temple	1988 Atlantic 10 men's basketball tournament	WVU Coliseum (Morgantown, West Virginia)	Temple
Atlantic Coast Conference	North Carolina	Danny Ferry, Duke	Jim Valvano, NC State	1988 ACC men's basketball tournament	Greensboro Coliseum (Greensboro, North Carolina)	Duke
Big East Conference	Pittsburgh	Charles Smith, Pittsburgh	P. J. Carlesimo, Seton Hall	1988 Big East men's basketball tournament	Madison Square Garden (New York City, New York)	Syracuse
Big Eight Conference	Missouri	Danny Manning, Kansas	Billy Tubbs, Oklahoma	1988 Big Eight Conference men's basketball tournament	Kemper Arena (Kansas City, Missouri)	Oklahoma
Big Sky Conference	Boise State	Arnell Jones, Boise State	Bobby Dye, Boise State	1988 Big Sky Conference men's basketball tournament	Brick Breeden Fieldhouse (Bozeman, Montana)	Boise State
Big South Conference	Coastal Carolina	Derek Wilson, Coastal Carolina	Russ Bergman, Coastal Carolina & Gary Edwards, Baptist	1988 Big South Conference men's basketball tournament	Winthrop Coliseum (Rock Hill, South Carolina)	Winthrop
Big Ten Conference	Purdue	Gary Grant, Michigan	Gene Keady, Purdue	No Tournament		
Colonial Athletic Association	Richmond	Kenny Sanders, George Mason	Ed Tapscott, American & Rick Barnes, George Mason	1988 CAA men's basketball tournament	Hampton Coliseum (Hampton, Virginia)	Richmond
East Coast Conference	Lafayette	Michael Anderson, Drexel	Butch van Breda Kolff, Lafayette	1988 East Coast Conference men's basketball tournament	Towson Center (Towson, Maryland)	Lehigh
ECAC Metro	Fairleigh Dickinson & Marist	Rik Smits, Marist	Wayne Szoke, Monmouth	1988 ECAC Metro men's basketball tournament	Rothman Center (Hackensack, New Jersey)	Fairleigh Dickinson
ECAC North	Siena	Larry Jones, Boston University	Skip Chappelle, Maine	1988 ECAC North men's basketball tournament	Hartford Civic Center (Hartford, Connecticut)	Boston University
Ivy League	Cornell	Paul Maley, Yale	None selected	No Tournament		
Metro Atlantic Athletic Conference	La Salle	Lionel Simmons, La Salle	Speedy Morris, La Salle	1988 MAAC men's basketball tournament	Meadowlands Arena (East Rutherford, New Jersey)	La Salle
Metro Conference	Louisville	Bimbo Coles, Virginia Tech & Pervis Ellison, Louisville	Frankie Allen, Virginia Tech	1988 Metro Conference men's basketball tournament	Mid-South Coliseum (Memphis, Tennessee)	Louisville
Mid-American Conference	Eastern Michigan	Grant Long, Eastern Michigan	Ben Braun, Eastern Michigan	1988 MAC men's basketball tournament	Centennial Hall (Toledo, Ohio)	Eastern Michigan
Mid-Eastern Athletic Conference	North Carolina A&T	Claude Williams, North Carolina A&T	Don Corbett, North Carolina A&T	1988 MEAC men's basketball tournament	Greensboro Coliseum (Greensboro, North Carolina)	North Carolina A&T
Midwestern Collegiate Conference	Xavier	Byron Larkin, Xavier	Pete Gillen, Xavier	1988 Midwestern Collegiate Conference men's basketball tournament	Market Square Arena (Indianapolis, Indiana)	Xavier
Missouri Valley Conference	Bradley	Hersey Hawkins, Bradley	Stan Albeck, Bradley	1988 Missouri Valley Conference men's basketball tournament	Carver Arena (Peoria, Illinois)	Bradley
Ohio Valley Conference	Murray State	Jeff Martin, Murray State	Steve Newton, Murray State	1988 Ohio Valley Conference men's basketball tournament	Racer Arena (Murray, Kentucky)	Murray State
Pacific-10 Conference	Arizona	Sean Elliott, Arizona	Lute Olson, Arizona	1988 Pacific-10 Conference men's basketball tournament	McKale Center (Tucson, Arizona)	Arizona
Pacific Coast Athletic Association	UNLV	Brian Shaw, UC Santa Barbara	Jerry Tarkanian, UNLV	1988 Pacific Coast Athletic Association men's basketball tournament	The Forum (Inglewood, California)	UNLV
Southeastern Conference	Kentucky	Will Perdue, Vanderbilt	C. M. Newton, Vanderbilt & Sonny Smith, Auburn	1988 SEC men's basketball tournament	Pete Maravich Assembly Center (Baton Rouge, Louisiana)	Kentucky
Southern Conference	Marshall	Skip Henderson, Marshall	Tom Apke, Appalachian State	1988 Southern Conference men's basketball tournament	Asheville Civic Center (Asheville, North Carolina)	Tennessee–Chattanooga
Southland Conference	North Texas State	Deon Hunter, North Texas State	Jimmy Gales, North Texas State	1988 Southland Conference men's basketball tournament	UNT Coliseum (Denton, Texas)	North Texas State
Southwest Conference	SMU	Darryl Middleton, Baylor		1988 Southwest Conference men's basketball tournament	Reunion Arena (Dallas, Texas)	SMU
Southwestern Athletic Conference	Southern	Avery Johnson, Southern	Ben Jobe, Southern	1988 SWAC men's basketball tournament		Southern
Sun Belt Conference	UNC Charlotte	Byron Dinkins, UNC Charlotte	Jeff Mullins, UNC Charlotte	1988 Sun Belt Conference men's basketball tournament	Richmond Coliseum (Richmond, Virginia)	UNC Charlotte
Trans America Athletic Conference	Georgia Southern & Arkansas–Little Rock	Jeff Sanders, Georgia Southern	Frank Kerns, Georgia Southern	1988 TAAC men's basketball tournament	Ocean Center (Daytona Beach, Florida)	Texas–San Antonio
West Coast Athletic Conference	Loyola Marymount	Levy Middlebrooks, Loyola Marymount	Paul Westhead, Loyola Marymount	1988 West Coast Athletic Conference men's basketball tournament	War Memorial Gymnasium (San Francisco, California)	Loyola Marymount
Western Athletic Conference	BYU	Michael Smith, BYU	LaDell Andersen, BYU	1988 WAC men's basketball tournament	Jon M. Huntsman Center (Salt Lake City, Utah)	Wyoming

==== Conference standings ====
1987–88 American South Conference men's basketball standings
	Conf.				Overall
Team	W		L	PCT	W		L	PCT
Louisiana Tech †	7	–	3	.700	22	–	9	.710
New Orleans	7	–	3	.700	21	–	11	.656
Lamar	5	–	5	.500	20	–	11	.645
Arkansas State	4	–	6	.400	21	–	14	.600
Pan American	4	–	6	.400	14	–	14	.500
Southwestern Louisiana	3	–	7	.300	12	–	16	.429
† 1988 American South tournament winner Rankings from AP Poll

1987–88 AMCU-8 Conference men's basketball standings
	Conf.				Overall
Team	W		L	PCT	W		L	PCT
SW Missouri State	12	–	2	.857	22	–	7	.759
Cleveland State	11	–	3	.786	22	–	8	.733
Wisconsin–Green Bay	9	–	5	.643	18	–	9	.667
Eastern Illinois	7	–	7	.500	17	–	11	.607
Western Illinois	6	–	8	.429	15	–	12	.556
Northern Iowa	4	–	10	.286	10	–	18	.357
Illinois-Chicago	4	–	10	.286	8	–	20	.286
Valparaiso	3	–	11	.214	12	–	16	.429
Rankings from AP Poll

1987–88 Atlantic 10 men's basketball standings
	Conf.				Overall
Team	W		L	PCT	W		L	PCT
No. 1 Temple †	18	–	0	1.000	32	–	2	.941
Rhode Island	14	–	4	.778	28	–	7	.800
West Virginia	12	–	6	.667	18	–	14	.563
Saint Joseph's	9	–	9	.500	15	–	14	.517
Penn State	9	–	9	.500	13	–	14	.481
George Washington	7	–	11	.389	13	–	15	.464
St. Bonaventure	7	–	11	.389	13	–	15	.464
Duquesne	6	–	12	.333	11	–	21	.344
UMass	5	–	13	.278	10	–	17	.370
Rutgers	3	–	15	.167	7	–	22	.241
† 1988 Atlantic 10 Tournament winner Rankings from AP Poll

1987–88 ACC men's basketball standings
	Conf.				Overall
Team	W		L	PCT	W		L	PCT
No. 7 North Carolina	11	–	3	.786	27	–	7	.794
No. 14 NC State	10	–	4	.714	24	–	8	.750
No. 5 Duke †	9	–	5	.643	28	–	7	.800
Georgia Tech	8	–	6	.571	22	–	10	.688
Maryland	6	–	8	.429	18	–	13	.581
Virginia	5	–	9	.357	13	–	18	.419
Clemson	4	–	10	.286	14	–	15	.483
Wake Forest	3	–	11	.214	10	–	18	.357
† 1988 ACC tournament winner Rankings from AP Poll

1987–88 Big East men's basketball standings
	Conf.				Overall
Team	W		L	PCT	W		L	PCT
No. 8 Pittsburgh	12	–	4	.750	24	–	7	.774
No. 9 Syracuse†	11	–	5	.688	26	–	9	.743
Georgetown	9	–	7	.563	20	–	10	.667
Villanova	9	–	7	.563	24	–	13	.649
St. John's	8	–	8	.500	17	–	12	.586
Seton Hall	8	–	8	.500	22	–	13	.629
Boston College	6	–	10	.375	18	–	15	.545
Providence	5	–	11	.313	11	–	17	.393
Connecticut	4	–	12	.250	20	–	14	.588
† 1988 Big East tournament winner As of April 4, 1988; Rankings from AP Poll

1987–88 Big Eight Conference men's basketball standings
	Conf.				Overall
Team	W		L	PCT	W		L	PCT
No. 4 Oklahoma†	12	–	2	.857	35	–	4	.897
No. 20 Kansas State	11	–	3	.786	25	–	9	.735
Kansas	9	–	5	.643	27	–	11	.711
Missouri	7	–	7	.500	19	–	11	.633
Iowa State	6	–	8	.429	20	–	12	.625
Oklahoma State	4	–	10	.286	14	–	16	.467
Nebraska	4	–	10	.286	13	–	18	.419
Colorado	3	–	11	.214	7	–	21	.250
† 1988 Big Eight tournament winner As of March 3, 2012; Rankings from AP poll

1987–88 Big Sky Conference men's basketball standings
	Conf.				Overall
Team	W		L	PCT	W		L	PCT
Boise State †	13	–	3	.813	24	–	6	.800
Idaho	11	–	5	.688	19	–	11	.633
Montana State	10	–	6	.625	19	–	11	.633
Idaho State	8	–	8	.500	15	–	13	.536
Nevada	8	–	8	.500	15	–	13	.536
Montana	7	–	9	.438	18	–	11	.621
Northern Arizona	7	–	9	.438	10	–	18	.357
Weber State	6	–	10	.375	9	–	21	.300
Eastern Washington	2	–	14	.125	6	–	21	.222
† Conference tournament winner Rankings from AP poll

1987–88 Big South Conference men's basketball standings
	Conf.				Overall
Team	W		L	PCT	W		L	PCT
Coastal Carolina	9	–	3	.750	17	–	11	.607
Baptist	8	–	4	.667	17	–	12	.586
Radford	8	–	4	.667	16	–	14	.533
Winthrop †	5	–	7	.417	17	–	13	.567
UNC Asheville	5	–	7	.417	13	–	15	.464
Augusta State	4	–	8	.333	8	–	18	.308
Campbell	3	–	9	.250	11	–	16	.407
† 1988 Big South tournament winner Rankings from AP Poll

1987–88 Big Ten Conference men's basketball standings
	Conf.				Overall
Team	W		L	PCT	W		L	PCT
No. 3 Purdue	16	–	2	.889	29	–	4	.879
No. 10 Michigan	13	–	5	.722	26	–	8	.765
No. 17 Iowa	12	–	6	.667	24	–	10	.706
No. 16 Illinois	12	–	6	.667	23	–	10	.697
Indiana	11	–	7	.611	19	–	10	.655
Ohio State	9	–	9	.500	20	–	13	.606
Wisconsin	6	–	12	.333	12	–	16	.429
Michigan State	5	–	13	.278	10	–	18	.357
Minnesota	4	–	14	.222	10	–	18	.357
Northwestern	2	–	16	.111	7	–	21	.250
Rankings from AP Poll

1987–88 CAA men's basketball standings
	Conf.				Overall
Team	W		L	PCT	W		L	PCT
Richmond †	11	–	3	.786	26	–	7	.788
American	9	–	5	.643	14	–	14	.500
George Mason	9	–	5	.643	20	–	10	.667
UNC-Wilmington	8	–	6	.571	15	–	14	.517
Navy	6	–	8	.429	12	–	16	.429
James Madison	5	–	9	.357	10	–	18	.357
William & Mary	5	–	9	.357	10	–	19	.345
East Carolina	3	–	11	.214	8	–	20	.286
† 1988 CAA tournament winner Rankings from AP Poll

1987–88 East Coast Conference men's basketball standings
	Conf.				Overall
Team	W		L	PCT	W		L	PCT
Lafayette	11	–	3	.786	19	–	10	.655
Delaware	9	–	5	.643	19	–	9	.679
Drexel	9	–	5	.643	18	–	10	.643
Lehigh †	8	–	6	.571	21	–	10	.677
Bucknell	7	–	7	.500	16	–	12	.571
Rider	6	–	8	.429	10	–	19	.345
Towson State	4	–	10	.286	14	–	16	.467
Hofstra	2	–	12	.143	6	–	21	.222
† 1988 ECC tournament winner Rankings from AP poll

1987–88 ECAC Metro men's basketball standings
	Conf.				Overall
Team	W		L	PCT	W		L	PCT
Fairleigh Dickinson†	13	–	3	.813	23	–	7	.767
Marist*	13	–	3	.813	18	–	9	.667
Monmouth	11	–	5	.688	16	–	13	.552
Robert Morris	9	–	7	.563	14	–	14	.500
Long Island	8	–	8	.500	14	–	14	.500
Loyola (MD)	6	–	10	.375	8	–	22	.267
St. Francis (NY)	5	–	11	.313	11	–	18	.379
Saint Francis (PA)	4	–	12	.250	7	–	20	.259
Wagner	3	–	13	.188	9	–	18	.333
† 1988 ECAC Metro tournament winner Rankings from AP Poll *Ineligible for conference tournament

1987–88 Ivy League men's basketball standings
	Conf.				Overall
Team	W		L	PCT	W		L	PCT
Cornell	11	–	3	.786	17	–	10	.630
Dartmouth	10	–	4	.714	18	–	8	.692
Princeton	9	–	5	.643	17	–	9	.654
Yale	8	–	6	.571	12	–	14	.462
Penn	8	–	6	.571	10	–	16	.385
Harvard	6	–	8	.429	11	–	15	.423
Brown	2	–	12	.143	6	–	20	.231
Columbia	2	–	12	.143	6	–	20	.231
Rankings from AP Poll

1987–88 MAAC men's basketball standings
	Conf.				Overall
Team	W		L	PCT	W		L	PCT
La Salle †	14	–	0	1.000	24	–	10	.706
Saint Peter's	11	–	3	.786	20	–	9	.690
Fordham	9	–	5	.643	18	–	15	.545
Holy Cross	8	–	6	.571	14	–	15	.483
Iona	5	–	9	.357	11	–	16	.407
Army	4	–	10	.286	9	–	19	.321
Fairfield	4	–	10	.286	8	–	20	.286
Manhattan	1	–	13	.071	7	–	23	.233
† 1988 MAAC tournament winner Rankings from AP Poll

1987–88 Metro Conference men's basketball standings
	Conf.				Overall
Team	W		L	PCT	W		L	PCT
Louisville †	9	–	3	.750	24	–	11	.686
Florida State	7	–	5	.583	19	–	11	.633
South Carolina	6	–	6	.500	19	–	10	.655
Virginia Tech	6	–	6	.500	19	–	10	.655
Memphis State	6	–	6	.500	20	–	12	.625
Southern Miss	5	–	7	.417	19	–	11	.633
Cincinnati	3	–	9	.250	11	–	17	.393
† 1988 Metro Conference tournament winner Rankings from AP Poll

1987–88 Mid-American Conference men's basketball standings
	Conf.				Overall
Team	W		L	PCT	W		L	PCT
Eastern Michigan †	14	–	2	.875	22	–	8	.733
Central Michigan	10	–	6	.625	19	–	13	.594
Ohio	9	–	7	.563	16	–	14	.533
Ball State	8	–	8	.500	14	–	14	.500
Western Michigan	7	–	9	.438	12	–	17	.414
Bowling Green	7	–	9	.438	12	–	16	.429
Kent State	6	–	10	.375	10	–	18	.357
Miami (OH)	6	–	10	.375	9	–	18	.333
Toledo	5	–	11	.313	15	–	12	.556
† 1988 MAC tournament winner Rankings from AP Poll

1987–88 MEAC men's basketball standings
	Conf.				Overall
Team	W		L	PCT	W		L	PCT
North Carolina A&T †	16	–	0	1.000	26	–	3	.897
Florida A&M	11	–	5	.688	22	–	8	.733
South Carolina State	10	–	6	.625	16	–	13	.552
Howard	9	–	7	.563	15	–	12	.556
Coppin State	8	–	7	.533	13	–	14	.481
Morgan State	7	–	8	.467	13	–	17	.433
Maryland Eastern Shore	5	–	11	.313	7	–	20	.259
Bethune–Cookman	4	–	12	.250	6	–	21	.222
Delaware State	1	–	15	.063	3	–	25	.107
† 1988 MEAC tournament winner Rankings from AP Poll

1987–88 Midwestern Collegiate Conference men's basketball standings
	Conf.				Overall
Team	W		L	PCT	W		L	PCT
No. 18 Xavier †	9	–	1	.900	26	–	4	.867
Evansville	6	–	4	.600	21	–	8	.724
Saint Louis	5	–	5	.500	14	–	14	.500
Butler	5	–	5	.500	14	–	14	.500
Loyola (IL)	3	–	7	.300	13	–	16	.448
Detroit Mercy	2	–	8	.200	7	–	23	.233
† 1988 MCC tournament winner Rankings from AP

1987–88 Missouri Valley Conference men's basketball standings
	Conf.				Overall
Team	W		L	PCT	W		L	PCT
No. 11 Bradley †	12	–	2	.857	26	–	5	.839
Wichita State	11	–	3	.786	20	–	10	.667
Illinois State	9	–	5	.643	18	–	13	.581
Southern Illinois	6	–	8	.429	12	–	16	.429
Creighton	6	–	8	.429	16	–	16	.500
Drake	5	–	9	.357	14	–	14	.500
Tulsa	4	–	10	.286	8	–	20	.286
Indiana State	3	–	11	.214	7	–	21	.250
† 1988 MVC tournament winner Rankings from AP Poll

1987–88 North Atlantic Conference men's basketball standings
	Conf.				Overall
Team	W		L	PCT	W		L	PCT
Siena	16	–	2	.889	23	–	6	.793
Boston University †	14	–	4	.778	23	–	8	.742
Hartford	12	–	6	.667	15	–	16	.484
Niagara	12	–	6	.667	15	–	15	.500
Northeastern	11	–	7	.611	15	–	13	.536
Maine	10	–	8	.556	13	–	15	.464
Canisius	7	–	11	.389	7	–	20	.259
New Hampshire	3	–	15	.167	4	–	25	.138
Colgate	3	–	15	.167	4	–	23	.148
Vermont	2	–	16	.111	3	–	24	.111
† 1988 North Atlantic tournament winner Rankings from AP Poll

1987–88 Ohio Valley Conference men's basketball standings
	Conf.				Overall
Team	W		L	PCT	W		L	PCT
Murray State †	13	–	1	.929	22	–	9	.710
Middle Tennessee	11	–	3	.786	23	–	11	.676
Austin Peay	10	–	4	.714	17	–	13	.567
Eastern Kentucky	10	–	4	.714	18	–	11	.621
Tennessee Tech	5	–	9	.357	12	–	16	.429
Tennessee State	4	–	10	.286	11	–	17	.393
Youngstown State	2	–	12	.143	7	–	21	.250
Morehead State	1	–	13	.071	5	–	22	.185
† 1988 Ohio Valley Tournament winner Rankings from AP Poll

1987–88 Pacific-10 Conference men's basketball standings
	Conf.				Overall
Team	W		L	PCT	W		L	PCT
No. 2 Arizona †	17	–	1	.944	35	–	3	.921
Oregon State	12	–	6	.667	20	–	11	.645
UCLA	12	–	6	.667	16	–	14	.533
Stanford	11	–	7	.611	21	–	12	.636
Oregon	10	–	8	.556	16	–	14	.533
Washington State	7	–	11	.389	13	–	16	.448
Arizona State	6	–	12	.333	13	–	16	.448
USC	5	–	13	.278	7	–	21	.250
California	5	–	13	.278	9	–	20	.310
Washington	5	–	13	.278	10	–	19	.345
† Conference tournament winner As of April 15, 1988; Rankings from AP Poll

1987–88 Pacific Coast Athletic Association men's basketball standings
	Conf.				Overall
Team	W		L	PCT	W		L	PCT
No. 12 UNLV	15	–	3	.833	28	–	6	.824
UC Santa Barbara	13	–	5	.722	22	–	8	.733
Utah State †	13	–	5	.722	21	–	10	.677
Long Beach State	11	–	7	.611	17	–	12	.586
UC Irvine	9	–	9	.500	16	–	14	.533
New Mexico State	8	–	10	.444	16	–	16	.500
San Jose State	8	–	10	.444	14	–	15	.483
Cal State Fullerton	7	–	11	.389	12	–	17	.414
Fresno State	6	–	12	.333	9	–	19	.321
Pacific	0	–	18	.000	5	–	24	.172
† 1988 PCAA tournament winner

1987–88 Southeastern Conference men's basketball standings
	Conf.				Overall
Team	W		L	PCT	W		L	PCT
No. 6 Kentucky †	13	–	5	.722	27	–	6	.818
Auburn	11	–	7	.611	19	–	11	.633
Florida	11	–	7	.611	23	–	12	.657
LSU	10	–	8	.556	16	–	14	.533
Vanderbilt	10	–	8	.556	20	–	11	.645
Tennessee	9	–	9	.500	16	–	13	.552
Georgia	8	–	10	.444	20	–	16	.556
Ole Miss	6	–	12	.333	13	–	16	.448
Alabama	6	–	12	.333	14	–	17	.452
Mississippi State	6	–	12	.333	14	–	15	.483
† 1988 SEC tournament winner Rankings from AP Poll

1987–88 Southern Conference men's basketball standings
	Conf.				Overall
Team	W		L	PCT	W		L	PCT
Marshall	14	–	2	.875	24	–	8	.750
Furman	11	–	5	.688	18	–	10	.643
Davidson	9	–	7	.563	15	–	13	.536
East Tennessee State	9	–	7	.563	14	–	15	.483
Chattanooga †	8	–	8	.500	20	–	13	.606
Appalachian State	8	–	8	.500	16	–	13	.552
VMI	6	–	10	.375	13	–	17	.433
The Citadel	5	–	11	.313	8	–	20	.286
Western Carolina	2	–	14	.125	8	–	19	.296
† 1988 SoCon Tournament winner Rankings from AP poll

1987–88 Southland Conference men's basketball standings
	Conf.				Overall
Team	W		L	PCT	W		L	PCT
North Texas State †	12	–	2	.857	17	–	13	.567
Northeast Louisiana	10	–	4	.714	21	–	9	.700
Sam Houston State	9	–	5	.643	14	–	14	.500
Northwestern State	7	–	7	.500	16	–	12	.571
Southwest Texas State	6	–	8	.429	9	–	22	.290
Stephen F. Austin	4	–	10	.286	10	–	18	.357
McNeese State	4	–	10	.286	7	–	22	.241
Texas-Arlington	4	–	10	.286	7	–	22	.241
† 1988 Southland Conference tournament winner Rankings from AP Poll

1987–88 Southwest Conference men's basketball standings
	Conf.				Overall
Team	W		L	PCT	W		L	PCT
SMU †	12	–	4	.750	28	–	7	.800
Arkansas	11	–	5	.688	21	–	9	.700
Baylor	11	–	5	.688	23	–	11	.676
Houston	10	–	6	.625	18	–	13	.581
Texas	10	–	6	.625	16	–	13	.552
Texas A&M	8	–	8	.500	16	–	15	.516
Texas Tech	4	–	12	.250	9	–	19	.321
TCU	3	–	13	.188	9	–	19	.321
Rice	3	–	13	.188	6	–	21	.222
† 1988 SWC tournament winner Rankings from AP Poll

1987–88 SWAC men's basketball standings
	Conf.				Overall
Team	W		L	PCT	W		L	PCT
Southern †	12	–	2	.857	24	–	7	.774
Texas Southern	11	–	3	.786	21	–	8	.724
Grambling State	9	–	5	.643	13	–	17	.433
Jackson State	7	–	7	.500	13	–	15	.464
Mississippi Valley State	5	–	9	.357	8	–	20	.286
Alcorn State	5	–	9	.357	8	–	21	.276
Alabama State	4	–	10	.286	8	–	20	.286
Prairie View A&M	3	–	11	.214	5	–	22	.185
† 1988 SWAC tournament winner Rankings from AP Poll

1987–88 Sun Belt Conference men's basketball standings
	Conf.				Overall
Team	W		L	PCT	W		L	PCT
UNC Charlotte †	11	–	3	.786	22	–	9	.710
VCU	10	–	4	.714	23	–	12	.657
Old Dominion	9	–	5	.643	18	–	12	.600
South Alabama	8	–	6	.571	15	–	14	.517
UAB	7	–	7	.500	16	–	15	.516
Western Kentucky	6	–	8	.429	15	–	13	.536
South Florida	3	–	11	.214	6	–	22	.214
Jacksonville	2	–	12	.143	8	–	21	.276
† 1988 Sun Belt Tournament winner Rankings from AP Poll

1987–88 Trans America Athletic Conference men's basketball standings
	Conf.				Overall
Team	W		L	PCT	W		L	PCT
Georgia Southern	15	–	3	.833	24	–	7	.774
Arkansas–Little Rock	15	–	3	.833	24	–	7	.774
UTSA †	13	–	5	.722	22	–	9	.710
Hardin-Simmons	10	–	8	.556	18	–	12	.600
Mercer	8	–	10	.444	15	–	14	.517
Centenary	8	–	10	.444	13	–	15	.464
Stetson	8	–	10	.444	13	–	15	.464
Georgia State	5	–	13	.278	9	–	19	.321
Houston Baptist	4	–	14	.222	9	–	18	.333
Samford	4	–	14	.222	7	–	20	.259
† 1988 TAAC tournament winner Rankings from AP Poll

1987–88 West Coast Athletic Conference men's basketball standings
	Conf.				Overall
Team	W		L	PCT	W		L	PCT
No. 15 Loyola Marymount †	14	–	0	1.000	28	–	4	.875
Saint Mary's	9	–	5	.643	19	–	9	.679
Santa Clara	9	–	5	.643	20	–	11	.645
Pepperdine	8	–	6	.571	17	–	13	.567
Gonzaga	7	–	7	.500	16	–	12	.571
San Francisco	5	–	9	.357	13	–	15	.464
San Diego	3	–	11	.214	11	–	17	.393
Portland	1	–	13	.071	6	–	22	.214
† Conference tournament winner Rankings from AP poll

1987–88 WAC men's basketball standings
	Conf.				Overall
Team	W		L	PCT	W		L	PCT
No. 19 BYU	13	–	3	.813	26	–	6	.813
No. 13 Wyoming †	11	–	5	.688	26	–	6	.813
Utah	11	–	5	.688	19	–	11	.633
UTEP	10	–	6	.625	23	–	10	.697
New Mexico	8	–	8	.500	22	–	14	.611
Colorado State	8	–	8	.500	22	–	13	.629
San Diego State	5	–	11	.313	12	–	17	.414
Air Force	4	–	12	.250	11	–	17	.393
Hawaii	2	–	14	.125	4	–	25	.138
† 1988 WAC tournament winner Rankings from AP poll

=== Division I independents ===
A total of 19 college teams played as Division I independents. Among them, Akron (21–7) had the best winning percentage (.750) and DePaul (22–8) finished with the most wins.

1987–88 NCAA Division I men's basketball independents standings
	Conf.				Overall
Team	W		L	PCT	W		L	PCT
Akron		–		–	21	–	7	.750
DePaul		–		–	22	–	8	.733
Notre Dame		–		–	20	–	9	.690
Wright State		–		–	16	–	11	.593
Miami (FL)		–		–	17	–	14	.548
UMBC		–		–	13	–	15	.464
Dayton		–		–	13	–	18	.419
Brooklyn		–		–	11	–	17	.393
Central Connecticut State		–		–	10	–	18	.357
Marquette		–		–	10	–	18	.357
Nicholls State		–		–	10	–	18	.357
U.S. International		–		–	10	–	18	.357
UMKC		–		–	9	–	18	.333
Central Florida		–		–	9	–	19	.321
Florida International		–		–	9	–	19	.321
Chicago State		–		–	8	–	20	.286
Northern Illinois		–		–	8	–	20	.286
Oral Roberts		–		–	8	–	21	.276
Southeastern Louisiana		–		–	7	–	21	.250
Rankings from AP Poll

=== Informal championships ===
Conference	Regular season winner	Most Valuable Player
Philadelphia Big 5	Temple	Lionel Simmons, La Salle

Temple finished with a 4–0 record in head-to-head competition among the Philadelphia Big 5.

=== Statistical leaders ===
Points per game			Rebounds per game			Assists per game			Steals per game		
Player	School	PPG	Player	School	RPG	Player	School	APG	Player	School	SPG
Hersey Hawkins	Bradley	36.3	Kenny Miller	Loyola (IL)	13.5	Avery Johnson	Southern	13.3	Aldwin Ware	Florida A&M	4.9
Daren Queenan	Lehigh	28.5	Rodney Mack	South Carolina St.	13.3	Anthony Manuel	Bradley	12.0	Marty Johnson	Towson St.	4.1
Anthony Mason	Tennessee St.	28.0	Jerome Lane	Pittsburgh	12.2	Craig Neal	Georgia Tech	9.5	Mookie Blaylock	Oklahoma	3.8
Grant Hayward	Loyola (IL)	26.1	Kenny Sanders	George Mason	11.7	Corey Gaines	Loyola Marymount	8.7	Haywoode Workman	Oral Roberts	3.6
Jeff Martin	Murray St.	26.0	Randy White	Louisiana Tech	11.6	Howard Evans	Temple	8.6	Avery Johnson	Southern	3.5

Blocked shots per game			Field-goal percentage			Three-Point FG percentage			Free-throw percentage		
Player	School	BPG	Player	School	FG%	Player	School	3FG%	Player	School	FT%
Rodney Blake	St. Joseph's	4.0	Arnell Jones	Boise St.	66.1	Glenn Tropf	Holy Cross	63.4	Steve Henson	Kansas St.	92.5
Rik Smits	Marist	3.9	Stanley Brundy	DePaul	65.8	Steve Kerr	Arizona	57.3	Archie Tullos	Detroit	90.8
Mike Brown	Canisius	3.7	Tony Holifield	Illinois St.	64.8	Mike Joseph	Bucknell	56.0	Jay Edwards	Indiana	90.8
Tim Perry	Temple	3.6	Jarvis Basnight	UNLV	64.8	Reginald Jones	Prairie View A&M	54.8	Jim Barton	Dartmouth	90.6
Roy Brow	Virginia Tech	3.6	Eric Leckner	Wyoming	64.4	Dave Orlandini	Princeton	54.5	LaBradford Smith	Louisville	90.5

== Postseason tournaments ==
=== NCAA tournament ===
==== Final Four - Kemper Arena, Kansas City, Missouri ====
National semifinals
E2	Duke	59
M6	Kansas	66
S1	Oklahoma	86
W1	Arizona	78

National championship game
M6	Kansas	83
S1	Oklahoma	79

=== National Invitation tournament ===
==== NIT Semifinals and Final ====
Semifinals
Boston College	67
Connecticut	73
Ohio State	64
Colorado State	62

Finals
Connecticut	72
Ohio State	67

Third place game
Boston College	57
Colorado State	58

== Award winners ==
=== Consensus All-American teams ===
Consensus First Team
Player	Position	Class	Team
Sean Elliott	F	Junior	Arizona
Gary Grant	G	Senior	Michigan
Hersey Hawkins	G	Senior	Bradley
Danny Manning	F	Senior	Kansas
J.R. Reid	F/C	Sophomore	North Carolina

Consensus Second Team
Player	Position	Class	Team
Danny Ferry	F	Junior	Duke
Jerome Lane	F	Junior	Pittsburgh
Mark Macon	G	Freshman	Temple
Mitch Richmond	G	Senior	Kansas State
Rony Seikaly	C	Senior	Syracuse
Michael Smith	F/C	Junior	Brigham Young

=== Major player of the year awards ===
- Wooden Award: Danny Manning, Kansas
- Naismith Award: Danny Manning, Kansas
- Associated Press Player of the Year: Hersey Hawkins, Bradley
- UPI Player of the Year: Hersey Hawkins, Bradley
- NABC Player of the Year: Danny Manning, Kansas
- Oscar Robertson Trophy (USBWA): Hersey Hawkins, Bradley
- Adolph Rupp Trophy: Hersey Hawkins, Bradley
- Sporting News Player of the Year: Hersey Hawkins, Bradley

=== Major coach of the year awards ===
- Associated Press Coach of the Year: John Chaney, Temple
- UPI Coach of the Year: John Chaney, Temple
- Henry Iba Award (USBWA): John Chaney, Temple
- NABC Coach of the Year: John Chaney, Temple
- Naismith College Coach of the Year: Larry Brown, Kansas
- CBS/Chevrolet Coach of the Year: John Chaney, Temple
- Sporting News Coach of the Year: John Chaney, Temple

=== Other major awards ===
- Frances Pomeroy Naismith Award (Best player under 6'0): Jerry Johnson, Florida Southern
- Robert V. Geasey Trophy (Top player in Philadelphia Big 5): Lionel Simmons, La Salle
- NIT/Haggerty Award (Top player in New York City metro area): Mark Bryant, Seton Hall

== Coaching changes ==
A number of teams changed coaches during the season and after it ended.

Team	Former Coach	Interim Coach	New Coach	Reason
Cal State Fullerton	George McQuarn		John Sneed	
Central Connecticut State	Bill Detrick	Charles Jones	Mike Brown	
Delaware State	Marshall Emery		Jeff Jones	
Detroit Mercy	Don Sicko	John Mulroy	Rick Byrdsong	Birdsong was hired from the Arizona coaching staff.
Drake	Gary Garner		Tom Abatemarco	
George Mason	Rick Barnes		Ernie Nestor	Barnes left to coach Providence. Nestor was hired from the California coaching staff.
Hardin–Simmons	Dick Danford		Dennis Harp	
Hofstra	Dick Berg		Butch van Breda Kolff	
Idaho	Tim Floyd		Kermit Davis	Floyd left to coach New Orleans. Davis was an assistant under Floyd.
James Madison	John Thurston	Tom McCorry	Lefty Driesell	
Kansas	Larry Brown		Roy Williams	
Lafayette	Butch van Breda Kolff		John Leone	
Lamar	Tom Abatemarco		Tony Branch	Abatemarco left to coach Drake.
Lehigh	Fran McCaffery		Dave Duke	McCaffery left to join the Notre Dame coaching staff. Duke was an assistant under McCaffery.
Maine	Skip Chappelle		Rudy Keeling	Keeling was hired from the Marquette coaching staff.
Manhattan Jaspers	Bob Delle Bovi		Steve Lappas	Lappas was hired from the Villanova coaching staff.
New Mexico	Gary Colson		Dae Bliss	Colson left to coach Fresno State.
New Orleans	Art Tolis		Tim Floyd	
Northern Arizona	Jay Arnote		Pat Rafferty	
Northwestern State	Don Beasley		Dan Bell	
Pacific	Tom O'Neill	Denis Willens	Bob Thomason	
Pepperdine	Jim Harrick		Tom Asbury	Harrick left to coach UCLA. Asbury was an assistant under Harrick.
Providence	Gordon Chiesa		Rick Barnes	Chiesa was left go after a disappointing season.
Radford	Joe Davis		Oliver Purnell	Purnell was hired from the Maryland coaching staff.
Rhode Island	Tom Penders		Al Skinner	Penders left to coach Texas. Skinner was an assistant under Penders.
Rutgers	Craig Littlepage		Bob Wenzel	
SMU	Dave Bliss		John Shumate	Bliss left to coach New Mexico.
SE Louisiana	Newton Chelette		Leo McClure	
St. Francis (NY)	Bob Valvano		Rich Zvosec	
Stephen F. Austin	Harry Miller		Mike Martin	
Tennessee Tech	Tom Deaton		Frank Harrell	
Texas	Bob Weltlich		Tom Penders	
UCLA	Walt Hazzard		Jim Harrick	
UMBC	Jeff Bzdelik		Earl Hawkins	Bzdelik left to join the coaching staff of the Washington Bullets.
Texas–Arlington	Jerry Stone		Mark Nixon	
UMass	Ron Gerlufsen		John Calipari	
UNC Asheville	Jerry Green		Don Doucette	
Valparaiso	Tom Smith		Homer Drew	
Weber State	Larry Farmer		Denny Huston	
Western Carolina	Herb Krusen		Dave Possinger	
