= 1987–88 Wisconsin Badgers men's basketball team =

American college basketball season

1987–88 Wisconsin Badgers men's basketball
- Conference: Big Ten Conference
- Record: 12–16 (6–12 Big Ten)
- Head coach: Steve Yoder (6th season)
- Assistant coaches: Ray McCallum (4th season); Brad McNulty (6th season); Ron Zentner (1st season)
- Home arena: Wisconsin Field House

1987–88 Big Ten Conference men's basketball standings
	Conf.				Overall
Team	W		L	PCT	W		L	PCT
No. 3 Purdue	16	–	2	.889	29	–	4	.879
No. 10 Michigan	13	–	5	.722	26	–	8	.765
No. 17 Iowa	12	–	6	.667	24	–	10	.706
No. 16 Illinois	12	–	6	.667	23	–	10	.697
Indiana	11	–	7	.611	19	–	10	.655
Ohio State	9	–	9	.500	20	–	13	.606
Wisconsin	6	–	12	.333	12	–	16	.429
Michigan State	5	–	13	.278	10	–	18	.357
Minnesota	4	–	14	.222	10	–	18	.357
Northwestern	2	–	16	.111	7	–	21	.250
Rankings from AP Poll

The 1987–88 Wisconsin Badgers men's basketball team represented the University of Wisconsin as a member of the Big Ten Conference during the 1987–88 NCAA Division I men's basketball season. The team was coached by Steve Yoder, coaching his sixth season with Wisconsin. The Badgers finished 12–16, 6–12 in Big Ten play to finish in seventh place.

== Roster ==
1987–88 Wisconsin Badgers men's basketball team
Players
Coaches

Pos.	#	Name	Height	Weight	Year	Hometown
G	10	Billy Douglass (injured) (redshirt)	6 ft 4 in (1.93 m)	170 lb (77 kg)	Fr	Lake Forest, Illinois
G	14	Rodney Tapp (C)	6 ft 0 in (1.83 m)	170 lb (77 kg)	Sr	Evansville, Indiana
G	20	Byron Robinson	6 ft 5 in (1.96 m)	185 lb (84 kg)	RS Fr	Springfield, Illinois
G	22	Pollis Robertson	6 ft 7 in (2.01 m)	210 lb (95 kg)	Jr	Wayne, Michigan
G	23	Willie Simms (I*)	6 ft 5 in (1.96 m)	170 lb (77 kg)	Fr	Pontiac, Michigan
G/F	30	Tom Molaski (C)	6 ft 6 in (1.98 m)	200 lb (91 kg)	Jr	Grafton, Wisconsin
G	32	Trent Jackson	6 ft 1 in (1.85 m)	180 lb (82 kg)	Jr	Bolingbrook, Illinois
G	33	Sean Fleming	6 ft 2 in (1.88 m)	195 lb (88 kg)	So	Oakland, California
F	41	Rob Willey	6 ft 9 in (2.06 m)	220 lb (100 kg)	RS So	Neenah, Wisconsin
F	43	Patrick Tompkins	6 ft 6 in (1.98 m)	230 lb (104 kg)	Fr	Waukegan, Illinois
G	44	Tim Locum	6 ft 4 in (1.93 m)	175 lb (79 kg)	Fr	Flora, Illinois
F	50	Danny Jones	6 ft 6 in (1.98 m)	240 lb (109 kg)	So	Rockford, Illinois
C	52	Darin Schubring	6 ft 10 in (2.08 m)	230 lb (104 kg)	Jr	Baraboo, Wisconsin
F	53	Kurt Portmann	6 ft 11 in (2.11 m)	220 lb (100 kg)	So	Sheboygan, Wisconsin
F/C	55	Greg Sipla (W) (redshirt)	6 ft 10 in (2.08 m)	225 lb (102 kg)	Jr	Racine, Wisconsin

Head coach

- Steve Yoder (Illinois Wesleyan)

Assistant coach(es)

- Brad McNulty (Purdue)
- Ray McCallum (Ball State)
- Rod Zentner (UW-La Crosse)

Legend

- (C) Team captain
- (S) Suspended
- (I) Ineligible
- (W) Walk-on
- Injured
- Current redshirt

*academically ineligible second semester

== Schedule and results ==
Date time, TV	Rank^{#}	Opponent^{#}	Result	Record	Site city, state
Non-conference regular season
Nov 28, 1987*		at South Florida	W 58–55	1–0	Sun Dome (3,736); Tampa, FL
Dec 1, 1987*		Northern Illinois	W 87–77	2–0	Dane County Coliseum (5,642); Madison, WI
Dec 3, 1987*		at Eastern Illinois	L 52–59	2–1	Lantz Arena (4,793); Charleston, IL
Dec 5, 1987*		Butler	W 92–80	3–1	Wisconsin Field House (5,344); Madison, WI
Dec 8, 1987*		at Southern Illinois	L 76–80	3–2	SIU Arena (4,475); Carbondale, IL
Dec 10, 1987*		Marquette	W 66–55	4–2	Wisconsin Field House (9,009); Madison, WI
Dec 12, 1987*		Loyola (IL)	L 75–78	4–3	Wisconsin Field House (5,479); Madison, WI
Dec 28, 1987*		at No. 15 UNLV; Rebel Classic	L 65–102	4–4	Thomas & Mack Center (15,971); Paradise, NV
Dec 29, 1987*		vs. Northern Iowa; Rebel Classic	W 64–56	5–4	Thomas & Mack Center (2,000); Paradise, NV
Jan 3, 1988*		Washington State	W 80–65	6–4	Wisconsin Field House (6,205); Madison, WI
Big Ten regular season
Jan 7, 1988		Michigan State	W 78–72 ^{2OT}	7–4 (1–0)	Wisconsin Field House (6,743); Madison, WI
Jan 9, 1988		Ohio State	W 64–63	8–4 (2–0)	Wisconsin Field House (8,862); Madison, WI
Jan 14, 1988		at No. 15 Indiana	L 53–55	8–5 (2–1)	Assembly Hall (15,230); Bloomington, IN
Jan 16, 1988		No. 20 Illinois	L 65–80	8–6 (2–2)	Wisconsin Field House (11,068); Madison, WI
Jan 21, 1988		at No. 7 Michigan	L 54–65	8–7 (2–3)	Crisler Arena (13,459); Ann Arbor, MI
Jan 25, 1988		No. 19 Iowa	L 89–104	8–8 (2–4)	Wisconsin Field House (9,119); Madison, WI
Jan 30, 1988		Northwestern	W 80–59	9–8 (3–4)	Wisconsin Field House (8,838); Madison, WI
Feb 3, 1988		at No. 6 Purdue	L 62–86	9–9 (3–5)	Mackey Arena (14,123); West Lafayette, IN
Feb 8, 1988		at Minnesota	L 62–71	9–10 (3–6)	Williams Arena (10,742); Minneapolis, MN
Feb 11, 1988		No. 12 Michigan	L 67–80	9–11 (3–7)	Wisconsin Field House (7,496); Madison, WI
Feb 13, 1988		at Ohio State	L 53–78	9–12 (3–8)	St. John Arena (13,320); Columbus, OH
Feb 21, 1988		at Illinois	L 65–85	9–13 (3–9)	Assembly Hall (16,348); Champaign, IL
Feb 24, 1988		Indiana	L 74–84	9–14 (3–10)	Wisconsin Field House (9,229); Madison, WI
Feb 28, 1988		Minnesota	W 81–70	10–14 (4–10)	Wisconsin Field House (9,015); Madison, WI
Mar 3, 1988		No. 2 Purdue	L 56–84	10–15 (4–11)	Wisconsin Field House (8,496); Madison, WI
Mar 5, 1988		at Northwestern	W 74–69	11–15 (5–11)	Welsh-Ryan Arena (6,473); Evanston, IL
Mar 10, 1988		at No. 15 Iowa	L 70–103	11–16 (5–12)	Carver-Hawkeye Arena (15,500); Iowa City, IA
Mar 12, 1988		at Michigan State	W 71–69	12–16 (6–12)	Jenison Fieldhouse (8,158); East Lansing, MI
*Non-conference game. ^{#}Rankings from AP Poll. (#) Tournament seedings in parentheses.

== Player statistics ==
Individual player statistics (Final)
			Minutes		Scoring		Total FGs			3-point FGs			Free Throws			Rebounds								
Player	GP	GS	Tot	Avg	Pts	Avg	FG	FGA	Pct	3FG	3FA	Pct	FT	FTA	Pct	Off	Def	Tot	Avg	A	TO	Blk	Stl	PF
Jackson, Trent	28	28	1032	36.9	546	19.5	192	426	.451	74	164	.451	88	106	.830	-	-	106	3.8	98	66	4	59	59
Jones, Danny	26	25	831.5	32.0	441	17.0	176	309	.570	0	1	.000	89	124	.718	-	-	121	4.7	26	50	17	14	83
Locum, Tim	28	3	478	17.1	187	6.7	58	137	.423	41	93	.441	30	35	.857	-	-	41	1.5	41	35	2	16	45
Molaski, Tom	28	19	745	26.6	158	5.6	49	128	.383	6	17	.353	54	67	.806	-		106	3.8	104	53	3	42	68
Tapp, Rodney	28	15	551	19.7	153	5.5	62	129	.481	4	12	.333	25	43	.581	-	-	51	1.8	43	41	0	14	48
Portmann, Kurt	28	23	681	24.3	151	5.4	62	160	.388	0	0	.000	27	49	.551	-	-	101	3.6	33	57	25	16	94
Tompkins, Patrick	27	7	426.5	15.8	120	4.4	46	95	.484	0	3	.000	28	54	.519	-	-	88	3.3	32	43	9	7	24
Schubring, Darin	28	13	526.5	18.8	93	3.3	41	89	.461	0	0	.000	11	36	.306	-	-	101	3.6	29	30	5	9	71
Robinson, Byron	19	6	266	14.0	63	3.3	19	48	.396	0	0	.000	25	33	.758	-	-	34	1.8	30	33	1	18	19
Simms, Willie	2	1	18	9.0	4	2.0	1	4	.250	0	0	.000	2	5	.400	-	-	7	3.5	3	2	0	0	1
Fleming, Sean	7	0	45	6.4	8	1.1	2	5	.400	1	2	.500	3	4	.750	-	-	2	0.3	3	9	0	1	3
Willey, Rob	8	0	18	2.3	4	0.5	1	2	.500	0	0	.000	2	4	.500	-	-	3	0.4	0	2	1	0	2
Robertson, Pollis	15	0	31.5	2.1	5	0.3	1	7	.143	0	0	.000	3	9	.333	-	-	6	0.4	0	7	1	0	1
Total	28	-	5650	40.4	1933	69.0	710	1539	.461	126	292	.432	387	569	.680	-	-	841	30.0	442	429	68	196	518
Opponents	28	-	5650	40.4	2084	74.4	784	1585	.495	108	264	.409	408	560	.729	-	-	968	34.6	462	461	84	199	562

Legend
GP	Games played	GS	Games started	Tot	Total count	Avg	Average per game	Pts	Points
FG	Field goals made	FGA	Field goal attempts	3FG	3-pointers made	3FA	3-point attempts	FT	Free throws made
FTA	Free throw attempts	Off	Offensive rebounds	Def	Defensive rebounds	A	Assists	TO	Turnovers
Blk	Blocks	Stl	Steals	PF	Personal fouls	Team high

== Awards and honors ==
Trent Jackson - Third Team All-Big Ten (UPI)
