= 1988 Big Sky Conference men's basketball tournament =

- Classification: Division I
- Season: 1987–88
- Teams: 8
- Site: Brick Breeden Fieldhouse; Bozeman, Montana
- Champions: Boise State (2nd title)
- Winning coach: Bobby Dye (1st title)
- MVP: Chris Childs (Boise State)

1987–88 Big Sky men's basketball standings
	Conf.				Overall
Team	W		L	PCT	W		L	PCT
Boise State †	13	–	3	.813	24	–	6	.800
Idaho	11	–	5	.688	19	–	11	.633
Montana State	10	–	6	.625	18	–	11	.621
Idaho State	8	–	8	.500	15	–	13	.536
Nevada	8	–	8	.500	15	–	13	.536
Montana	7	–	9	.438	18	–	11	.621
Northern Arizona	6	–	9	.400	9	–	18	.333
Weber State	6	–	9	.400	9	–	20	.310
Eastern Washington	2	–	14	.125	6	–	21	.222
† Conference tournament winner

The 1988 Big Sky Conference men's basketball tournament was the thirteenth edition, held March 9–12 at Brick Breeden Fieldhouse at Montana State University in Bozeman, Montana.

Regular season champion Boise State defeated defending tournament champion and host Montana State in the championship game, 63–61, to clinch their second Big Sky tournament. BSU had won the first conference tournament twelve years earlier.

== Format ==
The Big Sky added Eastern Washington in the summer of 1987 to bring total conference membership to nine, but the last-place Eagles were ineligible for the postseason due to recruiting violations.

In the two previous conference tournaments, teams from the lower half of the standings won the title and were seeded sixteenth (last) in the West regional of the NCAA tournament. Montana State won in 1986 after tying for sixth in the standings. The next year, the top three seeds were upset in the first round (quarterfinals), and seventh-seed Idaho State won the title. The Bengals (15–15) met top-ranked UNLV (33–1) in the first round in Salt Lake City and were routed.

The Big Sky implemented a few changes to the bracket structure to reward regular season play. The top two teams in the league standings were given byes into the semifinal round, while the next two began play in the quarterfinals on Thursday. The remaining four teams (seeds 5–8) played an additional game on Wednesday; four victories in as many days were now required for a lower-half team to win the title.

The top four seeds advanced to the semifinals, and the tournament was won by the top-seed.

== Bracket ==
First round Wednesday, March 9
5	Nevada	93
8	Weber State	96
7	Northern Arizona	72
6	Montana	77

Quarterfinals; Thursday, March 10
8	Weber State	57
4	Idaho State	58
3	Montana State	60
6	Montana	54

Semifinals; Friday, March 11
1	Boise State	87
4	Idaho State	56
3	Montana State	58
2	Idaho	46

Championship; Saturday, March 12
1	Boise State	63
3	Montana State	61

== NCAA tournament ==
Boise State (24–5) received the conference's automatic bid to the NCAA tournament, and no other Big Sky members were invited to the tournament or the NIT. The Broncos were the fourteenth seed in the West region and gave third-seeded Michigan a scare in Salt Lake City, as the Wolverines' large lead eroded in the second half; Michigan prevailed by five points.
