= 1987–88 Boise State Broncos men's basketball team =

American college basketball season

1987–88 Boise State Broncos men's basketball
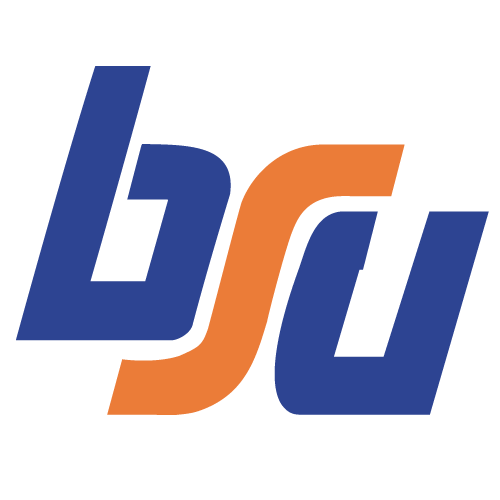

Big Sky regular season and tournament champions

NCAA tournament, First round
- Conference: Big Sky Conference
- Record: 25–6 (13–3 Big Sky)
- Head coach: Bobby Dye (5th season)
- Assistant coach: Rod Jensen (5th season)
- Home arena: BSU Pavilion

1987–88 Big Sky Conference men's basketball standings
	Conf.				Overall
Team	W		L	PCT	W		L	PCT
Boise State †	13	–	3	.813	24	–	6	.800
Idaho	11	–	5	.688	19	–	11	.633
Montana State	10	–	6	.625	19	–	11	.633
Idaho State	8	–	8	.500	15	–	13	.536
Nevada	8	–	8	.500	15	–	13	.536
Montana	7	–	9	.438	18	–	11	.621
Northern Arizona	7	–	9	.438	10	–	18	.357
Weber State	6	–	10	.375	9	–	21	.300
Eastern Washington	2	–	14	.125	6	–	21	.222
† Conference tournament winner Rankings from AP poll

The 1987–88 Boise State Broncos men's basketball team represented Boise State University during the 1987–88 NCAA Division I men's basketball season. The Broncos were led by fifth-year head coach Bobby Dye and played their home games on campus at the BSU Pavilion in Boise, Idaho.

They finished the regular season at 23–5 overall, with a 13–3 record in the Big Sky Conference, first in the standings. In the conference tournament in Bozeman, Montana, the top-seed Broncos received a bye into the semifinals and defeated Idaho State by 31 points. They met the host, third-seeded Montana State, in the final and won by two points. It was Boise State's first conference tourney title (and NCAA Tournament appearance) in twelve years.

Boise State received the automatic bid to the NCAA tournament, and no other Big Sky members were invited to the tournament or the NIT. The Broncos were the fourteenth seed in the West region and gave third-seeded Michigan a scare in Salt Lake City, as the Wolverines' large lead eroded in the second half; Michigan prevailed by five points.

The Broncos were led on the court by junior guard Chris Childs, who went on to a lengthy professional career, ending with nine years in the NBA.

== Postseason results ==
Date time, TV	Rank^{#}	Opponent^{#}	Result	Record	Site (attendance) city, state
Big Sky tournament
Fri, March 11; 7:00 pm	(1)	vs. (4) Idaho State; Semifinal	W 87–56	24–5	Brick Breeden Fieldhouse (9,027); Bozeman, Montana
Sat, March 12; 7:30 pm	(1)	at (3) Montana State; Final	W 63–61	25–5	Brick Breeden Fieldhouse (9,027); Bozeman, Montana
NCAA tournament
Thu, March 17*; 7:07 pm	(14 W)	vs. (3 W) No. 10 Michigan; First round	L 58–63	25–6	Jon M. Huntsman Center (11,957); Salt Lake City, Utah
*Non-conference game. ^{#}Rankings from AP Poll. (#) Tournament seedings in parentheses. All times are in Mountain time.
