= 1987 Maui Invitational =

1987 Maui Invitational Tournament
- Season: 1987–98
- Teams: 8
- Finals site: Lahaina Civic Center; Maui, Hawaii
- Champions: Iowa (1st title)
- Runner-up: Villanova (1st title game)
- Semifinalists: Illinois; Kansas
- Winning coach: Tom Davis (1st title)
- MVP: Entire Team (Iowa)

The 1987 Maui Invitational Tournament was an early-season college basketball tournament that was played, for the 4th time, from November 27 to November 29, 1987. The tournament, which began in 1984, was part of the 1987-88 NCAA Division I men's basketball season. The tournament was played at the Lahaina Civic Center in Maui, Hawaii and was won by the Iowa Hawkeyes. It was the first title for the program and its head coach Tom Davis.

== Bracket ==
5th Place Game; Sunday, November 29
Stanford	69
Baylor	56
7th Place Game
Chaminade	75
Nebraska	76

Consolation 2nd Round; Saturday, November 28
Chaminade	82
Stanford	93
Baylor	82
Nebraska	79

First Round; Friday, November 27
Chaminade	62
7	Kansas	89
Stanford	75
11	Iowa	78
Baylor	50
Illinois	73
Nebraska	53
Villanova	70

Semifinals; Saturday, November 28
7	Kansas	81
11	Iowa	100
Illinois	76
Villanova	78

Championship; Sunday, November 29
11	Iowa	97
Villanova	74
3rd Place Game
7	Kansas	75
Illinois	81
