= 1987–88 Michigan State Spartans men's basketball team =

American college basketball season

1987–88 Michigan State Spartans men's basketball
- Conference: Big Ten Conference
- Record: 10–18 (5–13 Big Ten)
- Head coach: Jud Heathcote (12th season)
- Assistant coaches: Tom Izzo; Herb Williams; Jim Boylan
- Captains: George Papadakos; Carlton Valentine; Ed Wright
- Home arena: Jenison Fieldhouse

1987–88 Big Ten Conference men's basketball standings
	Conf.				Overall
Team	W		L	PCT	W		L	PCT
No. 3 Purdue	16	–	2	.889	29	–	4	.879
No. 10 Michigan	13	–	5	.722	26	–	8	.765
No. 17 Iowa	12	–	6	.667	24	–	10	.706
No. 16 Illinois	12	–	6	.667	23	–	10	.697
Indiana	11	–	7	.611	19	–	10	.655
Ohio State	9	–	9	.500	20	–	13	.606
Wisconsin	6	–	12	.333	12	–	16	.429
Michigan State	5	–	13	.278	10	–	18	.357
Minnesota	4	–	14	.222	10	–	18	.357
Northwestern	2	–	16	.111	7	–	21	.250
Rankings from AP Poll

The 1987–88 Michigan State Spartans men's basketball team represented Michigan State University in the 1987–88 NCAA Division I men's basketball season. The team played their home games at Jenison Field House in East Lansing, Michigan and were members of the Big Ten Conference. They were coached by Jud Heathcote in his 12th year at Michigan State. The Spartans finished with an overall record of 10–18, 5–13 to finish in eighth place in Big Ten play.

== Previous season ==
The Spartans finished the 1987–88 season with an overall record of 11–17, 6–12 to finish in seventh place in Big Ten play.

== Roster and statistics ==
1987–88 Michigan State Spartans men's basketball team
No	Name	Pos	Year	Height	Pts	Reb	Ast
45	Carlton Valentine	F	SR	6–5	13.3	5.6	1.5
20	Ken Redfield	F	SO	6–7	11.7	5.1	2.3
21	Steve Smith	G/F	FR	6–6	10.7	4.0	2.9
41	George Papadakos	C	SR	7–0	10.1	5.7	0.6
35	Ed Wright	G/F	SR	6–6	6.2	1.8	3.3
10	Kirk Manns	G	SO	6–1	5.0	4.0	0.5
24	Todd Wolfe	G	JR	6–5	4.4	2.1	0.8
43	Bobby Worthington	F	SR	6–7	4.0	4.1	0.5
23	Jesse Hall	G	FR	6–3	3.3	0.6	0.8
44	Scott Sekal	F	SR	6–8	1.5	0.2	0.1
22	Andre Rison	G	JR	6–0	1.3	0.9	2.3
55	Mario Izzo	C	SR	6–11	1.0	0.0	0.0
34	David Mueller	F/C	SO	6–9	0.5	1.0	0.2
30	Jim Sarkine	F	SR	6–9	0.0	0.3	0.0

== Schedule and results ==
Date time, TV	Rank^{#}	Opponent^{#}	Result	Record	Site city, state
Non-conference regular season
Nov 27, 1987*		Detroit Mercy	W 65–63	1–0	Jenison Field House; East Lansing, MI
Dec 2, 1987*		Maine	W 87–44	2–0	Jenison Field House; East Lansing, MI
Dec 5, 1987*		George Washington	L 64–65	2–1	Jenison Field House; East Lansing, MI
Dec 12, 1987*		TCU	W 69–52	3–1	Jenison Field House; East Lansing, MI
Dec 15, 1987*		Illinois-Chicago	W 78–64	4–1	Jenison Field House; East Lansing, MI
Dec 17, 1987*		at Eastern Michigan	L 80–84 ^{OT}	4–2	Bowen Field House; Ypsilanti, MI
Dec 19, 1987*		at Austin Peay	L 77–85	4–3	Winfield Dunn Center; Clarksville, TN
Dec 22, 1987*		San Jose State	W 82–68	5–3	Jenison Field House; East Lansing, MI
Dec 29, 1987*		at No. 1 Arizona; Fiesta Basketball Classic semifinals	L 58–78	5–4	McKale Center; Tucson, AZ
Dec 30, 1987*		vs. No. 8 Florida; Fiesta Basketball Classic third place game	L 59–83	5–5	McKale Center; Tucson, AZ
Big Ten regular season
Jan 7, 1988		at Wisconsin	L 72–78 ^{2OT}	5–6 (0–1)	Wisconsin Field House (6,743); Madison, WI
Jan 9, 1988		at No. 19 Illinois	L 62–77	5–7 (0–2)	Assembly Hall; Champaign, IL
Jan 14, 1988		No. 10 Michigan; Rivlary	L 72–90	5–8 (0–3)	Jenison Field House; East Lansing, MI
Jan 16, 1988		No. 15 Indiana	W 75–74 ^{OT}	6–8 (1–3)	Jenison Field House; East Lansing, MI
Jan 20, 1988		at No. 5 Purdue	L 67–68	6–9 (1–4)	Mackey Arena; West Lafayette, IN
Jan 27, 1988		Minnesota	L 56–59	6–10 (1–5)	Jenison Field House; East Lansing, MI
Feb 1, 1988		Ohio State	W 76–64	7–10 (2–5)	Jenison Field House; East Lansing, MI
Feb 4, 1988		at Northwestern	W 65–64	8–10 (3–5)	Welsh-Ryan Arena; Evanston, IL
Feb 6, 1988		at No. 13 Iowa	L 77–101	8–11 (3–6)	Carver-Hawkeye Arena (15,500); Iowa City, IA
Feb 10, 1988		No. 2 Purdue	L 70–72	8–12 (3–7)	Jenison Field House; East Lansing, MI
Feb 13, 1988		Illinois	L 65–83	8–13 (3–8)	Jenison Field House; East Lansing, MI
Feb 18, 1988		at Indiana	L 58–95	8–14 (3–9)	Assembly Hall; Bloomington, IN
Feb 22, 1988		at No. 10 Michigan; Rivalry	L 67–77	8–15 (3–10)	Crisler Arena; Ann Arbor, MI
Feb 27, 1988		at Ohio State	W 78–77	9–15 (4–10)	St. John Arena; Columbus, OH
Mar 3, 1988		No. 11 Iowa	L 87–103	9–16 (4–11)	Jenison Field House (8,777); East Lansing, MI
Mar 5, 1988		at Minnesota	L 61–62	9–17 (4–12)	Williams Arena; Minneapolis, MN
Mar 10, 1988		Northwestern	W 55–53	10–17 (5–12)	Jenison Field House; East Lansing, MI
Mar 12, 1988		Wisconsin	L 69–71	10–18 (5–13)	Jenison Field House (8,158); East Lansing, MI
*Non-conference game. ^{#}Rankings from AP Poll,. (#) Tournament seedings in parentheses. All times are in Central Time.
