= 1988 West Coast Athletic Conference men's basketball tournament =

Basketball tournament held in March 1988

- Classification: Division I
- Season: 1987–88
- Teams: 8
- Site: Toso Pavilion; Santa Clara, CA
- Champions: Loyola Marymount (1st title)
- Winning coach: Paul Westhead (1st title)
- MVP: Hank Gathers (Loyola Marymount)
- West Coast Athletic Conference men's basketball tournaments

1987–88 West Coast Athletic Conference men's basketball standings
	Conf.				Overall
Team	W		L	PCT	W		L	PCT
No. 15 Loyola Marymount †	14	–	0	1.000	28	–	4	.875
Saint Mary's	9	–	5	.643	19	–	9	.679
Santa Clara	9	–	5	.643	20	–	11	.645
Pepperdine	8	–	6	.571	17	–	13	.567
Gonzaga	7	–	7	.500	16	–	12	.571
San Francisco	5	–	9	.357	13	–	15	.464
San Diego	3	–	11	.214	11	–	17	.393
Portland	1	–	13	.071	6	–	22	.214
† Conference tournament winner Rankings from AP poll

The 1988 West Coast Athletic Conference men's basketball tournament was held March 5–7 at the Toso Pavilion (now Leavey Center) on the campus of Santa Clara University in Santa Clara, California. This was the second edition of the tournament; it included all eight teams and all seven games were held at the same site.

Regular season champion Loyola Marymount defeated tournament host and #3 seed Santa Clara 104–96 in the final to win their first WCAC (now WCC) tournament championship.

The Lions earned the automatic bid to the 64-team NCAA tournament and were seeded tenth in the West regional. Sent to Salt Lake City, they outscored Wyoming 119–115, but were stopped 123–97 by second-seeded North Carolina.

== Bracket ==
Quarterfinals; Saturday, March 5
1	#18 Loyola Marymount	110
8	San Diego	104
5	Gonzaga	70
4	Pepperdine	81
3	Santa Clara	90
6	San Francisco	88
7	Portland	48
2	Saint Mary's	68

Semifinals; Sunday, March 6
1	#18 Loyola Marymount	109
4	Pepperdine	106
3	Santa Clara	69
2	Saint Mary's	62

Championship; Monday, March 7
1	#18 Loyola Marymount	104
3	Santa Clara	96

== Notes ==
- The tournament champion, Loyola Marymount, scored over 100 points in all three games (San Diego: 110–104, Pepperdine: 109–106, Santa Clara: 104–96) for a total of 323 points.
