= Jeff Moe =

American basketball player (born 1966)

Personal information
- Born: May 19, 1966 (age 60) Indianapolis, Indiana, U.S.
- Listed height: 6 ft 4 in (1.93 m)
- Listed weight: 195 lb (88 kg)

Career information
- High school: Brebeuf Jesuit (Indianapolis, Indiana)
- College: Iowa (1984–1988)
- NBA draft: 1988: 2nd round, 42nd overall pick
- Drafted by: Utah Jazz
- Position: Shooting guard
- Number: 20

Career history
- 1988: Cedar Rapids Silver Bullets
- Stats at Basketball Reference

Jeffrey J. Moe (born May 19, 1966) is an American former professional basketball player. He played in the Continental Basketball Association for the Cedar Rapids Silver Bullets during the first part of the 1988–89 season before being released in late December 1988. Moe played collegiately at the University of Iowa from 1984 to 1988 before being selected in the 1988 NBA draft.

== Basketball career ==
After graduating from Brebeuf Jesuit in Indianapolis, Indiana, Moe attended the University of Iowa. At Iowa, Moe averaged 11.1 points as a junior (1986–1987) and 12.9 as a senior (1987–1988), as the Hawkeyes went 30–5 and 23–10 in those two seasons.

Moe was drafted in the second round (42nd overall) by the Utah Jazz, but never appeared in an NBA game. Playing in 14 games for the Silver Bullets, Moe scored 75 points, an average of 5.35 per game. After his brief professional basketball career, Moe became a real estate executive in Indiana.
