= 1987–88 Purdue Boilermakers men's basketball team =

American college basketball season

1987–88 Purdue Boilermakers men's basketball

Big Ten Champions

1988 NCAA Division I men's basketball tournament, Sweet Sixteen
- Conference: Big Ten Conference

Ranking
- Coaches: No. 4
- AP: No. 3
- Record: 29–4 (16–2 Big Ten)
- Head coach: Gene Keady (8th season)
- Assistant coaches: Bruce Weber (8th season); Kevin Stallings (6th season); Tom Reiter (2nd season)
- Home arena: Mackey Arena

1987–88 Big Ten Conference men's basketball standings
	Conf.				Overall
Team	W		L	PCT	W		L	PCT
No. 3 Purdue	16	–	2	.889	29	–	4	.879
No. 10 Michigan	13	–	5	.722	26	–	8	.765
No. 17 Iowa	12	–	6	.667	24	–	10	.706
No. 16 Illinois	12	–	6	.667	23	–	10	.697
Indiana	11	–	7	.611	19	–	10	.655
Ohio State	9	–	9	.500	20	–	13	.606
Wisconsin	6	–	12	.333	12	–	16	.429
Michigan State	5	–	13	.278	10	–	18	.357
Minnesota	4	–	14	.222	10	–	18	.357
Northwestern	2	–	16	.111	7	–	21	.250
Rankings from AP Poll

The 1987–88 Purdue Boilermakers men's basketball team represented Purdue University during the 1987–88 college basketball season. Led by head coach Gene Keady, the team won the Big Ten Conference championship by a 3-game margin. The Boilermakers earned the No. 1 seed in the Midwest Region of the NCAA tournament and advanced to the Sweet 16, finishing the season with a 29–4 record (16–2 Big Ten).

== Roster ==
1987–88 Purdue Boilermakers men's basketball team
Players
Coaches

Pos.	#	Name	Height	Weight	Year	Hometown
G	21	Everette Stephens	6 ft 2 in (1.88 m)	175 lb (79 kg)	Sr	Evanston, Illinois
G	23	Troy Lewis	6 ft 7 in (2.01 m)	205 lb (93 kg)	Sr	Toledo, Ohio
G	25	Tony Jones	6 ft 3 in (1.91 m)	—	So	Ft. Wayne, Indiana
F	30	Kip Jones	6 ft 8 in (2.03 m)	—	Jr
F	33	Todd Mitchell	6 ft 4 in (1.93 m)	190 lb (86 kg)	Sr	Anderson, Indiana
F	35	Mel McCants	6 ft 8 in (2.03 m)	240 lb (109 kg)	Jr	Chicago, Illinois
F/C	55	Steve Scheffler	6 ft 9 in (2.06 m)	250 lb (113 kg)	So	Grand Rapids, Michigan

Head coach

- Gene Keady (Kansas State)

Assistant coach(es)

- Bruce Weber (Milwaukee)
- Kevin Stallings (Purdue)
- Tom Reiter

Legend

- (C) Team captain
- (S) Suspended
- (I) Ineligible
- (W) Walk-on
- Injured
- Current redshirt

== Schedule and results ==
Date time, TV	Rank^{#}	Opponent^{#}	Result	Record	Site city, state
Non-Conference Regular Season
Nov 20, 1987*	No. 2	Arkansas–Little Rock	W 102–88	1–0	Mackey Arena; West Lafayette, IN
Nov 24, 1987*; 6:30 pm, Score	No. 2	Iowa State; Big Apple NIT	L 96–104	1–1	Mackey Arena; West Lafayette, IN
Nov 30, 1987*; 8:00 pm	No. 2	at Illinois State	W 68–61	2–1	Horton Field House (6,942); Normal, IL
Dec 3, 1987*	No. 11	at Wichita State	W 80–78	3–1	Levitt Arena; Wichita, KS
Dec 5, 1987*	No. 11	Oregon	W 88–62	4–1	Mackey Arena; West Lafayette, IN
Dec 7, 1987*	No. 11	Colorado	W 72–54	5–1	Mackey Arena; West Lafayette, IN
Dec 12, 1987*	No. 13	Ball State	W 96–47	6–1	Mackey Arena; West Lafayette, IN
Dec 20, 1987*	No. 12	Kansas State	W 101–72	7–1	Mackey Arena (14,123); West Lafayette, IN
Dec 22, 1987*	No. 10	Texas Tech	W 82–59	8–1	Mackey Arena; West Lafayette, IN
Dec 29, 1987*	No. 11	vs. Wake Forest; Palm Beach Classic	W 81–73	9–1	West Palm Beach, FL
Dec 30, 1987*	No. 11	vs. Miami (FL); Palm Beach Classic	W 110–82	10–1	West Palm Beach, FL
Big Ten Regular Season
Jan 4, 1988	No. 11	at Illinois	W 81–68	11–1 (1–0)	Assembly Hall (16,654); Champaign, IL
Jan 7, 1988	No. 10	Ohio State	W 84–77	12–1 (2–0)	Mackey Arena; West Lafayette, IN
Jan 9, 1988	No. 10	No. 16 Iowa	W 80–79	13–1 (3–0)	Mackey Arena; West Lafayette, IN
Jan 14, 1988	No. 8	Northwestern	W 80–64	14–1 (4–0)	Mackey Arena; West Lafayette, IN
Jan 16, 1988	No. 8	at Minnesota	W 82–74	15–1 (5–0)	Williams Arena; Minneapolis, MN
Jan 20, 1988	No. 5	Michigan State	W 78–67	16–1 (6–0)	Mackey Arena; West Lafayette, IN
Jan 23, 1988*	No. 5	at Louisville	W 91–85	17–1	Freedom Hall; Louisville, KY
Jan 30, 1988	No. 2	at Indiana	L 79–82	17–2 (6–1)	Assembly Hall; Bloomington, IN
Feb 3, 1988	No. 6	Wisconsin	W 86–62	18–2 (7–1)	Mackey Arena (14,123); West Lafayette, IN
Feb 7, 1988	No. 6	at No. 11 Michigan	W 91–87	19–2 (8–1)	Crisler Arena; Ann Arbor, MI
Feb 10, 1988	No. 2	at Michigan State	W 72–70	20–2 (9–1)	Jenison Fieldhouse; East Lansing, MI
Feb 15, 1988; ESPN	No. 2	at No. 13 Iowa	W 73–68	21–2 (10–1)	Carver-Hawkeye Arena (15,500); Iowa City, IA
Feb 21, 1988	No. 2	Indiana	W 95–85	22–2 (11–1)	Mackey Arena; West Lafayette, IN
Feb 25, 1988	No. 2	Illinois	W 93–79	23–2 (12–1)	Mackey Arena (14,123); West Lafayette, IN
Feb 27, 1988	No. 2	at Northwestern	W 69–51	24–2 (13–1)	Welsh-Ryan Arena; Evanston, IL
Mar 3, 1988	No. 2	at Wisconsin	W 84–56	25–2 (14–1)	Wisconsin Field House (8,496); Madison, WI
Mar 5, 1988	No. 2	No. 10 Michigan	W 80–67	26–2 (15–1)	Mackey Arena; West Lafayette, IN
Mar 9, 1988	No. 2	at Ohio State	L 60–71	26–3 (15–2)	St. John Arena; Columbus, OH
Mar 12, 1988	No. 2	Minnesota	W 93–66	27–3 (16–2)	Mackey Arena; West Lafayette, IN
NCAA Tournament
Mar 17, 1988*; CBS	(1) No. 3	vs. (16) Fairleigh Dickinson; NCAA tournament First Round	W 94–79	28–3	Edmund P. Joyce Center; South Bend, IN
Mar 19, 1988*; CBS	(1) No. 3	vs. (9) Memphis State; NCAA Tournament Second Round	W 100–73	29–3	Edmund P. Joyce Center; South Bend, IN
Mar 25, 1988*; CBS	No. 3	vs. No. 20 Kansas State; NCAA Tournament Sweet Sixteen	L 70–73	29–4	Pontiac Silverdome (31,309); Pontiac, MI
*Non-conference game. ^{#}Rankings from AP Poll. (#) Tournament seedings in parentheses.

=== NCAA basketball tournament ===
During the 1988 NCAA Division I men's basketball tournament, Purdue qualified for the Sweet Sixteen, where they lost to Kansas State.

- Midwest
  - Purdue (#1 seed) 94, Fairleigh Dickinson (#16 seed) 79
  - Purdue 100, Memphis (#9 seed) 73
  - Kansas State (#4 seed) 73, Purdue 70

== Awards and honors ==
- Gene Keady – Big Ten Coach of the Year

== Team players drafted into the NBA ==
Round	Pick	Player	NBA club
2	31	Everette Stephens	Philadelphia 76ers
2	43	Todd Mitchell	Denver Nuggets
