= 1987–88 Gonzaga Bulldogs men's basketball team =

American college basketball season

1987–88 Gonzaga Bulldogs men's basketball
- Conference: West Coast Athletic Conference
- Record: 16–12 (7–7 WCAC)
- Head coach: Dan Fitzgerald (6th season)
- Home arena: Martin Centre

1987–88 West Coast Athletic Conference men's basketball standings
	Conf.				Overall
Team	W		L	PCT	W		L	PCT
No. 15 Loyola Marymount †	14	–	0	1.000	28	–	4	.875
Saint Mary's	9	–	5	.643	19	–	9	.679
Santa Clara	9	–	5	.643	20	–	11	.645
Pepperdine	8	–	6	.571	17	–	13	.567
Gonzaga	7	–	7	.500	16	–	12	.571
San Francisco	5	–	9	.357	13	–	15	.464
San Diego	3	–	11	.214	11	–	17	.393
Portland	1	–	13	.071	6	–	22	.214
† Conference tournament winner Rankings from AP poll

The 1987–88 Gonzaga Bulldogs men's basketball team represented Gonzaga University in the West Coast Athletic Conference (WCAC) during the 1987–88 NCAA Division I men's basketball season. Led by sixth-year head coach Dan Fitzgerald, the Bulldogs were 16–11 (.593) overall in the regular season (7–7 in WCAC, 5th), and played their home games on campus at the Charlotte Y. Martin Centre (formerly known as Kennedy Pavilion) in Spokane, Washington.

At the second conference tournament, the Zags lost again to Pepperdine in the quarterfinals to finish at 16–12 (.571). Their first tournament wins came four years later in 1992; they advanced to the final, but fell by three to the top-seeded Waves.

== Postseason results ==
Date time, TV	Rank^{#}	Opponent^{#}	Result	Record	Site (attendance) city, state
WCAC tournament
Sat, March 5; 8:30 pm	(5)	vs. (4) Pepperdine; Quarterfinal	L 70–81	16–12	Toso Pavilion; Santa Clara, California
*Non-conference game. ^{#}Rankings from AP poll. (#) Tournament seedings in parentheses. All times are in Pacific time.
