= 1988 Big South Conference men's basketball tournament =

- Classification: Division I
- Season: 1987–88
- Teams: 7
- Site: Winthrop Coliseum; Rock Hill, SC
- Champions: Winthrop (1st title)
- Winning coach: Steve Vacendak (1st title)
- MVP: John Weiss (Winthrop)

1987–88 Big South Conference men's basketball standings
	Conf.				Overall
Team	W		L	PCT	W		L	PCT
Coastal Carolina	9	–	3	.750	17	–	11	.607
Baptist	8	–	4	.667	17	–	12	.586
Radford	8	–	4	.667	16	–	14	.533
Winthrop †	5	–	7	.417	17	–	13	.567
UNC Asheville	5	–	7	.417	13	–	15	.464
Augusta State	4	–	8	.333	8	–	18	.308
Campbell	3	–	9	.250	11	–	16	.407
† 1988 Big South tournament winner Rankings from AP Poll

The 1988 Big South Conference men's basketball tournament took place March 3–5, 1988, at the Winthrop Coliseum in Rock Hill, South Carolina. For the first time in their school history, the Winthrop Eagles won the tournament, led by head coach Steve Vacendak.

== Format ==
All of the conference's seven members participated in the tournament, hosted at the Winthrop Coliseum, home of the Winthrop Eagles. Teams were seeded by conference winning percentage.

== Bracket ==
Quarterfinals; March 3
4	Winthrop	63
5	UNC Asheville	58
2	Baptist College	69
7	Campbell	61
3	Radford	96
6	Augusta State	82

Semifinals; March 4
1	Coastal Carolina	40
4	Winthrop	75
2	Charleston Southern	82
3	Radford	91*

Finals; March 5
3	Radford	56
4	Winthrop	71

* Asterisk indicates overtime game

- Source

== All-Tournament Team ==
- John Weiss, Winthrop
- Shaun Wise, Winthrop
- Greg Washington, Winthrop
- Aswan Wainright, Radford
- Oliver Johnson, Charleston Southern
- Heder Ambroise, Charleston Southern
