= 1987–88 Indiana Hoosiers men's basketball team =

American college basketball season

1987–88 Indiana Hoosiers men's basketball

NCAA men's Division I tournament, Round of 64
- Conference: Big Ten Conference

Ranking
- Coaches: No. 19
- Record: 19–10 (11–7 Big Ten)
- Head coach: Bobby Knight (17th season)
- Captains: Steve Eyl; Dean Garrett; Keith Smart
- Home arena: Assembly Hall

1987–88 Big Ten Conference men's basketball standings
	Conf.				Overall
Team	W		L	PCT	W		L	PCT
No. 3 Purdue	16	–	2	.889	29	–	4	.879
No. 10 Michigan	13	–	5	.722	26	–	8	.765
No. 17 Iowa	12	–	6	.667	24	–	10	.706
No. 16 Illinois	12	–	6	.667	23	–	10	.697
Indiana	11	–	7	.611	19	–	10	.655
Ohio State	9	–	9	.500	20	–	13	.606
Wisconsin	6	–	12	.333	12	–	16	.429
Michigan State	5	–	13	.278	10	–	18	.357
Minnesota	4	–	14	.222	10	–	18	.357
Northwestern	2	–	16	.111	7	–	21	.250
Rankings from AP Poll

The 1987–88 Indiana Hoosiers men's basketball team represented Indiana University. Their head coach was Bobby Knight, who was in his 17th year. The team played its home games in Assembly Hall in Bloomington, Indiana, and was a member of the Big Ten Conference.

The Hoosiers finished the regular season with an overall record of 19–10 and a conference record of 11–7, finishing 5th in the Big Ten Conference. The Hoosiers were invited to participate in the 1988 NCAA Tournament as a 4-seed; however, IU made a quick exit with a first-round loss to 13-seed Richmond.

== Roster ==
No.	Name	Position	Ht.	Year	Hometown
3	Jay Edwards	G/F	6–4	Fr.	Marion, Indiana
4	Lyndon Jones	G	6–2	Fr.	Marion, Indiana
10	Mark Robinson	F	6–5	RS Jr.	Van Nuys, California
11	Todd Jadlow	F/C	6–9	Jr.	Salina, Kansas
14	Magnus Pelkowski	C	6–10	Jr.	Bogotá, Colombia
20	Ricky Calloway	G/F	6–6	Jr.	Cincinnati, Ohio
22	Dean Garrett	C	6–10	Sr.	San Clemente, California
23	Keith Smart	G	6–1	Sr.	Baton Rouge, Louisiana
32	Steve Eyl	F	6–6	Sr.	Hamilton, Ohio
35	Jeff Oliphant	G	6–5	So.	Lyons, Indiana
42	Kreigh Smith	G/F	6–7	Jr.	Tipton, Indiana
44	Joe Hillman	G	6–2	Jr.	Glendale, California
45	Brian Sloan	F/C	6–8	Jr.	McLeansboro, Illinois

== Schedule/results ==
Date time, TV	Rank^{#}	Opponent^{#}	Result	Record	Site city, state
Non-conference regular season
11/28/1987*	No. 6	Miami (OH)	W 90–65	1–0	Assembly Hall; Bloomington, Indiana
12/1/1987*	No. 5	Notre Dame	W 76–59	2–0	Assembly Hall; Bloomington, Indiana
12/5/1987*	No. 5	vs. No. 2 Kentucky; Indiana–Kentucky rivalry	L 76–82	2–1	Hoosier Dome; Indianapolis
12/8/1987*	No. 6	Vanderbilt	W 63–61	3–1	Assembly Hall; Bloomington, Indiana
12/11/1987*	No. 6	James Madison; Indiana Classic	W 84–52	4–1	Assembly Hall; Bloomington, Indiana
12/12/1987*	No. 6	Washington State; Indiana Classic	W 63–56	5–1	Assembly Hall; Bloomington, Indiana
12/15/1987*	No. 5	Eastern Kentucky	W 103–75	6–1	Assembly Hall; Bloomington, Indiana
12/19/1987*	No. 5	at Louisville	L 69–81	6–2	Freedom Hall; Louisville, Kentucky
12/28/1987*	No. 13	vs. Pennsylvania; Hoosier Classic	W 94–54	7–2	Market Square Arena; Indianapolis
12/29/1987*	No. 13	vs. Stanford; Hoosier Classic	W 83–73	8–2	Market Square Arena; Indianapolis
Big Ten regular season
1/6/1988	No. 12	at No. 16 Iowa	L 70–84	8–3 (0–1)	Carver–Hawkeye Arena; Iowa City, Iowa
1/11/1988	No. 12	at Northwestern	L 64–66	8–4 (0–2)	Welsh-Ryan Arena; Evanston, Illinois
1/14/1988	No. 15	Wisconsin	W 55–53	9–4 (1–2)	Assembly Hall (15,230); Bloomington, Indiana
1/16/1988	No. 15	at Michigan State	L 74–75	9–5 (1–3)	Jenison Fieldhouse; East Lansing, Michigan
1/24/1988		No. 7 Michigan	L 60–72	9–6 (1–4)	Assembly Hall; Bloomington, Indiana
1/27/1988		at Ohio State	W 75–71	10–6 (2–4)	St. John Arena; Columbus, Ohio
1/30/1988		No. 2 Purdue; Rivalry	W 82–79	11–6 (3–4)	Assembly Hall; Bloomington, Indiana
2/4/1988		Minnesota	W 92–63	12–6 (4–4)	Assembly Hall; Bloomington, Indiana
2/6/1988		at Illinois; Rivalry	W 75–74	13–6 (5–4)	Assembly Hall; Champaign, Illinois
2/11/1988	No. 19	Northwestern	W 74–45	14–6 (6–4)	Assembly Hall; Bloomington, Indiana
2/13/1988	No. 19	at Michigan	L 72–92	14–7 (6–5)	Crisler Arena; Ann Arbor, Michigan
2/18/1988		Michigan State	W 95–58	15–7 (7–5)	Assembly Hall; Bloomington, Indiana
2/21/1988		at Purdue; Rivalry	L 85–95	15–8 (7–6)	Mackey Arena; West Lafayette, Indiana
2/24/1988		at Wisconsin	W 84–74	16–8 (8–6)	Wisconsin Field House (9,229); Madison, Wisconsin
2/29/1988		Illinois; Rivalry	L 65–75	16–9 (8–7)	Assembly Hall; Bloomington, Indiana
3/5/1988		Ohio State	W 85–77	17–9 (9–7)	Assembly Hall; Bloomington, Indiana
3/10/1988		at Minnesota	W 91–85	18–9 (10–7)	Williams Arena; Minneapolis
3/12/1988		No. 15 Iowa	W 116–89	19–9 (11–7)	Assembly Hall; Bloomington, Indiana
NCAA Tournament
3/18/1988*	No. (4)	vs. No. (13) Richmond; First Round	L 69–72	19–10 (11–7)	Hartford Civic Center; Hartford, Connecticut
*Non-conference game. ^{#}Rankings from AP Poll. (#) Tournament seedings in parentheses.
