= 1987–88 Illinois Fighting Illini men's basketball team =

American college basketball season

1987–88 Illinois Fighting Illini men's basketball

Illini Classic, Champion

NCAA men's Division I tournament, second round
- Conference: Big Ten Conference

Ranking
- Coaches: No. 17
- AP: No. 16
- Record: 23–10 (12–6 Big Ten)
- Head coach: Lou Henson (13th season)
- Assistant coaches: Dick Nagy (9th season); Jimmy Collins (5th season); Mark Coomes (3rd season)
- MVPs: Nick Anderson; Kenny Battle
- Captains: Glynn Blackwell; Jens Kujawa
- Home arena: Assembly Hall

1987–88 Big Ten Conference men's basketball standings
	Conf.				Overall
Team	W		L	PCT	W		L	PCT
No. 3 Purdue	16	–	2	.889	29	–	4	.879
No. 10 Michigan	13	–	5	.722	26	–	8	.765
No. 17 Iowa	12	–	6	.667	24	–	10	.706
No. 16 Illinois	12	–	6	.667	23	–	10	.697
Indiana	11	–	7	.611	19	–	10	.655
Ohio State	9	–	9	.500	20	–	13	.606
Wisconsin	6	–	12	.333	12	–	16	.429
Michigan State	5	–	13	.278	10	–	18	.357
Minnesota	4	–	14	.222	10	–	18	.357
Northwestern	2	–	16	.111	7	–	21	.250
Rankings from AP Poll

The 1987–88 Illinois Fighting Illini men's basketball team represented the University of Illinois.

== Regular season ==
The 1987–88 season brought Lou Henson his 500th career victory and laid the foundation for the history making season in 1988–1989.

=== Roster ===
1987–88 Illinois Fighting Illini men's basketball team
Players
Coaches

Pos.	#	Name	Height	Weight	Year	Previous school	Hometown
G	11	Travis Smith	5 ft 11 in (1.8 m)	175 lb (79 kg)	Fr	Ridgway High School	Ridgway, Illinois
G	13	Kendall Gill	6 ft 4 in (1.93 m)	180 lb (82 kg)	So	Rich Central High School	Matteson, Illinois
G	15	Mark Shapland	6 ft 1 in (1.85 m)	190 lb (86 kg)	Jr	Monticello High School	Monticello, Illinois
G	21	Glynn Blackwell (C)	6 ft 4 in (1.93 m)	180 lb (82 kg)	Sr	Highland Park Community High School	Highland Park, Michigan
G	23	Larry Smith	6 ft 2 in (1.88 m)	185 lb (84 kg)	So	Alton High School	Alton, Illinois
F	24	Ervin Small	6 ft 7 in (2.01 m)	200 lb (91 kg)	So	Simeon High School	Chicago, Illinois
G/F	25	Nick Anderson	6 ft 6 in (1.98 m)	215 lb (98 kg)	So	Simeon High School	Chicago, Illinois
G	30	Eddie Manzke	6 ft 2 in (1.88 m)	170 lb (77 kg)	Jr	Marist High School	Orland Park, Illinois
F	32	Bob Starnes (redshirt)	6 ft 4 in (1.93 m)	180 lb (82 kg)	Fr	St. Thomas Aquinas High School	Ft. Lauderdale, Florida
F	33	Kenny Battle	6 ft 5 in (1.96 m)	210 lb (95 kg)	RS Jr	West Aurora High School	Aurora, Illinois
G/F	35	Stephen Bardo	6 ft 5 in (1.96 m)	200 lb (91 kg)	So	Carbondale Community High School	Carbondale, Illinois
F	40	Mike MacDonald	6 ft 6 in (1.98 m)	210 lb (95 kg)	Jr	Streamwood High School	Streamwood, Illinois
F	44	Phil Kunz	6 ft 9 in (2.06 m)	230 lb (104 kg)	So	Carlyle High School	Carlyle, Illinois
F	45	Lowell Hamilton	6 ft 7 in (2.01 m)	210 lb (95 kg)	Jr	Providence St. Mel High School	Chicago, Illinois
F/C	50	Bryan Brickner	6 ft 6 in (1.98 m)	180 lb (82 kg)	So	Scales Mound High School	Scales Mound, Illinois
C	54	Jens Kujawa (C)	7 ft 0 in (2.13 m)	245 lb (111 kg)	RS Jr	Taylorville High School	Braunschweig, West Germany

Head coach

- Lou Henson (New Mexico State University) (13th year)

Assistant coach(es)

- Jimmy Collins (New Mexico State) (5th year)
- Dick Nagy (Hardin-Simmons University) (9th year)
- Mark Coomes (New Mexico State) (3rd year)

Legend

- (C) Team captain
- (S) Suspended
- (I) Ineligible
- (W) Walk-on
- Injured
- Current redshirt

Roster

== Schedule ==
Date time, TV	Rank^{#}	Opponent^{#}	Result	Record	Site (attendance) city, state
Non-Conference regular season
11/27/1987*		vs. Baylor; Maui Invitational	W 73-50	1-0	Lahaina Civic Center (1,200); Maui, HI
11/28/1987*		vs. Villanova; Maui Invitational	L 76-78	1-1	Lahaina Civic Center (1,200); Maui, HI
11/29/1987*		vs. No. 7 Kansas; Maui Invitational	W 81-75	2-1	Lahaina Civic Center (1,000); Maui, HI
12/2/1987*		Chicago State	W 86-57	3-1	Assembly Hall (13,486); Champaign, IL
12/5/1987*		Mississippi Valley State	W 111-73	4-1	Assembly Hall (14,354); Champaign
12/8/1987*		Austin Peay	W 100-62	5-1	Assembly Hall (14,519); Champaign
12/11/1987*		Illinois-Chicago; Illini Classic	W 109-53	6-1	Assembly Hall (13,653); Champaign, IL
12/12/1987*		Auburn; Illini Classic	W 107-103 ^{ot}	7-1	Assembly Hall (14,847); Champaign, IL
12/19/1987*		North Carolina	L 74-85	7-2	Assembly Hall (16,712); Champaign, IL
12/22/1987*		vs. No. 17 Missouri; Braggin' Rights	W 75-63	8-2	St. Louis Arena (18,224); St. Louis, MO
12/30/1987*		at Colorado	W 86-68	9-2	Coors Events Center (8,241); Denver, CO
Big Ten regular season
1/4/1988		No. 11 Purdue	L 68-81	9-3 (0-1)	Assembly Hall (16,654); Champaign, IL
1/7/1988	No. 19	at Minnesota	W 65-61 ^{ot}	10-3 (1-1)	Williams Arena (10,988); Minneapolis, MN
1/9/1988	No. 19	Michigan State	W 77-62	11-3 (2-1)	Assembly Hall (16,616); Champaign, IL
1/16/1988	No. 20	at Wisconsin	W 80-65	12-3 (3-1)	Wisconsin Field House (11,068); Madison, WI
1/17/1988*	No. 20	Tennessee	W 103-79	13-3	Assembly Hall (15,386); Champaign, IL
1/21/1988	No. 13	at No. 19 Iowa; Rivalry	L 79-93	13-4 (3-2)	Carver–Hawkeye Arena (15,500); Iowa City, IA
1/23/1988	No. 13	Northwestern; Rivalry	W 79-48	14-4 (4-2)	Assembly Hall (14,606); Champaign, IL
3/4/1987	No. 13	at No. 8 Michigan	L 64-76	14-5 (4-3)	Crisler Arena (13,609); Ann Arbor, MI
1/30/1988*	No. 13	at No. 1 Arizona	L 70-78	14-6	McKale Center (13,227); Tucson, AZ
2/4/1988	No. 17	at Ohio State	L 60-64	14-7 (4-4)	St. John Arena (13,320); Columbus, OH
2/6/1988	No. 17	No. 3 Indiana; Rivalry	L 74-75	14-8 (4-5)	Assembly Hall (16,671); Champaign, IL
2/11/1988		Minnesota	W 86-50	15-8 (5-5)	Assembly Hall (14,313); Champaign, IL
2/13/1988		at Michigan State	W 83-65	16-8 (6-5)	Jenison Fieldhouse (10,004); East Lansing, MI
2/17/1988		Ohio State	W 118-86	17-8 (7-5)	Assembly Hall (14,587); Champaign, IL
2/21/1988		Wisconsin	W 85-65	18-8 (8-5)	Assembly Hall (16,348); Champaign, IL
2/25/1988		at No. 2 Purdue	L 79-93	18-9 (8-6)	Mackey Arena (14,123); West Lafayette, IN
2/29/1988		at Indiana; Rivalry	W 75-65	19-9 (9-6)	Assembly Hall (16,233); Bloomington, IN
3/6/1988		No. 11 Iowa; Rivalry	W 94-81	20-9 (10-6)	Assembly Hall (16,538); Champaign, IL
3/9/1988	No. 19	Michigan	W 85-74	21-9 (11-6)	Assembly Hall (16,605); Champaign, IL
3/12/1988	No. 19	at Northwestern; Rivalry	W 79-74	22-9 (12-6)	Welsh-Ryan Arena (8,117); Evanston, IL
NCAA Tournament
3/18/1988*	(3 S) No. 16	vs. (14 S) Texas-San Antonio; First Round	W 81-72	23-9	Riverfront Coliseum (16,562); Cincinnati, OH
3/20/1988*	(3 S) No. 16	vs. (6 S) Villanova; Second Round	L 63-66	23-10	Riverfront Coliseum (16,562); Cincinnati, OH
*Non-conference game. ^{#}Rankings from AP Poll. (#) Tournament seedings in parentheses. All times are in Central Time.

== Player stats ==
Player	Games Played	Minutes Played	2 pt. Field Goals	3 pt. Field Goals	Free Throws	Rebounds	Assists	Blocks	Steals	Points
Nick Anderson	33	909	221	2	77	217	53	28	37	525
Kenny Battle	33	1027	197	0	122	183	55	10	72	516
Glynn Blackwell	33	822	143	10	83	111	78	1	40	399
Kendall Gill	33	946	107	21	67	73	138	3	65	344
Lowell Hamilton	33	627	140	1	48	127	9	19	14	331
Stephen Bardo	33	820	77	3	53	138	125	7	41	216
Jens Kujawa	33	719	69	0	38	171	34	29	17	176
Larry Smith	31	403	45	2	41	37	80	1	19	133
Phil Kunz	26	195	16	0	9	41	2	13	3	41
Ervin Small	24	98	10	0	6	36	4	2	1	26
Mark Shapland	6	22	2	0	0	9	1	0	0	4
Bryan Brickner	5	13	0	0	1	1	0	0	0	1
Travis Smith	2	2	0	0	1	1	0	0	0	1
Mike MacDonald	2	4	0	0	1	0	0	0	0	0
Eddie Manzke	6	18	0	0	2	2	0	0	0	0
Bob Starnes	2	4	0	0	0	0	0	0	0	0

== Awards and honors ==
- Kendall Gill
  - Fighting Illini All-Century team (2005)
- Nick Anderson
  - Team Co-Most Valuable Player
  - Fighting Illini All-Century team (2005)
- Kenny Battle
  - Team Co-Most Valuable Player
  - Fighting Illini All-Century team (2005)

== Team players drafted into the NBA ==
Player	NBA club	Round	Pick
