= 1987–88 Iowa Hawkeyes men's basketball team =

American college basketball season

1987–88 Iowa Hawkeyes men's basketball

Maui Invitational Tournament champion Amana-Hawkeye Classic champion

NCAA men's Division I tournament, Sweet Sixteen
- Conference: Big Ten Conference

Ranking
- Coaches: No. 16
- AP: No. 17
- Record: 24–10 (12–6 Big Ten)
- Head coach: Tom Davis (2nd season)
- Assistant coaches: Bruce Pearl; Gary Close; Rudy Washington
- MVPs: B. J. Armstrong; Bill Jones; Roy Marble
- Home arena: Carver-Hawkeye Arena

1987–88 Big Ten Conference men's basketball standings
	Conf.				Overall
Team	W		L	PCT	W		L	PCT
No. 3 Purdue	16	–	2	.889	29	–	4	.879
No. 10 Michigan	13	–	5	.722	26	–	8	.765
No. 17 Iowa	12	–	6	.667	24	–	10	.706
No. 16 Illinois	12	–	6	.667	23	–	10	.697
Indiana	11	–	7	.611	19	–	10	.655
Ohio State	9	–	9	.500	20	–	13	.606
Wisconsin	6	–	12	.333	12	–	16	.429
Michigan State	5	–	13	.278	10	–	18	.357
Minnesota	4	–	14	.222	10	–	18	.357
Northwestern	2	–	16	.111	7	–	21	.250
Rankings from AP Poll

The 1987–88 Iowa Hawkeyes men's basketball team represented the University of Iowa as members of the Big Ten Conference. The team was led by second-year head coach Tom Davis and played their home games at Carver-Hawkeye Arena. They finished the season 24–10 overall and 12–6 in Big Ten play to finish tied for third place. The Hawkeyes received an at-large bid to the NCAA tournament as #5 seed in the West Region. After defeating Florida State in the first round and UNLV in the second round, they lost to #1 seed Arizona in the Sweet Sixteen.

== Roster ==
1987–88 Iowa Hawkeyes men's basketball team
Players
Coaches

Pos.	#	Name	Height	Weight	Year	Hometown
G	3	Kelly Westen	6 ft 2 in (1.88 m)	—		Antigo, Wisconsin
G	10	B. J. Armstrong	6 ft 2 in (1.88 m)	—	Jr	Bloomfield Hills, Michigan
G	11	Michael Reaves	6 ft 3 in (1.91 m)	—	Sr	Milledgeville, Georgia
G	13	Mark Wetzel	—	—		Portland, Oregon
G/F	14	Bill Jones	6 ft 7 in (2.01 m)	—	Sr	Detroit, Michigan
G	15	Rodell Davis	6 ft 3 in (1.91 m)	—	Fr	Thornton, Illinois
G	20	Jeff Moe	6 ft 3 in (1.91 m)	—	Sr	Indianapolis, Indiana
G/F	23	Roy Marble	6 ft 6 in (1.98 m)	—	Jr	Flint, Michigan
G	24	Michael Morgan	6 ft 3 in (1.91 m)	—	Sr	Haughton, Louisiana
F	25	Ed Horton	6 ft 8 in (2.03 m)	—	Jr	Springfield, Illinois
F	32	Mark Jewell	6 ft 9 in (2.06 m)	—	So	Lafayette, Indiana
F	40	Kent Hill	6 ft 6 in (1.98 m)	—	Sr	Wichita, Kansas
F	44	Al Lorenzen	6 ft 9 in (2.06 m)	—	Sr	Cedar Rapids, Iowa
C	51	Les Jepsen	7 ft 0 in (2.13 m)	—	So	Bowbells, North Dakota

Head coach

- Tom Davis (UW–Platteville)

Assistant coach(es)

- Bruce Pearl (Boston College)
- Gary Close (Arizona State)
- Rudy Washington (Redlands)

Legend

- (C) Team captain
- (S) Suspended
- (I) Ineligible
- (W) Walk-on
- Injured
- Current redshirt

== Schedule/results ==
Date time, TV	Rank^{#}	Opponent^{#}	Result	Record	Site city, state
Non-Conference Regular Season
11/27/1987*	No. 11	vs. Stanford; Maui Invitational	W 78–75	1–0	Lahaina Civic Center; Maui, HI
11/28/1987*	No. 11	vs. No. 7 Kansas; Maui Invitational	W 100–81	2–0	Lahaina Civic Center; Maui, HI
11/29/1987*	No. 11	vs. Villanova; Maui Invitational	W 97–74	3–0	Lahaina Civic Center; Maui, HI
12/1/1987*	No. 6	Drake; Iowa Big Four	W 70–59	4–0	Carver-Hawkeye Arena (15,500); Iowa City, IA
12/4/1987*; 8:05 pm	No. 6	Navy; Amana-Hawkeye Classic	W 91–61	5–0	Carver-Hawkeye Arena (15,500); Iowa City, IA
12/5/1987*	No. 6	UC Irvine; Amana-Hawkeye Classic	W 124–88	6–0	Carver-Hawkeye Arena (15,500); Iowa City, IA
12/12/1987*; 7:05 pm	No. 3	No. 4 Arizona	L 59–66	6–1	Carver-Hawkeye Arena; Iowa City, IA
12/19/1987*	No. 7	at No. 20 Iowa State; Rivalry	L 100–102 ^{OT}	6–2	Hilton Coliseum; Ames, IA
12/21/1987*	No. 7	Texas-Pan American	W 110–64	7–2	Carver-Hawkeye Arena; Iowa City, IA
12/29/1987*	No. 14	vs. Illinois State; All-College Basketball Classic	L 88–89	7–3	Myriad Convention Center; Oklahoma City, OK
12/30/1987*	No. 14	vs. Oral Roberts; All-College Basketball Classic	W 126–94	8–3	Myriad Convention Center; Oklahoma City, OK
Big Ten Regular Season
1/6/1988	No. 16	No. 12 Indiana	W 84–70	9–3 (1–0)	Carver-Hawkeye Arena; Iowa City, IA
1/9/1988	No. 16	at No. 10 Purdue	L 79–80	9–4 (1–1)	Mackey Arena; West Lafayette, IN
1/11/1988*	No. 16	at Lafayette	W 109–68	10–4	Carver-Hawkeye Arena; Iowa City, IA
1/14/1988	No. 17	at Ohio State	L 83–87	10–5 (1–2)	St. John Arena; Columbus, OH
1/16/1988	No. 17	Northwestern	W 92–68	11–5 (2–2)	Carver-Hawkeye Arena (15,500); Iowa City, IA
1/21/1988	No. 19	No. 13 Illinois; Rivalry	W 93–79	12–5 (3–2)	Carver-Hawkeye Arena (15,500); Iowa City, IA
1/23/1988*	No. 19	Dartmouth	W 102–87	13–5	Carver-Hawkeye Arena; Iowa City, IA
1/25/1988	No. 19	at Wisconsin	W 104–89	14–5 (4–2)	Wisconsin Field House (9,119); Madison, WI
1/30/1988	No. 16	Minnesota	W 76–51	15–5 (5–2)	Carver-Hawkeye Arena; Iowa City, IA
2/3/1988	No. 13	at No. 11 Michigan	L 103–120	15–6 (5–3)	Crisler Arena; Ann Arbor, MI
2/6/1988	No. 13	Michigan State	W 101–77	16–6 (6–3)	Carver-Hawkeye Arena (15,500); Iowa City, IA
2/10/1988	No. 13	Ohio State	W 92–75	17–6 (7–3)	Carver-Hawkeye Arena (15,500); Iowa City, IA
2/15/1988; ESPN	No. 13	No. 2 Purdue	L 68–73	17–7 (7–4)	Carver-Hawkeye Arena (15,500); Iowa City, IA
2/20/1988	No. 13	at Minnesota	W 107–86	18–7 (8–4)	Williams Arena (16,406); Minnesota, MN
2/24/1988	No. 13	at Northwestern	W 91–74	19–7 (9–4)	Welsh-Ryan Arena (8,117); Evanston, IL
2/27/1988	No. 13	No. 7 Michigan	W 95–87	20–7 (10–4)	Carver-Hawkeye Arena (15,500); Iowa City, IA
3/3/1988	No. 11	at Michigan State	W 103–87	21–7 (11–4)	Jenison Fieldhouse (8,777); East Lansing, MI
3/6/1988	No. 11	at Illinois; Rivalry	L 81–94	21–8 (11–5)	Assembly Hall (16,538); Champaign, IL
3/10/1988	No. 15	at Wisconsin	W 103–70	22–8 (12–5)	Carver-Hawkeye Arena (15,500); Iowa City, IA
3/12/1988	No. 15	at Indiana	L 89–116	22–9 (12–6)	Assembly Hall (17,351); Bloomington, IN
NCAA Tournament
3/18/1988*	(5 W) No. 17	vs. (12 W) Florida State; First Round	W 102–98	23–9	Pauley Pavilion (9,500); Los Angeles, CA
3/20/1988*; CBS	(5 W) No. 17	vs. (4 W) No. 12 UNLV; Second Round	W 104–86	24–9	Pauley Pavilion (12,901); Los Angeles, CA
3/25/1988*; CBS	(5 W) No. 17	vs. (1 W) No. 2 Arizona; Sweet Sixteen	L 79–99	24–10	Kingdome; Seattle, WA
*Non-conference game. ^{#}Rankings from AP Poll. (#) Tournament seedings in parentheses. W=West.

== Rankings ==
Ranking movements Legend: ██ Increase in ranking ██ Decrease in ranking
	Week																
Poll	Pre	1	2	3	4	5	6	7	8	9	10	11	12	13	14	15	Final
AP	11	6	3	7	14	14	16	17	19	16	13	13	13	13	11	15	17
Coaches	Not released	10	3	8	14	14	16	18	19	18	14	15	13	13	11	15	16

== Awards and honors ==
- Ed Horton – First-team All-Big Ten, Big Ten Rebounding Leader

== Team players in the 1988 NBA draft ==
Round	Pick	Player	NBA club
2	42	Jeff Moe	Utah Jazz

Overall, five players from this team were selected in the NBA draft.
