= 1987–88 Michigan Wolverines men's basketball team =

American college basketball season

1987–88 Michigan Wolverines men's basketball

NCAA tournament, Sweet Sixteen
- Conference: Big Ten Conference

Ranking
- Coaches: No. 10
- AP: No. 10
- Record: 26–8 (13–5 Big Ten)
- Head coach: Bill Frieder
- Assistant coaches: Mike Boyd; Steve Fisher; David Hammer
- MVPs: Glen Rice; Gary Grant
- Captain: Gary Grant
- Home arena: Crisler Arena

1987–88 Big Ten Conference men's basketball standings
	Conf.				Overall
Team	W		L	PCT	W		L	PCT
No. 3 Purdue	16	–	2	.889	29	–	4	.879
No. 10 Michigan	13	–	5	.722	26	–	8	.765
No. 17 Iowa	12	–	6	.667	24	–	10	.706
No. 16 Illinois	12	–	6	.667	23	–	10	.697
Indiana	11	–	7	.611	19	–	10	.655
Ohio State	9	–	9	.500	20	–	13	.606
Wisconsin	6	–	12	.333	12	–	16	.429
Michigan State	5	–	13	.278	10	–	18	.357
Minnesota	4	–	14	.222	10	–	18	.357
Northwestern	2	–	16	.111	7	–	21	.250
Rankings from AP Poll

The 1987–88 Michigan Wolverines men's basketball team represented the University of Michigan in intercollegiate college basketball during the 1987–88 season. The team played its home games in the Crisler Arena in Ann Arbor, Michigan, and was a member of the Big Ten Conference. Under the direction of head coach Bill Frieder, the team finished second in the Big Ten Conference. The team earned the number three seed in the 1988 NCAA Division I men's basketball tournament where it advanced two rounds before losing. The team was ranked all seventeen weeks of the season in the Associated Press Top Twenty Poll where it began the season at number nine, ended at number ten and peaked at number seven. and it also ended the season ranked tenth in the final UPI Coaches' Poll.

The team was the national statistical champion in team field goal percentage (54.6%, 1198 of 2196). The team established the current Big Ten Conference records for team single-game assists by twice totaling 37 (vs. Western Michigan December 7, 1987, and vs. Eastern Michigan December 12, 1987) as well as the current team assist record for conference games with 36 (vs. Iowa February 3, 1988). The team also established Big Ten team records for single-season field goals made (1198), and single-season assists (694, 1987–88) that it would surpass the following season. It also set the single-game (conference games only) three-point field goal percentage record that would only last one night (.875, 7 of 8, vs. Iowa February 3, 1988).

Glen Rice was the conference scoring champion with a 22.9 points per game average in conference games, while Gary Grant led the conference in both steals and assists with 2.72 and 6.5 averages, respectively in conference games. Grant served as team captain and shared team MVP with Rice. Grant earned consensus All-American recognition.

The team set a new school record by totaling 2973 points over the course of the season, surpassing the record of 2821 set the prior year. The record would be rebroken the following season. Loy Vaught also set the Michigan single field goal percentage record at 62.18% which he would break the following season. For the fourth of five consecutive seasons, the team set the school record for single-season field goal percentage on with a 54.6% (1198-for-2196) performance. Grant set the individual single-season three-point field goal percentage record of 48.53%, but it was eclipsed the following season by Glen Rice. Also against Iowa on February 3, the team set the current three-point field goal single game percentage record by making 7 of its eight attempts, surpassing the December 6, 1986, record of 75%. Gary Grant's established the current school record when his single-season total of 234 assists surpassed his own school record total of 185 that he set two years earlier. His 731 career assists also established the current school record, surpassing Antoine Joubert's 539 set the prior season. He also surpassed Dave Baxter's school single season average set in 1978 of 6.59 with the current record of 6.88 assists per game and Eric Turner's 1984 career average of 5.00 per game with a 5.67 average that was surpassed in 1990 by Rumeal Robinson. For the second of three consecutive seasons, the team set the school single-season total assist record with a total of 694, surpassing the prior total of 652. Grant's current school record total 14 assists in a game on December 7, 1987, against Western Michigan and he repeated the feat on December 19 against Northern Michigan. This surpassed Mark Bodnar and Antoine Joubert, who had each posted 13 assists in a game previously. Grant's career steals total of 300 and average of 2.33 surpassed Thad Garner's 1982 statistics and remain school records. Gary Grant career total of 4231 minutes surpassed Joubert's school record total of 3960 set the prior year. Louis Bullock would break the record in 1999. Gary Grant ended his career with 129 games played and 128 games started, which surpassed Joubert's 1987 school records of 127 games and 115 starts. Glen Rice and Louis Bullock would surpass these records for games and starts in 1989 and 1999, respectively.

In the 64-team NCAA Division I men's basketball tournament, number three seeded Michigan advanced two rounds by defeating the fourteen-seeded Boise State Broncos 63–58 and the six-seeded Florida Gators 108–85. In the third round the team was defeated by two-seeded North Carolina 78–69.

== Schedule ==
Date time, TV	Rank^{#}	Opponent^{#}	Result	Record	Site city, state
Regular Season
Nov 27, 1987*	No. 9	vs. Miami (FL); Great Alaska Shootout	W 109–76	1–0	Sullivan Arena; Anchorage, Alaska
Nov 28, 1987*	No. 9	vs. No. 17 Arizona; Great Alaska Shootout	L 64–79	1–1	Sullivan Arena; Anchorage, Alaska
Nov 29, 1987*	No. 9	vs. UAB; Great Alaska Shootout	W 78–76	2–1	Sullivan Arena; Anchorage, Alaska
Dec 2, 1987*	No. 15	Bowling Green	W 92–71	3–1	Crisler Arena; Ann Arbor, Michigan
Dec 5, 1987*	No. 15	Central Michigan	W 97–67	4–1	Crisler Arena; Ann Arbor, Michigan
Dec 7, 1987*	No. 15	Western Michigan	W 113–66	5–1	Crisler Arena; Ann Arbor, Michigan
Dec 10, 1987*	No. 15	Austin Peay	W 88–67	6–1	Crisler Arena; Ann Arbor, Michigan
Dec 12, 1987*	No. 15	Eastern Michigan	W 115–63	7–1	Crisler Arena; Ann Arbor, Michigan
Dec 19, 1987*	No. 13	Northern Michigan	W 111–87	8–1	Crisler Arena; Ann Arbor, Michigan
Dec 21, 1987*	No. 13	Grambling State	W 78–61	9–1	Crisler Arena; Ann Arbor, Michigan
Dec 28, 1987*	No. 11	vs. Clemson; South Florida Invitational	W 93–88	10–1	Sun Dome; Tampa, Florida
Dec 29, 1987*	No. 12	at USF; South Florida Invitational	W 92–56	11–1	Sun Dome; Tampa, Florida
Jan 6, 1988	No. 11	at Northwestern	W 92–69	12–1 (1–0)	Welsh-Ryan Arena; Evanston, Illinois
Jan 9, 1988	No. 11	Minnesota	W 103–71	13–1 (2–0)	Crisler Arena; Ann Arbor, Michigan
Jan 14, 1988	No. 10	at Michigan State	W 90–72	14–1 (3–0)	Jenison Fieldhouse; East Lansing, Michigan
Jan 18, 1988	No. 7	at Ohio State	L 68–70	14–2 (3–1)	St. John Arena; Columbus, Ohio
Jan 21, 1988	No. 7	Wisconsin	W 65–54	15–2 (4–1)	Crisler Arena; Ann Arbor, Michigan
Jan 24, 1988	No. 7	at Indiana	W 72–60	16–2 (5–1)	Assembly Hall; Bloomington, Indiana
Jan 28, 1988	No. 8	No. 13 Illinois	W 76–64	17–2 (6–1)	Crisler Arena; Ann Arbor, Michigan
Jan 31, 1988*	No. 8	at No. 17 Syracuse	L 71–89	17–3	Carrier Dome; Syracuse, New York
Feb 3, 1988	No. 8	No. 13 Iowa	W 120–103	18–3 (7–1)	Crisler Arena; Ann Arbor, Michigan
Feb 7, 1988	No. 11	No. 6 Purdue	L 87–91	18–4 (7–2)	Crisler Arena; Ann Arbor, Michigan
Feb 11, 1988	No. 12	at Wisconsin	W 80–67	19–4 (8–2)	Crisler Arena; Ann Arbor, Michigan
Feb 13, 1988	No. 12	No. 19 Indiana	W 92–72	20–4 (9–2)	Crisler Arena; Ann Arbor, Michigan
Feb 17, 1988	No. 10	at Minnesota	W 82–78	21–4 (10–2)	Williams Arena; Minneapolis, Minnesota
Feb 22, 1988	No. 10	Michigan State	W 77–69	22–4 (11–2)	Crisler Arena; Ann Arbor, Michigan
Feb 27, 1988	No. 7	at No. 13 Iowa	L 87–95	22–5 (11–3)	Carver-Hawkeye Arena; Iowa City, Iowa
Mar 2, 1988	No. 10	Northwestern	W 105–67	23–5 (12–3)	Crisler Arena; Ann Arbor, Michigan
Mar 5, 1988	No. 10	at No. 2 Purdue	L 67–80	23–6 (12–4)	Mackey Arena; West Lafayette, Indiana
Mar 9, 1988	No. 10	at No. 19 Illinois	L 74–85	23–7 (12–5)	Assembly Hall; Champaign, Illinois
Mar 12, 1988	No. 10	Ohio State	W 95–76	24–7 (13–5)	Crisler Arena; Ann Arbor, Michigan
NCAA tournament
Mar 17, 1988	(3 W) No. 10	vs. (14 W) Boise State; First Round	W 63–58	25–7	Jon M. Huntsman Center; Salt Lake City, Utah
Mar 19, 1988	(3 W) No. 10	vs. (6 W) Florida; Second Round	W 108–85	26–7	Jon M. Huntsman Center; Salt Lake City, Utah
Mar 25, 1988	(3 W) No. 10	vs. (2 W) No. 7 North Carolina	L 69–78	26–8	The Kingdome; Seattle, Washington
*Non-conference game. ^{#}Rankings from AP Poll. (#) Tournament seedings in parentheses.

== Rankings ==
Ranking movements Legend: ██ Increase in ranking ██ Decrease in ranking
	Week																
Poll	Pre	1	2	3	4	5	6	7	8	9	10	11	12	13	14	15	Final
AP Poll	9	15	15	13	11	12	11	10	7	8	11	12	10	7	10	10	10

== Team players drafted into the NBA ==
Six players from this team were selected in the NBA draft.

Year	Round	Pick	Overall	Player	NBA club
1988	1	15	15	Gary Grant	Seattle SuperSonics
1989	1	4	4	Glen Rice	Miami Heat
1990	1	10	10	Rumeal Robinson	Atlanta Hawks
1990	1	13	13	Loy Vaught	Los Angeles Clippers
1990	1	16	16	Terry Mills	Milwaukee Bucks
1990	2	27	54	Sean Higgins	San Antonio Spurs

== See also ==
- NCAA Men's Division I tournament bids by school
- NCAA Men's Division I tournament bids by school and conference
- NCAA Division I men's basketball tournament all-time team records
