= 1987–88 NCAA Division I men's basketball rankings =

- Season: 1987–88
- NCAA Tournament: 1988
- Preseason No. 1: Syracuse
- NCAA Tournament Champions: Kansas
NCAA Division I men's basketball rankings


The 1987–88 NCAA Division I men's basketball rankings was made up of two human polls, the AP Poll and the Coaches Poll, in addition to various other preseason polls.

== Legend ==
	Increase in ranking
	Decrease in ranking
	New to rankings from previous week
Italics	Number of first place votes
(#–#)	Win–loss record
т	Tied with team above or below also with this symbol

== AP Poll ==
	Preseason	Week 2 Dec. 1	Week 3 Dec. 8	Week 4 Dec. 15	Week 5 Dec. 22	Week 6 Dec. 29	Week 7 Jan. 5	Week 8 Jan. 12	Week 9 Jan. 19	Week 10 Jan. 26	Week 11 Feb. 2	Week 12 Feb. 9	Week 13 Feb. 16	Week 14 Feb. 23	Week 15 Mar. 1	Week 16 Mar. 8	Final Mar. 15	
1.	Syracuse	North Carolina (3–0)	Kentucky (3–0)	Kentucky (4–0)	Arizona (9–0)	Arizona (10–0)	Kentucky (9–0)	Arizona (14–1)	Arizona (16–1)	Arizona (18–1)	Arizona (20–1)	Temple (18–1) (23)	Temple (20–1)	Temple (22–1)	Temple (25–1)	Temple (27–1)	Temple (29–1)	1.
2.	Purdue	Kentucky (1–0)	Pittsburgh (2–0)	Arizona (7–0)	Kentucky (6–0)	Kentucky (6–0)	Pittsburgh (9–0)	North Carolina (11–1)	North Carolina (13–1)	Purdue (17–1)	UNLV (19–1)	Purdue (19–2) (16)	Purdue (20–2)	Purdue (22–2)	Purdue (24–2)	Purdue (26–2)	Arizona (31–2)	2.
3.	North Carolina	Syracuse (2–1)	Iowa (6–0)	Pittsburgh (4–0)	Pittsburgh (4–0)	Pittsburgh (6–0)	Arizona (12–1)	Oklahoma (14–0)	Temple (12–0)	North Carolina (14–2)	BYU (15–0)	Arizona (21–2) (15)	Arizona (23–2)	Arizona (25–2)	Arizona (26–2)	Arizona (26–2)	Purdue (27–3)	3.
4.	Pittsburgh	Pittsburgh (1–0)	Arizona (5–0)	North Carolina (5–1)	North Carolina (7–1)	North Carolina (7–1)	North Carolina (9–1)	Temple (10–0)	Kentucky (12–1)	UNLV (17–1)	Duke (13–2)	Oklahoma (20–2) (9)	Oklahoma (22–2)	Oklahoma (24–2)	Oklahoma (26–2)	Oklahoma (27–3)	Oklahoma (30–3)	4.
5.	Kentucky	Indiana (1–0)	North Carolina (4–1)	Indiana (5–1)	Wyoming (6–0)	Wyoming (8–0)	Wyoming (11–0)	Kentucky (10–1)	Purdue (15–1)	Duke (12–2)	Temple (16–1)	Pittsburgh (16–2) (2)	North Carolina (18–3)	Duke (20–3)	UNLV (25–3)	Pittsburgh (22–5)	Duke (24–6)	5.
6.	Indiana	Iowa (3–0)	Indiana (2–1)	Wyoming (4–0)	Temple (5–0)	Temple (5–0)	Temple (7–0)	Pittsburgh (10–1)	Pittsburgh (13–1)	Temple (14–1)	Purdue (17–2)	North Carolina (16–3)	Duke (18–3)	Pittsburgh (19–3)	North Carolina (21–4)	Kentucky (22–5)	Kentucky (25–5)	6.
7.	Kansas	Florida (4–0)	Wyoming (3–0)	Iowa (6–1)	Syracuse (7–2)	Syracuse (8–2)	Syracuse (10–2)	Duke (9–1)	Michigan (14–1)	BYU (14–0)	Oklahoma (18–2)	UNLV (20–2)	BYU (20–1)	Michigan (21–4)	Pittsburgh (20–4)	UNLV (26–4)	North Carolina (24–6)	7.
8.	Missouri	Missouri (0–0)	Syracuse (4–2)	Temple (4–0)	Florida (6–1)	Florida (7–1)	Oklahoma (12–0)	Purdue (13–1)	UNLV (14–1)	Michigan (14–2)	North Carolina (15–3)	BYU (17–1)	Pittsburgh (17–3)	UNLV (23–3)	Kentucky (20–5)	Duke (21–6)	Pittsburgh (23–6)	8.
9.	Michigan	Arizona (2–0)	Missouri (2–0)	Syracuse (6–2)	Duke (4–0)	Duke (5–0)	Duke (6–1)	Syracuse (12–2)	Duke (10–2)	Kentucky (13–2)	Pittsburgh (15–2)	Duke (16–3)	Kentucky (18–3)	North Carolina (20–4)	Duke (20–5)	North Carolina (22–5)	Syracuse (25–8)	9.
10.	Wyoming	Wyoming (1–0)	Duke (3–0)	Duke (4–0)	Purdue (7–1)	Oklahoma (10–0)	Purdue (10–1)	Michigan (13–1)	Iowa State (15–2)	Oklahoma (16–2)	Kentucky (14–3)	Kentucky (16–3)	Michigan (20–4)	Syracuse (20–6)	Michigan (22–5)	Michigan (23–6)	Michigan (24–7)	10.
11.	Iowa	Purdue (1–1)	Temple (1–0)	Florida (5–1)	Michigan (8–1)	Purdue (8–1)	Michigan (11–1)	Georgetown (11–1)	Oklahoma (14–2)	Pittsburgh (13–2)	Michigan (17–3)	Syracuse (17–5)	UNLV (21–3)	BYU (21–2)	Iowa (20–7)	NC State (23–6)	Bradley (26–4)	11.
12.	Temple	Temple (0–0)	Florida (4–1)	Purdue (6–1)	Oklahoma (7–0)	Michigan (9–1)	Indiana (8–2)	Wyoming (11–2)	BYU (12–0)	Iowa State (16–3)	Syracuse (15–5)	Michigan (18–4)	Syracuse (18–6)	Kentucky (18–5)	Syracuse (21–7)	Bradley (25–4)	UNLV (27–5)	12.
13.	Louisville	Duke (1–0)	Purdue (4–1)	Michigan (7–1)	Indiana (6–2)	Indiana (7–2)	UNLV (10–0)	UNLV (12–1)	Illinois (13–3)	Illinois (14–4)	Iowa (15–5)	Iowa (16–6)	Iowa (17–6)	Iowa (18–7)	Georgia Tech (21–6)	Syracuse (22–8)	Wyoming (26–5)	13.
14.	Florida	Louisville (0–0)	Georgetown (3–0)	Oklahoma (6–0)	Iowa (6–2)	Iowa (7–2)	Georgetown (9–1)	Iowa State (13–2)	Syracuse (12–4)	Florida (14–4)	Georgetown (14–4)	Kansas State (14–4)	NC State (16–5)	Bradley (19–4)	Bradley (22–4)	Wyoming (23–5)	NC State (24–7)	14.
15.	Duke	Michigan (2–1)	Michigan (4–1)	UNLV (5–0)	UNLV (5–0)	UNLV (7–0)	Florida (8–3)	Indiana (8–3)	Georgetown (11–3)	Georgetown (12–4)	Vanderbilt (13–4)	Bradley (14–3)	Missouri (16–5)	Missouri (17–6)	BYU (23–3)	Iowa (21–8)	Loyola Marymount (27–3)	15.
16.	Georgetown	Kansas (1–2)	Oklahoma (3–0)	Missouri (3–1)	Iowa State (8–1)	Iowa State (9–1)	Iowa (8–3)	Kansas (11–3)	Kansas (12–4)	Iowa (12–5)	Iowa State (15–5)	NC State (14–4)	Vanderbilt (16–5)	Wyoming (20–5)	NC State (20–6)	Loyola Marymount (26–3)	Illinois (22–9)	16.
17.	Arizona	Georgetown (2–0)	UNLV (3–0)	Kansas (6–2)	Missouri (4–1)	Kansas (7–2)	Iowa State (11–2)	Iowa (9–4)	Wyoming (12–3)	Syracuse (13–5)	Illinois (14–6)	Vanderbilt (14–5)	Bradley (16–4)	Vanderbilt (17–6)	Wyoming (22–5)	BYU (24–4)	Iowa (22–9)	17.
18.	Georgia Tech	Oklahoma (1–0)	Kansas (4–2)	Georgetown (4–1)	Kansas (7–2)	Georgetown (7–1)	Kansas (8–3)	New Mexico (14–3)	UTEP (15–2)	UTEP (16–3)	Bradley (13–2)	Wyoming (17–4)	Georgetown (16–6)	Southern Miss (16–6)	Loyola Marymount (24–3)	Georgia Tech (21–8)	Xavier (26–3)	18.
19.	Oklahoma	UNLV (0–0)	Notre Dame (1–1)	Memphis State (4–1)	Georgetown (6–1)	Memphis State (6–2)	Illinois (9–2)	Auburn (9–2)	Iowa (11–5)	Villanova (14–4)	Florida (15–5)	Indiana (13–6)	Wyoming (18–5)	Loyola Marymount (22–3)	Vanderbilt (18–7)	Illinois (20–9)	BYU (25–5)	19.
20.	DePaul	Memphis State (2–0)	Memphis State (3–0)	Iowa State (7–1)	Memphis State (5–1)	Louisville (3–2)	St. John's (8–1)	Illinois (11–3)	NC State (10–2)	Southern Miss (14–2)	St. John's (14–3)	Villanova (16–6)	Loyola Marymount (20–3)	Georgia Tech (19–6)	Xavier (22–3)	Xavier (24–3)	Kansas State (22–8)	20.
	Preseason	Week 2 Dec. 1	Week 3 Dec. 8	Week 4 Dec. 15	Week 5 Dec. 22	Week 6 Dec. 29	Week 7 Jan. 5	Week 8 Jan. 12	Week 9 Jan. 19	Week 10 Jan. 26	Week 11 Feb. 2	Week 12 Feb. 9	Week 13 Feb. 16	Week 14 Feb. 23	Week 15 Mar. 1	Week 16 Mar. 8	Final Mar. 15	
		Dropped: Georgia Tech; DePaul	Dropped: Louisville (0–1)	Dropped: Notre Dame (3–2)	None	Dropped: Missouri (4–2)	Dropped: Memphis State (7–2); Louisville	Dropped: Florida (10–4); St. John's (9–3)	Dropped: Indiana; New Mexico; Auburn	Dropped: Kansas; Wyoming; NC State	Dropped: UTEP (17–4); Villanova; Southern Miss	Dropped: Georgetown (14–6); Iowa State; Florida (16–6); St. John's; UTEP	Dropped: Kansas State; Indiana; Villanova	Dropped: NC State (18–6); Georgetown	Dropped: Missouri; Southern Miss	Dropped: Vanderbilt	Dropped: Georgia Tech (21–9)	

== Coaches Poll ==
	Week 1 Dec. 1	Week 2 Dec. 8	Week 3 Dec. 15	Week 4 Dec. 22	Week 5 Dec. 29	Week 6 Jan. 5	Week 7 Jan. 12	Week 8 Jan. 19	Week 9 Jan. 26	Week 10 Feb. 2	Week 11 Feb. 9	Week 12 Feb. 16	Week 13 Feb. 23	Week 14 Mar. 1	Week 15 Mar. 8	Final Mar. 15	
1.	North Carolina (3–0)	Kentucky (3–0)	Kentucky (4–0)	Kentucky (6–0)	Arizona (10–0)	Kentucky (9–0)	Arizona (14–1)	Arizona (16–1)	Arizona (18–1)	Arizona (20–1)	Temple (18–1)	Temple (20–1)	Temple (22–1)	Temple (25–1)	Temple (27–1)	Temple (29–1)	1.
2.	Syracuse (2–1)	Arizona (5–0)	Arizona (7–0)	Arizona (9–0)	Kentucky (6–0)	Pittsburgh (9–0)	North Carolina (11–1)	North Carolina (13–1)	Purdue (17–1)	BYU (15–0)	Purdue (19–2)	Arizona (23–2)	Purdue (22–2)	Arizona (26–2)	Purdue (26–2)	Arizona (31–2)	2.
3.	Indiana (1–0)	Iowa (6–0)	Pittsburgh (4–0)	Pittsburgh (4–0)	North Carolina (7–1)	North Carolina (9–1)	Oklahoma (14–0)	Kentucky (12–1)	North Carolina (14–2)	UNLV (19–1)	Arizona (21–2)	Purdue (20–2)	Arizona (25–2)	Oklahoma (26–2)	Arizona (26–2)	Oklahoma (30–3)	3.
4.	Pittsburgh (1–0)	North Carolina (4–1)	North Carolina (5–1)	North Carolina (7–1)	Pittsburgh (6–0)	Arizona (12–1)	Temple (10–0)	Purdue (15–1)	Duke (12–2)	Temple (16–1)	Oklahoma (20–2)	Oklahoma (22–2)	Oklahoma (24–2)	Purdue (24–2)	Oklahoma (27–3)	Purdue (27–3)	4.
5.	Kentucky (1–0)	Pittsburgh (2–0)	Indiana (5–1)	Wyoming (6–0)	Wyoming (8–0)	Wyoming (11–0)	Kentucky (10–1)	Temple (12–0)	UNLV (17–1)	Duke (13–2)	North Carolina (16–3)	North Carolina (18–3)	Duke (20–3)	North Carolina (21–4)	Pittsburgh (22–5)	Kentucky (25–5)	5.
6.	Florida (4–0)	Indiana (2–1)	Wyoming (4–0)	Duke (4–0)	Duke (5–0)	Temple (7–0)	Duke (9–1)	Pittsburgh (13–1)	Temple (14–1)	Purdue (17–2)	BYU (17–1)	Duke (18–3)	Pittsburgh (19–3)	UNLV (25–3)	Kentucky (22–5)	Duke (24–6)	6.
7.	Arizona (2–0)	Syracuse (4–2)	Duke (4–0)	Syracuse (7–2)	Syracuse (8–2)	Syracuse (10–2)	Pittsburgh (10–1)	UNLV (14–1)	BYU (14–0)	North Carolina (15–3)	UNLV (20–2)	BYU (20–1)	BYU (21–2)	Pittsburgh (20–4)	Duke (21–6)	North Carolina (24–6)	7.
8.	Missouri (0–0)	Wyoming (3–0)	Iowa (6–1)	Temple (5–0)	Temple (5–0)	Oklahoma (12–0)	Purdue (13–1)	Michigan (14–1)	Michigan (14–2)	Oklahoma (18–2)	Pittsburgh (16–2)	Pittsburgh (17–3)	UNLV (23–3)	Duke (20–5)	UNLV (26–4)	Pittsburgh (23–6)	8.
9.	Duke (1–0)	Duke (3–0)	Syracuse (6–2)	Florida (6–1)	Florida (7–1)	Duke (6–1)	Syracuse (12–2)	Duke (10–2) т	Kentucky (13–2)	Pittsburgh (15–2)	Duke (16–3)	Kentucky (18–3)	North Carolina (20–4)	Michigan (22–5)	North Carolina (22–5)	Syracuse (25–8)	9.
10.	Iowa (3–0)	Missouri (2–0)	Temple (4–0)	Purdue (7–1)	Oklahoma (10–0)	Purdue (10–1)	Michigan (13–1)	BYU (12–0) т	Oklahoma (16–2)	Kentucky (14–3)	Kentucky (16–3)	Michigan (20–4)	Michigan (21–4)	Kentucky (20–5)	Michigan (23–6)	Michigan (24–7)	10.
11.	Wyoming (1–0)	Georgetown (3–0)	Florida (5–1)	Michigan (8–1)	Purdue (8–1)	Michigan (11–1)	Georgetown (11–1)	Oklahoma (14–2)	Pittsburgh (13–2)	Michigan (17–3)	Syracuse (17–5)	UNLV (21–3)	Syracuse (20–6)	Iowa (20–7)	NC State (23–6)	NC State (24–7)	11.
12.	Georgetown (2–0)	Florida (4–1)	Michigan (7–1)	Indiana (6–2)	Michigan (9–1)	UNLV (10–0)	Wyoming (11–2)	Iowa State (15–2)	Florida (14–4)	Syracuse (15–5)	Michigan (18–4)	Syracuse (18–6)	Kentucky (18–5)	NC State (20–6)	Bradley (25–4)	Bradley (26–4)	12.
13.	Michigan (2–1)	Temple (1–0)	Purdue (6–1)	Oklahoma (7–0)	Indiana (7–2)	Indiana (8–2)	UNLV (12–1)	Syracuse (12–4)	Syracuse (13–5)	Georgetown (14–4)	NC State (14–4)	Iowa (17–6)	Iowa (18–7)	Syracuse (21–7)	Syracuse (22–8)	Wyoming (26–5)	13.
14.	Purdue (1–1)	Purdue (4–1)	Oklahoma (6–0)	UNLV (5–0)	UNLV (7–0)	Georgetown (9–1)	BYU (11–0)	Illinois (13–3)	Illinois (14–4)	Iowa (15–5)	Kansas State (14–4)	NC State (16–5)	Bradley (19–4)	Georgia Tech (21–6)	BYU (24–4)	Loyola Marymount (27–3)	14.
15.	Temple (0–0)	Michigan (4–1)	UNLV (5–0)	Georgetown (6–1)	Iowa (7–2)	Florida (8–3)	Indiana (8–3)	Georgetown (11–3)	Georgetown (12–4)	Vanderbilt (13–4)	Iowa (16–6)	Georgetown (16–6)	Loyola Marymount (22–3)	BYU (23–3)	Iowa (21–8)	UNLV (27–5)	15.
16.	Louisville (0–0)	Oklahoma (3–0)	Georgetown (4–1)	Iowa State (8–1)	Georgetown (7–1)	Iowa (8–3)	Kansas (11–3)	Wyoming (12–3) т	UTEP (16–3)	Bradley (13–2)	Wyoming (17–4)	Vanderbilt (16–5)	Georgia Tech (19–6)	Loyola Marymount (24–3)	Loyola Marymount (26–3)	Iowa (22–9)	16.
17.	Oklahoma (1–0)	UNLV (3–0)	Missouri (3–1)	Iowa (6–2)	Iowa State (9–1) т	Kansas (8–3)	Iowa State (13–2)	UTEP (15–2) т	Iowa State (16–3)	Illinois (14–6)	Indiana (13–6)	Missouri (16–5)	Missouri (17–6)	Bradley (22–4)	Wyoming (23–5)	Illinois (22–9)	17.
18.	UNLV (0–0)	Notre Dame (1–1)	Kansas (6–2)	Kansas (7–2)	Kansas (7–2) т	Illinois (9–2)	Iowa (9–4)	Kansas (12–4)	Iowa (12–5)	St. John's (14–3)	Vanderbilt (14–5)	Bradley (16–4) т	NC State (18–6)	Vanderbilt (18–7)	Georgia Tech (21–8)	DePaul (21–7)	18.
19.	Kansas (1–2)	Kansas (4–2)	Illinois (7–1)	Missouri (4–1)	Illinois (4–2)	Iowa State (11–2) т	New Mexico (14–3)	Iowa (11–5)	Villanova (14–4)	UTEP (17–4)	Florida (16–6)	Wyoming (18–5) т	Vanderbilt (17–6)	Wyoming (22–5)	Illinois (20–9)	Xavier (26–3)	19.
20.	NC State (0–0)	Auburn (2–0)	Memphis State (3–1)	Georgia Tech (6–1)	Missouri (4–2)	St. John's (8–1) т	Florida (10–4)	NC State (10–2) т Florida (12–4) т	Southern Miss (14–2) т Missouri (11–4) т	Florida (15–5)	Bradley (14–3) т Georgetown (14–6) т	Loyola Marymount (20–3)	Wyoming (20–5)	Xavier (22–3)	UTEP (21–8)	Kansas State (22–8)	20.
	Week 1 Dec. 1	Week 2 Dec. 8	Week 3 Dec. 15	Week 4 Dec. 22	Week 5 Dec. 29	Week 6 Jan. 5	Week 7 Jan. 12	Week 8 Jan. 19	Week 9 Jan. 26	Week 10 Feb. 2	Week 11 Feb. 9	Week 12 Feb. 16	Week 13 Feb. 23	Week 14 Mar. 1	Week 15 Mar. 8	Final Mar. 15	
		Dropped: Louisville (0–1); NC State (2–0)	Dropped: Notre Dame (3–2); Auburn	Dropped: Illinois (7–2); Memphis State (3–1)	Dropped: Georgia Tech (6–2)	Dropped: Missouri	Dropped: Illinois (11–3); St. John's (9–3)	Dropped: Indiana (9–5); New Mexico	Dropped: Wyoming; Kansas; NC State	Dropped: Iowa State (15–5); Villanova; Southern Miss; Missouri	Dropped: Illinois (14–8); St. John's; UTEP	Dropped: Kansas State; Indiana; Florida	Dropped: Georgetown	Dropped: Missouri	Dropped: Vanderbilt; Xavier (24–3)	Dropped: BYU (25–5); Georgia Tech (21–9); UTEP (23–9)	
