= 1987–88 Indiana State Sycamores men's basketball team =

American college basketball season

1987–88 Indiana State Sycamores men's basketball
- Conference: Missouri Valley Conference
- Record: 7–21 (3–11 MVC)
- Head coach: Ron Greene (3th season)
- Home arena: Hulman Center

1987–88 Missouri Valley Conference men's basketball standings
	Conf.				Overall
Team	W		L	PCT	W		L	PCT
No. 11 Bradley †	12	–	2	.857	26	–	5	.839
Wichita State	11	–	3	.786	20	–	10	.667
Illinois State	9	–	5	.643	18	–	13	.581
Southern Illinois	6	–	8	.429	12	–	16	.429
Creighton	6	–	8	.429	16	–	16	.500
Drake	5	–	9	.357	14	–	14	.500
Tulsa	4	–	10	.286	8	–	20	.286
Indiana State	3	–	11	.214	7	–	21	.250
† 1988 MVC tournament winner Rankings from AP Poll

1987–88 Indiana State Sycamores men's basketball team represented Indiana State University during the 1987–88 men's college basketball season.

The Sycamores were led by third year head coach Ron Greene and finished the season with an overall record of 7–21, while going 3–11 in the Missouri Valley Conference.

== Roster ==
The team lost 8 of the 15 players from the previous season. A notable addition to the team was Eddie Bird, younger brother of former Sycamores' player Larry Bird.

1987–88 Indiana State Sycamores men's basketball team
Players
Coaches

Pos.	#	Name	Height	Weight	Year	Hometown
G	15	Richie Adderly	6 ft 1 in (1.85 m)	180 lb (82 kg)	So	Freeport, Bahamas
F	41	Olufemi Akinola	6 ft 8 in (2.03 m)	210 lb (95 kg)	So	Onto St., Nigeria
F	50	Rotimi Alakija	6 ft 8 in (2.03 m)	225 lb (102 kg)	So	Lagos, Nigeria
F	42	Eddie Bird	6 ft 8 in (2.03 m)	225 lb (102 kg)	Fr	French Park, Indiana
F/C	40	Larry Bush	6 ft 8 in (2.03 m)	225 lb (102 kg)	Fr	Chicago, Illinois
G	24	Dion Campbell	6 ft 5 in (1.96 m)	195 lb (88 kg)	Sr	Michigan City, Indiana
G	45	Ron Cheatham	6 ft 4 in (1.93 m)	195 lb (88 kg)	So	Paris, Illinois
G	21	Jimmie Holliday	6 ft 0 in (1.83 m)	165 lb (75 kg)	Jr	Saginaw, Michigan
F/C	52	Darin Liles	6 ft 9 in (2.06 m)	235 lb (107 kg)	Fr	Town Creek, Alabama
C	35	Jerome Stainback	6 ft 9 in (2.06 m)	215 lb (98 kg)	Jr	Maywood, Illinois
G	10	Rob Vickers	5 ft 10 in (1.78 m)	170 lb (77 kg)	Fr	Kingston, Maine
F/C	51	Brian Williamson	6 ft 9 in (2.06 m)	220 lb (100 kg)	Sr	Lota, Kansas

Head coach

- Ron Greene

Assistant coach(es)

- Mark Atherton
- Mike Calhoun
- Al Perry
- Mike Saylor

Legend

- (C) Team captain
- (S) Suspended
- (I) Ineligible
- (W) Walk-on
- Injured
- Current redshirt

Roster

== Schedule ==
Date time, TV	Rank^{#}	Opponent^{#}	Result	Record	Site city, state
November 28*		Fredonia State	W 68–56	1–0	Hulman Center; Terre Haute, Indiana
November 30*		Ball State	L 69–72	1–1	Hulman Center; Terre Haute, Indiana
December 3*		at Boston University	L 67–81	1–2	Case Gym; Boston, Massachusetts
December 5*		Eastern Illinois	W 64–63	2–2	Hulman Center; Terre Haute, Indiana
December 8*		at Butler	L 65–84	2–3	Hinkle Fieldhouse; Indianapolis, Indiana
December 11*		vs. Washington State	L 61–73	2–4	Assembly Hall; Bloomington, Indiana
December 12*		vs. James Madison	L 63–65	2–5	Assembly Hall; Bloomington, Indiana
December 19*		Butler	L 44–64	2–6	Hulman Center; Terre Haute, Indiana
December 21*		at St. Louis	L 58–74	2–7	Kiel Auditorium; St. Louis, Missouri
December 30*		Evansville	L 68–74	2–8	Hulman Center; Terre Haute, Indiana
January 2*		St. Ambrose	W 87–74	3–8	Hulman Center; Terre Haute, Indiana
January 7		at Drake	L 54–63	3–9 (0–1)	Veterans Memorial Auditorium; Des Moines, Iowa
January 9*		Missouri Valley College	W 76–56	4–9 (0–1)	Hulman Center; Terre Haute, Indiana
January 14		Bradley	L 68–79	4–10 (0–2)	Hulman Center; Terre Haute, Indiana
January 16		at Southern Illinois	L 72–82 ^{OT}	4–11 (0–3)	The SIU Arena; Carbondale, Illinois
January 20		at Illinois State	L 64–72	4–12 (0–4)	Horton Field House; Normal, Illinois
January 22		at Creighton	L 63–85	4–13 (0–5)	Omaha Civic Auditorium; Omaha, Nebraska
January 28		Drake	W 84–78	5–13 (1–5)	Hulman Center; Terre Haute, Indiana
January 30		Creighton	L 71–75	5–14 (1–6)	Hulman Center; Terre Haute, Indiana
February 2*		DePaul	L 56–64	5–15 (1–6)	Hulman Center; Terre Haute, Indiana
February 6		at Wichita State	L 70–102	5–16 (1–7)	Levitt Arena; Wichita, Kansas
February 8		at Tulsa	L 67–70	5–17 (1–8)	Tulsa Convention Center; Tulsa, Oklahoma
February 11		Wichita State	W 63–62	6–17 (2–8)	Hulman Center; Terre Haute, Indiana
February 13		Tulsa	W 93–88 ^{2OT}	7–17 (3–8)	Hulman Center; Terre Haute, Indiana
February 17		Illinois State	L 59–69	7–18 (3–9)	Hulman Center; Terre Haute, Indiana
February 24		Southern Illinois	L 87–90 ^{OT}	6–19 (3–10)	Hulman Center; Terre Haute, Indiana
February 27		at No. 14 Bradley	L 74–95	7–20 (3–11)	Carver Arena; Peoria, Illinois
MVC Tournament
March 5		vs. No. 14 Bradley	L 74–93	7–21 (3–11)	Carver Arena; Peoria, Illinois
*Non-conference game. ^{#}Rankings from AP Poll. (#) Tournament seedings in parentheses.
