= 1987–88 Houston Cougars men's basketball team =

American college basketball season

1987–88 Houston Cougars men's basketball
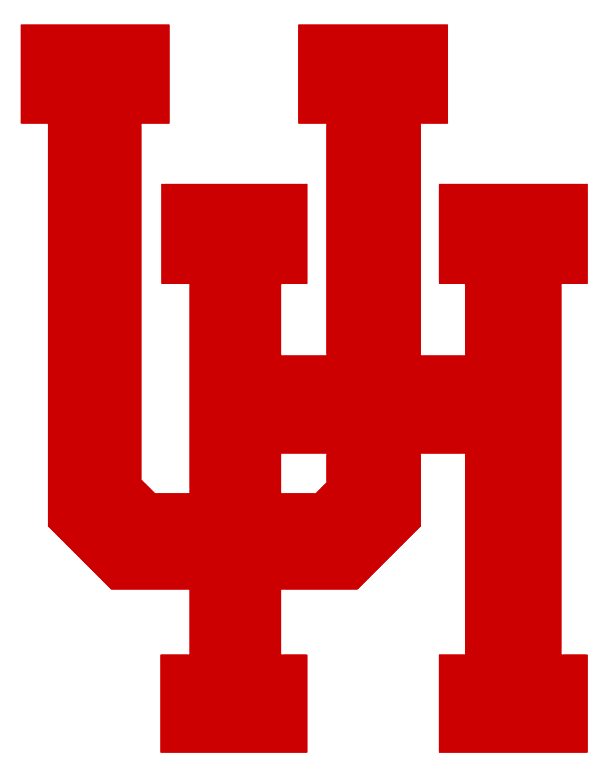

NIT, Second Round
- Conference: Southwest Conference
- Record: 18–13 (10–6 SWC)
- Head coach: Pat Foster (2nd season)
- Assistant coach: Alvin Brooks
- Home arena: Hofheinz Pavilion

1987–88 Southwest Conference men's basketball standings
| | Conf. | | | | Overall |
| Team | W | | L | PCT | W | | L | PCT |
|---|---|---|---|---|---|---|---|---|
| SMU † | 12 | – | 4 | .750 | 28 | – | 7 | .800 |
| Arkansas | 11 | – | 5 | .688 | 21 | – | 9 | .700 |
| Baylor | 11 | – | 5 | .688 | 23 | – | 11 | .676 |
| Houston | 10 | – | 6 | .625 | 18 | – | 13 | .581 |
| Texas | 10 | – | 6 | .625 | 16 | – | 13 | .552 |
| Texas A&M | 8 | – | 8 | .500 | 16 | – | 15 | .516 |
| Texas Tech | 4 | – | 12 | .250 | 9 | – | 19 | .321 |
| TCU | 3 | – | 13 | .188 | 9 | – | 19 | .321 |
| Rice | 3 | – | 13 | .188 | 6 | – | 21 | .222 |
† 1988 SWC tournament winner Rankings from AP Poll

The 1987–88 Houston Cougars men's basketball team represented the University of Houston as a member of the Southwest Conference during the 1987–88 NCAA men's basketball season. The head coach was Pat Foster, and the team played its home games at the Hofheinz Pavilion in Houston, Texas.

== Roster ==
1987–88 Houston Cougars men's basketball team
Players
Coaches

| Pos. | # | Name | Height | Weight | Year | Previous school | Hometown |
|---|---|---|---|---|---|---|---|
| G | 4 | Randy Brown | 6 ft 2 in (1.88 m) | 185 lb (84 kg) | So | Collins HS | Chicago, Illinois |
| F | 30 | Craig Upchurch | 6 ft 8 in (2.03 m) | — | Fr |
| C | 33 | Rolando Ferreira | 7 ft 1 in (2.16 m) | 235 lb (107 kg) | Sr | Colegro Objectivo | São Paulo, Brazil |

Head coach

- Pat Foster

Assistant coach(es)

- Alvin Brooks

Legend

- (C) Team captain
- (S) Suspended
- (I) Ineligible
- (W) Walk-on
- Injured
- Current redshirt

== Schedule and results ==
| Date time, TV | Rank^{#} | Opponent^{#} | Result | Record | Site (attendance) city, state |
Regular season
| Nov 27, 1987* | | Sam Houston State | W 85–71 | 1–0 | Hofheinz Pavilion; Houston, Texas |
| Dec 5, 1987* | | at Pan American | W 65–59 | 2–0 | UTPA Fieldhouse; Edinburg, Texas |
| Dec 7, 1987* | | Arkansas State | W 80–72 | 3–0 | Hofheinz Pavilion; Houston, Texas |
| Dec 12, 1987* | | No. 17 UNLV | L 69–89 | 3–1 | Hofheinz Pavilion; Houston, Texas |
| Dec 17, 1987* | | at Minnesota | L 60–65 | 3–2 | Williams Arena; Minneapolis, Minnesota |
| Dec 20, 1987* | | vs. Drexel; Spindletop Classic | W 91–88 | 4–2 | Montagne Center; Beaumont, Texas |
| Dec 21, 1987* | | at Lamar; Spindletop Classic | W 71–67 | 5–2 | Montagne Center; Beaumont, Texas |
| Jan 2, 1988 | | at Texas | L 63–65 | 5–3 (0–1) | Frank Erwin Center; Austin, Texas |
| Jan 6, 1988* | | at New Orleans | L 64–71 | 5–4 | Lakefront Arena; New Orleans, Louisiana |
| Jan 9, 1988 | | Texas Tech | W 72–67 | 6–4 (1–1) | Hofheinz Pavilion; Houston, Texas |
| Jan 13, 1988* | | at Southwestern Louisiana | L 101–102 ^{2OT} | 6–5 | Cajundome; Lafayette, Louisiana |
| Jan 16, 1988 | | at TCU | W 77–57 | 7–5 (2–1) | Daniel-Meyer Coliseum; Fort Worth, Texas |
| Jan 19, 1988 | | SMU | L 65–69 | 7–6 (2–2) | Hofheinz Pavilion; Houston, Texas |
| Jan 23, 1988 | | Texas A&M | W 67–63 | 8–6 (3–2) | Hofheinz Pavilion; Houston, Texas |
| Jan 27, 1988 | | at Baylor | L 59–77 | 8–7 (3–3) | Heart O' Texas Coliseum; Waco, Texas |
| Jan 30, 1988 | | at Arkansas | L 62–71 | 8–8 (3–4) | Barnhill Arena; Fayetteville, Arkansas |
| Feb 3, 1988 | | Rice | W 84–67 | 9–8 (4–4) | Hofheinz Pavilion; Houston, Texas |
| Feb 6, 1988* | | at Louisville | L 69–73 | 9–9 | Freedom Hall; Louisville, Kentucky |
| Feb 7, 1988* | | Virginia | W 81–58 | 10–9 | Hofheinz Pavilion; Houston, Texas |
| Feb 10, 1988 | | at Texas Tech | W 72–68 | 11–9 (5–4) | Lubbock Municipal Coliseum; Lubbock, Texas |
| Feb 13, 1988 | | Texas | W 62–51 | 12–9 (6–4) | Hofheinz Pavilion; Houston, Texas |
| Feb 17, 1988 | | TCU | W 68–47 | 13–9 (7–4) | Hofheinz Pavilion; Houston, Texas |
| Feb 20, 1988 | | at SMU | L 84–87 | 13–10 (7–5) | Moody Coliseum; University Park, Texas |
| Feb 24, 1988 | | at Texas A&M | W 73–70 | 14–10 (8–5) | G. Rollie White Coliseum; College Station, Texas |
| Feb 27, 1988 | | Baylor | L 73–88 | 14–11 (8–6) | Hofheinz Pavilion; Houston, Texas |
| Mar 3, 1988 | | Arkansas | W 82–77 | 15–11 (9–6) | Hofheinz Pavilion; Houston, Texas |
| Mar 5, 1988 | | at Rice | W 81–65 | 16–11 (10–6) | Rice Gymnasium; Houston, Texas |
SWC tournament
| Mar 11, 1988* | (5) | vs. (4) Texas; Quarterfinals | W 72–57 | 17–11 | Reunion Arena; Dallas, Texas |
| Mar 12, 1988* | (5) | vs. (1) SMU; Semifinals | L 76–98 | 17–12 | Reunion Arena; Dallas, Texas |
NIT
| Mar 17, 1988* | | Fordham; First round | W 69–61 | 18–12 | Hofheinz Pavilion; Houston, Texas |
| Mar 22, 1988* | | at Colorado State; Second round | L 61–71 | 18–13 | Moby Arena; Fort Collins, Colorado |
*Non-conference game. ^{#}Rankings from AP poll. (#) Tournament seedings in parentheses.
