= 1987–88 SMU Mustangs men's basketball team =

American college basketball season

1987–88 SMU Mustangs men's basketball

SWC tournament champions SWC regular season champions

NCAA tournament, second round, L 79–94 vs. Duke
- Conference: Southwest Conference
- Record: 28–7 (12–4 SWC)
- Head coach: Dave Bliss (8th season)
- Assistant coach: Paul Graham (6th season)
- Home arena: Moody Coliseum

1987–88 Southwest Conference men's basketball standings
	Conf.				Overall
Team	W		L	PCT	W		L	PCT
SMU †	12	–	4	.750	28	–	7	.800
Arkansas	11	–	5	.688	21	–	9	.700
Baylor	11	–	5	.688	23	–	11	.676
Houston	10	–	6	.625	18	–	13	.581
Texas	10	–	6	.625	16	–	13	.552
Texas A&M	8	–	8	.500	16	–	15	.516
Texas Tech	4	–	12	.250	9	–	19	.321
TCU	3	–	13	.188	9	–	19	.321
Rice	3	–	13	.188	6	–	21	.222
† 1988 SWC tournament winner Rankings from AP Poll

The 1987–88 SMU Mustangs men's basketball team represented Southern Methodist University during the 1987–88 men's college basketball season. There, they defeated Notre Dame to advance to the Second Round. In the Second Round, they lost to the #2 seed Duke, 94–79.

== Roster ==
1987–88 SMU Mustangs men's basketball team
Players
Coaches

Pos.	#	Name	Height	Weight	Year	Previous school	Hometown
G	14	Carlton McKinney	6 ft 4 in (1.93 m)	—	Sr	Tulsa
G	22	Kato Armstrong	5 ft 11 in (1.8 m)	—	Jr

Head coach

- Dave Bliss (Cornell)

Assistant coach(es)

- Paul Graham (North Texas)

Legend

- (C) Team captain
- (S) Suspended
- (I) Ineligible
- (W) Walk-on
- Injured
- Current redshirt

Roster

== Schedule ==
Date time, TV	Rank^{#}	Opponent^{#}	Result	Record	Site city, state
Non-conference regular season
November 28*		vs. James Madison	W 121–89	1–0	
November 29*		at Missouri State; Mazzio's Pizza Classic	W 69–58	2–0	Hammons Student Center; Springfield, Missouri
December 3*		No. 7 Florida	W 82–76	3–0	Moody Coliseum; University Park, Texas
December 5*		Alabama State	W 90–66	4–0	Moody Coliseum; University Park, Texas
December 8*		Prairie View	W 91–75	5–0	Moody Coliseum; University Park, Texas
December 12*		at No. 5 North Carolina	L 74–90	5–1	Dean Smith Center; Chapel Hill, NC
December 14*		at South Florida	W 87–66	6–1	Sun Dome; Tampa, Florida
December 19*		Alcorn State	W 116–85	7–1	Moody Coliseum; University Park, Texas
December 21*		Santa Clara	W 78–70	8–1	Moody Coliseum; University Park, Texas
December 27*		vs. Louisville; Rainbow Classic	L 79–87	8–2	Stan Sheriff Center; Honolulu, Hawaii
December 28*		vs. Creighton	W 88–51	9–2	
December 29*		vs. Texas A&M	W 89–66	10–2	
January 2*		Morgan State	W 96–65	11–2	Moody Coliseum; University Park, Texas
SWC Regular Season
January 6		at Texas A&M	L 53–58	11–3 (0–1)	G. Rollie White Coliseum; College Station, Texas
January 9		Baylor	W 97–93 ^{3OT}	12–3 (1–1)	Moody Coliseum; University Park, Texas
January 13		Arkansas	L 83–85 ^{OT}	12–4 (1–2)	Moody Coliseum; University Park, Texas
January 16		at Rice	W 72–60	13–4 (2–2)	Tudor Fieldhouse; Houston, Texas
January 19		at Houston	W 69–65	14–4 (3–2)	Hofheinz Pavilion; Houston, Texas
January 23		Texas Tech	W 80–75	15–4 (4–2)	Moody Coliseum; University Park, Texas
January 27		Texas	W 75–70	16–4 (5–2)	Moody Coliseum; University Park, Texas
January 30		at TCU	W 51–48	17–4 (6–2)	Daniel-Meyer Coliseum; Fort Worth, Texas
February 6		Texas A&M	W 94–71	18–4 (7–2)	Moody Coliseum; University Park, Texas
February 10		at Baylor	L 57–71	18–5 (7–3)	Heart O' Texas Coliseum; Waco, Texas
February 13		at Arkansas	W 73–63	19–5 (8–3)	Barnhill Arena; Fayetteville, Arkansas
February 17		Rice	W 86–68	20–5 (9–3)	Moody Coliseum; University Park, Texas
February 20		Houston	W 87–84	21–5 (10–3)	Moody Coliseum; University Park, Texas
February 24		at Texas Tech	W 82–80	22–5 (11–3)	Lubbock Municipal Coliseum; Lubbock, Texas
February 27		at Texas	L 69–76	22–6 (11–4)	Frank Erwin Center; Austin, Texas
March 2		TCU	W 87–54	23–6 (12–4)	Moody Coliseum; University Park, Texas
March 5*		Chicago State	W 83–66	24–6 (12–4)	Moody Coliseum; University Park, Texas
SWC tournament
March 11		vs. TCU	W 86–66	25–6 (12–4)	Reunion Arena; Dallas, Texas
March 12		vs. Houston	W 98–76	26–6 (12–4)	Reunion Arena; Dallas, Texas
March 13		vs. Baylor; Championship game	W 75–64	27–6 (12–4)	Reunion Arena; Dallas, Texas
1988 NCAA tournament
March 17*	(7 E)	vs. (10 E) Notre Dame; First round	W 83–75	28–6 (12–4)	Dean Smith Center; Chapel Hill, NC
March 19*; CBS		vs. No. 5 Duke; Second round	L 79–94	28–7 (12–4)	Dean Smith Center (20,505); Chapel Hill, NC
*Non-conference game. ^{#}Rankings from AP Poll. (#) Tournament seedings in parentheses.
