= 1987–88 Baylor Bears basketball team =

American college basketball season

1987–88 Baylor Bears men's basketball

NCAA tournament, Round of 64
- Conference: Southwest Conference
- Record: 23–11 (11–5 SWC)
- Head coach: Gene Iba (3rd season)
- Home arena: Heart O' Texas Coliseum

1987–88 Southwest Conference men's basketball standings
	Conf.				Overall
Team	W		L	PCT	W		L	PCT
SMU †	12	–	4	.750	28	–	7	.800
Arkansas	11	–	5	.688	21	–	9	.700
Baylor	11	–	5	.688	23	–	11	.676
Houston	10	–	6	.625	18	–	13	.581
Texas	10	–	6	.625	16	–	13	.552
Texas A&M	8	–	8	.500	16	–	15	.516
Texas Tech	4	–	12	.250	9	–	19	.321
TCU	3	–	13	.188	9	–	19	.321
Rice	3	–	13	.188	6	–	21	.222
† 1988 SWC tournament winner Rankings from AP Poll

The 1987–88 Baylor Bears men's basketball team represented Baylor University as a member of the Southwest Conference during the 1987–88 men's college basketball season. The team was led by head coach Gene Iba and played their home games at Heart O' Texas Coliseum in Waco, Texas. After finishing tied for second in the SWC regular season standings, the Bears lost to SMU in the championship game of the SWC tournament. Baylor received an at-large bid to the NCAA tournament – the program's first appearance in 38 years. As No. 8 seed in the Midwest region, the Bears were defeated by No. 9 seed Memphis State in opening round to finish the season with a record of 23–11 (11–5 SWC).

Senior guard Micheal Williams finished his career as the all-time leader in steals (including the top two single-season performances) and assists at Baylor. He also finished second on the career scoring list. Williams was taken by the Detroit Pistons in the second round of the 1988 NBA draft. Senior forward Darryl Middleton finished his career third all-time on the scoring list (including the single-season record for points) and fourth in rebounds. Middleton was drafted by the Atlanta Hawks in the third round of the 1988 NBA draft.

== Roster ==
1987–88 Baylor Bears men's basketball team
Players
Coaches

Pos.	#	Name	Height	Weight	Year	Previous school	Hometown
PG	24	Micheal Williams	6 ft 2 in (1.88 m)	170 lb (77 kg)	Sr	David W. Carter	Dallas, Texas
PF	44	Darryl Middleton	6 ft 8 in (2.03 m)	230 lb (104 kg)	Sr	William Cullen Bryant	Queens, New York

Head coach

- Gene Iba

Assistant coach(es)

Legend

- (C) Team captain
- (S) Suspended
- (I) Ineligible
- (W) Walk-on
- Injured
- Current redshirt

== Schedule and results ==
Date time, TV	Rank^{#}	Opponent^{#}	Result	Record	Site city, state
Non-conference Regular season
Nov 27, 1987*		vs. Illinois; Maui Invitational	L 50–73	0–1	Lahaina Civic Center (1,200); Maui, Hawaii
Nov 28, 1987*		vs. Nebraska; Maui Invitational	W 82–79	1–1	Lahaina Civic Center; Maui, Hawaii
Nov 29, 1987*		vs. Stanford; Maui Invitational	L 56–69	1–2	Lahaina Civic Center; Maui, Hawaii
Dec 1, 1987*		at North Texas State	W 72–63	2–2	Super Pit; Denton, Texas
Dec 3, 1987*		Colorado State	W 53–44	3–2	Heart O' Texas Coliseum; Waco, Texas
Dec 5, 1987*		Oklahoma State	W 67–55	4–2	Heart O' Texas Coliseum; Waco, Texas
Dec 8, 1987*		at Tulsa	W 69–67	5–2	Tulsa Convention Center; Tulsa, Oklahoma
Dec 11, 1987*		vs. Mississippi Valley State	W 74–72	6–2	
Dec 12, 1987*		at Arkansas State	L 43–62	6–3	Convocation Center; Jonesboro, Arkansas
Dec 19, 1987*		at Marshall	L 68–79	6–4	Cam Henderson Center; Huntington, West Virginia
Dec 22, 1987*		Coppin State	W 67–64	7–4	Heart O' Texas Coliseum; Waco, Texas
Dec 30, 1987*		Northwestern State	W 70–54	8–4	Heart O' Texas Coliseum; Waco, Texas
Jan 2, 1988*		Alabama State	W 111–72	9–4	Heart O' Texas Coliseum; Waco, Texas
SWC Regular season
Jan 6, 1988		at TCU	W 75–61	10–4 (1–0)	Daniel-Meyer Coliseum; Fort Worth, Texas
Jan 9, 1988		at SMU	L 93–97 ^{3OT}	10–5 (1–1)	Moody Coliseum; University Park, Texas
Jan 13, 1988		Texas A&M	L 57–58	10–6 (1–2)	Heart O' Texas Coliseum; Waco, Texas
Jan 20, 1988		at Arkansas	L 62–70	10–7 (1–3)	Barnhill Arena; Fayetteville, Arkansas
Jan 23, 1988		Rice	W 84–68	11–7 (2–3)	Heart O' Texas Coliseum; Waco, Texas
Jan 27, 1988		Houston	W 77–59	12–7 (3–3)	Heart O' Texas Coliseum; Waco, Texas
SWC tournament
Mar 11, 1988*		vs. Texas Tech; Quarterfinals	W 54–53	21–9	Reunion Arena; Dallas, Texas
Mar 12, 1988*		vs. Arkansas; Semifinals	W 74–73	22–9	Reunion Arena; Dallas, Texas
Mar 13, 1988*		vs. SMU; Championship game	L 64–75	23–10	Reunion Arena; Dallas, Texas
NCAA tournament
Mar 17, 1988*	(8 MW)	vs. (9 MW) Memphis State; First Round	L 60–75	23–11	Joyce Center; South Bend, Indiana
*Non-conference game. ^{#}Rankings from AP Poll. (#) Tournament seedings in parentheses. MW=Midwest.

== 1988 NBA draft ==
Round	Pick	Player	NBA club
2	48	Micheal Williams	Detroit Pistons
3	68	Darryl Middleton	Atlanta Hawks
