= 1987–88 Arkansas Razorbacks men's basketball team =

American college basketball season

1987–88 Arkansas Razorbacks men's basketball

NCAA tournament, Round of 64
- Conference: Southwest Conference
- Record: 21–9 (11–5 SWC)
- Head coach: Nolan Richardson (3rd season)
- Assistant coaches: Mike Anderson; Scott Edgar
- Home arena: Barnhill Arena

1987–88 Southwest Conference men's basketball standings
	Conf.				Overall
Team	W		L	PCT	W		L	PCT
SMU †	12	–	4	.750	28	–	7	.800
Arkansas	11	–	5	.688	21	–	9	.700
Baylor	11	–	5	.688	23	–	11	.676
Houston	10	–	6	.625	18	–	13	.581
Texas	10	–	6	.625	16	–	13	.552
Texas A&M	8	–	8	.500	16	–	15	.516
Texas Tech	4	–	12	.250	9	–	19	.321
TCU	3	–	13	.188	9	–	19	.321
Rice	3	–	13	.188	6	–	21	.222
† 1988 SWC tournament winner Rankings from AP Poll

The 1987–88 Arkansas Razorbacks men's basketball team represented the University of Arkansas in the 1987–88 college basketball season. The head coach was Nolan Richardson, serving for his third year. The team played its home games in Barnhill Arena in Fayetteville, Arkansas.

== Roster ==
1987–88 Arkansas Razorbacks men's basketball team
Players
Coaches

Pos.	#	Name	Height	Weight	Year	Hometown
G	12	Keith Wilson	6 ft 3 in (1.91 m)	170 lb (77 kg)	Jr	Fort Smith, Arkansas
G	22	Cannon Whitby	6 ft 0 in (1.83 m)	165 lb (75 kg)	So	Troy, Tennessee
C	55	Mario Credit	6 ft 9 in (2.06 m)	240 lb (109 kg)	So	Kansas City, Kansas

Head coach

- Nolan Richardson (UTEP)

Assistant coach(es)

Legend

- (C) Team captain
- (S) Suspended
- (I) Ineligible
- (W) Walk-on
- Injured
- Current redshirt

== Schedule and results ==
Date time, TV	Rank^{#}	Opponent^{#}	Result	Record	Site city, state
Exhibition Season
Nov 21, 1987*		Italian National Team	L 70–84		Barnhill Arena; Fayetteville, AR
Non-conference regular season
Nov 27, 1987*		vs. Chicago State	W 78–68	1–0	Pine Bluff, AR
Nov 29, 1987*		at Tulsa	W 77–55	1–1	Tulsa Convention Center; Tulsa, OK
Dec 3, 1987*		vs. Northwestern State	W 77–55	2–1	Little Rock, AR
Dec 5, 1987*		SW Missouri State	W 53–47	3–1	Barnhill Arena; Fayetteville, AR
Dec 9, 1987*		vs. Ole Miss	W 79–40	4–1	Pine Bluff, AR
Dec 12, 1987*		Virginia	W 66–52	5–1	Barnhill Arena; Fayetteville, AR
Dec 15, 1987*		Alcorn State	W 101–55	6–1	Barnhill Arena; Fayetteville, AR
Dec 19, 1987*		Mississippi Valley State	W 91–71	7–1	Barnhill Arena; Fayetteville, AR
Dec 23, 1987*		vs. Alabama	W 80–55	8–1	Barton Coliseum; Little Rock, AR
Dec 30, 1987*		at Maryland	L 61–88	8–2	Cole Fieldhouse; College Park, MD
Jan 2, 1988*		vs. Coastal Carolina	W 81–59	9–2	Little Rock, AR
SWC Regular Season
Jan 6, 1988		Texas	W 91–62	10–2 (1–0)	Barnhill Arena; Fayetteville, AR
Jan 9, 1988		TCU	W 96–53	11–2 (2–0)	Barnhill Arena; Fayetteville, AR
Jan 13, 1988		at SMU	W 85–83 ^{OT}	12–2 (3–0)	Moody Coliseum; University Park, TX
Jan 16, 1988		at Texas A&M	L 67–74	12–3 (3–1)	G. Rollie White Coliseum; College Station, TX
Jan 20, 1988		Baylor	W 70–62	13–3 (4–1)	Barnhill Arena; Fayetteville, AR
Feb 13, 1988		SMU	L 63–73	17–5 (8–3)	Barnhill Arena; Fayetteville, AR
Feb 17, 1988		Texas A&M	W 79–58	18–5 (9–3)	Barnhill Arena; Fayetteville, AR
Feb 20, 1988		at Baylor	L 57–58	18–6 (9–4)	Heart O' Texas Coliseum; Waco, TX
Mar 6, 1988		at Texas Tech	W 75–65	20–7 (11–5)	Lubbock Municipal Coliseum; Lubbock, TX
SWC tournament
Mar 11, 1988*		vs. Texas A&M; SWC Tournament Quarterfinal	W 76–64	21–7	Reunion Arena; Dallas, TX
Mar 12, 1988*		vs. Baylor; SWC Tournament Semifinal	L 73–74	21–8	Reunion Arena; Dallas, TX
NCAA tournament
Mar 18, 1988*	(11 SE)	vs. (6 SE) Villanova; Southeast Regional First Round	L 74–82	21–9	Riverfront Coliseum; Cincinnati, OH
*Non-conference game. ^{#}Rankings from AP Poll. (#) Tournament seedings in parentheses.
