= Hersey Hawkins =

American basketball player (born 1966)

Personal information
- Born: September 29, 1966 (age 60) Chicago, Illinois, U.S.
- Listed height: 6 ft 3 in (1.91 m)
- Listed weight: 200 lb (91 kg)

Career information
- High school: Westinghouse (Chicago, Illinois)
- College: Bradley (1984–1988)
- NBA draft: 1988: 1st round, 6th overall pick
- Drafted by: Los Angeles Clippers
- Playing career: 1988–2001
- Position: Shooting guard
- Number: 32, 33, 3

Career history
- 1988–1993: Philadelphia 76ers
- 1993–1995: Charlotte Hornets
- 1995–1999: Seattle SuperSonics
- 1999–2000: Chicago Bulls
- 2000–2001: Charlotte Hornets

Career highlights
- NBA All-Star (1991); NBA All-Rookie First Team (1989); National college player of the year (1988); Consensus first-team All-American (1988); NCAA scoring champion (1988); 2× MVC Player of the Year (1987, 1988); 3× First-team All-MVC (1986–1988); MVC tournament MVP (1988); No. 33 retired by Bradley Braves

Career NBA statistics
- Points: 14,470 (14.7 ppg)
- Rebounds: 3,554 (3.6 rpg)
- Steals: 1,622 (1.7 spg)
- Stats at NBA.com
- Stats at Basketball Reference
- Collegiate Basketball Hall of Fame
Medals
Men's basketball
Representing United States
Summer Olympics
| Bronze medal – third place | 1988 Seoul | Team competition |

Hersey R. Hawkins Jr. (born September 29, 1966) is an American former professional basketball player in the National Basketball Association (NBA). After starring at George Westinghouse College Prep, the 6-foot-3-inch (1.91 m) shooting guard played college basketball for the Bradley Braves. Hawkins played for four teams throughout his 12-year NBA career.

== College ==
Hersey spent four seasons as the starting shooting guard at Bradley University, starting all 125 games the Braves played and finishing with 3,008 points. At the time of his graduation in 1988, he was the fourth-leading scorer in NCAA Division I history and is currently 10th. In 1986–87, he finished fifth in NCAA Division I in scoring with 27.2 points per game, following that season with a historic campaign, averaging 36.3 points per game in 1987–88. Before being drafted into the NBA, he was a member of the last collegiate USA men's national basketball team at the 1988 Summer Olympics in Seoul coached by John Thompson. They disappointingly finished with the bronze medal after losing to the all-professional Soviet Union in the semifinals as Hawkins was injured, depriving the U.S. team of his outside shooting and overall scoring ability.

== Career in the NBA ==
=== Philadelphia 76ers ===
He was then drafted 6th overall by the Los Angeles Clippers in first round of the 1988 NBA draft, but his rights were immediately traded to the Philadelphia 76ers for the draft rights to former 1988 Olympic teammate Charles Smith. On the 76ers, "Hawk" was the second scoring option after Charles Barkley. Hawkins earned NBA All-Rookie First Team Honors in 1989. In 1991, he averaged 22.1 points and appeared in the NBA All-Star Game. In a game against the Boston Celtics, he had 9 steals. He also scored a career-high 43 points in a game against the Orlando Magic.

=== Charlotte Hornets ===
In 1993, Hawkins was traded to the Charlotte Hornets for Dana Barros, Sidney Green and draft picks. In 1994, he grabbed a career-high 14 rebounds against the Houston Rockets. Hawkins wore #32 with the Hornets during the 1993–94 season since Alonzo Mourning wore #33. Next season, he would change his jersey number to #3.

=== Seattle SuperSonics ===
After two productive seasons in Charlotte, Hawkins and David Wingate were traded to the Seattle SuperSonics for Kendall Gill. In 1996, he played a key role, complementing Gary Payton, Detlef Schrempf and Shawn Kemp on a Sonics team that made it to the NBA Finals but lost 2–4 to his hometown team, the Chicago Bulls. He won the NBA Sportsmanship Award in his final season in Seattle.

=== Chicago Bulls ===
On August 12, 1999, Hawkins was traded along with James Cotton to the Bulls for Brent Barry, but his one-year tenure in Chicago was marred by injury, and he only averaged 7.9 points per game in 61 games.

=== Return to Charlotte ===
He returned to Charlotte as a free agent in 2000 for his final season, and he retired in 2001 with 14,470 career points.

== Career statistics ==
Legend
| GP | Games played | GS | Games started | MPG | Minutes per game |
| FG% | Field goal percentage | 3P% | 3-point field goal percentage | FT% | Free throw percentage |
| RPG | Rebounds per game | APG | Assists per game | SPG | Steals per game |
| BPG | Blocks per game | PPG | Points per game | **Bold** | Career high |
| * | Led the league |

=== NBA ===
==== Regular season ====
| Year | Team | GP | GS | MPG | FG% | 3P% | FT% | RPG | APG | SPG | BPG | PPG |
|---|---|---|---|---|---|---|---|---|---|---|---|---|
| 1988–89 | Philadelphia | 79 | 79 | 32.6 | .455 | .428 | .831 | 2.8 | 3.0 | 1.5 | **0.5** | 15.1 |
| 1989–90 | Philadelphia | **82** | **82** | 34.8 | .460 | .420 | .888 | 3.7 | 3.2 | 1.6 | 0.3 | 18.5 |
| 1990–91 | Philadelphia | 80 | 80 | **38.9** | .472 | .400 | .871 | 3.9 | 3.7 | **2.2** | **0.5** | **22.1** |
| 1991–92 | Philadelphia | 81 | 81 | 37.2 | .462 | .397 | .874 | 3.3 | 3.1 | 1.9 | **0.5** | 19.0 |
| 1992–93 | Philadelphia | 81 | 81 | 36.8 | .470 | .397 | .860 | 4.3 | **3.9** | 1.7 | 0.4 | 20.3 |
| 1993–94 | Charlotte | **82** | **82** | 32.3 | .460 | .332 | .862 | **4.6** | 2.6 | 1.6 | 0.3 | 14.4 |
| 1994–95 | Charlotte | **82*** | **82*** | 33.3 | **.482** | **.440** | .867 | 3.8 | 3.2 | 1.5 | 0.2 | 14.3 |
| 1995–96 | Seattle | **82** | **82*** | 34.4 | .473 | .384 | .874 | 3.6 | 2.7 | 1.8 | 0.2 | 15.6 |
| 1996–97 | Seattle | **82** | **82*** | 33.6 | .464 | .403 | .875 | 3.9 | 3.0 | 1.9 | 0.1 | 13.9 |
| 1997–98 | Seattle | **82*** | **82*** | 31.7 | .440 | .415 | .868 | 4.1 | 2.7 | 1.8 | 0.2 | 10.5 |
| 1998–99 | Seattle | 50* | 34 | 32.9 | .419 | .306 | **.902** | 4.0 | 2.5 | 1.6 | 0.4 | 10.3 |
| 1999–00 | Chicago | 61 | 49 | 26.6 | .424 | .390 | .899 | 2.9 | 2.2 | 1.2 | 0.2 | 7.9 |
| 2000–01 | Charlotte | 59 | 0 | 11.5 | .409 | .370 | .857 | 1.4 | 1.2 | 0.6 | 0.2 | 3.1 |
| Career | | 983 | 896 | 32.6 | .461 | .394 | .870 | 3.6 | 2.9 | 1.7 | 0.3 | 14.7 |
| All-Star | | 1 | 0 | 14.0 | .600 | .000 | – | 0.0 | 1.0 | 0.0 | 0.0 | 6.0 |

==== Playoffs ====
| Year | Team | GP | GS | MPG | FG% | 3P% | FT% | RPG | APG | SPG | BPG | PPG |
|---|---|---|---|---|---|---|---|---|---|---|---|---|
| 1989 | Philadelphia | 3 | 3 | 24.0 | .125 | .000 | **1.000** | 1.7 | 1.3 | 1.0 | 0.3 | 2.7 |
| 1990 | Philadelphia | 10 | 10 | **41.5** | **.497** | .389 | .937 | 3.1 | **3.6** | 1.2 | 0.7 | **23.5** |
| 1991 | Philadelphia | 8 | 8 | 41.1 | .465 | **.538** | .937 | **5.8** | 3.4 | **2.5** | **1.3** | 20.9 |
| 1995 | Charlotte | 4 | 4 | 32.5 | .406 | .308 | .882 | 5.3 | 2.0 | 1.5 | 0.5 | 11.3 |
| 1996 | Seattle | **21** | **21** | 34.0 | .452 | .344 | .895 | 3.0 | 2.2 | 1.3 | 0.2 | 12.3 |
| 1997 | Seattle | 12 | 12 | 40.3 | .470 | .458 | .914 | 4.5 | 2.8 | **2.5** | 0.3 | 15.3 |
| 1998 | Seattle | 10 | 10 | 33.7 | .466 | .395 | .875 | 5.7 | **3.6** | 1.8 | 0.1 | 13.4 |
| 2001 | Charlotte | 6 | 0 | 8.3 | .375 | .250 | .714 | 1.5 | 0.7 | 0.5 | 0.0 | 2.0 |
| Career | | 74 | 68 | 34.2 | .455 | .396 | .907 | 3.9 | 2.6 | 1.6 | 0.4 | 14.1 |

=== College ===
| Year | Team | GP | GS | MPG | FG% | 3P% | FT% | RPG | APG | SPG | BPG | PPG |
|---|---|---|---|---|---|---|---|---|---|---|---|---|
| 1984–85 | Bradley | 30 | 30 | 37.4 | **.581** | – | .771 | 6.1 | 2.7 | 1.7 | .6 | 14.6 |
| 1985–86 | Bradley | **35** | 30 | 36.9 | .542 | – | .768 | 5.7 | 3.0 | 1.9 | .7 | 18.7 |
| 1986–87 | Bradley | 29 | 29 | 38.0 | .533 | .295 | .793 | 6.7 | **3.6** | 2.0 | .4 | 27.2 |
| 1987–88 | Bradley | 31 | **31** | **38.8** | .524 | **.394** | **.848** | **7.8** | **3.6** | **2.6** | **.8** | **36.3** |
| Career | | 125 | 120 | 37.7 | .539 | .362 | .806 | 6.5 | 3.2 | 2.1 | .6 | 24.1 |

== Post-playing career ==
Hawkins was named as an assistant by head coach Ty Amundsen for the 2006–2007 season at Estrella Foothills High School varsity basketball in Goodyear, Arizona. He also came to the Hoopfest in 2009. He is currently the Player Development Director for the Portland Trail Blazers.

Hawkins is married with three sons. His son Corey, who holds the Arizona high school record for most points in a career, now plays for the Idaho Stampede of the NBA Development League. He played for Arizona State from 2010 to 2011 and UC Davis from 2012 to 2015. His son Brandon played college basketball at University of the Pacific before finishing his career at Portland State. His son Devon played basketball at West Linn High School in Oregon and Clark College in Washington. Former NFL offensive lineman Flozell Adams is Hersey's cousin.

== See also ==
- List of National Basketball Association career steals leaders
- List of National Basketball Association career free throw percentage leaders
- List of National Basketball Association single-game steals leaders
- List of NCAA Division I men's basketball players with 60 or more points in a game
- List of NCAA Division I men's basketball career scoring leaders
- List of NCAA Division I men's basketball season scoring leaders
