= 1987–88 Utah State Aggies men's basketball team =

American college basketball season

1987–88 Utah State Aggies men's basketball

PCAA tournament champions

NCAA tournament, first round
- Conference: Pacific Coast Athletic Association
- Record: 21–10 (13–5 PCAA)
- Head coach: Rod Tueller
- Home arena: Dee Glen Smith Spectrum

1987–88 Pacific Coast Athletic Association men's basketball standings
	Conf.				Overall
Team	W		L	PCT	W		L	PCT
No. 12 UNLV	15	–	3	.833	28	–	6	.824
UC Santa Barbara	13	–	5	.722	22	–	8	.733
Utah State †	13	–	5	.722	21	–	10	.677
Long Beach State	11	–	7	.611	17	–	12	.586
UC Irvine	9	–	9	.500	16	–	14	.533
New Mexico State	8	–	10	.444	16	–	16	.500
San Jose State	8	–	10	.444	14	–	15	.483
Cal State Fullerton	7	–	11	.389	12	–	17	.414
Fresno State	6	–	12	.333	9	–	19	.321
Pacific	0	–	18	.000	5	–	24	.172
† 1988 PCAA tournament winner

The 1987–88 Utah State Aggies men's basketball team represented Utah State University as a member of the Pacific Coast Athletic Association during the 1987–88 men's college basketball season. After winning the PCAA tournament, the Aggies received an automatic bid to the NCAA tournament where they lost in the first round to Vanderbilt.

== Roster ==
1987–88 Utah State Aggies men's basketball team
Players	Coaches
Pos. / # / Name / Height / Weight / Year / Hometown; F / 30 / Dan Conway / 6 ft 8 in (2.03 m) / 210 lb (95 kg) / So / Rexburg, Idaho	Head coach: Rod Tueller; Assistant coach(es) Legend: (C) Team captain; (S) Suspended; (I) Ineligible; (W) Walk-on; Injured; Current redshirt; Roster

== Schedule and results ==
Date time, TV	Rank^{#}	Opponent^{#}	Result	Record	Site city, state
Regular season
Nov 27, 1987*		at Utah	L 64–77	0–1	Jon M. Huntsman Center; Salt Lake City, Utah
Dec 1, 1987*		BYU	L 92–96	0–2	Dee Glen Smith Spectrum; Logan, Utah
Dec 5, 1987*		Utah	W 76–70 ^{2OT}	1–2	Dee Glen Smith Spectrum; Logan, Utah
Dec 11, 1987*		vs. Murray State; Longhorn Invitational	W 74–57	2–2	Frank Erwin Center; Austin, Texas
Dec 12, 1987*		at Texas; Longhorn Invitational	W 80–75	3–2	Frank Erwin Center; Austin, Texas
Dec 19, 1987*		at BYU	L 112–121 ^{OT}	3–3	Marriott Center; Provo, Utah
Dec 22, 1987*		at Weber State	W 107–93	4–3	Dee Events Center; Ogden, Utah
Dec 29, 1987*		Weber State	W 92–69	5–3	Dee Glen Smith Spectrum; Logan, Utah
Dec 31, 1987*		Kansas State	L 69–81	5–4	Dee Glen Smith Spectrum; Logan, Utah
Jan 2, 1988		at Pacific	W 78–71	6–4 (1–0)	Alex G. Spanos Center; Stockton, California
Jan 4, 1988		at Fresno State	W 90–68	7–4 (2–0)	Selland Arena; Fresno, California
Jan 7, 1988		Long Beach State	W 86–81	8–4 (3–0)	Dee Glen Smith Spectrum; Logan, Utah
Jan 9, 1988		New Mexico State	W 53–52	9–4 (4–0)	Dee Glen Smith Spectrum; Logan, Utah
Jan 14, 1988		at UC Irvine	L 81–87	9–5 (4–1)	Bren Events Center; Irvine, California
Jan 16, 1988		at UC Santa Barbara	W 73–72	10–5 (5–1)	The Thunderdome; Santa Barbara, California
Jan 19, 1988		No. 8 UNLV	L 83–87	10–6 (5–2)	Dee Glen Smith Spectrum; Logan, Utah
Jan 21, 1988		Cal State Fullerton	W 75–72	11–6 (6–2)	Dee Glen Smith Spectrum; Logan, Utah
Jan 30, 1988		San Jose State	W 114–85	12–6 (7–2)	Dee Glen Smith Spectrum; Logan, Utah
Feb 4, 1988		at New Mexico State	W 78–77	13–6 (8–2)	Pan American Center; Las Cruces, New Mexico
Feb 6, 1988		at Long Beach State	W 82–75	14–6 (9–2)	Gold Mine; Long Beach, California
Feb 10, 1988		UC Santa Barbara	W 85–62	15–6 (10–2)	Dee Glen Smith Spectrum; Logan, Utah
Feb 13, 1988		UC Irvine	W 102–83	16–6 (11–2)	Dee Glen Smith Spectrum; Logan, Utah
Feb 18, 1988		at No. 11 UNLV	L 74–94	16–7 (11–3)	Thomas & Mack Center; Paradise, Nevada
Feb 20, 1988		at Cal State Fullerton	L 77–80	16–8 (11–4)	Titan Gym; Fullerton, California
Feb 28, 1988		at San Jose State	L 95–96	16–9 (11–5)	San Jose Civic Auditorium; San Jose, California
Mar 3, 1988		Fresno State	W 82–69	17–9 (12–5)	Dee Glen Smith Spectrum; Logan, Utah
Mar 5, 1988		Pacific	W 102–73	18–9 (13–5)	Dee Glen Smith Spectrum; Logan, Utah
PCAA tournament
Mar 11, 1988*	(2)	vs. (7) San Jose State; Quarterfinals	W 80–72	19–9	The Forum; Inglewood, California
Mar 12, 1988*	(2)	vs. (3) UC Santa Barbara; Semifinals	W 73–66	20–9	The Forum; Inglewood, California
Mar 13, 1988*	(2)	vs. (5) UC Irvine; Championship game	W 86–79	21–9	The Forum; Inglewood, California
NCAA Tournament
Mar 18, 1988*	(10 MW)	vs. (7 MW) Vanderbilt; First Round	L 77–80	21–10	Bob Devaney Sports Center; Lincoln, Nebraska
*Non-conference game. ^{#}Rankings from AP Poll. (#) Tournament seedings in parentheses. MW=Midwest.
