= 1987–88 UC Irvine Anteaters men's basketball team =

American college basketball season

1987–88 UC Irvine Anteaters men's basketball

Freedom Bowl Classic Champions
- Conference: Pacific Coast Athletic Association
- Record: 16–14 (9–9 PCAA)
- Head coach: Bill Mulligan (8th season)
- Home arena: Bren Events Center

1987–88 Pacific Coast Athletic Association men's basketball standings
	Conf.				Overall
Team	W		L	PCT	W		L	PCT
No. 12 UNLV	15	–	3	.833	28	–	6	.824
UC Santa Barbara	13	–	5	.722	22	–	8	.733
Utah State †	13	–	5	.722	21	–	10	.677
Long Beach State	11	–	7	.611	17	–	12	.586
UC Irvine	9	–	9	.500	16	–	14	.533
New Mexico State	8	–	10	.444	16	–	16	.500
San Jose State	8	–	10	.444	14	–	15	.483
Cal State Fullerton	7	–	11	.389	12	–	17	.414
Fresno State	6	–	12	.333	9	–	19	.321
Pacific	0	–	18	.000	5	–	24	.172
† 1988 PCAA tournament winner

The 1987–88 UC Irvine Anteaters men's basketball team represented the University of California, Irvine during the 1987–88 NCAA Division I men's basketball season. The Anteaters were led by eighth year head coach Bill Mulligan and played at the Bren Events Center. They were members of the Pacific Coast Athletic Association. They finished the season 14–14, 9–9 in PCAA play and reached the PCAA Tournament finals for the first time.

== Previous season ==
The 1986–87 UC Irvine Anteaters men's basketball team finished the season with a record of 14–14 and 9–9 in PCAA play. They were eliminated in the first round of the PCAA Tournament by Cal State Fullerton.

== Roster ==
1987–88 UC Irvine Anteaters men's basketball team
Players
Coaches

Pos.	#	Name	Height	Weight	Year	Hometown
F		Justin Anderson	6 ft 5 in (1.96 m)	—
		John Boyle	—	—
G		Chris Cresswell	6 ft 3 in (1.91 m)	—
C		Mike Doktorczyk	6 ft 9 in (2.06 m)	—
F	30	Wayne Engelstad	6 ft 8 in (2.03 m)	245 lb (111 kg)	Sr	Rosemead, CA
F		Steve Florentine	6 ft 7 in (2.01 m)	—
G		Kevin Floyd	6 ft 5 in (1.96 m)	—
F		Jeff Herdman	6 ft 7 in (2.01 m)	—	Fr
G	25	Mike Hess	6 ft 1 in (1.85 m)	180 lb (82 kg)	Sr	Hilton Head, SC
G		Tyrone Howard	6 ft 4 in (1.93 m)	—
C		Ed Johansen	6 ft 9 in (2.06 m)	—
F		Mike Labat	—	—
G		Eddie Shannon	6 ft 0 in (1.83 m)	—
G	25	Peter Strauss	6 ft 5 in (1.96 m)	180 lb (82 kg)	Sr	Hilton Head, SC
F		Frank Woods	6 ft 5 in (1.96 m)	—

Head coach

Bill Mulligan

Assistant coach(es)

Legend

- (C) Team captain
- (S) Suspended
- (I) Ineligible
- (W) Walk-on
- Injured
- Current redshirt

Roster
Last update: September 19, 2017

== Schedule ==
Date time, TV	Rank^{#}	Opponent^{#}	Result	Record	Site (attendance) city, state
Non-Conference Season
November 27, 1987*		Army; Freedom Bowl Classic	W 90–68	1–0	Bren Events Center (1,469); Irvine, CA
November 28, 1987*		Manhattan; Freedom Bowl Classic	W 86–83	2–0	Bren Events Center (1,787); Irvine, CA
December 1, 1987*		at Pepperdine	L 89–91	2–1	Firestone Fieldhouse (2,077); Malibu, CA
December 4, 1987*		vs. Jacksonville; Hawkeye Classic	W 76–73	3–1	Carver-Hawkeye Arena (15,500); Iowa City, IA
December 5, 1987*		at Iowa; Hawkeye Classic	L 88–124	3–2	Carver-Hawkeye Arena (15,500); Iowa City, IA
December 11, 1987*		Pennsylvania	W 90–66	4–2	Bren Events Center (2,167); Irvine, CA
December 14, 1987*		New Orleans	W 93–91	5–2	Bren Events Center (1,940); Irvine, CA
December 17, 1987*		at UCLA	L 100–116	5–3	Pauley Pavilion (6,735); Los Angeles, CA
December 19, 1987*		at Bradley	L 119–139	5–4	Carver Arena (8,911); Peoria, IL
Conference Season
January 4, 1988		UC Santa Barbara	L 78–81	5–5 (0–1)	Bren Events Center (3,005); Irvine, CA
January 7, 1988		at Cal State Fullerton	W 81–73	6–5 (1–1)	Titan Gym (3,106); Fullerton, CA
January 9, 1988		at No. 13 UNLV	L 68–103	6–6 (1–2)	Thomas & Mack Center (15,506); Paradise, NV
January 14, 1988		Utah State	W 87–81	7–6 (2–2)	Bren Events Center (2,863); Irvine, CA
January 16, 1988		San Jose State	W 98–77	8–6 (3–2)	Bren Events Center (3,438); Irvine, CA
January 21, 1988		at Pacific	W 87–80	9–6 (4–2)	Alex G. Spanos Center (2,724); Stockton, CA
January 23, 1988		at Fresno State	L 67–71	9–7 (4–3)	Selland Arena (10,159); Fresno, CA
January 28, 1988		at Long Beach State	L 80–100	9–8 (4–4)	Bren Events Center (3,277); Irvine, CA
January 30, 1988		New Mexico State	W 79–62	10–8 (5–4)	Bren Events Center (1,507); Irvine, CA
February 4, 1988		No. 2 UNLV	L 77–99	10–9 (5–5)	Bren Events Center (5,000); Irvine, CA
February 6, 1988		Cal State Fullerton	L 77–99	11–9 (6–5)	Bren Events Center (2,547); Irvine, CA
February 13, 1988		at Utah State	L 83–102	11–10 (6–6)	Smith Spectrum (8,162); Logan, UT
February 15, 1988		at San Jose State	W 63–55	12–10 (7–6)	San Jose Civic Auditorium (1,574); San Jose, CA
February 18, 1988		Fresno State	W 82–78 ^{OT}	13–10 (8–6)	Bren Events Center (2,053); Irvine, CA
February 20, 1988		Pacific	W 85–81	14–10 (9–6)	Bren Events Center (3,153); Irvine, CA
February 25, 1988		at New Mexico State	L 59–75	14–11 (9–7)	Pan American Center (4,853); Las Cruces, NM
February 28, 1988		at Long Beach State	L 90–98	14–12 (9–8)	Gold Mine (2,537); Long Beach, CA
March 5, 1988		at UC Santa Barbara	L 77–83	14–13 (9–9)	UC Santa Barbara Events Center (6,000); Santa Barbara, CA
PCAA tournament
March 10, 1988		vs. Long Beach State; Quarterfinals	W 74–69	15–13	The Forum (2,000); Inglewood, CA
March 11, 1988		vs. No. 7 UNLV; Semifinals	W 74–70	16–13	The Forum (12,066); Inglewood, CA
March 13, 1988		vs. Utah State; Championship Game	L 79–86	16–14	The Forum (7,994); Inglewood, CA
*Non-conference game. ^{#}Rankings from AP Poll. (#) Tournament seedings in parentheses. All times are in Pacific Time.
