= 1987–88 Illinois State Redbirds men's basketball team =

American college basketball season

1987–88 Illinois State Redbirds men's basketball

NIT, First Round
- Conference: Missouri Valley Conference
- Record: 18–13 (9–5 MVC)
- Head coach: Bob Donewald (10th season)
- Home arena: Horton Field House

1987–88 Missouri Valley Conference men's basketball standings
	Conf.				Overall
Team	W		L	PCT	W		L	PCT
No. 11 Bradley †	12	–	2	.857	26	–	5	.839
Wichita State	11	–	3	.786	20	–	10	.667
Illinois State	9	–	5	.643	18	–	13	.581
Southern Illinois	6	–	8	.429	12	–	16	.429
Creighton	6	–	8	.429	16	–	16	.500
Drake	5	–	9	.357	14	–	14	.500
Tulsa	4	–	10	.286	8	–	20	.286
Indiana State	3	–	11	.214	7	–	21	.250
† 1988 MVC tournament winner Rankings from AP Poll

The 1987–88 Illinois State Redbirds men's basketball team represented Illinois State University during the 1987–88 NCAA Division I men's basketball season. The Redbirds, led by tenth year head coach Bob Donewald, played their home games at Horton Field House and were a member of the Missouri Valley Conference.

The Redbirds finished the season 18–13, 9–5 in conference play to finish in third place. They were the number three seed in the Missouri Valley Conference tournament. They were victorious in a quarterfinal game versus Drake University and in a semifinal game versus Wichita State University, but defeated beaten in the final game versus Bradley University.

The Redbirds received an at-large bid to the 1988 National Invitation Tournament. They lost to Cleveland State University in the first round.

== Roster ==
1987–88 Illinois State Redbirds men's basketball team
Players
Coaches

Pos.	#	Name	Height	Weight	Year	Hometown
G	23	Jeff Harris	6 ft 4 in (1.93 m)	—	Sr	Indianapolis, IN
C	45	Tony Holifield	6 ft 7 in (2.01 m)	—	Sr	Oak Park, MI
F	32	Cliff Peterson	6 ft 8 in (2.03 m)	—	Sr	Detroit, MI
G	34	Matt Taphorn	6 ft 5 in (1.96 m)	—	Sr	Pekin, IL
G	33	Todd Starks	6 ft 3 in (1.91 m)	—	Jr	Fort Wayne, IN
C	53	Jon Pemberton	6 ft 9 in (2.06 m)	—	RS So	Bloomingdale, IL
G	25	Randy Blair	6 ft 3 in (1.91 m)	—	So	Peoria, IL
C	52	Jarrod Coleman	6 ft 7 in (2.01 m)	—	So	North Chicago, IL
G	43	Rickey Jackson	6 ft 5 in (1.96 m)	—	So	Mount Morris, MI
F	44	Sonny Roberts	6 ft 7 in (2.01 m)	—	So	South Beloit, IL
G	24	Sam Skarich (redshirt)	6 ft 5 in (1.96 m)	—	So	St. Cloud, MN
C	54	Dan Cox (redshirt)	6 ft 9 in (2.06 m)	—	Fr	Normal, IL
F	42	Scott Fowler (redshirt)	6 ft 5 in (1.96 m)	—	Fr	Chicago, IL
F	35	Derek Stokes	6 ft 6 in (1.98 m)	—	Fr	Rockford, IL

Head coach

- Bob Donewald (Hanover)

Assistant coach(es)

- Anthony Jones
- Bill Zuiker
- Parker Laketa
- Mark Zwart

Legend

- (C) Team captain
- (S) Suspended
- (I) Ineligible
- (W) Walk-on
- Injured
- Current redshirt

== Schedule ==
Date time, TV	Rank^{#}	Opponent^{#}	Result	Record	High points	High rebounds	High assists	Site (attendance) city, state
Exhibition Season
November 4, 1987*; 7:00 pm		vs. Soviet Union National Team	L 62–71		17 – Peterson	–	–	Prairie Capital Convention Center (6,500); Springfield, IL
Regular Season
November 30, 1987*; 8:00 pm, ESPN		No. 2 Purdue	L 61–68	0–1	20 – Harris	11 – Peterson	–	Horton Field House (6,942); Normal, IL
December 2, 1987*; 7:30 pm		at Wisconsin–Green Bay	L 53–60	0–2	17 – Harris	–	–	Brown County Veterans Memorial Arena (2,902); Ashwaubenon, WI
December 5, 1987*; 7:30 pm, WGN		at DePaul	L 55–76	0–3	17 – Harris, Peterson	–	–	Rosemont Horizon (12,428); Rosemont, IL
December 12, 1987*; 2:30 pm		Saint Louis	W 61–58	1–3	–	–	–	Horton Field House (4,688); Normal, IL
December 15, 1987*; 7:30 pm		Chicago State	W 70–54	2–3	–	–	–	Horton Field House (4,552); Normal, IL
December 19, 1987*; 2:30 pm		Illinois–Chicago	W 79–61	3–3	–	–	–	Horton Field House (4,666); Normal, IL
December 22, 1987*		vs. Boston University; Gator Bowl Classic [Semifinal]	W 61–52	4–3	–	–	–	Jacksonville Veterans Memorial Coliseum (2,677); Jacksonville, FL
December 23, 1987*		vs. St. Bonaventure; Gator Bowl Classic [Final]	L 61–63	4–4	–	–	–	Jacksonville Veterans Memorial Coliseum (2,173); Jacksonville, FL
December 29, 1987*		vs. No. 14 Iowa; All-College Tournament [Semifinal]	W 89–88	5–4	25 – Taphorn	–	–	Myriad Convention Center (9,870); Oklahoma City, OK
December 30, 1987*		vs. No. 10 Oklahoma; All-College Tournament [Final]	L 56–107	5–5	11 – Holifield	–	–	Myriad Convention Center (14,005); Oklahoma City, OK
January 4, 1988; 8:05 pm, WEEK		at Bradley; I-74 Rivalry	W 85–74	6–5 (1–0)	–	–	–	Carver Arena (10,670); Peoria, IL
January 8, 1988; 7:00 pm, SportsVision		Tulsa	W 75–67	7–5 (2–0)	23 – Harris	–	–	Horton Field House (6,014); Normal, IL
January 11, 1988; 7:30 pm		Wichita State	L 54–66	7–6 (2–1)	19 – Harris	6 – Holifield	5 – Taphorn	Horton Field House (6,375); Normal, IL
January 20, 1988; 7:00 pm, SportsVision		Indiana State	W 72–64	8–6 (3–1)	–	–	–	Horton Field House (6,003); Normal, IL
January 23, 1988; 2:30 pm		Southern Illinois	W 102–98 ^{OT}	9–6 (4–1)	28 – Coleman	11 – Coleman	8 – Taphorn	Horton Field House (6,585); Normal, IL
January 25, 1988*; 7:30 pm, SportsVision		at Loyola–Chicago	L 80–86	9–7	21 – Holifield	–	–	International Amphitheatre (2,125); Chicago, IL
January 28, 1988; 7:00 pm, SportsVision		at Tulsa	L 31-51	9–8 (4–2)	–	–	–	Tulsa Convention Center (6,668); Tulsa, OK
January 30, 1988; 7:30 pm		at Wichita State	L 58–61	9–9 (4–3)	16 – Holifield	9 – Holifield	4 – Blair	Henry Levitt Arena (10,280); Wichita, KS
February 2, 1988*; 7:30 pm		Rider	W 81–64	10–9	–	–	–	Horton Field House (5,878); Normal, IL
February 8, 1988; 7:35 pm		at Creighton	W 74–61	11–9 (5–3)	19 – Taphorn	9 – Peterson	6 – Jackson	Omaha Civic Auditorium (5,077); Omaha, NE
February 13, 1988; 2:30 pm		Drake	W 82–74	12–9 (6–3)	–	–	–	Horton Field House (7,730); Normal, IL
February 15, 1988; 7:30 pm		Creighton	W 82–70	13–9 (7–3)	34 – Harris	5 – Harris	8 – Blair	Horton Field House (6,477); Normal, IL
February 17, 1988; 7:30 pm		at Indiana State	W 69–59	14–9 (8–3)	22 – Holifield	–	–	Hulman Center (4,222); Terre Haute, IN
February 20, 1988; 2:30 pm, WHOI		No. 17 Bradley; I-74 Rivalry	L 71–78	14–10 (8–4)	–	–	–	Horton Field House (7,745); Normal, IL
February 22, 1988; 7:35 pm		at Drake	W 72–69	15–10 (9–4)	–	–	–	Veterans Memorial Auditorium (4,430); Des Moines, IA
February 24, 1988*; 7:30 pm		Butler	W 87–62	16–10	27 – Taphorn	–	–	Horton Field House (5,830); Normal, IL
February 27, 1988; 7:35 pm		at Southern Illinois	L 67–68	16–11 (9–5)	24 – Holifield	14 – Peterson	8 – Jackson	SIU Arena (4,062); Carbondale, IL
Missouri Valley Conference {MVC} tournament
March 5, 1988*; 12:00 pm, SportsVision	(3)	vs. (6) Drake; Quarterfinal	W 72–60	17–11	18 – Holifield	8 – Coleman	6 – Jackson	Carver Arena (8,248); Peoria, IL
March 6, 1988*; 1:00 pm, SportsVision	(3)	vs. (2) Wichita State; Semifinal	W 59–51	18–11	17 – Harris	11 – Peterson	7 – Jackson	Carver Arena (9,225); Peoria, IL
March 8, 1988*; 8:30 pm, ESPN	(3)	at (1) No. 14 Bradley; Final	L 59–89	18–12	25 – Holifield	13 – Peterson	3 – Taphorn, Jackson	Carver Arena (10,570); Peoria, IL
National Invitation {NIT} tournament
March 18, 1988*		at Cleveland State; First Round	L 83–89 ^{OT}	18–13	18 – Taphorn	9 – Peterson	8 – Taphorn	Woodling Gymnasium (5,032); Cleveland, OH
*Non-conference game. ^{#}Rankings from AP Poll. (#) Tournament seedings in parentheses. All times are in Central Standard Time.
