= 1987–88 Southwest Missouri State Bears basketball team =

American college basketball season

1987–88 Southwest Missouri State Bears basketball

AMCU-8 Regular Season Champions

NCAA tournament
- Conference: Association of Mid-Continent Universities
- Record: 22–7 (12–2 AMCU-8)
- Head coach: Charlie Spoonhour (5th season)
- Home arena: Hammons Student Center

1987–88 AMCU-8 Conference men's basketball standings
	Conf.				Overall
Team	W		L	PCT	W		L	PCT
SW Missouri State	12	–	2	.857	22	–	7	.759
Cleveland State	11	–	3	.786	22	–	8	.733
Wisconsin–Green Bay	9	–	5	.643	18	–	9	.667
Eastern Illinois	7	–	7	.500	17	–	11	.607
Western Illinois	6	–	8	.429	15	–	12	.556
Northern Iowa	4	–	10	.286	10	–	18	.357
Illinois-Chicago	4	–	10	.286	8	–	20	.286
Valparaiso	3	–	11	.214	12	–	16	.429
Rankings from AP Poll

The 1987–88 Southwest Missouri State Bears basketball team represented Southwest Missouri State University in National Collegiate Athletic Association (NCAA) Division I men's basketball during the 1987–88 season. Playing in the Summit League (AMCU-8) and led by head coach Charlie Spoonhour, the Bears finished the season with a 22–7 overall record and won the AMCU-8 regular season title. Southwest Missouri State lost to UNLV in the opening round of the NCAA tournament.

== Roster ==
1987–88 Missouri State Bears men's basketball team
Players
Coaches

Pos.	#	Name	Height	Weight	Year	Hometown
F		Lee Campbell	6 ft 7 in (2.01 m)	—	So
C	42	Kelby Stuckey	6 ft 7 in (2.01 m)	—	Jr

Head coach

- Charlie Spoonhour (Ozarks)

Assistant coach(es)

Legend

- (C) Team captain
- (S) Suspended
- (I) Ineligible
- (W) Walk-on
- Injured
- Current redshirt

== Schedule and results ==
Date time, TV	Rank^{#}	Opponent^{#}	Result	Record	Site city, state
Exhibition
Nov 23, 1987*		Windsor	W 107–48		Hammons Student Center (5,790); Springfield, Missouri
Non-conference regular season
Nov 28, 1987*		San Francisco; Mazzio’s Pizza Classic	W 80–57	1–0	Hammons Student Center (7,782); Springfield, Missouri
Nov 29, 1987*		SMU; Mazzio’s Pizza Classic	L 58–69	1–1	Hammons Student Center (7,594); Springfield, Missouri
Dec 1, 1987*		Northern Michigan	W 82–69	2–1	Hammons Student Center (5,698); Springfield, Missouri
Dec 5, 1987*		at Arkansas	L 47–53	2–2	Barnhill Arena (8,610); Fayetteville, Arkansas
Dec 8, 1987*		at Kansas State	W 82–80 ^{4OT}	3–2	Ahearn Field House (10,800); Manhattan, Kansas
Dec 10, 1987*		Alabama State	W 75–71	4–2	Hammons Student Center (6,741); Springfield, Missouri
Dec 12, 1987*		at Southern Illinois	L 74–77	4–3	SIU Arena (4,152); Carbondale, Illinois
Dec 19, 1987*		Texas State	W 71–56	5–3	Hammons Student Center (8,395); Springfield, Missouri
Dec 21, 1987*		Arkansas State	W 65–57	6–3	Hammons Student Center (6,722); Springfield, Missouri
Dec 27, 1987*		vs. Southern Miss; First Tulsa Classic	L 82–89 ^{OT}	6–4	Tulsa Convention Center (7,725); Tulsa, Oklahoma
Dec 28, 1987*		vs. Grambling State; First Tulsa Classic	W 77–60	7–4	Tulsa Convention Center (7,955); Tulsa, Oklahoma
Jan 4, 1988*		Wichita State	W 58–56	8–4	Hammons Student Center (8,483); Springfield, Missouri
Jan 7, 1988*		at Saint Louis	W 64–49	9–4	Kiel Auditorium (7,402); St. Louis, Missouri
Jan 9, 1988*		Lincoln	W 82–54	10–4	Hammons Student Center (8,372); Springfield, Missouri
AMCU-8 Regular Season
Jan 16, 1988		Northern Iowa	W 75–67	11–4 (1–0)	Hammons Student Center (8,158); Springfield, Missouri
Jan 18, 1988		at Western Illinois	L 44–70	11–5 (1–1)	Western Hall (4,613); Macomb, Illinois
Jan 23, 1988		Cleveland State	W 89–84	12–5 (2–1)	Hammons Student Center (9,154); Springfield, Missouri
Jan 25, 1988		at Eastern Illinois	W 57–55	13–5 (3–1)	Lantz Arena (1,685); Charleston, Illinois
Jan 30, 1988		at Valparaiso	W 72–44	14–5 (4–1)	Athletics-Recreation Center (2,857); Valparaiso, Indiana
Feb 1, 1988		Illinois-Chicago	W 80–51	15–5 (5–1)	Hammons Student Center (8,052); Springfield, Missouri
Feb 6, 1988		at Wisconsin–Green Bay	W 77–65	16–5 (6–1)	Brown County Arena (5,536); Ashwaubenon, Wisconsin
Feb 8, 1988		at Northern Iowa	W 93–78	17–5 (7–1)	UNI-Dome (1,430); Cedar Falls, Iowa
Feb 13, 1988		Western Illinois	W 84–70	18–5 (8–1)	Hammons Student Center (8,922); Springfield, Missouri
Feb 15, 1988		at Cleveland State	L 53–75	18–6 (8–2)	Woodling Gym (3,262); Cleveland, Ohio
Feb 20, 1988		Eastern Illinois	W 76–56	19–6 (9–2)	Hammons Student Center (9,129); Springfield, Missouri
Feb 22, 1988		Valparaiso	W 80–65	20–6 (10–2)	Hammons Student Center (7,028); Springfield, Missouri
Feb 25, 1988		at Illinois-Chicago	W 88–66	21–6 (11–2)	UIC Pavilion (1,824); Chicago, Illinois
Mar 5, 1988		Wisconsin–Green Bay	W 70–52	22–6 (12–2)	Hammons Student Center (9,170); Springfield, Missouri
NCAA Tournament
Mar 18, 1988*	(13 W)	vs. (4 W) No. 12 UNLV; First Round	L 50–54	22–7	Pauley Pavilion (11,175); Los Angeles, California
*Non-conference game. ^{#}Rankings from AP Poll. (#) Tournament seedings in parentheses. W=West. All times are in Central Time.
