= 1988 Southwest Conference men's basketball tournament =

- Classification: Division I
- Season: 1987–88
- Teams: 8
- Site: Reunion Arena; Dallas, Texas
- Champions: SMU (1st title)
- Winning coach: Dave Bliss (1st title)
- MVP: Micheal Williams (Baylor)

1987–88 Southwest Conference men's basketball standings
	Conf.				Overall
Team	W		L	PCT	W		L	PCT
SMU †	12	–	4	.750	28	–	7	.800
Arkansas	11	–	5	.688	21	–	9	.700
Baylor	11	–	5	.688	23	–	11	.676
Houston	10	–	6	.625	18	–	13	.581
Texas	10	–	6	.625	16	–	13	.552
Texas A&M	8	–	8	.500	16	–	15	.516
Texas Tech	4	–	12	.250	9	–	19	.321
TCU	3	–	13	.188	9	–	19	.321
Rice	3	–	13	.188	6	–	21	.222
† 1988 SWC tournament winner Rankings from AP Poll

The 1988 Southwest Conference men's basketball tournament was held March 11–13, 1988, at Reunion Arena in Dallas, Texas.

Number 1 seed SMU defeated 2 seed Baylor 75-64 to win their 1st championship and receive the conference's automatic bid to the 1988 NCAA tournament.

== Format and seeding ==
The tournament consisted of the top 8 teams playing in a single-elimination tournament.

Place	Seed	Team	Conference			Overall		
Place	Seed	Team	W	L	%	W	L	%
1	1	SMU	12	4	.750	28	7	.800
2	2	Baylor	11	5	.688	23	11	.676
2	3	Arkansas	11	5	.688	21	9	.700
4	4	Texas	10	6	.625	16	13	.552
4	5	Houston	10	6	.625	18	13	.581
6	6	Texas A&M	8	8	.500	16	15	.516
7	7	Texas Tech	4	12	.250	9	19	.321
8	8	TCU	3	13	.188	9	19	.321
8	-	Rice	3	13	.188	6	21	.222

== Tournament ==
Quarterfinals; Friday, March 11
1	SMU	86
8	TCU	84
4	Texas	57
5	Houston	72
3	Arkansas	76
6	Texas A&M	64
2	Baylor	54
7	Texas Tech	53

Semifinals; Saturday, March 12
1	SMU	98
5	Houston	76
3	Arkansas	73
2	Baylor	74

Finals; Sunday, March 13
1	SMU	75
2	Baylor	64
