= 1987–88 Bradley Braves men's basketball team =

American college basketball season

1987–88 Bradley Braves men's basketball

MVC tournament champions MVC Regular Season Champions

NCAA tournament, First Round
- Conference: Missouri Valley Conference

Ranking
- Coaches: No. 12
- AP: No. 11
- Record: 26–5 (12–2 MVC)
- Head coach: Stan Albeck (2nd season)
- Assistant coaches: Morris McHone; Marty Gillespie
- Home arena: Carver Arena

1987–88 Missouri Valley Conference men's basketball standings
| | Conf. | | | | Overall |
| Team | W | | L | PCT | W | | L | PCT |
|---|---|---|---|---|---|---|---|---|
| No. 11 Bradley † | 12 | – | 2 | .857 | 26 | – | 5 | .839 |
| Wichita State | 11 | – | 3 | .786 | 20 | – | 10 | .667 |
| Illinois State | 9 | – | 5 | .643 | 18 | – | 13 | .581 |
| Southern Illinois | 6 | – | 8 | .429 | 12 | – | 16 | .429 |
| Creighton | 6 | – | 8 | .429 | 16 | – | 16 | .500 |
| Drake | 5 | – | 9 | .357 | 14 | – | 14 | .500 |
| Tulsa | 4 | – | 10 | .286 | 8 | – | 20 | .286 |
| Indiana State | 3 | – | 11 | .214 | 7 | – | 21 | .250 |
† 1988 MVC tournament winner Rankings from AP Poll

The 1987–88 Bradley Braves men's basketball team represented Bradley University during the 1987–88 NCAA Division I men's basketball season. The Braves were members of the Missouri Valley Conference (MVC) and played their home games at Carver Arena. They won the MVC regular season championship as well as the conference tournament. Bradley finished the season 26–5, and qualified for the NCAA tournament. They were led by second-year head coach, and MVC Coach of the Year, Stan Albeck, and Consensus First-team All-American Hersey Hawkins, who led the nation in scoring by averaging 36.3 points per game. Hawkins collected multiple national player of the year awards, and remains the career scoring leader in Missouri Valley Conference history.

== Roster ==
1987–88 Bradley Braves men's basketball team
Players
Coaches

| Pos. | # | Name | Height | Weight | Year | Previous school | Hometown |
|---|---|---|---|---|---|---|---|
| G | 12 | Anthony Manuel | 5 ft 11 in (1.8 m) | 185 lb (84 kg) | Jr | Crane | Chicago, IL |
| G | 14 | Scott Beccue | 5 ft 10 in (1.78 m) | 157 lb (71 kg) | Jr | Pekin | Pekin, IL |
| F | 21 | Jerry Thomas | 6 ft 6 in (1.98 m) | 210 lb (95 kg) | Sr | Collins | Chicago, IL |
| G/F | 23 | Paul Wilson | 6 ft 6 in (1.98 m) | 180 lb (82 kg) | Jr | Lorain Catholic | Lorain, OH |
| F/C | 24 | Donald Powell | 6 ft 8 in (2.03 m) | 215 lb (98 kg) | Sr | Nowata | Nowata, OK |
| G/F | 25 | Jay Schell | 6 ft 6 in (1.98 m) | 180 lb (82 kg) | Fr | Stevens Point | Stevens Point, WI |
| F | 32 | Greg Jones | 6 ft 5 in (1.96 m) | 218 lb (99 kg) | Sr | Robeson | Chicago, IL |
| G | 33 | Hersey Hawkins | 6 ft 3 in (1.91 m) | 185 lb (84 kg) | Sr | Westinghouse | Chicago, IL |
| F | 34 | Steve Bayless | 6 ft 6 in (1.98 m) | 212 lb (96 kg) | Fr | Chillicothe | Chillicothe, OH |
| G/F | 40 | Trevor Trimpe | 6 ft 7 in (2.01 m) | 215 lb (98 kg) | Sr | Havana | Havana, IL |
| G | 41 | Mike Cash | 6 ft 3 in (1.91 m) | 185 lb (84 kg) | So | Lowell | Lowell, IN |
| G | 44 | Len Bertolini | 6 ft 3 in (1.91 m) | 192 lb (87 kg) | Sr | St. Patrick's | Chicago, IL |
| F | 52 | Bruce Mordini | 6 ft 7 in (2.01 m) | 215 lb (98 kg) | Sr | Highland Park | Highland Park, IL |
| C | 53 | Luke Jackson | 6 ft 8 in (2.03 m) | 225 lb (102 kg) | So | Calvary Academy | Springfield, IL |

Head coach

- Stan Albeck

Assistant coach(es)

- Morris McHone
- Marty Gillespie

Legend

- (C) Team captain
- (S) Suspended
- (I) Ineligible
- (W) Walk-on
- Injured
- Current redshirt

Roster

== Schedule ==
| Date time, TV | Rank^{#} | Opponent^{#} | Result | Record | High points | High rebounds | High assists | Site (attendance) city, state |
Regular season
| Dec 4, 1987* | | New Orleans | W 111–94 | 1–0 | 42 – Hawkins | – | – | Carver Arena (9,587); Peoria, IL |
| Dec 9, 1987* | | Colorado | W 94–78 | 2–0 | 44 – Hawkins | – | – | Carver Arena (9,091); Peoria, IL |
| Dec 13, 1987* | | vs. Northern Illinois | W 84–78 | 3–0 | 39 – Hawkins | – | – | Rockford MetroCentre (2,451); Rockford, IL |
| Dec 17, 1987* | | at No. 19 Memphis State | L 108–113 ^{OT} | 3–1 | 38 – Hawkins | – | – | Mid-South Coliseum (11,200); Memphis, TN |
| Dec 19, 1987* | | UC Irvine | W 139–119 | 4–1 | 51 – Hawkins | – | 21 – Manuel | Carver Arena (8,911); Peoria, IL |
| Dec 22, 1987* | | Evansville | W 93–80 | 5–1 | 32 – Hawkins | – | – | Carver Arena (9,879); Peoria, IL |
| Dec 30, 1987* | | at Dayton | W 97–80 | 6–1 | 36 – Hawkins | – | – | University of Dayton Arena (12,674); Dayton, OH |
| Jan 2, 1988* | | at Loyola (IL) | W 99–82 | 7–1 | 37 – Manuel | – | – | Alumni Gym (4,779); Chicago, IL |
| Jan 4, 1988; 8:05 pm, WEEK | | Illinois State; I-74 Rivalry | L 74–85 | 7–2 (0–1) | – | – | – | Carver Arena (10,670); Peoria, IL |
| Jan 6, 1988* | | at UNC Charlotte | W 98–82 | 8–2 | 49 – Hawkins | – | – | Charlotte Coliseum (10,012); Charlotte, NC |
| Jan 9, 1988 | | Wichita State | W 88–70 | 9–2 (1–1) | 31 – Hawkins | – | – | Carver Arena (10,470); Peoria, IL |
| Jan 16, 1988 | | at Indiana State | W 79–68 | 10–2 (2–1) | – | – | – | Hulman Center (7,077); Terre Haute, IN |
| Jan 21, 1988 | | Southern Illinois | W 99–93 | 11–2 (3–1) | 42 – Hawkins | – | – | Carver Arena (10,480); Peoria, IL |
| Jan 28, 1988* | | West Virginia | W 96–65 | 12–2 | 34 – Hawkins | – | 18 – Manuel | Carver Arena (10,045); Peoria, IL |
| Jan 30, 1988 | | at Tulsa | W 65–62 | 13–2 (4–1) | – | – | – | Tulsa Convention Center (7,981); Tulsa, OK |
| Feb 2, 1988 | No. 18 | at Wichita State | L 92–116 | 13–3 (4–2) | 37 – Hawkins | – | – | Levitt Arena (10,525); Wichita, KS |
| Feb 6, 1988 | No. 18 | at Drake | W 85–67 | 14–3 (5–2) | 32 – Hawkins | – | – | Veterans Memorial Auditorium (10,689); Des Moines, IA |
| Feb 8, 1988* | No. 18 | Saint Louis | W 83–67 | 15–3 | – | – | – | Carver Arena (9,710); Peoria, IL |
| Feb 10, 1988* | No. 15 | at DePaul | L 80–86 | 15–4 | – | – | – | Rosemont Horizon (15,610); Rosemont, IL |
| Feb 13, 1988 | No. 15 | Creighton | W 98–68 | 16–4 (6–2) | – | – | – | Carver Arena (10,490); Peoria, IL |
| Feb 15, 1988 | No. 15 | Drake | W 85–83 | 17–4 (7–2) | 38 – Hawkins | – | 16 – Manuel | Carver Arena (10,438); Peoria, IL |
| Feb 18, 1988 | No. 17 | at Creighton | W 83–67 | 18–4 (8–2) | 35 – Hawkins | – | – | Omaha Civic Auditorium (5,728); Omaha, NE |
| Feb 20, 1988; 2:30 pm, WHOI | No. 17 | at Illinois State; I-74 Rivalry | W 78–71 ^{OT} | 19–4 (9–2) | 34 – Hawkins | – | – | Horton Field House (7,745); Normal, IL |
| Feb 22, 1988* | No. 17 | at Detroit Mercy | W 122–107 | 20–4 | 63 – Hawkins | – | – | Calihan Hall (4,021); Detroit, MI |
| Feb 25, 1988 | No. 14 | Tulsa | W 67–62 | 21–4 (10–2) | 43 – Hawkins | – | – | Carver Arena (10,470); Peoria, IL |
| Feb 27, 1988 | No. 14 | Indiana State | W 95–74 | 22–4 (11–2) | 36 – Hawkins | – | 18 – Manuel | Carver Arena (10,490); Peoria, IL |
| Mar 1, 1988 | No. 14 | at Southern Illinois | W 113–102 | 23–4 (12–2) | 39 – Hawkins | – | – | SIU Arena (8,716); Carbondale, IL |
MVC tournament
| Mar 5, 1988* | No. 14 | Indiana State; MVC Tournament Quarterfinal | W 93–74 | 24–4 | 41 – Hawkins | – | – | Carver Arena (9,737); Peoria, IL |
| Mar 6, 1988* | No. 14 | Creighton; MVC Tournament Semifinal | W 101–77 | 25–4 | 38 – Hawkins | – | – | Carver Arena (9,225); Peoria, IL |
| Mar 7, 1988* | No. 14 | Illinois State; MVC tournament championship | W 89–59 | 26–4 | – | – | – | Carver Arena (10,570); Peoria, IL |
NCAA tournament
| Mar 17, 1988* | (9 SE) No. 11 | vs. (8 SE) Auburn; NCAA tournament first round | L 86–90 | 26–5 | 44 – Hawkins | – | – | Omni Coliseum; Atlanta, GA |
*Non-conference game. ^{#}Rankings from AP Poll. (#) Tournament seedings in parentheses. SE=Southeast. All times are in Central Time.

== Rankings ==
Ranking movements Legend: ██ Increase in ranking ██ Decrease in ranking
| | Week | | | | | | | | | | | | | | | | |
| Poll | Pre | 1 | 2 | 3 | 4 | 5 | 6 | 7 | 8 | 9 | 10 | 11 | 12 | 13 | 14 | 15 | Final |
|---|---|---|---|---|---|---|---|---|---|---|---|---|---|---|---|---|---|
| AP | | | | | | | | | | | 18 | 15 | 17 | 14 | 14 | 12 | 11 |
| Coaches | Not released | | | | | | | | | | 16 | 20 | 18 | 14 | 17 | 12 | 12 |

== Awards and honors ==
- Hersey Hawkins – Adolph Rupp Trophy, AP Player of the Year, Oscar Robertson Trophy, Sporting News Player of the Year, UPI Player of the Year, Consensus First-team All-American, MVC Player of the Year
- Stan Albeck – MVC Coach of the Year

== Team players in the 1988 NBA draft ==
| Round | Pick | Player | NBA club |
|---|---|---|---|
| 1 | 6 | Hersey Hawkins | Los Angeles Clippers |
