= 1987–88 Wichita State Shockers men's basketball team =

American college basketball season

1987–88 Wichita State Shockers men's basketball

NCAA tournament
- Conference: Missouri Valley Conference
- Record: 20–10 (11–3 MVC)
- Head coach: Eddie Fogler (2nd season)
- Home arena: Levitt Arena (10,506)

1987–88 Missouri Valley Conference men's basketball standings
	Conf.				Overall
Team	W		L	PCT	W		L	PCT
No. 11 Bradley †	12	–	2	.857	26	–	5	.839
Wichita State	11	–	3	.786	20	–	10	.667
Illinois State	9	–	5	.643	18	–	13	.581
Southern Illinois	6	–	8	.429	12	–	16	.429
Creighton	6	–	8	.429	16	–	16	.500
Drake	5	–	9	.357	14	–	14	.500
Tulsa	4	–	10	.286	8	–	20	.286
Indiana State	3	–	11	.214	7	–	21	.250
† 1988 MVC tournament winner Rankings from AP Poll

The 1987–88 Wichita State Shockers men's basketball team represented Wichita State University in the 1987–88 NCAA Division I men's basketball season. They played their home games at the University of Wichita Field House. They were in their 43rd season as a member of the Missouri Valley Conference and 82nd season overall. They were led by head coach Eddie Fogler in his 2nd season at the school. They finished the season 20–10, 11–3 in Missouri Valley play to finish in second place. They lost in the semifinals of the MVC tournament, but received an at-large bid to the 1988 NCAA tournament. As the No. 12 seed in the Midwest region, the Shockers lost in the opening round to DePaul, 83–62.

== Roster ==
1987–88 Wichita State Shockers men's basketball team
Players	Coaches
Pos. / # / Name / Height / Weight / Year / Hometown; C / 45 / Sasha Radunovich / 6 ft 10 in (2.08 m) / 230 lb (104 kg) / Jr	Head coach: Eddie Fogler; Assistant coach(es) Legend: (C) Team captain; (S) Suspended; (I) Ineligible; (W) Walk-on; Injured; Current redshirt

== Schedule and results ==
Date time, TV	Rank^{#}	Opponent^{#}	Result	Record	Site (attendance) city, state
Regular season
Nov 28, 1987*		Cal State Northridge	W 78–53	1–0	Levitt Arena; Wichita, Kansas
Dec 3, 1987*		No. 11 Purdue	L 78–80	1–1	Levitt Arena; Wichita, Kansas
Dec 5, 1987*		at George Mason	L 93–94	1–2	EagleBank Arena; Fairfax, Virginia
Dec 7, 1987*		at Hartford	L 62–69	1–3	Hartford Civic Center; Hartford, Connecticut
Dec 12, 1987*		Grambling State	W 93–80	2–3	Levitt Arena; Wichita, Kansas
Dec 17, 1987*		Austin Peay	W 72–66	3–3	Levitt Arena; Wichita, Kansas
Dec 19, 1987*		at Oregon State	W 60–57	4–3	Gill Coliseum; Corvallis, Oregon
Dec 28, 1987*		Illinois-Chicago	W 79–58	5–3	Levitt Arena; Wichita, Kansas
Jan 2, 1988*		Minnesota	W 78–68	6–3	Levitt Arena; Wichita, Kansas
Jan 4, 1988*		at SW Missouri State	L 56–58	6–4	Hammons Student Center; Springfield, Missouri
Jan 6, 1988*		Oral Roberts	W 94–72	7–4	Levitt Arena; Wichita, Kansas
Jan 9, 1988		at Bradley	L 70–88	7–5 (0–1)	Carver Arena; Peoria, Illinois
Jan 11, 1988; 7:30 p.m.		at Illinois State	W 66–54	8–5 (1–1)	Horton Field House (6,375); Normal, Illinois
Jan 13, 1988		Drake	W 80–69	9–5 (2–1)	Levitt Arena; Wichita, Kansas
Jan 16, 1988		Creighton	W 92–73	10–5 (3–1)	Levitt Arena; Wichita, Kansas
Jan 19, 1988*		at Kansas State	L 47–58	10–6	Ahearn Field House; Manhattan, Kansas
Jan 23, 1988		at Drake	L 58–61	10–7 (3–2)	Veterans Memorial Auditorium; Des Moines, Iowa
Jan 30, 1988; 7:30 p.m.		Illinois State	W 61–58	11–7 (4–2)	Levitt Arena (10,280); Wichita, Kansas
Feb 1, 1988		Bradley	W 116–92	12–7 (5–2)	Levitt Arena; Wichita, Kansas
Feb 6, 1988		Indiana State	W 102–70	13–7 (6–2)	Levitt Arena; Wichita, Kansas
Feb 8, 1988		Southern Illinois	W 89–87	14–7 (7–2)	Levitt Arena; Wichita, Kansas
Feb 11, 1988		at Indiana State	L 62–63	14–8 (7–3)	Hulman Center; Terre Haute, Indiana
Feb 13, 1988		at Southern Illinois	W 83–81	15–8 (8–3)	SIU Arena; Carbondale, Illinois
Feb 18, 1988		Tulsa	W 65–59	16–8 (9–3)	Levitt Arena; Wichita, Kansas
Feb 20, 1988		at Creighton	W 63–49	17–8 (10–3)	Omaha Civic Auditorium; Omaha, Nebraska
Feb 27, 1988		at Tulsa	W 79–77	18–8 (11–3)	Tulsa Convention Center; Tulsa, Oklahoma
Feb 29, 1988*		Radford	W 98–75	19–8	Levitt Arena; Wichita, Kansas
MVC tournament
Mar 5, 1988*	(2)	vs. (7) Tulsa; Quarterfinals	W 74–66	20–8	Carver Arena; Peoria, Illinois
Mar 6, 1988*	(2)	vs. (3) Illinois State; Semifinals	L 51–59	20–9	Carver Arena (9,225); Peoria, Illinois
NCAA tournament
Mar 17, 1988*	(12 MW)	vs. (5 MW) DePaul; First round	L 62–83	20–10	Joyce Center; South Bend, Indiana
*Non-conference game. ^{#}Rankings from AP poll. (#) Tournament seedings in parentheses. MW=Midwest. All times are in Central Time.
