= Stan Albeck =

American basketball player and coach (1931–2021)

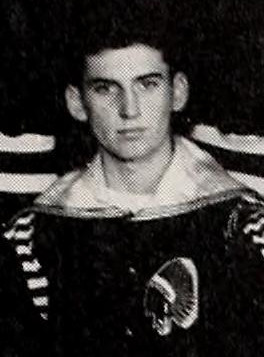
- Albeck in 1952

Personal information
- Born: May 17, 1931 Chenoa, Illinois, U.S.
- Died: March 25, 2021 (aged 89) San Antonio, Texas, U.S.
- Listed height: 5 ft 11 in (1.80 m)

Career information
- High school: Chenoa (Chenoa, Illinois)
- College: Bradley (1950–1952, 1954–1955)
- NBA draft: 1955: undrafted
- Position: Guard
- Coaching career: 1956–2002

Career history

Coaching
- 1956–1957: Adrian
- 1957–1968: Northern Michigan
- 1968–1970: Denver
- 1970–1973: Denver Rockets (assistant)
- 1970–1971: Denver Rockets (interim HC)
- 1972–1974: San Diego Conquistadors (assistant)
- 1974–1976: Kentucky Colonels (assistant)
- 1976–1979: Los Angeles Lakers (assistant)
- 1979–1980: Cleveland Cavaliers
- 1980–1983: San Antonio Spurs
- 1983–1985: New Jersey Nets
- 1985–1986: Chicago Bulls
- 1986–1991: Bradley
- 1995–1996: New Jersey Nets (assistant)
- 1997–2000: Atlanta Hawks (assistant)
- 2000–2002: Toronto Raptors (assistant)

Career highlights
- As head coach: MVC tournament champion (1988); MVC regular season champion (1988); MVC Coach of the Year (1988)

Charles Stanley Albeck (May 17, 1931 – March 25, 2021) was an American professional basketball coach. Albeck coached for several teams in the American Basketball Association (ABA) and National Basketball Association (NBA), including the Denver Rockets, the San Diego Conquistadors (often subbing for an absent Wilt Chamberlain), the Cleveland Cavaliers, the San Antonio Spurs, the New Jersey Nets, and the Chicago Bulls.

== Early life ==
Albeck was born in Chenoa, Illinois, on May 17, 1931, to parents Chad and Ruby Albeck. He attended Chenoa High School in his hometown. Albeck played college basketball for the Bradley Braves from 1950 to 1952 and during the 1954–55 season after a two-year stint in the United States Army. He obtained a bachelor's degree at Bradley University in 1955 and his master's at Michigan State University in 1957.

== Coaching career ==
Albeck began his coaching at Adrian College in Adrian, Michigan. His next head coaching job was at Northern Michigan University. Albeck was head coach at the University of Denver from 1968 to 1970. He was the head coach of the Denver Rockets during most of the 1970–1971 season. The Rockets had begun the season under head coach Joe Belmont, but Belmont was fired after the team lost 10 of its first 13 games. Albeck replaced Belmont as the Rockets' head coach. The Rockets went 27–44 under Albeck to finish the season with a record of 30 wins and 54 losses. They tied the Texas Chaparrals for fourth place in the Western Division (28 games behind the Indiana Pacers) and on April 1, 1971, lost a one-game playoff to the Chaparrals, 115–109, to determine who would advance into the ABA Western Division semifinals. During the season Denver's average home attendance dropped to 4,139 fans per game from 6,281 the year before. One week after the playoff loss, on April 8, 1971, Albeck was replaced by Alex Hannum as Denver's head coach. Hannum resigned as coach of the San Diego Rockets to become the Rockets' head coach, general manager and president. Albeck then became player personnel director for the Rockets. During the 1972–1973 season Albeck was an assistant coach for the San Diego Conquistadors under head coach K.C. Jones. Albeck also served as director of player personnel for the Conquistadors. During most of the 1973–74 season, he served under 'Qs' head coach Wilt Chamberlain. Chamberlain missed a few games, during which Albeck filled in as the Conquistadors' head coach, winning all of them.

Albeck was an assistant coach for the Kentucky Colonels during the 1974–75 season in which the team won the 1975 ABA Championship. He returned as an assistant coach with the Colonels during their final season in 1975–1976. Albeck served as assistant coach of the Los Angeles Lakers from 1976 until 1979.

He went on to become head coach of the Cleveland Cavaliers from 1979 to 1980. He was the San Antonio Spurs' head coach for three seasons from 1980 to 1983. During his tenure, he won NBA Coach of the Month in March 1983. He elected to leave the Spurs after the 1982–83 season ended, a move that attracted a few weeks of legal wrangling when the Spurs found a way to obtain a restraining order because they claimed Albeck had two years left on an "oral contract". Eventually, Albeck was allowed to coach the Nets after the Spurs received $300,000, the 22nd selection in the second round of the 1983 NBA draft and the rights to Fred Roberts (the 27th selection in the 1982 draft). Albeck coached the next two seasons and was perceived to have brought stability to a team that had not won a playoff series since joining the NBA. They beat the defending NBA champion Philadelphia 76ers in the First Round that went the full five games but lost to the Milwaukee Bucks in six games. As it turned out, it would be the only time the Nets won a postseason series for nearly two decades. The Nets reached the postseason in Albeck's second and ultimately last season but lost in a sweep to the Pistons. In the summer of 1985, Albeck was lured to coach the Chicago Bulls with a lucrative contract that reportedly would pay him $900,000 over three years while the Bulls also would agree to pay New Jersey to buyout the last year of Albeck's contract with New Jersey and the remaining money that the Nets still owed the Spurs.

Albeck became the eighth fulltime coach of the Bulls since 1978. He and general manager Jerry Krause immediately butted heads over issues including his refusal to put Phil Jackson on his coaching staff, not benching Quintin Dailey for conduct issues, and most of all, not following the minutes restrictions set once Michael Jordan returned from injury. His exit from Chicago raised eyebrows around the NBA as his replacement, Doug Collins, had been hired by general manager Jerry Krause just 2 months beforehand as a scout. The hire of Collins was kept a secret from Albeck, who was "stunned" by the move and felt that there was "a lack of respect, dignity and sensitivity". At the time of his dismissal, he had the fourth-best record among active NBA coaches. His all-time coaching percentages was .535 in his 7 years as a head coach in the NBA.

Albeck went on to serve as head coach for Bradley University, his alma mater, from 1986 through 1991. During his tenure, the team finished the 1988 regular season in first place. They were also champions of the Missouri Valley Conference tournament and advanced to the NCAA tournament that same year. Albeck was a member of the Sigma Chi fraternity, as well as a Significant Sig and a member of their Significant Sig Hall of Fame.

After serving as an assistant coach for the Atlanta Hawks, Albeck was an assistant coach for the Toronto Raptors. He suffered a debilitating stroke in December 2001, approximately half an hour before a home game against the Miami Heat. This left him partially paralyzed and forced him to retire. He remained in rehabilitation until his death. He often attended games at AT&T Center with his son.

== Personal life ==
Albeck married Phyllis L. Mann in 1952. Together, they had five children. They remained married until her death in 2017.

Shortly after being placed in hospice care, Albeck died March 25, 2021, in San Antonio, Texas, at the age of 89. He had suffered a stroke two weeks prior to his death.

== Head coaching record ==
Legend
| Regular season | G | Games coached | W | Games won | L | Games lost | W–L % | Win–loss % |
| Playoffs | PG | Playoff games | PW | Playoff wins | PL | Playoff losses | PW–L % | Playoff win–loss % |

=== ABA/NBA ===
| Team | Year | G | W | L | W–L% | Finish | PG | PW | PL | PW–L% | Result |
|---|---|---|---|---|---|---|---|---|---|---|---|
| Denver (ABA) | 1970–71 | 71 | 27 | 44 | .380 | 5th in Western | — | — | — | — | Missed playoffs |
| Cleveland | 1979–80 | 82 | 37 | 45 | .451 | 4th in Central | — | — | — | — | Missed playoffs |
| San Antonio | 1980–81 | 82 | 52 | 30 | .634 | 1st in Midwest | 7 | 3 | 4 | .429 | Lost in Conf. semifinals |
| San Antonio | 1981–82 | 82 | 48 | 34 | .585 | 1st in Midwest | 9 | 4 | 5 | 444 | Lost in Conf. Finals |
| San Antonio | 1982–83 | 82 | 53 | 29 | .646 | 1st in Midwest | 11 | 6 | 5 | .545 | Lost in Conf. Finals |
| New Jersey | 1983–84 | 82 | 45 | 37 | .549 | 4th in Atlantic | 11 | 5 | 6 | .455 | Lost in Conf. semifinals |
| New Jersey | 1984–85 | 82 | 42 | 40 | .512 | 3rd in Atlantic | 3 | 0 | 3 | .000 | Lost in first round |
| Chicago | 1985–86 | 82 | 30 | 52 | .366 | 4th in Central | 3 | 0 | 3 | .000 | Lost in first round |
| Career (NBA) | | 574 | 307 | 267 | .535 | | 44 | 18 | 26 | .409 | |
| Career (overall) | | 645 | 334 | 311 | .518 | | 44 | 18 | 26 | .409 | |

=== College ===
Record table
| Season | Team | Overall | Conference | Standing | Postseason |
|---|---|---|---|---|---|
Adrian Bulldogs (Michigan Intercollegiate Athletic Association) (1956–1957)
| 1956–57 | Adrian | 16–5 | | 3rd | |
| Adrian: | | 16–5 (.762) | | | |
Northern Michigan Wildcats () (1957–1968)
| 1957–58 | Northern Michigan | 15–3 | | | NAIA first round |
| 1958–59 | Northern Michigan | 16–8 | | | NAIA first round |
| 1959–60 | Northern Michigan | 13–5 | | | |
| 1960–61 | Northern Michigan | 24–3 | | | NAIA Final Four |
| 1961–62 | Northern Michigan | 14–9 | | | |
| 1962–63 | Northern Michigan | 19–8 | | | NAIA Elite Eight |
| 1963–64 | Northern Michigan | 12–11 | | | |
| 1964–65 | Northern Michigan | 19–6 | | | NAIA first round |
| 1965–66 | Northern Michigan | 16–6 | | | |
| 1966–67 | Northern Michigan | 14–10 | | | |
| 1967–68 | Northern Michigan | 16–8 | | | |
| Northern Michigan: | | 178–77 (.698) | | | |
Denver Pioneers (NCAA Division I independent) (1968–1970)
| 1968–69 | Denver | 2–24 | | | |
| 1969–70 | Denver | 13–11 | | | |
| Denver: | | 15–35 (.300) | | | |
Bradley Braves (Missouri Valley Conference) (1986–1991)
| 1986–87 | Bradley | 17–12 | 10–4 | 2nd | |
| 1987–88 | Bradley | 26–5 | 12–2 | 1st | NCAA First Round |
| 1988–89 | Bradley | 13–14 | 7–7 | 4th | |
| 1989–90 | Bradley | 11–20 | 6–8 | 5th | |
| 1990–91 | Bradley | 8–20 | 6–10 | 7th | |
| Bradley: | | 75–71 (.514) | | | |
| Total: | | 284–188 (.602) | | | |
National champion Postseason invitational champion Conference regular season champion Conference regular season and conference tournament champion Division regular season champion Division regular season and conference tournament champion Conference tournament champion
