= 1988 Missouri Valley Conference men's basketball tournament =

- Classification: Division I
- Season: 1987–88
- Teams: 8
- Site: Carver Arena; Peoria, Illinois
- Champions: Bradley (2nd title)
- Winning coach: Stan Albeck (1st title)
- MVP: Hersey Hawkins (Bradley)

1987–88 Missouri Valley Conference men's basketball standings
	Conf.				Overall
Team	W		L	PCT	W		L	PCT
No. 11 Bradley †	12	–	2	.857	26	–	5	.839
Wichita State	11	–	3	.786	20	–	10	.667
Illinois State	9	–	5	.643	18	–	13	.581
Southern Illinois	6	–	8	.429	12	–	16	.429
Creighton	6	–	8	.429	16	–	16	.500
Drake	5	–	9	.357	14	–	14	.500
Tulsa	4	–	10	.286	8	–	20	.286
Indiana State	3	–	11	.214	7	–	21	.250
† 1988 MVC tournament winner Rankings from AP Poll

The 1988 Missouri Valley Conference men's basketball tournament was played after the conclusion of the 1987–1988 regular season at Carver Arena in Peoria, Illinois.

The fourteenth ranked Bradley Braves defeated the Illinois State Redbirds in the championship game, 89-59, and won their 2nd MVC Tournament title and earned an automatic bid to the 1988 NCAA tournament.

== Bracket ==
Quarterfinals; March 5, 1988
1	No. 14 Bradley	93
8	Indiana State	74
4	Southern Illinois	87
5	Creighton	89
2	Wichita State	74
7	Tulsa	66
3	Illinois State	72
6	Drake	60

Semifinals; March 6, 1988
1	No. 14 Bradley	101
5	Creighton	77
2	Wichita State	51
3	Illinois State	59

Final; March 7, 1988
1	No. 14 Bradley	89
3	Illinois State	59
