= 1987–88 UNLV Runnin' Rebels basketball team =

American college basketball season

1987–88 UNLV Runnin' Rebels basketball

PCAA Regular Season Champions

NCAA tournament, second round
- Conference: Pacific Coast Athletic Association

Ranking
- Coaches: No. 15
- AP: No. 12
- Record: 28–6 (15–3 PCAA)
- Head coach: Jerry Tarkanian (15th season)
- Assistant coaches: Tim Grgurich (7th season); Ralph Readout (6th season); Keith Starr (2nd season)
- Home arena: Thomas & Mack Center

1987–88 Pacific Coast Athletic Association men's basketball standings
	Conf.				Overall
Team	W		L	PCT	W		L	PCT
No. 12 UNLV	15	–	3	.833	28	–	6	.824
UC Santa Barbara	13	–	5	.722	22	–	8	.733
Utah State †	13	–	5	.722	21	–	10	.677
Long Beach State	11	–	7	.611	17	–	12	.586
UC Irvine	9	–	9	.500	16	–	14	.533
New Mexico State	8	–	10	.444	16	–	16	.500
San Jose State	8	–	10	.444	14	–	15	.483
Cal State Fullerton	7	–	11	.389	12	–	17	.414
Fresno State	6	–	12	.333	9	–	19	.321
Pacific	0	–	18	.000	5	–	24	.172
† 1988 PCAA tournament winner

The 1987–88 UNLV Runnin' Rebels basketball team represented the University of Nevada Las Vegas in NCAA Division I men's competition in the 1985–86 season under head coach Jerry Tarkanian. The team played its home games in the Thomas & Mack Center, and was a member of the Pacific Coast Athletic Association (PCAA), now known as the Big West Conference. The Rebels won the regular season conference and PCAA tournament titles. The team finished with a record of 28–6 (15–3 PCAA) and reached the second round of the NCAA tournament.

== Roster ==
1987–88 UNLV Runnin' Rebels men's basketball team
Players
Coaches

Pos.	#	Name	Height	Weight	Year	Hometown
G	5	Stacey Cvijanovich	6 ft 3 in (1.91 m)	200 lb (91 kg)	So	Oxnard, California
F	23	Gerald Paddio	6 ft 8 in (2.03 m)	195 lb (88 kg)	Sr	Rayne, Louisiana
F	31	Stacey Augmon	6 ft 8 in (2.03 m)	206 lb (93 kg)	Fr	Pasadena, California
C		Anthony Todd num=32	6 ft 9 in (2.06 m)	225 lb (102 kg)	Sr	San Diego, California
C	34	James Jones	6 ft 9 in (2.06 m)	220 lb (100 kg)	So	Cincinnati, Ohio
F	35	Moses Scurry	6 ft 7 in (2.01 m)	220 lb (100 kg)	So	Brooklyn, New York
G	50	Greg Anthony	6 ft 2 in (1.88 m)	190 lb (86 kg)	Fr	Las Vegas, Nevada
F	53	Chris Jeter	6 ft 8 in (2.03 m)	216 lb (98 kg)	Fr	San Diego, California
G		John Smith	6 ft 2 in (1.88 m)	—	Fr

Head coach

- Jerry Tarkanian (Fresno State)

Assistant coach(es)

- Tim Grgurich (Pittsburgh)
- Mark Warkentien (Cal State Fullerton)
- Ralph Readout (Ohio)

Legend

- (C) Team captain
- (S) Suspended
- (I) Ineligible
- (W) Walk-on
- Injured
- Current redshirt

Roster

== Schedule and results ==
Date time, TV	Rank^{#}	Opponent^{#}	Result	Record	Site (attendance) city, state
Regular season
Dec 3, 1987*	No. 19	at Hawaii–Loa; Pearl Harbor Classic	W 114–46	1–0	Neal S. Blaisdell Center (500); Honolulu, Hawaii
Dec 4, 1987*	No. 19	at Hawaii–Hilo; Pearl Harbor Classic	W 113–65	2–0	Neal S. Blaisdell Center (2,425); Honolulu, Hawaii
Dec 5, 1987*	No. 19	at Hawaii–Loa; Pearl Harbor Classic	W 120–47	3–0	Neal S. Blaisdell Center (500); Honolulu, Hawaii
Dec 8, 1987*	No. 17	at Nevada	W 98–96	4–0	Lawlor Events Center (11,388); Reno, Nevada
Dec 12, 1987*	No. 17	at Houston	W 89–69	5–0	Hofheinz Pavilion (6,021); Houston, Texas
Dec 21, 1987*	No. 15	Tennessee Tech	W 103–76	6–0	Thomas & Mack Center (17,202); Paradise, Nevada
Dec 22, 1987*	No. 15	Creighton	W 90–59	7–0	Thomas & Mack Center (15,957); Paradise, Nevada
Dec 28, 1987*	No. 15	Wisconsin; UNLV Holiday Classic	W 102–65	8–0	Thomas & Mack Center (15,971); Paradise, Nevada
Dec 29, 1987*	No. 15	Louisiana State; UNLV Holiday Classic	W 78–59	9–0	Thomas & Mack Center (16,596); Paradise, Nevada
Jan 2, 1988	No. 15	at New Mexico State	W 69–64	10–0 (1–0)	Pan American Center (10,812); Las Cruces, New Mexico
Jan 4, 1988	No. 13	at Long Beach State	W 71–68	11–0 (2–0)	Long Beach Arena (4,286); Long Beach, California
Jan 7, 1988	No. 13	UC Santa Barbara	L 60–62	11–1 (2–1)	Thomas & Mack Center (18,500); Paradise, Nevada
Jan 9, 1988	No. 13	UC Irvine	W 103–68	12–1 (3–1)	Thomas & Mack Center (15,506); Paradise, Nevada
Jan 16, 1988	No. 13	at Cal State Fullerton	W 63–57	13–1 (4–1)	Titan Gym (4,113); Fullerton, California
Jan 17, 1988*	No. 13	at Providence	W 92–72	14–1	Providence Civic Center (13,100); Providence, Rhode Island
Jan 19, 1988	No. 8	at Utah State	W 87–83	15–1 (5–1)	Dee Glen Smith Spectrum (10,270); Logan, Utah
Jan 21, 1988	No. 8	at San Jose State	W 95–83	16–1 (6–1)	San Jose Civic Auditorium (2,612); San Jose, California
Jan 24, 1988*	No. 8	No. 3 Temple	W 59–58	17–1	Thomas & Mack Center (19,000); Paradise, Nevada
Jan 28, 1988	No. 4	Fresno State	W 87–71	18–1 (7–1)	Thomas & Mack Center (17,934); Paradise, Nevada
Jan 30, 1988	No. 4	Pacific	W 92–67	19–1 (8–1)	Thomas & Mack Center (17,583); Paradise, Nevada
Feb 4, 1988	No. 2	at UC Irvine	W 99–77	20–1 (9–1)	Bren Events Center (5,000); Irvine, California
Feb 6, 1988	No. 2	at UC Santa Barbara	L 66–71	20–2 (9–2)	The Thunderdome (6,000); Santa Barbara, California
Feb 11, 1988	No. 7	Cal State Fullerton	W 77–61	21–2 (10–2)	Thomas & Mack Center (17,530); Paradise, Nevada
Feb 13, 1988*	No. 7	Missouri	L 79–81	21–3	Thomas & Mack Center (19,000); Paradise, Nevada
Feb 18, 1988	No. 11	Utah State	W 94–74	22–3 (11–2)	Thomas & Mack Center (19,250); Paradise, Nevada
Feb 20, 1988	No. 11	San Jose State	W 85–68	23–3 (12–2)	Thomas & Mack Center (16,798); Paradise, Nevada
Feb 25, 1988	No. 8	at Pacific	W 77–61	24–3 (13–2)	Alex G. Spanos Center (5,424); Stockton, California
Feb 27, 1988	No. 8	at Fresno State	W 71–60	25–3 (14–2)	Selland Arena (10,159); Fresno, California
Mar 3, 1988	No. 5	Long Beach State	L 77–79	25–4 (14–3)	Thomas & Mack Center (18,310); Paradise, Nevada
Mar 5, 1988	No. 5	New Mexico State	W 86–68	26–4 (15–3)	Thomas & Mack Center (19,371); Paradise, Nevada
PCAA tournament
Mar 11, 1988*	No. 7	vs. Cal State Fullerton; Quarterfinals	W 61–56	27–4	The Forum (9,587); Inglewood, California
Mar 12, 1988*	No. 7	vs. UC Irvine; Semifinals	L 70–74	27–5	The Forum (12,066); Inglewood, California
NCAA tournament
Mar 18, 1988*	(4 W) No. 12	vs. (13 W) SW Missouri State; First round	W 54–50	28–5	Pauley Pavilion (11,175); Los Angeles, California
Mar 20, 1988*; CBS	(4 W) No. 12	vs. (5 W) No. 17 Iowa; Second round	L 86–104	28–6	Pauley Pavilion (12,901); Los Angeles, California
*Non-conference game. ^{#}Rankings from AP poll. (#) Tournament seedings in parentheses. W=West.

== Rankings ==
Ranking movements Legend: ██ Increase in ranking ██ Decrease in ranking — = Not ranked
	Week																
Poll	Pre	1	2	3	4	5	6	7	8	9	10	11	12	13	14	15	Final
AP	—	19	17	15	15	15	13	13	8	4	2	7	11	8	5	7	12
Coaches	Not released	18	17	15	14	14	12	13	7	5	3	7	11	8	6	8	15

== See also ==
- UNLV Runnin' Rebels basketball
- 1988 NCAA Division I men's basketball tournament
