= Ferrell Center =

College sports arena in Texas, United States

- Paul J. Meyer Arena
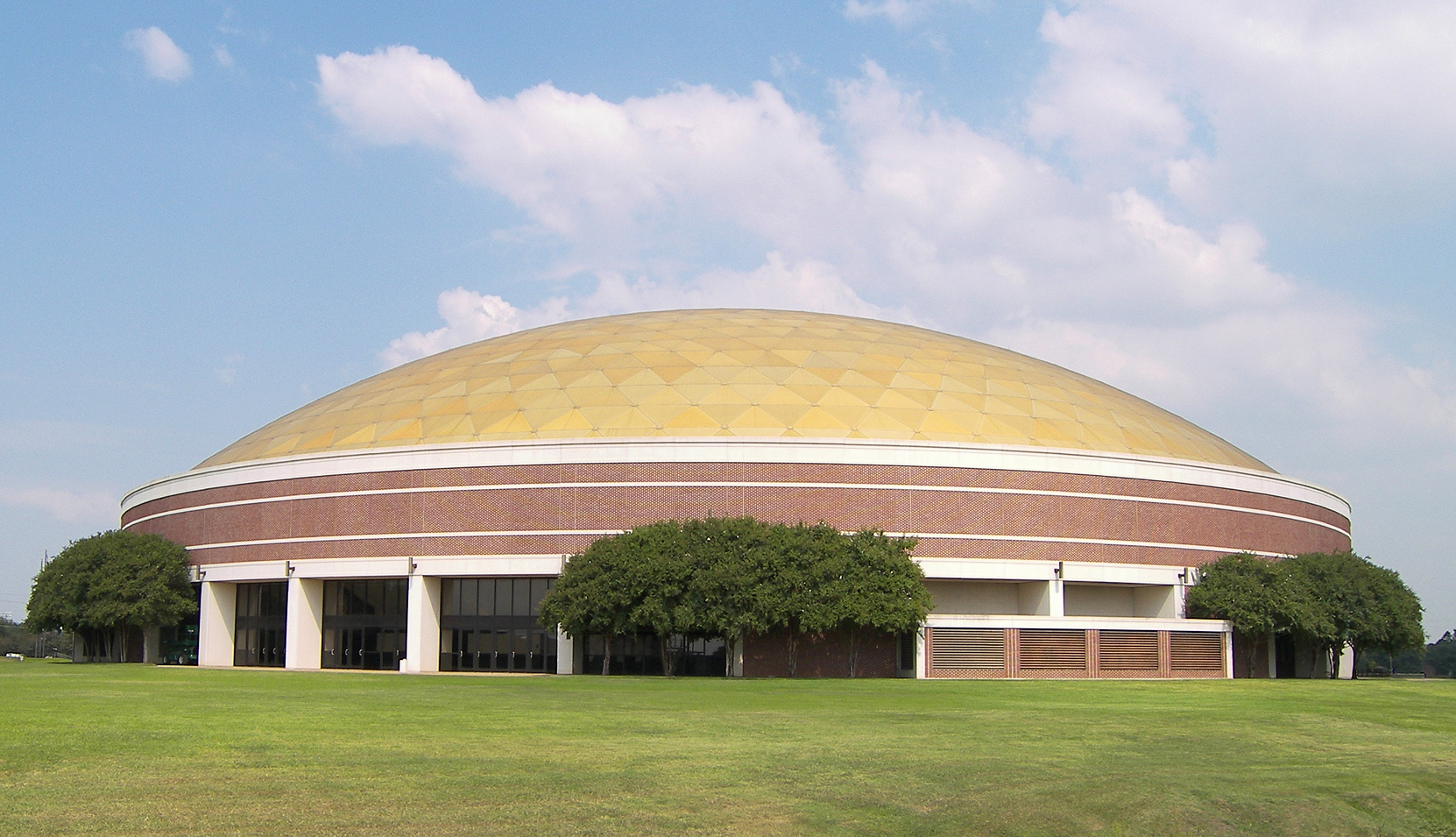
- Interactive map of Ferrell Center
- Former names: Baylor Events Center (planning)
- Location: 1900 South University Parks Drive; Waco, TX 76706
- Coordinates: 31°32′52.45″N 97°06′21.49″W
- Owner: Baylor University
- Operator: Baylor University Athletics
- Capacity: 10,284 (basketball, 1998–present); 10,084 (basketball, 1988–1998); 6,000 (volleyball); 12,000 (concerts)
- Surface: Hardwood maple (inst. 2002)

Construction
- Groundbreaking: July 1, 1987
- Opened: September 22, 1988
- Cost: $12.5 million ($34 million in 2025 dollars)
- Architects: Crain & Anderson, Inc.
- Structural engineer: Walter P Moore
- General contractor: Waco Construction Co.

Tenant
- Baylor Bears (NCAA DI) (1988–present)

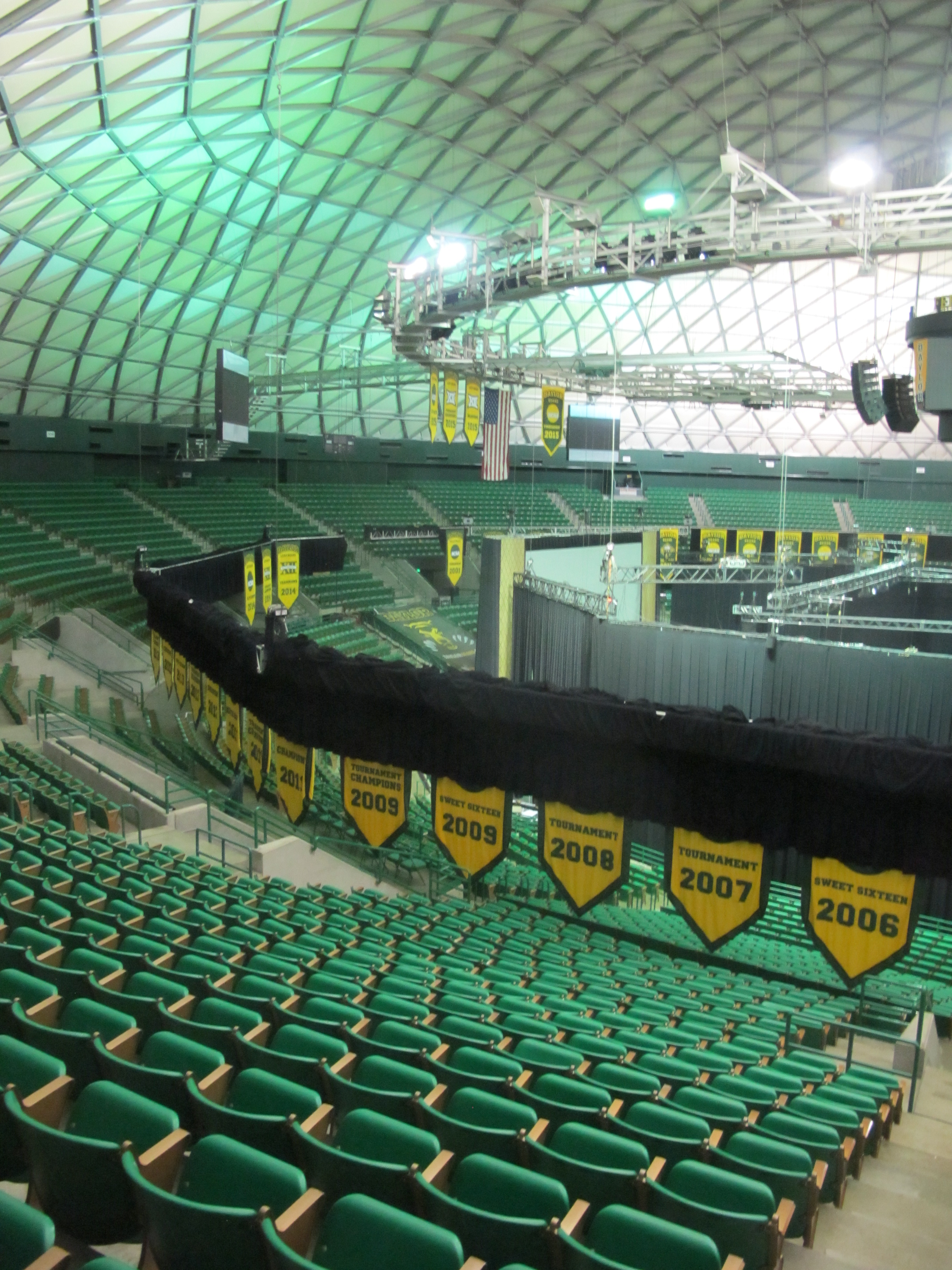
Interior, Set Up for Donor Party 2016

The Paul J. Meyer Arena, which is part of the Ferrell Center, is an arena in Waco, Texas. Built in 1988 and located adjacent to the Brazos River, it is home to the Baylor University Bears volleyball, acrobatics, and tumbling teams. It is named for Charles R. Ferrell, a Baylor student and legacy who died in 1967, and whose family's estate was a major benefactor of the arena. The building replaced the Heart O' Texas Coliseum as the school's primary indoor athletic facility. The men's and women's basketball teams relocated to the newly constructed Foster Pavilion in 2024.

== Dimensions and layout ==
The brick and concrete building is capped by a round, gold-plated dome 321 feet (98 m) across and 111 feet (34 m) above the playing surface at its apex. It contains 41 rows of seats, seven of which can be retracted for other events. The dome weighs approximately 175 tons and is constructed of structural aluminum beams covered with anodized gold panels with 4" of vinyl faced insulation on the back (in) side on the panel. The dome is fastened together with Huck fasteners, which are manufactured in Waco. Temcor is the manufacturer of the roof. The surface area of aluminum panels is approximately 3 acres (12,000 m^{2}). During erection, the dome was suspended by 32 cables on a 220' tall tower. The tower was stabilized during erection with 7 guy cables. Concrete poured to date 9,650 cubic yards (7,380 m^{3}). Structural steel is approximately 500 tons. General description of construction: Drilled piers with concrete support beams for seating bowl. Slab on grade, slabs and structural pan deck slab (over sub-concourse). Precast concrete construction for seating bowl. Exterior facade is architectural precast with white concrete and 5/8" thick brickettes cast into the panels. The panels are attached to a steel structure.

Within the center is the Paul J. Meyer Arena which seats 10,284 for basketball, 6,000 for volleyball, 8,000 for concerts, and can seat up to 1,000 for banquets. During the summer of 2010, the Ferrell Center received a brand new, HD center-hung scoreboard. This consists of 4 new HD video screens, and 2 LED 360 degree rings on top and bottom, supplying fans with stats, replays, and more. Along the 4 corners, there are 4 side panels, also providing additional stats. With the addition of the new basketball playing floor the Bears and Lady Bears have the opportunity to be on the hardwood more days out of the year with less conversions time between events and games or practice times. In addition a 43,000 sq ft (4,000 m^{2}) basketball practice facility was constructed in 2006 on the north west side of the building. It contains 2 full practice courts, a strength and conditioning center, and new offices for the men and women's basketball staff.

Baylor Basketball at the Ferrell Center
Year	Men	Women
1988–89	4–11	1–9
1989–90	9–6	2–11
1990–91	6–8	5–6
1991–92	7–7	4–7
1992–93	11–3	5–5
1993–94	11–3	6–4
1994–95	7–8	8–6
1995–96	7–7	8–7
1996–97	14–3	8–5
1997–98	10–4	13–2
1998–99	5–10	10–6
1999–00	11–7	6–7
2000–01	14–3	12–2
2001–02	12–4	16–2
2002–03	10–6	17–4
2003–04	6–11	12–2
2004–05	8–9	14–0
2005–06	4–4	12–1
2006–07	13–5	16–3
2007–08	12–4	18–1
2008–09	14–5	14–2
2009–10	15–1	15–2
2010–11	15–3	21–0
2011–12	14–3	19–0
2012–13	15–5	17–0
2013–14	13–4	19–2
2014–15	16–2	17–0
2015–16	14–5	18–0
2016-17	15-2	17–1
2017-18	13-5	20–0
2018-19	13-5	19–0
2019-20	14-1	17–0
2020-21	11-0	12–1
2021-22	15-2	14–1
Total	378–166	432–99

== Notable events ==
The inaugural event held in the area was a political rally for then US president Ronald Reagan on September 22, 1988. Through the years, the arena has hosted many famous acts on its stage including: George Strait, Garth Brooks, Keith Urban, Hootie and the Blowfish, Neil Diamond, Dolly Parton, Steven Curtis Chapman, Michael W. Smith, Amy Grant, the Harlem Globetrotters, and many more. Many world leaders have also spent time on the stage including Colin Powell, Archbishop Desmond Tutu, and former president George W. Bush and first lady Barbara Bush, all part of the President's Forum Lecture Series.

Fans have also seen the best of college basketball on the court including major upsets over former conference foe Arkansas in the early 1990s and more recently with the Bears defeating #4-ranked Kansas in 2001, and the Lady Bears knocking off top-ten ranked Iowa State the same year. Since the start of the 2010–11 season through the end of the 2019–20 season, the Men's team is a combined 128–34 at home while the Women's team is a combined 167–3 in the same span, making the Ferrell Center one of the toughest places to play in the Big 12.

The Baylor and Waco communities have made the Ferrell Center a tough place to play basketball with record crowds in attendance since the arrival of Kim Mulkey, including a facility record crowd of 10,550 while winning the 2005 women's Big 12 Conference regular season title. Following the record crowd, Mulkey led the Lady Bears to a first ever NCAA Women's National Championship, marking the first national championship for the Big 12 in women's basketball. The arena also plays home to Baylor volleyball. The last game of the men's basketball team at the Ferrell Center was a 107–48 Blowout against Mississippi Valley State Delta Devils on December 22, 2023.

== See also ==
- List of NCAA Division I basketball arenas
