= 1988 Pacific Coast Athletic Association men's basketball tournament =

- Classification: Division I
- Season: 1987–88
- Teams: 10
- Site: The Forum; Inglewood, CA
- Champions: Utah State (1st title)
- Winning coach: Rod Tueller (1st title)
- MVP: Wayne Engelstad (UC Irvine)
- Pacific Coast Athletic Association men's basketball tournaments

1987–88 Pacific Coast Athletic Association men's basketball standings
	Conf.				Overall
Team	W		L	PCT	W		L	PCT
No. 12 UNLV	15	–	3	.833	28	–	6	.824
UC Santa Barbara	13	–	5	.722	22	–	8	.733
Utah State †	13	–	5	.722	21	–	10	.677
Long Beach State	11	–	7	.611	17	–	12	.586
UC Irvine	9	–	9	.500	16	–	14	.533
New Mexico State	8	–	10	.444	16	–	16	.500
San Jose State	8	–	10	.444	14	–	15	.483
Cal State Fullerton	7	–	11	.389	12	–	17	.414
Fresno State	6	–	12	.333	9	–	19	.321
Pacific	0	–	18	.000	5	–	24	.172
† 1988 PCAA tournament winner

The 1988 Pacific Coast Athletic Association men's basketball tournament (now known as the Big West Conference men's basketball tournament) was held March 10–13 at The Forum in Inglewood, California. This was the final tournament while the conference was still known as the PCAA; it would change to the Big West for the following season.

Utah State defeated UC Irvine in the final, 86–79, and captured their first PCAA/Big West championship. The fifth-seeded Anteaters upset three-time defending champions UNLV in the semifinal round.

The Aggies, in turn, received an automatic bid to the 1988 NCAA tournament. Fellow PCAA members UNLV and UC Santa Barbara (the Gauchos' first-ever tournament appearance) joined them in the field with at-large bids.

== Format ==
The tournament field expanded beyond eight teams for the first time, with all ten conference members in participation. The ten teams were seeded in the bracket based on regular season record.

The top six seeds were given a bye into the quarterfinal round while the four lowest-seeded teams were placed into the first round.

== Bracket ==
First round Thursday, March 10
9	Fresno State	59
8	Cal State Fullerton	73
7	San José State	76
10	Pacific	60

Quarterfinals; Friday, March 11
1	No. 7 UNLV	61
8	Cal State Fullerton	56
5	UC Irvine	74
4	Long Beach State	69
3	UC Santa Barbara	56
6	New Mexico State	52
7	San José State	72
2	Utah State	80

Semifinals; Saturday, March 12
1	#7 UNLV	70
5	UC Irvine	74
3	UC Santa Barbara	66
2	Utah State	73

Championship; Sunday, March 13
5	UC Irvine	79
2	Utah State	86
