= 1987–88 UC Santa Barbara Gauchos men's basketball team =

American college basketball season

1987–88 UC Santa Barbara Gauchos men's basketball

NCAA tournament
- Conference: Pacific Coast Athletic Association
- Record: 22–8 (13–5 PCAA)
- Head coach: Jerry Pimm (5th season)
- Home arena: The Thunderdome

1987–88 Pacific Coast Athletic Association men's basketball standings
	Conf.				Overall
Team	W		L	PCT	W		L	PCT
No. 12 UNLV	15	–	3	.833	28	–	6	.824
UC Santa Barbara	13	–	5	.722	22	–	8	.733
Utah State †	13	–	5	.722	21	–	10	.677
Long Beach State	11	–	7	.611	17	–	12	.586
UC Irvine	9	–	9	.500	16	–	14	.533
New Mexico State	8	–	10	.444	16	–	16	.500
San Jose State	8	–	10	.444	14	–	15	.483
Cal State Fullerton	7	–	11	.389	12	–	17	.414
Fresno State	6	–	12	.333	9	–	19	.321
Pacific	0	–	18	.000	5	–	24	.172
† 1988 PCAA tournament winner

The 1987–88 UC Santa Barbara Gauchos men's basketball team represented the University of California, Santa Barbara during the 1987–88 college basketball season. They were led by head coach Jerry Pimm in his 5th season at UCSB. The Gauchos were members of the Pacific Coast Athletic Association and played their home games at the UC Santa Barbara Events Center, also known as The Thunderdome.

UCSB finished the season 22–8, 13–5 in PCAA play to finish second in the conference regular season standings. They received an at-large bid to the NCAA tournament – the school's first appearance in the “Big Dance.” As the No. 10 seed in the Southeast Region, they lost to No. 7 seed Maryland in the opening round.

== Roster ==
1987–88 UC Santa Barbara Gauchos men's basketball team
Players
Coaches

Pos.	#	Name	Height	Weight	Year	Hometown
G	22	Brian Shaw	6 ft 6 in (1.98 m)	195 lb (88 kg)	Sr	Oakland, California
G	15	Carrick DeHart	6 ft 4 in (1.93 m)	—	So	Inglewood, California
F	35	Gary Gray	6 ft 9 in (2.06 m)	—	Fr
F	55	Eric McArthur	6 ft 7 in (2.01 m)	—	So	South Pasadena, California

Head coach

- Jerry Pimm (USC)

Assistant coach(es)

Legend

- (C) Team captain
- (S) Suspended
- (I) Ineligible
- (W) Walk-on
- Injured
- Current redshirt

== Schedule and results ==
Date time, TV	Rank^{#}	Opponent^{#}	Result	Record	Site (attendance) city, state
Regular season
Nov 27, 1987*		Santa Clara	W 67–64	1–0	The Thunderdome; Santa Barbara, California
Nov 30, 1987*		at San Diego	W 72–67	2–0	USD Sports Center; San Diego, California
Dec 3, 1987*		Oregon State	W 71–70	3–0	The Thunderdome; Santa Barbara, California
Dec 12, 1987*		Westmont	W 70–62	4–0	The Thunderdome; Santa Barbara, California
Dec 17, 1987*		Pepperdine	W 76–68	5–0	The Thunderdome; Santa Barbara, California
Dec 21, 1987*		Montana State	W 71–64	6–0	The Thunderdome; Santa Barbara, California
Dec 23, 1987*		NC State	W 96–78	7–0	The Thunderdome; Santa Barbara, California
Dec 28, 1987*		vs. Stanford; Hoosier Classic	L 65–75	7–1	Market Square Arena; Indianapolis, Indiana
Dec 29, 1987*		vs. Penn; Hoosier Classic	W 82–52	8–1	Market Square Arena; Indianapolis, Indiana
Jan 4, 1988		at UC Irvine	W 81–78	9–1 (1–0)	Bren Events Center; Irvine, California
Jan 7, 1988		at No. 13 UNLV	W 62–60	10–1 (2–0)	Thomas & Mack Center; Las Vegas, Nevada
Jan 9, 1988		at Cal State Fullerton	W 67–55	11–1 (3–0)	Titan Gym; Fullerton, California
Jan 14, 1988		San Jose State	L 61–67	11–2 (3–1)	The Thunderdome; Santa Barbara, California
Jan 16, 1988		Utah State	L 72–73	11–3 (3–2)	The Thunderdome; Santa Barbara, California
Jan 21, 1988		at Fresno State	W 75–61	12–3 (4–2)	Selland Arena; Fresno, California
Jan 23, 1988		at Pacific	W 68–64	13–3 (5–2)	Alex G. Spanos Center; Stockton, California
Jan 28, 1988		New Mexico State	W 66–63	14–3 (6–2)	The Thunderdome; Santa Barbara, California
Jan 30, 1988		Long Beach State	L 76–77	14–4 (6–3)	The Thunderdome; Santa Barbara, California
Feb 4, 1988		Cal State Fullerton	W 57–56	15–4 (7–3)	The Thunderdome; Santa Barbara, California
Feb 6, 1988		No. 2 UNLV	W 71–66	16–4 (8–3)	The Thunderdome; Santa Barbara, California
Feb 11, 1988		at Utah State	L 62–85	16–5 (8–4)	Dee Glen Smith Spectrum; Logan, Utah
Feb 13, 1988		at San Jose State	W 65–64	17–5 (9–4)	San Jose Civic Auditorium; San Jose, California
Feb 18, 1988		Pacific	W 97–59	18–5 (10–4)	The Thunderdome; Santa Barbara, California
Feb 20, 1988		Fresno State	W 77–60	19–5 (11–4)	The Thunderdome; Santa Barbara, California
Feb 25, 1988		at Long Beach State	W 81–73	20–5 (12–4)	Gold Mine; Long Beach, California
Feb 27, 1988		at New Mexico State	L 57–81	20–6 (12–5)	Pan American Center; Las Cruces, New Mexico
Mar 5, 1988		UC Irvine	W 83–77	21–6 (13–5)	The Thunderdome; Santa Barbara, California
Big West tournament
Mar 11, 1988*	(3)	vs. (6) New Mexico State; Quarterfinals	W 56–52	22–6	The Forum; Inglewood, California
Mar 12, 1988*	(3)	vs. (2) Utah State; Semifinals	L 66–73	22–7	The Forum; Inglewood, California
NCAA tournament
Mar 18, 1988*	(10 SE)	vs. (7 SE) Maryland; First Round	L 82–92	22–8	Riverfront Coliseum; Cincinnati, Ohio
*Non-conference game. ^{#}Rankings from AP Poll; Source. (#) Tournament seedings in parentheses. SE=Southeast. All times are in Pacific Time.

== Awards and honors ==
- Brian Shaw – PCAA Player of the Year

== 1988 NBA draft ==
Round	Pick	Player	NBA club
1	24	Brian Shaw	Boston Celtics
