= Eddie Bird =

American basketball player

Personal information
- Born: 1966 (age 59–60)
- Listed height: 6 ft 6 in (1.98 m)
- Listed weight: 190 lb (86 kg)

Career information
- High school: Springs Valley (French Lick, Indiana)
- College: Indiana State (1987–1991)
- NBA draft: 1991: undrafted
- Position: Shooting guard / small forward
- Number: 42

Career history
- 1991: Suncoast Sunblasters

Career highlights
- MVC Freshman of the Year (1988)

Eddie Bird (born 1966) is an American former basketball player who played college basketball for the Indiana State Sycamores from 1987 to 1991. He is the younger brother of National Basketball Association (NBA) legend Larry Bird.

== Basketball career ==
Bird attended Springs Valley High School where he played basketball and averaged 21.8 points a game during his senior year, leading the school to 18 wins in 24 games. He joined Indiana State University in 1986 but sat out his first year due to being academically ineligible. During the 1987–1988 season, he averaged 15.3 points per game and was named the Missouri Valley Conference Freshman of the Year. He played for Indiana State until 1991 and averaged 14.0 points per game during his college career.

Following his college career, Bird was drafted by the Suncoast Sunblasters in the second round of the 1991 USBL draft. He appeared in eight games for the Sunblasters, averaging 6.6 points per game. In July the same year, he attended an 11-day free agent camp with the NBA's Sacramento Kings.

== Personal life ==
Bird is the youngest of four brothers.
