= Extraco Events Center =

Sports venue in Waco, Texas

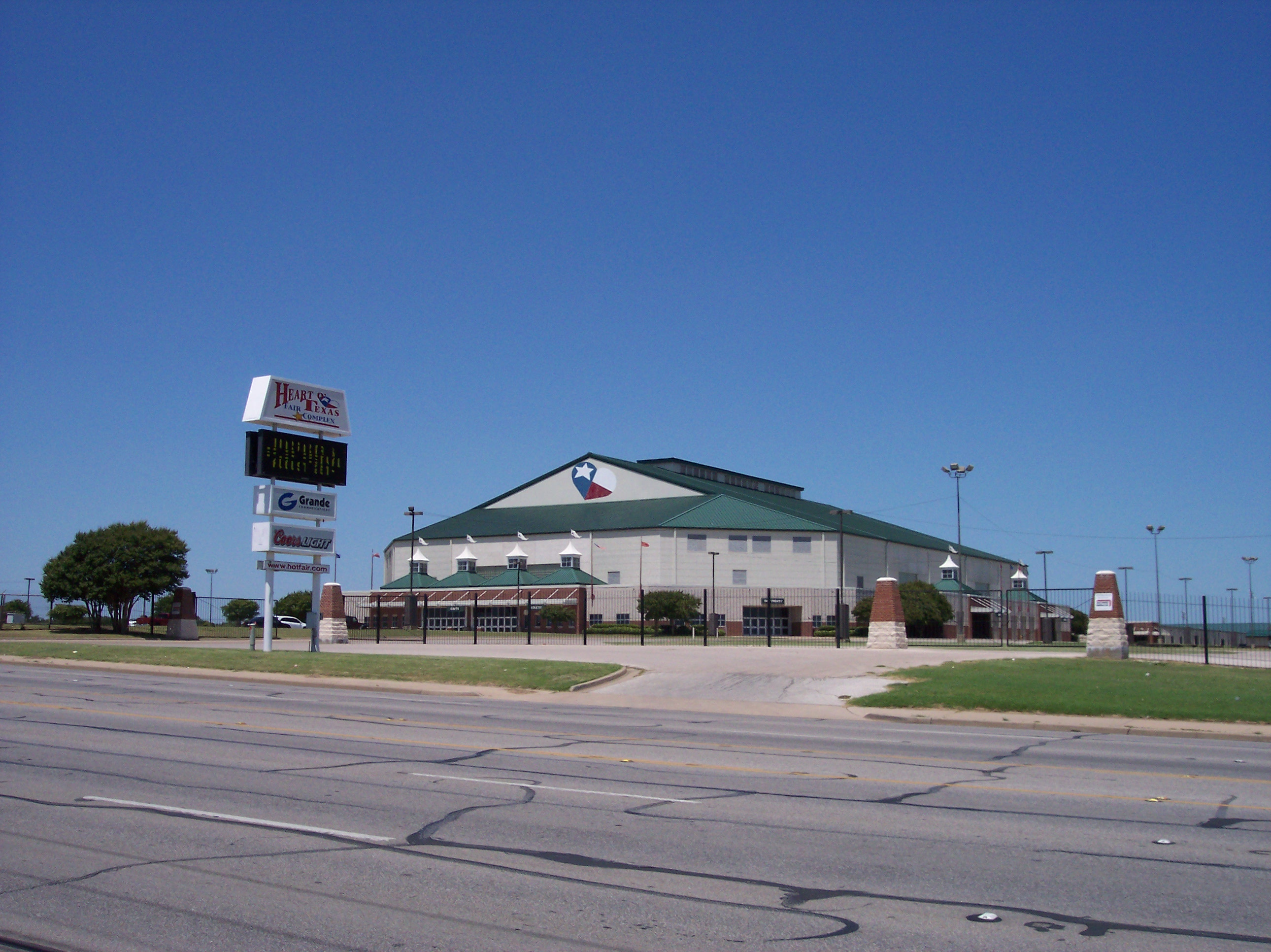
- In August 2010, Waco's Heart O' Texas Coliseum was renamed Extraco Events Center
- Interactive map of Extraco Events Center
- Former names: Heart O' Texas Fair Complex (1953–2010)
- Location: 4601 Bosque Boulevard; Waco, Texas 76710 U.S.
- Coordinates: 31°32′19″N 97°11′12″W
- Owner: McLennan County
- Operator: Heart of Texas Fair Inc.
- Capacity: 9,000

Construction
- Groundbreaking: January 1952
- Opened: April 11, 1953
- Renovated: 2000–2005
- Cost: US$1.2 million

Tenants
- Baylor Bears (NCAA) (1953–1988); Waco Wizards (WPHL) (1996–2000)

Website
- www.extracoeventscenter.com

The Heart O' Texas Fair Complex, now known as the Extraco Events Center, is located in Waco, Texas, United States. It was once the prime basketball facility for Baylor University. The H.O.T. Coliseum was constructed after McLennan County voters authorized a bond issue of $1.2 million in the early 1950s. Despite public criticism that might be directed toward the board and individual members, it was the board's unanimous decision to build portions of the entire plant that the available money would permit. The last of five contracts was signed on January 9, 1952, and construction of the complex began soon afterward. The complex, livestock barn, ticket booths and several small buildings were constructed, paving was done and fencing enclosed the grounds. In the spring of 1953, the complex was completed, and on April 11, the formal opening was held. The complex remained home to Bears basketball, and Waco's largest concert venue, until Ferrell Center, was built in 1988.

All facilities and grounds of the Fair Complex underwent renovations and/or reconstruction throughout the years of 2000 to 2005. The Complex now covers 50 acres (200,000 m^{2}) of land containing modernized facilities, 700 stalls, 250 RV hook-ups and parking areas able to accommodate over 3,800 vehicles. Its facilities consist of the Heart O' Texas Coliseum, Back Porch Club, Show Pavilion, General Exhibits Building, Creative Arts Building and the recently constructed Stall Barn. The Events Center complex seats 6,000 for rodeos and up to 9,000 for concerts.

In August 2010, officials announced that Extraco Banks signed a long-term naming rights deal, officially changing the name of the grounds to the Extraco Events Center.

The Extraco Events Center also hosts yearly events such as the Ringling Bros. and Barnum & Bailey Circus, monster trucks, major concert acts, and has also hosted WWE Raw on several occasions.
