= Boston University Terriers men's basketball statistical leaders =

The Boston University Terriers basketball statistical leaders are individual statistical leaders of the Boston University Terriers men's basketball program in various categories, including points, rebounds, assists, steals, and blocks. Within those areas, the lists identify single-game, single-season, and career leaders. The Terriers represent Boston University in the NCAA's Patriot League.

Boston University began competing in intercollegiate basketball in 1901. However, the school's record book does not generally list records from before the 1950s, as records from before this period are often incomplete and inconsistent. Since scoring was much lower in this era, and teams played much fewer games during a typical season, it is likely that few or no players from this era would appear on these lists anyway.

The NCAA did not officially record assists as a stat until the 1983–84 season, and blocks and steals until the 1985–86 season, but Boston University's record books includes players in these stats before these seasons. These lists are updated through the end of the 2019–20 season.

== Scoring ==
Career
Rk	Player	Points	Seasons
1	Tunji Awojobi	2,308	1993–94 1994–95 1995–96 1996–97
2	John Holland	2,212	2007–08 2008–09 2009–10 2010–11
3	Drederick Irving	1,931	1984–85 1985–86 1986–87 1987–88
4	Javante McCoy	1,930	2017–18 2018–19 2019–20 2020–21 2021–22
5	Corey Lowe	1,815	2006–07 2007–08 2008–09 2009–10
6	Walter Whyte	1,696	2017–18 2019–20 2020–21 2021–22 2022–23
7	Jim Hayes	1,679	1967–68 1968–69 1969–70
8	Steve Wright	1,641	1976–77 1977–78 1978–79 1979–80
9	Max Mahoney	1,551	2016–17 2017–18 2018–19 2019–20
10	Paul Hendricks	1,527	1982–83 1983–84 1984–85 1985–86 1986–87

Season
Rk	Player	Points	Season
1	John Holland	673	2009–10
2	Tunji Awojobi	658	1995–96
3	John Holland	654	2010–11
4	Darryl Partin	628	2011–12
5	Jim Hayes	616	1968–69
6	Drederick Irving	616	1987–88
7	Tunji Awojobi	615	1994–95
8	Javante McCoy	609	2021–22
9	Michael McNair	576	2025–26
10	Jim Hayes	565	1967–68
	Drederick Irving	565	1986–87

Single game
Rk	Player	Points	Season	Opponent
1	Jim Hayes	47	1969–70	Springfield
2	Kevin Thomas	46	1955–56	Tennessee
3	Kevin Thomas	45	1954–55	Rutgers
4	Randy Cross	44	1963–64	Holy Cross
5	Tunji Awojobi	43	1995–96	Vermont
	John Holland	43	2009–10	Delaware
7	Steve Wright	42	1978–79	Connecticut
8	Tony DaCosta	40	1988–89	Northeastern (AE Semis)
9	Richard Lee	39	1966–67	New Hampshire
10	Ken Boyd	38	1970–71	Lafayette
	John Holland	38	2007–08	Hartford
	Max Mahoney	38	2019–20	Binghamton

== Rebounds ==
Career
Rk	Player	Rebounds	Seasons
1	Tunji Awojobi	1,237	1993–94 1994–95 1995–96 1996–97
2	James Garvin	935	1970–71 1971–72 1972–73
3	Sukhmail Mathon	875	2017–18 2018–19 2019–20 2020–21 2021–22
4	Walter Whyte	836	2017–18 2019–20 2020–21 2021–22 2022–23
5	Paul Hendricks	805	1982–83 1983–84 1984–85 1985–86 1986–87
6	John Osgood	784	1963–64 1964–65 1965–66
7	Ken Boyd	772	1970–71 1971–72 1972–73 1973–74
8	Dom Morris	741	2010–11 2011–12 2012–13 2013–14
9	John Holland	725	2007–08 2008–09 2009–10 2010–11
10	Max Mahoney	707	2016–17 2017–18 2018–19 2019–20

Season
Rk	Player	Rebounds	Season
1	Ed Washington	382	1958–59
2	Tunji Awojobi	365	1994–95
3	Sukhmail Mathon	357	2021–22
4	James Garvin	342	1972–73
5	James Garvin	335	1971–72
	John Osgood	335	1965–66
7	Kevin Thomas	322	1954–55
8	Tunji Awojobi	314	1995–96
9	Jim Hayes	297	1967–68
10	Dick Moreshead	292	1962–63

Single game
Rk	Player	Rebounds	Season	Opponent
1	Kevin Thomas	34	1957–58	Boston College
2	James Garvin	27	1971–72	Brandeis

== Assists ==
Career
Rk	Player	Assists	Seasons
1	Jeff Timberlake	772	1985–86 1986–87 1987–88 1988–89
2	Shawn Teague	600	1982–83 1983–84 1984–85
3	LeVar Folk	519	1995–96 1996–97 1997–98 1998–99
4	D.J. Irving	470	2010–11 2011–12 2012–13 2013–14
5	Ken Leary	508	1962–63 1963–64 1964–65
6	Corey Lowe	411	2006–07 2007–08 2008–09 2009–10
7	Maurice Watson Jr.	410	2012–13 2013–14
8	Brett Brown	404	1979–80 1980–81 1981–82 1982–83
9	Javante McCoy	379	2017–18 2018–19 2019–20 2020–21 2021–22
10	Kevin Fitzgerald	372	2000–01 2001–02 2002–03 2003–04

Season
Rk	Player	Assists	Season
1	Maurice Watson Jr.	248	2013–14
2	Jeff Timberlake	238	1988–89
3	Steven Key	228	1989–90
4	Shawn Teague	218	1983–84
5	Shawn Teague	217	1984–85
	Jeff Timberlake	217	1987–88
7	Ken Leary	195	1963–64
8	Jeff Timberlake	178	1986–87
9	Ken Leary	166	1964–65
10	Shawn Teague	165	1982–83

Single game
Rk	Player	Assists	Season	Opponent
1	Maurice Watson Jr.	17	2013–14	Army
2	Ken Leary	16	1963–64	Colby

== Steals ==
Career
Rk	Player	Steals	Seasons
1	John Holland	200	2007–08 2008–09 2009–10 2010–11
	LeVar Folk	200	1995–96 1996–97 1997–98 1998–99
3	Dwayne Vinson	193	1982–83 1983–84 1984–85 1985–86
4	Cedric Hankerson	141	2013–14 2014–15 2015–16 2016–17 2017–18
5	Tunji Awojobi	171	1993–94 1994–95 1995–96 1996–97
6	Shawn Teague	167	1982–83 1983–84 1984–85
7	Kevin Fitzgerald	166	2000–01 2001–02 2002–03 2003–04
8	Shaun Wynn	156	2002–03 2003–04 2004–05 2005–06
9	Jonas Harper	150	2018–19 2019–20 2020–21 2021–22 2022–23
10	D.J. Irving	145	2010–11 2011–12 2012–13 2013–14
	Jeff Timberlake	145	1985–86 1986–87 1987–88 1988–89

Season
Rk	Player	Steals	Season
1	Tony Simms	76	1982–83
2	Maurice Watson Jr.	74	2013–14
3	Dwayne Vinson	64	1983–84
4	Shaun Wynn	60	2003–04
	Shawn Teague	60	1983–84
6	Cedric Hankerson	59	2016–17
7	Carlos Strong	58	2009–10
8	Kyle Foreman	57	2016–17
	LeVar Folk	57	1998–99
10	John Holland	56	2009–10
	Shawn Teague	56	1982–83

Single game
Rk	Player	Steals	Season	Opponent
1	Cedric Hankerson	9	2014–15	American
2	Tyler Morris	8	2009–10	Morehead State
	Shaun Wynn	8	2003–04	Albany
	Mike Costello	8	1999–00	Hartford
	Brett Brown	8	1980–81	CW Post

== Blocks ==
Career
Rk	Player	Blocks	Seasons
1	Tunji Awojobi	302	1993–94 1994–95 1995–96 1996–97
2	Patrick Hazel	116	2010–11 2011–12
3	Rashad Bell	114	2001–02 2002–03 2003–04 2004–05
4	Kevin Gardner	95	2002–03 2003–04 2004–05 2005–06
5	Jason Scott	93	1989–90 1990–91 1991–92
6	Jake O’Brien	85	2008–09 2009–10 2010–11
7	Sukhmail Mathon	79	2017–18 2018–19 2019–20 2020–21 2021–22
8	Larry Jones	78	1985–86 1986–87 1987–88
9	David Stiff	75	1992–93 1993–94 1994–95
10	Ben Defty	74	2024–25 2025–26

Season
Rk	Player	Blocks	Season
1	Tunji Awojobi	87	1994–95
2	Tunji Awojobi	86	1993–94
3	Tunji Awojobi	71	1996–97
4	Patrick Hazel	64	2010–11
5	Tunji Awojobi	58	1995–96
6	Ben Defty	57	2025–26
7	Patrick Hazel	52	2011–12
8	Rashad Bell	49	2004–05
9	Omari Peterkin	44	2006–07
10	Jake O’Brien	42	2009–10
	Jason Scott	42	1990–91

Single game
Rk	Player	Blocks	Season	Opponent
1	Tunji Awojobi	8	1996–97	Drexel
	Tunji Awojobi	8	1994–95	Hartford
	Tunji Awojobi	8	1994–95	Hartford
