= List of Boston University Terriers men's basketball head coaches =

The following is a list of Boston University Terriers men's basketball head coaches. The Terriers have had 25 coaches in their 114-season history.

Boston University's current head coach is Joe Jones. He was hired in March 2017 to replace Pat Chambers, who left to take the head coach position at Penn State.

No.	Tenure	Coach	Years	Record	Pct.
–	1901–1907; 1920–1922; 1923–1924	No coach	9	8–32	.200
1	1908–1909	P. V. Stroud	1	0–2	.000
2	1909–1910	Charles McGlue	1	0–1	.000
3	1910–1911	H. L. Perrin	1	0–1	.000
4	1915–1916	Henry Crane	1	2–2	.500
5	1916–1918	V. B. Allison	2	12–5	.706
6	1919–1920	Percy Wendell	1	0–6	.000
7	1924–1925	John Williams	1	9–13	.409
8	1925–1932	Win Karlson	7	38–54	.413
9	1932–1935	John Harmon	3	15–28	.349
10	1935–1945 (Note: Boston University did not field a team for the 1943–44 season.)	Mel Collard	9	64–63	.504
11	1945–1948	Russ Peterson	3	36–18	.667
12	1948–1949	Charles Cummings	1	6–12	.333
13	1949–1952	Vin Cronin	3	23–29	.442
14	1952–1959	Matt Zunic	7	96–58	.623
15	1959–1966	John H. Burke Jr.	7	68–84	.447
16	1966–1971	Charlie Luce	5	49–70	.412
17	1971–1974	Ron Mitchell	3	31–42	.425
18	1974–1978	Roy Sigler	4	36–66	.353
19	1978–1983	Rick Pitino	5	91–51	.641
20	1983–1985	John Kuester	2	31–28	.525
21	1985–1990	Mike Jarvis	5	101–51	.664
22	1990–1994	Bob Brown	4	38–73	.342
23	1994–2009	Dennis Wolff	15	247–197	.556
24	2009–2011	Pat Chambers	2	42–28	.600
25	2011–present	Joe Jones	12	202–174	.537
Totals		25 coaches	114 seasons	1,245–1,187	.512
Records updated through end of 2022–23 season Source
