= Maine Black Bears men's basketball statistical leaders =

The Maine Black Bears men's basketball statistical leaders are individual statistical leaders of the Maine Black Bears men's basketball program in various categories, including points, rebounds, assists, steals, and blocks. Within those areas, the lists identify single-game, single-season, and career leaders. The Black Bears the University of Maine in the NCAA's America East Conference.

Maine began competing in intercollegiate basketball in 1904. However, the school's record book does not generally list records from before the 1950s, as records from before this period are often incomplete and inconsistent. Since scoring was much lower in this era, and teams played much fewer games during a typical season, it is likely that few or no players from this era would appear on these lists anyway.

The NCAA did not officially record assists as a stat until the 1983–84 season, and blocks and steals until the 1985–86 season, but Maine's record books includes players in these stats before these seasons. These lists are updated through the end of the 2021–22 season.

== Scoring ==
Career
Rk	Player	Points	Seasons
1	Rufus Harris	2,206	1976–77 1977–78 1978–79 1979–80
2	Bob Warner	1,758	1972–73 1973–74 1974–75 1975–76
3	Gerald McLemore	1,657	2008–09 2009–10 2010–11 2011–12
4	Kevin Reed	1,601	2002–03 2003–04 2004–05 2006–07
5	Francois Bouchard	1,541	1989–90 1990–91 1991–92 1992–93 1993–94
6	Casey Arena	1,531	1992–93 1993–94 1994–95 1995–96
7	Roger Lapham	1,523	1975–76 1976–77 1977–78 1978–79
8	Jim Stephenson	1,518	1966–67 1967–68 1968–69
9	Andrew Fleming	1,414	2016–17 2017–18 2018–19 2019–20
10	Skip Chappelle	1,352	1959–60 1960–61 1961–62

Season
Rk	Player	Points	Season
1	Rufus Harris	718	1979–80
2	Jim Boylen	592	1986–87
3	Rufus Harris	569	1977–78
4	Jim Stephenson	553	1967–68
5	Paul Wholly	552	1975–76
6	Jim Stephenson	548	1968–69
7	Nate Fox	544	1999–00
8	Aaron Calixte	542	2017–18
9	Dean Smith	534	1989–90
10	Champ Godbolt	525	1980–81

Single game
Rk	Player	Points	Season	Opponent
1	Jim Stephenson	54	1968–69	Colby

== Rebounds ==
Career
Rk	Player	Rebounds	Seasons
1	Bob Warner	1,304	1972–73 1973–74 1974–75 1975–76
2	Allen Ledbetter	1,017	1995–96 1996–97 1997–98 1998–99
3	Jeff Cross	894	1980–81 1981–82 1982–83 1983–84
4	Rufus Harris	806	1976–77 1977–78 1978–79 1979–80
5	Francois Bouchard	792	1989–90 1990–91 1991–92 1992–93 1993–94
6	Nick Susi	756	1969–70 1970–71 1971–72
7	Kevin Nelson	754	1975–76 1976–77 1977–78 1978–79
8	Kevin Reed	732	2002–03 2003–04 2004–05 2006–07
9	Andrew Fleming	728	2016–17 2017–18 2018–19 2019–20
10	Guy Strang	727	1963–64 1964–65 1965–66

Season
Rk	Player	Rebounds	Season
1	Bob Warner	352	1974–75
2	Bob Warner	350	1973–74
3	Jeff Cross	339	1983–84
4	Jeff Cross	310	1982–83
5	Greg Logan	300	1995–96
6	Allen Ledbetter	296	1996–97
7	Allen Ledbetter	294	1997–98
8	Hugh Campbell	293	1968–69
9	Bob Warner	292	1975–76
10	Arthur Warren	275	1961–62

Single game
Rk	Player	Rebounds	Season	Opponent
1	Bob Warner	28	1973–74	Trinity

== Assists ==
Career
Rk	Player	Assists	Seasons
1	Marty Higgins	619	1988–89 1989–90 1990–91 1991–92
2	Casey Arena	574	1992–93 1993–94 1994–95 1995–96
3	Deont Hursey	446	1990–91 1991–92 1992–93 1993–94
4	Jeff Sturgeon	427	1980–81 1981–82 1982–83 1983–84
5	Jaden Clayton	397	2022–23 2023–24 2024–25
6	Kellen Tynes	381	2022–23 2023–24 2024–25
7	Andy Bedard	374	1998–99 1999–00
8	Jim Boylen	370	1983–84 1984–85 1985–86 1986–87
9	Junior Bernal	358	2006–07 2007–08 2008–09 2009–10
10	Matt Rossignol	328	1985–86 1986–87 1987–88 1988–89

Season
Rk	Player	Assists	Season
1	Andy Bedard	193	1999–00

Single game
Rk	Player	Assists	Season	Opponent
1	Jeff Sturgeon	16	1982–83	Niagara

== Steals ==
Career
Rk	Player	Steals	Seasons
1	Kellen Tynes	275	2022–23 2023–24 2024–25
2	Marty Higgins	243	1988–89 1989–90 1990–91 1991–92
3	Casey Arena	226	1992–93 1993–94 1994–95 1995–96
4	Kevin Reed	225	2002–03 2003–04 2004–05 2006–07
5	Deont Hursey	198	1990–91 1991–92 1992–93 1993–94
6	Ramone Jones	186	1993–94 1994–95 1995–96 1996–97
7	Jim Boylen	183	1983–84 1984–85 1985–86 1986–87
	Shaun Lawton	183	2012–13 2013–14 2014–15 2015–16
9	Junior Bernal	167	2006–07 2007–08 2008–09 2009–10
10	Jaden Clayton	163	2022–23 2023–24 2024–25

Season
Rk	Player	Steals	Season
1	Kellen Tynes	107	2024–25
2	Kellen Tynes	98	2022–23
3	Marty Higgins	95	1991–92

Single game
Rk	Player	Steals	Season	Opponent
1	Marty Higgins	8	1991–92	Drexel
	Casey Arena	8	1993–94	Central Conn.
	Allen Ledbetter	8	1998–99	UNH
	Kellen Tynes	8	2022–23	Binghamton
	Kellen Tynes	8	2024–25	UMass Lowell

== Blocks ==
Career
Rk	Player	Blocks	Seasons
1	Justin Rowe	226	2001–02 2002–03
2	Jeff Cross	209	1980–81 1981–82 1982–83 1983–84
3	Olli Ahvenniemi	146	2003–04 2004–05 2005–06 2006–07
4	Ed Jones	130	1990–91 1991–92 1992–93 1993–94
5	Guy Gomis	108	1986–87 1987–88 1988–89 1989–90
6	Stephane Ingo	105	2019–20 2020–21 2021–22
7	Mark Flavin	99	2001–02 2002–03 2003–04 2004–05
8	Sean McNally	90	2007–08 2008–09 2009–10 2010–11
9	Andrew Fleming	89	2016–17 2017–18 2018–19 2019–20
10	Allen Ledbetter	68	1995–96 1996–97 1997–98 1998–99

Season
Rk	Player	Blocks	Season
1	Justin Rowe	121	2001–02
2	Justin Rowe	105	2002–03
3	Jeff Cross	80	1983–84
4	Jeff Cross	74	1982–83
5	Olli Ahvenniemi	72	2005–06

Single game
Rk	Player	Blocks	Season	Opponent
1	Justin Rowe	10	2001–02	Stony Brook
