= 1982–83 Maine Black Bears men's basketball team =

American college basketball season

1982–83 Maine Black Bears men's basketball
- Conference: American East Conference
- Record: 12–14 (6–4 ECACN)
- Head coach: Skip Chappelle (12th season)
- Home arena: Memorial Gymnasium

1982–83 ECAC North men's basketball standings
	Conf.				Overall
Team	W		L	PCT	W		L	PCT
Boston University †	8	–	2	.800	21	–	10	.677
New Hampshire	8	–	2	.800	16	–	12	.571
Holy Cross	5	–	3	.625	17	–	13	.567
Maine	6	–	4	.600	12	–	14	.462
Niagara	5	–	4	.556	11	–	18	.379
Northeastern	4	–	6	.400	13	–	15	.464
Canisius	3	–	6	.333	11	–	17	.393
Vermont	3	–	7	.300	10	–	19	.345
Colgate	0	–	8	.000	3	–	24	.111
† 1983 ECAC North tournament winner

The 1982–83 Maine Black Bears men's basketball team represented University of Maine in the 1982–83 NCAA Division I men's basketball season. The Black Bears, led by twelfth-year head coach Skip Chappelle, played their home games at Memorial Gymnasium and were members of the America East Conference. Jeff Cross was named the conference player of the year. The Black Bears finished the regular season with a record of 12–14, 6–4 in their conference.

== Roster ==
1982–83 Maine Black Bears men's basketball team
Players
Coaches

Pos.	#	Name	Height	Weight	Year	Hometown
C	52	Chip Bunker	6 ft 11 in (2.11 m)	220 lb (100 kg)	Fr	Quincy, Massachusetts
F	40	Paul Cook	6 ft 6 in (1.98 m)	198 lb (90 kg)	Jr	Lubec, Maine
G	12	Dan Costigan	6 ft 1 in (1.85 m)	178 lb (81 kg)	Fr	Portland, Maine
C	54	Jeff Cross	6 ft 10 in (2.08 m)	240 lb (109 kg)	Jr	Worcester, Massachusetts
G	24	Kevin Green	6 ft 3 in (1.91 m)	192 lb (87 kg)	Jr	Natick, Massachusetts
F	34	Clay Pickering	6 ft 5 in (1.96 m)	212 lb (96 kg)	Sr	Akron, Ohio
F	44	John Sims	6 ft 5 in (1.96 m)	215 lb (98 kg)	Fr	Weston, Massachusetts
G/F	42	Jeff Sturgeon	6 ft 4 in (1.93 m)	204 lb (93 kg)	Jr	Old Town, Maine
F	30	Jeff Topliff	6 ft 4 in (1.93 m)	199 lb (90 kg)	So	Veazie, Maine
G	32	Jeff Wheeler	6 ft 3 in (1.91 m)	206 lb (93 kg)	So	Enfield, Connecticut
C	50	Matt Zalauskas	6 ft 9 in (2.06 m)	215 lb (98 kg)	Fr	Spencer, Massachusetts

Head coach

- Skip Chappelle

Assistant coach(es)

- Peter Gavett
- Jim Hutnik

Legend

- (C) Team captain
- (S) Suspended
- (I) Ineligible
- (W) Walk-on
- Injured
- Current redshirt

== Schedule ==
Date time, TV	Rank^{#}	Opponent^{#}	Result	Record	Site city, state
November 30*		Southern Maine	W 53–42	1–0	Memorial Gymnasium; Orono, Maine
December 4*		at Drexel	L 53–59	1–1	Daskalakis Athletic Center; Philadelphia, Pennsylvania
December 6*		at Fairleigh Dickinson	L 61–80	1–2	FDU Gym; Hackensack, NJ
December 8*		vs. James Madison	L 53–58	1–3	
December 11*		Brooklyn	L 42–43	1–4	Memorial Gymnasium; Orono, Maine
December 23*		at Iona	L 67–78	1–5	Hynes Athletics Center
December 28*		vs. Fairfield	W 95–84	2–5	
January 5		Niagara	W 79–73	3–5 (1–0)	Memorial Gymnasium; Orono, Maine
January 6*		Ursinus	W 81–64	4–5 (1–0)	Memorial Gymnasium; Orono, Maine
January 8		Northeastern	L 57–79	4–6 (1–1)	Memorial Gymnasium; Orono, Maine
January 11*		at James Madison	L 59–84	4–7 (1–1)	JMU Convocation Center; Harrisonburg, Virginia
January 15*		at Kansas	L 68–79	4–8 (1–1)	Allen Fieldhouse; Lawrence, Kansas
January 21		at Vermont	W 80–59	5–8 (2–1)	Roy L. Patrick Gymnasium; Burlington, Vermont
January 22		at Vermont	W 62–56	6–8 (3–1)	Roy L. Patrick Gymnasium; Burlington, Vermont
January 26*		at St. Michael's	W 84–79	7–8 (3–1)	
January 29*		at George Mason	W 91–78	8–8 (3–1)	GMU Field House; Fairfax, Virginia
February 3		at Holy Cross	L 78–85 ^{OT}	8–9 (3–2)	Hart Recreation Center; Worcester, Massachusetts
February 5*		at Brooklyn	W 56–49	9–9 (3–2)	Roosevelt Gymnasium; Brooklyn, NY
February 7		Boston University	L 52–57	9–10 (3–3)	Memorial Gymnasium; Orono, Maine
February 9*		at Utica	L 60–70	9–11 (3–3)	Clark Athletic Center
February 12		at Colgate	W 51–38	10–11 (4–3)	Cotterell Court; Hamilton, NY
February 14		at Boston University	L 70–82	10–12 (4–4)	Case Gym; Boston, Massachusetts
February 17		Canisius	W 83–68	11–12 (5–4)	Memorial Gymnasium; Orono, Maine
February 19		New Hampshire	W 59–58	12–12 (6–4)	Memorial Gymnasium; Orono, Maine
February 23*		Iona	L 54–56	12–13 (6–4)	Memorial Gymnasium; Orono, Maine
Eastern Collegiate Athletic Conference North tournament
March 8		vs. Niagara	L 76–78 ^{2OT}	12–14 (6–4)	Memorial Gymnasium; Orono, Maine
*Non-conference game. ^{#}Rankings from AP Poll. (#) Tournament seedings in parentheses.

== Players selected in NBA drafts ==
Year	Round	Pick	Player	NBA club
1984	3	61	Jeff Cross	Dallas Mavericks
