= Drederick Irving =

American basketball player (born 1966)

Personal information
- Born: January 11, 1966 (age 60) The Bronx, New York, U.S.
- Listed height: 6 ft 4 in (1.93 m)
- Listed weight: 170 lb (77 kg)

Career information
- High school: Adlai E. Stevenson High School (The Bronx, New York) (1980-1984)
- College: Boston University (1984–1988)
- Playing career: 1984–1993
- Position: Shooting Guard
- Number: 11

Career highlights
- Lou Cohen MVP Award (1988); 2× First-team All-ECACN (1986, 1988); Second-team All-ECACN (1987); ECACN All-Freshman Team (1985)

Drederick Irving (born January 11, 1966) is an American former professional basketball player. He played college basketball at Boston University from 1984 to 1988. He is the father of National Basketball Association (NBA) player Kyrie Irving.

== Basketball career ==
=== High school ===
Irving was raised in public housing in the Bronx. He practiced gymnastics before switching to basketball at age ten. He played on the varsity basketball team at Adlai E. Stevenson High School. He spent his junior year as a reserve player and committed to Boston University in the fall of his senior year. In his senior season, as a starter, he set a single-season record with 521 points and was all-city and all-division.

=== College ===
In his sophomore, junior & senior years, Irving led the Boston University Terriers with 18, 18.8 & 19.9 points per game respectively. In his senior year, while second in the Eastern College Athletic Conference-North with 20.3 points per game, he became BU's all-time leading scorer on February 5, 1988. The Terriers won the North Atlantic Conference tournament to receive an automatic bid to the NCAA tournament, where they lost to No. 2 Duke in the opening round.

BU retired his No. 11 jersey in 1988 and inducted him into the BU Athletic Hall of Fame. His 1,931 career points now rank third in program history.

=== Professional ===
In 1992, Irving moved to Australia to play for the Bulleen Boomers of the South East Australian Basketball League, where he averaged 30 points per game. He also unsuccessfully tried out for the Boston Celtics of the NBA and played in the Pro-Am League in New York.

== Career statistics ==
=== College ===
Year	Team	GP	GS	MPG	FG%	3P%	FT%	RPG	APG	SPG	BPG	PPG
1984–85	Boston University	30	7	18.6	.404	-	.684	1.4	0.9	0.8	0.0	6.4
1985-86	Boston University	31	31	33.9	.488	-	.791	2.8	2.1	1.2	0.0	18.0
1986-87	Boston University	30	30	31.3	.466	.407	.740	3.2	2.3	1.2	.0	18.8
1987-88	Boston University	31	-	-	.482	.432	.756	3.4	2.8	1.2	0.2	19.9
Career		122	68	28.0	.469	.422	.754	2.7	2.0	1.1	.1	15.8

== Personal life ==
Irving met his first wife, Elizabeth Larson, while in college. They married and moved to the Seattle area, where Irving worked as a credit manager for a finance company. Their son, Kyrie, was born in Australia while Irving was playing professional basketball. Irving's childhood friend Rod Strickland, who played in the NBA, is Kyrie's godfather. Elizabeth died when Kyrie was four years old. Irving raised Kyrie and daughter Asia in New Jersey and worked as a financial broker on Wall Street. He married Shetellia Riley, who would become Kyrie's agent, in 2004 and had another daughter, London.

Irving was signed by his son to his Anta signature shoe line. This is the first time an athlete has signed their dad to a shoe deal.
