= Michael Jarvis (disambiguation) =

Michael Jarvis (1938-2011) was a race horse trainer.

Michael Jarvis may also refer to:

- Mike Jarvis (born 1945), basketball coach
- Mike Jarvis (The Bill)
