= Hellweg (disambiguation) =

Hellweg is an ancient east–west route through Germany.

Hellweg may also refer to:

- Hellweg Railway, Germany
- Hellweg Börde, Germany

== People with the surname ==
- Eric Hellweg, American executive editor of Harvard Business Review online
- John H. Hellweg (1844-1931), American businessman and politician
