= Nulsen =

Nulsen, Nülsen or Nuelsen may refer to:

== People ==
- Emil Nulsen (1885–1965), Australian politician
- John Louis Nuelsen (1867–1946), German-American bishop

== Other ==
- Nulsen, Western Australia, a western suburb of Esperance
