= Mel Collard =

American football, basketball, and baseball coach (1894–1971

Biographical details
- Born: July 17, 1894; Enfield, Illinois, U.S.
- Died: March 16, 1971 (aged 76); Fort Myers, Florida, U.S.
- Education: Missouri Wesleyan College

Coaching career (HC unless noted)

Basketball
- 1921–1922: Fairfield Community HS (IL)
- 1923–1926: Central Wesleyan
- 1927–1932: Ozark Wesleyan
- 1932–1933: Carthage HS (MO)
- 1934–1935: Boston University (assistant)
- 1935–1945: Boston University

Football
- 1921: Fairfield Community HS (IL)
- 1923–1925: Central Wesleyan
- 1927–1931: Ozark Wesleyan
- 1932: Carthage HS (MO)

Baseball
- 1935: Boston University (freshmen)
- 1936–1942: Boston University
- 1946–1950: Boston University

Merrel A. "Mel" Collard (July 17, 1894 – March 16, 1971), often misspelled as Merrell or Merrill, was an American athlete and coach who coached various sports at Missouri Wesleyan College, Ozark Wesleyan College, and Boston University.

== Biography ==
During World War I, Collard was a first sergeant in the 124th Field Artillery Regiment of the 33rd Infantry Division, American Expeditionary Forces, serving under Col. Horatio B. Hackett. He graduated from Missouri Wesleyan College in Cameron, Missouri in 1921. He and his brother, Vernon, operated a confectionary shop, The Fair Sex, in Cameron.

Collard was a science teacher and coach at Fairfield Community High School, in Fairfield, Illinois during the 1921–22 school year. In 1923, he became the coach and physical director for men at Central Wesleyan College, succeeding John Harmon, who went to the University of Evansville. After spending a year out of coaching selling automobiles in Carmi, Illinois, Collard became the football, basketball, tennis, and track coach at Ozark Wesleyan College. He was the coach and athletic director at Carthage High School in Carthage, Missouri during the 1932–33 academic year, but his contract was not renewed.

In 1934, Collard attended Boston University's school of physical education on a fellowship. On October 29, 1934, athletic director John Harmon named Collard the head freshman and assistant varsity basketball coach. In 1935, he was appointed freshman baseball coach. Harmon gave up his coaching duties later that year and Collard was named varsity baseball and freshman football coach. The previous freshman football coach, Edgar Manske, was named varsity basketball coach, however, he left the school soon thereafter to sign a National Football League contract. Collard was then chosen to coach the varsity basketball team and Oliver Olsen was appointed freshman football coach.

Collard was head coach of the Boston University Terriers men's basketball team from 1935 to 1945 and compiled a 64–63 record. He continued to coach baseball until 1950, when he resigned to focus on his teaching duties.

Collard died suddenly, on March 16, 1971, while playing golf in Fort Myers, Florida. He was survived by his wife and two children. At the time of his death, Collard was a resident of Wellesley, Massachusetts.

== Head coaching record ==
=== College football ===
Year	Team	Overall	Conference	Standing	Bowl/playoffs
Central Wesleyan (Missouri Intercollegiate Athletic Association) (1923)
1923	Central Wesleyan	2–4–1	0–1–1	14th	
Central Wesleyan (Independent) (1924)
1924	Central Wesleyan	6–2			
Central Wesleyan (Missouri College Athletic Union) (1925–1926)
1925	Central Wesleyan	4–3	1–2	7th	
1926	Central Wesleyan	2–5–1	0–5–1	9th	
Central Wesleyan:		14–14–2	1–8–2		
Total:					
