= 1989–90 Boston University Terriers men's basketball team =

American college basketball season

1989–90 Boston University Terriers men's basketball

NAC Regular season co-champions NAC tournament champions

NCAA tournament
- Conference: North Atlantic Conference
- Record: 18–12 (9–3 NAC)
- Head coach: Mike Jarvis (5th season)
- Captain: Steven Key
- Home arena: Case Gym

1989–90 North Atlantic Conference men's basketball standings
	Conf.				Overall
Team	W		L	PCT	W		L	PCT
Northeastern	9	–	3	.750	16	–	12	.571
Boston University †	9	–	3	.750	18	–	12	.600
Hartford	8	–	4	.667	17	–	11	.607
Maine	6	–	6	.500	11	–	17	.393
Vermont	4	–	8	.333	13	–	17	.433
Colgate	3	–	9	.250	8	–	21	.276
New Hampshire	3	–	9	.250	5	–	23	.179
† 1990 NAC tournament winner Rankings from AP Poll

The 1989–90 Boston University Terriers men's basketball team represented Boston University during the 1989–90 NCAA Division I men's basketball season. The Terriers, led by fifth year head coach Mike Jarvis, played their home games at Case Gym and were members of the North Atlantic Conference. They finished the season 18–12, 9–3 in NAC play to finish in a tie for the regular season conference title. The Terriers won the NAC tournament to receive an automatic bid to the NCAA tournament as No. 16 seed in the East region. Boston University was defeated by top seed Connecticut in the opening round, 76–52.

== Roster ==
1989–90 Boston University Terriers men's basketball team
Players
Coaches

Pos.	#	Name	Height	Weight	Year	Hometown
C	00	Ron Moses	6 ft 8 in (2.03 m)	255 lb (116 kg)	Sr	Lynchburg, South Carolina
G	15	Steven Key (C)	6 ft 4 in (1.93 m)	—	Sr	Columbia, Maryland
F		Bill Brigham	6 ft 7 in (2.01 m)	—	Sr

Head coach

- Mike Jarvis (Northeastern)

Assistant coach(es)

Legend

- (C) Team captain
- (S) Suspended
- (I) Ineligible
- (W) Walk-on
- Injured
- Current redshirt

== Schedule and results ==
Date time, TV	Rank^{#}	Opponent^{#}	Result	Record	Site (attendance) city, state
Regular season
Nov 25, 1989*		Indiana State	W 73–60	1–0	Case Gym; Boston, Massachusetts
Nov 27, 1989*		No. 10 Michigan	L 65–73	1–1	Boston Garden (10,032); Boston, Massachusetts
Nov 29, 1989*		at Fairleigh Dickinson	L 76–77 ^{OT}	1–2	Rothman Center; Hackensack, New Jersey
Dec 2, 1989*		UMass	L 60–76	1–3	Case Gym; Boston, Massachusetts
Dec 8, 1989*		vs. East Tennessee State; Forest Industries Classic	W 78–73	2–3	Harry Adams Field House; Missoula, Montana
Dec 9, 1989*		at Montana; Forest Industries Classic	L 64–73	2–4	Harry Adams Field House; Missoula, Montana
Dec 23, 1989*		at UC Santa Barbara	L 68–89	2–5	The Thunderdome; Santa Barbara, California
Dec 27, 1989*		vs. No. 23 Oregon State; Far West Classic	L 66–86	2–6	Portland, Oregon
Dec 28, 1989*		vs. Pepperdine; Far West Classic	W 64–61	3–6	Portland, Oregon
Dec 29, 1989*		vs. UNC Charlotte; Far West Classic	L 83–88 ^{2OT}	3–7	Portland, Oregon
Jan 4, 1990*		at Drexel	W 80–62	4–7	Daskalakis Athletic Center; Philadelphia, Pennsylvania
Jan 6, 1990		at Vermont	W 71–67	5–7 (1–0)	Roy L. Patrick Gymnasium; Burlington, Vermont
Jan 10, 1990*		at No. 17 NC State	L 70–95	5–8	Reynolds Coliseum; Raleigh, North Carolina
Jan 17, 1990		at Colgate	W 68–60	6–8 (2–0)	Cotterell Court; Hamilton, New York
Jan 20, 1990*		Maryland	W 65–61	7–8	Boston Garden; Boston, Massachusetts
Jan 27, 1990		at New Hampshire	W 67–51	8–8 (3–0)	Lundholm Gym; Durham, New Hampshire
Jan 31, 1990		at Hartford	L 54–55	8–9 (3–1)	Hartford Civic Center; Hartford, Connecticut
Feb 3, 1990		Vermont	W 80–66	9–9 (4–1)	Case Gym; Boston, Massachusetts
Feb 7, 1990		Hartford	W 82–67	10–9 (5–1)	Case Gym; Boston, Massachusetts
Feb 10, 1990		Northeastern	W 82–80	11–9 (6–1)	Case Gym; Boston, Massachusetts
Feb 14, 1990*		Maryland-Baltimore County	W 85–72	12–9	Case Gym; Boston, Massachusetts
Feb 17, 1990		Colgate	W 86–82	13–9 (7–1)	Case Gym; Boston, Massachusetts
Feb 21, 1990*		Maine	L 70–73	13–10 (7–2)	Case Gym; Boston, Massachusetts
Feb 25, 1990		at Maine	W 69–63	14–10 (8–2)	Alfond Arena; Orono, Maine
Feb 28, 1990		New Hampshire	W 85–77	15–10 (9–2)	Case Gym; Boston, Massachusetts
Mar 3, 1990		at Northeastern	L 83–93	15–11 (9–3)	Matthews Arena; Boston, Massachusetts
NAC tournament
Mar 6, 1990*	(2)	vs. (7) New Hampshire; NAC Tournament Semifinal	W 63–56	16–11	Hartford Civic Center; Hartford, Connecticut
Mar 7, 1990*	(2)	vs. (6) Colgate; NAC Tournament Semifinal	W 85–63	17–11	Hartford Civic Center; Hartford, Connecticut
Mar 8, 1990*	(2)	vs. (5) Vermont; NAC tournament championship	W 75–57	18–11	Hartford Civic Center; Hartford, Connecticut
NCAA tournament
Mar 15, 1990*	(16 E)	vs. (1 E) No. 4 Connecticut; First Round	L 52–76	18–12	Hartford Civic Center; Hartford, Connecticut
*Non-conference game. ^{#}Rankings from AP poll. (#) Tournament seedings in parentheses. E=East. All times are in Eastern Time.
