= 1983 ECAC North men's basketball tournament =

- Classification: Division I
- Season: 1982–83
- Teams: 9
- Site: Campus sites
- Champions: Boston University (1st title)
- Winning coach: Rick Pitino (1st title)
- MVP: Mike Alexander (Boston University)
- ECAC North men's basketball tournaments

1982–83 ECAC North men's basketball standings
	Conf.				Overall
Team	W		L	PCT	W		L	PCT
Boston University †	8	–	2	.800	21	–	10	.677
New Hampshire	8	–	2	.800	16	–	12	.571
Holy Cross	5	–	3	.625	17	–	13	.567
Maine	6	–	4	.600	12	–	14	.462
Niagara	5	–	4	.556	11	–	18	.379
Northeastern	4	–	6	.400	13	–	15	.464
Canisius	3	–	6	.333	11	–	17	.393
Vermont	3	–	7	.300	10	–	19	.345
Colgate	0	–	8	.000	3	–	24	.111
† 1983 ECAC North tournament winner

The 1983 ECAC North men's basketball tournament was the postseason men's basketball tournament of the ECAC North during the 1982–83 NCAA Division I men's basketball season. Games were played at campus sites.

Boston University won the tournament, defeating Holy Cross in the championship game, and received the ECAC North's automatic bid to the NCAA tournament. Mike Alexander of Boston University was named the tournament's most valuable player.

== Format ==
All nine of the conference's members participated in the tournament field. They were seeded based on regular season conference records. Games were played at the higher seed's home arena.

== Bracket and results ==
First round
8	Vermont	62
9	Colgate	61

Second round
1	Boston University	80
8	Vermont	75
4	Maine	76
5	Niagara	78**
2	New Hampshire	75
7	Canisius	64
3	Holy Cross	65
6	Northeastern	61

Semifinals
1	Boston University	95
5	Niagara	82
2	New Hampshire	77
3	Holy Cross	89

Finals
1	Boston University	63
3	Holy Cross	62

* - denotes overtime period

== See also ==
- America East Conference
