= 1990 North Atlantic Conference men's basketball tournament =

- Classification: Division I
- Season: 1989–90
- Teams: 7
- Site: Hartford Civic Center; Hartford, Connecticut
- Champions: Boston University (3rd title)
- Winning coach: Mike Jarvis (2nd title)
- MVP: Bill Brigham (Boston University)
- North Atlantic Conference men's basketball tournaments

1989–90 North Atlantic Conference men's basketball standings
	Conf.				Overall
Team	W		L	PCT	W		L	PCT
Northeastern	9	–	3	.750	16	–	12	.571
Boston University †	9	–	3	.750	18	–	12	.600
Hartford	8	–	4	.667	17	–	11	.607
Maine	6	–	6	.500	11	–	17	.393
Vermont	4	–	8	.333	13	–	17	.433
Colgate	3	–	9	.250	8	–	21	.276
New Hampshire	3	–	9	.250	5	–	23	.179
† 1990 NAC tournament winner Rankings from AP Poll

The 1990 North Atlantic Conference men's basketball tournament was hosted by the Hartford Hawks at the Hartford Civic Center. Boston University gained its third overall North Atlantic Conference Championship and an automatic berth to the NCAA tournament with its win over Vermont. Boston University was given the 16th seed in the East Regional of the NCAA Tournament and lost in the first round to Connecticut 76–52.

== Bracket and Results ==
Quarterfinals
4	Maine	75
5	Vermont	78
3	Hartford	53
6	Colgate	54
2	Boston University	63
7	New Hampshire	56

Semifinals
1	Northeastern	62
5	Vermont	76
6	Colgate	63
2	Boston University	85

Finals
5	Vermont	57
2	Boston University	75

== See also ==
- America East Conference
