= Win Karlson =

American athlete and coach

Biographical details
- Born: October 3, 1891
- Died: January 14, 1972 (aged 80); Boston, Massachusetts, U.S.

Playing career

Baseball
- 1920: Syracuse Stars

Coaching career (HC unless noted)

Men's basketball
- 1924–1925: Wentworth
- 1925–1932: Boston University

Baseball
- 1925–1929: Wentworth

Head coaching record
- Overall: 39–53 (.424)

Winslow Karlson (October 3, 1891 – January 14, 1972) was an American athlete and coach who was the head coach of the Boston University Terriers men's basketball team from 1925 to 1932.

== Baseball ==
During his youth, Karlson attended Boston Braves games at the South End Grounds by volunteering to clean the stands and roll the field. When he turned fifteen, he was hired by the Braves to work the turnstiles. In 1906, he began working at the Huntington Avenue Grounds, home of the Boston Red Sox. He followed the team to Fenway Park in 1912, but returned to the Braves in 1915 when Braves Field opened. In 1917, the Pittsburgh Pirates, who were impressed with Karlson after he threw batting practice for the team, signed him to a contract and sent him to the Asheville Tourists. However, shortly after joining the team, Karlson joined the United States Army and served in France during World War I. Karlson resumed playing baseball after the war. In 1920, he pitched in 17 games for the Syracuse Stars of the International League and went 1–10 with a 4.83 earned run average. After his playing career ended, Karlson spent five seasons as the head baseball coach at the Wentworth Institute.

== Basketball ==
Karlson was also a standout basketball player who was described by The Boston Globe as "one of the best centers in Greater Boston". He played for a number of New England teams, including the Fenno five, St. Alphonsus, Cohasset A. A., the Wyanokos of Hartford, Maynard, and the Shawmuts of Roxbury. During the 1924–25 season, he was the basketball coach at the Wentworth Institute. The following season, he took over as head coach at Boston University. He coached there for seven seasons and compiled a record of 39–53.

== Later life ==
Karlson was replaced as BU's basketball coach by John Harmon in 1932, but remained with the school for one more year as custodian of athletic equipment. He held various jobs for the Braves and Red Sox, working as an usher at Fenway Park until he was eighty. He died on January 14, 1972, at the Veterans' Administration Hospital in Jamaica Plain.
