= 1982–83 Boston University Terriers men's basketball team =

American college basketball season

1982–83 Boston University Terriers men's basketball

ECAC North Regular season co-champions ECAC North tournament champions

NCAA tournament
- Conference: East Coast Athletic Conference
- Record: 21–10 (8–2 ECAC North)
- Head coach: Rick Pitino (5th season)
- Home arena: Case Gym

1982–83 ECAC North men's basketball standings
	Conf.				Overall
Team	W		L	PCT	W		L	PCT
Boston University †	8	–	2	.800	21	–	10	.677
New Hampshire	8	–	2	.800	16	–	12	.571
Holy Cross	5	–	3	.625	17	–	13	.567
Maine	6	–	4	.600	12	–	14	.462
Niagara	5	–	4	.556	11	–	18	.379
Northeastern	4	–	6	.400	13	–	15	.464
Canisius	3	–	6	.333	11	–	17	.393
Vermont	3	–	7	.300	10	–	19	.345
Colgate	0	–	8	.000	3	–	24	.111
† 1983 ECAC North tournament winner

The 1982–83 Boston University Terriers men's basketball team represented Boston University during the 1982–83 NCAA Division I men's basketball season. The Terriers, led by fifth year head coach Rick Pitino, played their home games at Case Gym and were members of the East Coast Athletic Conference. They finished the season 21–10, 8–2 in ECAC North play to finish in a tie for the regular season conference title. The Terriers won the ECAC North tournament to receive an automatic bid to the NCAA tournament as one of two No. 12 seeds in the East region. Boston University was defeated by La Salle in the play-in round, 70–58.

== Roster ==
1982–83 Boston University Terriers men's basketball team
Players
Coaches

Pos.	#	Name	Height	Weight	Year	Hometown
G		Tony Simms	6 ft 5 in (1.96 m)	—
F		Gary Plummer	6 ft 9 in (2.06 m)	210 lb (95 kg)	Jr	Detroit, Michigan

Head coach

- Rick Pitino (UMass)

Assistant coach(es)

Legend

- (C) Team captain
- (S) Suspended
- (I) Ineligible
- (W) Walk-on
- Injured
- Current redshirt

== Schedule and results ==
Date time, TV	Rank^{#}	Opponent^{#}	Result	Record	Site (attendance) city, state
Regular season
Nov 29, 1982*		Purdue	L 69–79	0–1	Case Gym; Boston, Massachusetts
Dec 3, 1982*		vs. Princeton	L 69–70	0–2	Carrier Dome; Syracuse, New York
Dec 4, 1982*		vs. Alcorn State	L 72–74	0–3	Carrier Dome; Syracuse, New York
Dec 7, 1982*		Siena	W 78–65	1–3	Case Gym
Dec 11, 1982*		Connecticut	L 50–51	1–4	Case Gym
Dec 23, 1982*		at St. Francis (NY)	W 80–64	2–4	Pope Physical Education Center; Brooklyn, New York
ECAC North tournament
Mar 10, 1983*		Vermont	W 80–75	19–9	Case Gym
Mar 11, 1983*		Niagara	W 95–82	20–9	Case Gym
Mar 12, 1983*		Holy Cross	W 63–62	21–9	Matthews Arena
NCAA tournament
Mar 15, 1983*	(12 E)	vs. (12 E) La Salle; Play-in game	L 58–70	21–10	The Palestra; Philadelphia, Pennsylvania
*Non-conference game. ^{#}Rankings from AP poll. (#) Tournament seedings in parentheses. E=East. All times are in Eastern Time.
