= 1987–88 Siena Saints men's basketball team =

American college basketball season

1987–88 Siena Saints men's basketball

ECACN regular season champions

NIT, First round
- Conference: ECAC North
- Record: 23–6 (16–2 ECACN)
- Head coach: Mike Deane (2nd season)
- Home arena: Alumni Recreation Center

1987–88 North Atlantic Conference men's basketball standings
	Conf.				Overall
Team	W		L	PCT	W		L	PCT
Siena	16	–	2	.889	23	–	6	.793
Boston University †	14	–	4	.778	23	–	8	.742
Hartford	12	–	6	.667	15	–	16	.484
Niagara	12	–	6	.667	15	–	15	.500
Northeastern	11	–	7	.611	15	–	13	.536
Maine	10	–	8	.556	13	–	15	.464
Canisius	7	–	11	.389	7	–	20	.259
New Hampshire	3	–	15	.167	4	–	25	.138
Colgate	3	–	15	.167	4	–	23	.148
Vermont	2	–	16	.111	3	–	24	.111
† 1988 North Atlantic tournament winner Rankings from AP Poll

The 1987–88 Siena Saints men's basketball team represented Siena College in the 1987–88 college basketball season. This was head coach Mike Deane's second season at Siena. The Saints competed in the ECAC North and played their home games at Alumni Recreation Center. They finished the season 23–6, 16–2 in NAC play to capture the regular season championship. As the No. 1 seed, they were upset in the quarterfinals of the ECAC North tournament by New Hampshire. As a conference champion and No. 1 seed who failed to win their conference tournament, they received a bid to the National Invitation Tournament where they lost to Boston College in the first round.

== Schedule and results ==
- All times are Eastern

Date time, TV	Rank^{#}	Opponent^{#}	Result	Record	Site (attendance) city, state
Regular season
Nov 27, 1987*		at Fairleigh Dickinson	L 69–77	0–1	Rothman Center; Hackensack, New Jersey
Nov 30, 1987*		at Wake Forest	W 72–67	1–1	Winston-Salem War Memorial Coliseum; Winston-Salem, North Carolina
Dec 5, 1987*		Le Moyne	W 75–70	2–1	Alumni Recreation Center; Loudonville, New York
Dec 9, 1987*		Fairfield	W 91–77	3–1	Alumni Recreation Center; Loudonville, New York
Dec 12, 1987*		at Marist	W 87–66	4–1	McCann Arena; Poughkeepsie, New York
Dec 28, 1987		Vermont	W 113–74	5–1 (1–0)	Alumni Recreation Center; Loudonville, New York
Dec 29, 1987*		Bowling Green	W 73–52	6–1	Alumni Recreation Center; Loudonville, New York
Jan 2, 1988*		at No. 7 Syracuse	L 72–123	6–2	Carrier Dome; Syracuse, New York
Jan 6, 1988		Maine	W 93–76	7–2 (2–0)	Alumni Recreation Center; Loudonville, New York
Jan 9, 1988		at Northeastern	W 90–75	8–2 (3–0)	Matthews Arena; Boston, Massachusetts
Jan 13, 1988		at Vermont	W 66–65	9–2 (4–0)	Patrick Gym; Burlington, Vermont
Jan 16, 1988		Colgate	W 94–50	10–2 (5–0)	Alumni Recreation Center; Loudonville, New York
Jan 20, 1988		Northeastern	W 86–72	11–2 (6–0)	Alumni Recreation Center; Loudonville, New York
Jan 23, 1988		at Maine	W 94–74	12–2 (7–0)	Memorial Gym; Orono, Maine
Jan 26, 1988		at Boston University	L 68–90	12–3 (7–1)	Walter Brown Arena; Boston, Massachusetts
Jan 30, 1988		Hartford	W 83–64	13–3 (8–1)	Alumni Recreation Center; Loudonville, New York
Feb 3, 1988		Boston University	W 89–84	14–3 (9–1)	Alumni Recreation Center; Loudonville, New York
Feb 6, 1988*		Brooklyn College	W 93–68	15–3	Alumni Recreation Center; Loudonville, New York
Feb 9, 1988		at Niagara	W 91–68	16–3 (10–1)	Buffalo Memorial Auditorium; Buffalo, New York
Feb 13, 1988		Niagara	W 90–76	17–3 (11–1)	Alumni Recreation Center; Loudonville, New York
Feb 17, 1988		New Hampshire	W 90–66	18–3 (12–1)	Alumni Recreation Center; Loudonville, New York
Feb 19, 1988		at Hartford	L 63–80	18–4 (12–2)	Hartford Civic Center; Hartford, Connecticut
Feb 21, 1988*		at Central Connecticut State	W 84–79	19–4	William H. Detrick Gymnasium; New Britain, Connecticut
Feb 24, 1988		at Canisius	W 85–70	20–4 (13–2)	Buffalo Memorial Auditorium; Buffalo, New York
Feb 27, 1988		at New Hampshire	W 98–81	21–4 (14–2)	Lundholm Gym; Durham, New Hampshire
Mar 2, 1988		Canisius	W 65–52	22–4 (15–2)	Alumni Recreation Center; Loudonville, New York
Mar 5, 1988		at Colgate	W 81–74	23–4 (16–2)	Cotterell Court; Hamilton, New York
ECACN tournament
Mar 9, 1988*	(1)	vs. (8) New Hampshire; Quarterfinals	L 63–70	23–5	Hartford Civic Center; Hartford, Connecticut
NIT
Mar 17, 1988*		at Boston College; First round	L 65–73	23–6	Roberts Center; Chestnut Hill, Massachusetts
*Non-conference game. ^{#}Rankings from AP Poll. (#) Tournament seedings in parentheses.
