= Herb Hake =

American cartoonist

Herbert V. Hake
- Born: August 10, 1903; Hoyleton, Illinois
- Died: March 10, 1980 (aged 76)
- Occupation: Cartoonist

Herb Hake (1903–1980) was an American writer, cartoonist, radio, and television personality; associated with the University of Northern Iowa. He was awarded an honorary doctoral degree.

== Biography ==
Herbert V. Hake, son of Henry and Louisa Hake, was born August 10, 1903, in Hoyleton, Illinois. His father was a painting contractor and a school board member who had some drawing skills. He nurtured Herb's strong interest in art. In the late 1920s, Herb studied at Central Wesleyan College in Warrenton, Missouri, earning a bachelor's degree in 1928. He worked at various occupations including layout work for World Color Printing in St. Louis, and writing movie reviews for the St. Louis Times.

After a year in St. Louis, he returned to his home county, took a teaching certification examination, and taught in a rural school for a year. He then did graduate work at Northwestern University in Illinois and joined the faculty at Central Wesleyan, where he taught 3 years. He then went to graduate school at the University of Missouri and later the University of Iowa, in Iowa City, Iowa where he earned his master's degree in scenic design in 1933. He then taught drama in the high school at Port Arthur, Texas. In the summer of 1936, he landed a job at the University of Missouri in Columbia with the theater department. From 1938 to 1942 he served as technical director, scenic designer and instructor of speech courses at the Iowa State Teachers College, in Cedar Falls, Iowa. He and one other teacher ran the drama department.

During World War II, the number of students at the college fell drastically. In 1942, the drama department was cut back by one, and Hake was asked to take over the radio business at the college or lose his job altogether. With very little experience or equipment, and a technical manual in hand, he started his new career. By the late 1950s he was learning television. During Hake's 34 years at the school, now the University of Northern Iowa, the radio and television facilities grew to include an FM radio station, a student-operated campus radio station, open and closed-circuit television programs and thousands of dollars' worth of equipment. He retired in 1972 and was inducted into the Iowa Broadcasters Hall of Fame. In his honor, the call letters of one of the university's radio stations was changed to KHKE.

Hake directed and hosted several radio and TV programs, Story Hour, Ask the Scientist, Landmarks in Iowa History and History with Herb Hake. He was a 'chalk talker', telling the story while drawing on the chalk board. He wrote articles and books on stagecraft, and authored Iowa Inside Out (1968); Cartoon History of Iowa (1968); Bicentennial Outlines of Cedar Falls (1974), a coloring book; and 101 Stories of Cedar Falls (1977), which is a collection of his Pioneers, Prophets and Professors column which appeared in the Record, the Cedar Falls newspaper, in the early 1970s. Profits from this book aided the Cedar Falls Historical Society in its drive to turn the old ice house into a museum. Hake was president of the society from 1972 to 1974 and served on its board as well as that of the State Historical Society of Iowa.

In retirement Hake interviewed long-time residents of Cedar Falls and recorded their thoughts on tape, to be kept for reference at the society. He used print, chalk, electronic journalism and personal appearances to effectively educate the public to appreciate Iowa's heritage. His contributions to the Cedar Falls Historical Society remain treasured.

Herbert V. Hake married his wife Monabelle on June 4, 1930, in Fayette, Missouri. They had two daughters, Patty and Priscilla. He died of cancer on March 10, 1980 at the age of 76. His papers are archived at Rod Library at the University of Northern Iowa.

== Writings by Hake ==
- Here's How! A Guide to Economy in Stagecraft (1942)
- Iowa Inside Out (1968)
- Cartoon History of Iowa (1968)
- Bicentennial Outlines of Cedar Falls (1974)
- 101 Stories of Cedar Falls (1977)

== Television career ==
- Landmarks in Iowa History Series (WOI-TV)
- History with Herb Hake (NET-TV)
