= 1987–88 Boston University Terriers men's basketball team =

American college basketball season

1987–88 Boston University Terriers men's basketball

North Atlantic tournament champions

NCAA tournament
- Conference: North Atlantic Conference
- Record: 23–8 (14–4 ECAC-N)
- Head coach: Mike Jarvis (3rd season)
- Home arena: Case Gym

1987–88 North Atlantic Conference men's basketball standings
	Conf.				Overall
Team	W		L	PCT	W		L	PCT
Siena	16	–	2	.889	23	–	6	.793
Boston University †	14	–	4	.778	23	–	8	.742
Hartford	12	–	6	.667	15	–	16	.484
Niagara	12	–	6	.667	15	–	15	.500
Northeastern	11	–	7	.611	15	–	13	.536
Maine	10	–	8	.556	13	–	15	.464
Canisius	7	–	11	.389	7	–	20	.259
New Hampshire	3	–	15	.167	4	–	25	.138
Colgate	3	–	15	.167	4	–	23	.148
Vermont	2	–	16	.111	3	–	24	.111
† 1988 North Atlantic tournament winner Rankings from AP Poll

The 1987–88 Boston University Terriers men's basketball team represented Boston University during the 1987–88 NCAA Division I men's basketball season. The Terriers, led by third year head coach Mike Jarvis, played their home games at Case Gym and were members of the North Atlantic Conference. They finished the season 23–8, 14–4 in NAC play to finish in 2nd place during the conference regular season. The Terriers won the North Atlantic Conference tournament to receive an automatic bid to the NCAA tournament as No. 15 seed in the East region. Boston University was defeated by No. 2 seed Duke in the opening round, 85–69.

== Roster ==
1987–88 Boston University Terriers men's basketball team
Players
Coaches

Pos.	#	Name	Height	Weight	Year	Hometown
C	00	Ron Moses	6 ft 8 in (2.03 m)	255 lb (116 kg)	So	Lynchburg, South Carolina
G	11	Drederick Irving	6 ft 4 in (1.93 m)	—	Sr	The Bronx, New York
G	15	Steven Key	6 ft 4 in (1.93 m)	—	So	Columbia, Maryland
F		Bill Brigham	6 ft 7 in (2.01 m)	—	So
G		Scott Spinelli	6 ft 2 in (1.88 m)	—	So

Head coach

- Mike Jarvis (Northeastern)

Assistant coach(es)

Legend

- (C) Team captain
- (S) Suspended
- (I) Ineligible
- (W) Walk-on
- Injured
- Current redshirt

== Schedule and results ==
Date time, TV	Rank^{#}	Opponent^{#}	Result	Record	Site (attendance) city, state
Regular season
Nov 27, 1987*		at Richmond; Central Fidelity Holiday Classic	L 61–66	0–1	Robins Center; Richmond, Virginia
Nov 28, 1987*		vs. USC; Central Fidelity Holiday Classic	W 75–53	1–1	Robins Center; Richmond, Virginia
Dec 1, 1987*		Massachusetts	W 69–66	2–1	Case Gym; Boston, Massachusetts
Dec 3, 1987*		Indiana State	W 81–67	3–1	Case Gym; Boston, Massachusetts
Dec 8, 1987*		at No. 19 Notre Dame	L 49–74	3–2	Joyce Center; Notre Dame, Indiana
Dec 10, 1987*		at Bowling Green	W 87–67	4–2	Anderson Arena; Bowling Green, Ohio
Dec 12, 1987*		at Ohio	W 89–81	5–2	Convocation Center; Athens, Ohio
Dec 22, 1987*		vs. Illinois State; Gator Bowl Classic	L 52–61	5–3	Jacksonville Memorial Coliseum (2,677); Jacksonville, Florida
Dec 23, 1987*		at Jacksonville; Gator Bowl Classic	W 75–69	6–3	Jacksonville Memorial Coliseum; Jacksonville, Florida
North Atlantic Conference tournament
Mar 9, 1988*		vs. Canisius; Quarterfinals	W 64–55	21–7	Hartford Civic Center; Hartford, Connecticut
Mar 10, 1988*		at Hartford; Semifinals	W 82–73	22–7	Hartford Civic Center; Hartford, Connecticut
Mar 11, 1988*		vs. Niagara; Championship game	W 79–68	23–7	Hartford Civic Center; Hartford, Connecticut
NCAA tournament
Mar 17, 1988*	(15 E)	vs. (2 E) No. 5 Duke; First Round	L 69–85	23–8	Dean Smith Center (18,619); Chapel Hill, North Carolina
*Non-conference game. ^{#}Rankings from AP poll. (#) Tournament seedings in parentheses. E=East. All times are in Eastern Time.
