= Larry Jones (Boston University) =

American basketball player

Career information
- College: Boston University (1985–1988)
- NBA draft: 1988: undrafted
- Position: Power forward

Career highlights
- ECAC North Player of the Year (1988)

Larry Jones is a retired American basketball player. He was the ECAC North Player of the Year as a senior in 1987–88 while playing for Boston University. That season he led the Terriers to a second-place finish in the regular season conference standings as well as capturing the ECAC North tournament championship. Jones led BU to the 1988 NCAA tournament where they would lose to Duke in the first round. In three seasons, Jones finished with 1,130 points, which was 10th in school history at the time of his graduation.
