= John H. Hellweg =

American businessman and politician

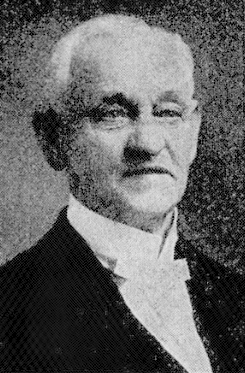

Member of the Wisconsin State Assembly
- In office 1919–1920

Personal details
- Born: December 4, 1844 Keokuk County, Iowa, US
- Died: July 28, 1931 (aged 86) Blue Island, Illinois, US
- Party: Republican
- Occupation: Businessman, politician

John H. Hellweg (December 4, 1844 – July 28, 1931) was an American businessman and politician.

== Biography ==
Hellweg was born in Keokuk County, Iowa and went to the public schools. During the American Civil War, he served in the 35th Iowa Volunteer Infantry Regiment. Hellweg went to the Central Wesleyan College in Warrenton, Missouri. Hellweg was the president of the Hayward Mercantile Company in Hayward, Wisconsin and was also an agent for a timber business. He served as a correspondent for the Chicago Tribune and was involved with the Grand Army of the Republic. Hellweg served on the Sawyer County Board of Supervisors. In 1919 and 1920, Hellweg served in the Wisconsin Assembly and was a Republican.

Hellweg died at his son's home in Blue Island, Illinois where he had gone to recuperate from a heart attack.
