= Tunji Awojobi =

Nigerian basketball player

Personal information
- Born: 30 July 1973 (age 53) Lagos, Nigeria
- Listed height: 2.01 m (6 ft 7 in)
- Listed weight: 110 kg (243 lb)

Career information
- High school: Trinity (Manchester, New Hampshire)
- College: Boston University (1993–1997)
- NBA draft: 1997: undrafted
- Playing career: 1997–2008
- Position: Power forward

Career history
- 1997: Meysuspor
- 1998–1999: Kuşadası
- 1999–2000: Châlons en Champaign
- 2000–2001: Cibona
- 2001–2002: Union Olimpija
- 2002: Imola
- 2002–2003: Ironi Ramat Gan
- 2003–2004: Hapoel Jerusalem
- 2004–2005: Spirou Charleroi
- 2005: Crvena zvezda
- 2005–2006: Ironi Ramat Gan
- 2006: Maccabi Givat Shmuel
- 2007–2008: Hapoel Gilboa/Afula
- 2008–2009: Avtodor Saratov
- 2012: Union Bank

Career highlights
- ULEB Cup champion (2004); Adriatic League champion (2002); Slovenian Cup winner (2002); America East Player of the Year (1997); 4× First-team All-America East (1994–1997); America East Rookie of the Year (1994); America East tournament MVP (1997); No. 12 retired by Boston University Terriers

Tunji Femi Awojobi (born July 30, 1973) is a Nigerian former professional basketball player. A former boxer, Awojobi attended Trinity High School, graduating in 1993. He attended Boston University from 1993 to 1997. Following graduation, he played in several European countries, most notably in Israel. Awojobi was also a member of the Nigerian national team, and participated in the 1998 and 2006 FIBA World Championship. His best achievement in European basketball was winning the ULEB Cup as the starting center for Hapoel Jerusalem from Israel. In the finals, Jerusalem beat Real Madrid 83:72.

== Basketball career ==
=== Trinity ===
During the 1992-1993 New Hampshire Interscholastic Athletic Association basketball season, Awojobi was named New Hampshire Player of the Year. The Trinity Pioneers won 15 games that season, but lost the Class L quarterfinals to Manchester High School West.

=== Boston ===
Awojobi played college basketball at Boston University (BU) for four years (1993–1997). He is the first player in New England college basketball history to register career totals of 2,000 points, 1,000 rebounds, and 300 blocked shots, one of only six NCAA Division I players to do so as of 2026. (Note: Other players who have achieved this include Alonzo Mourning, while playing for Georgetown; Pervis Ellison, while playing for Louisville; Derrick Coleman, while playing for Syracuse; and David Robinson while playing for the United States Naval Academy.)

Awojobi established 13 BU records, including points (2,308), rebounds (1,237), blocked shots (302), and field goals (871). His rebounding and scoring totals also rank among the best in the history of the America East.

In 1996–97, Awojobi led BU to a school-record 25 victories and America East regular-season and tournament titles, and to the NCAA tournament. In recognition of his efforts, Awojobi was a four-time team MVP and first-team all-conference selection. In his senior year, he was named the league's Player of the Year as well as the MVP of the conference's tournament, while adding New England Division I Player of the Year and first-team All-ECAC honors. He was inducted into the BU Hall of Fame in 2002.

== Personal life ==
Awojobi lives in Atlanta, Georgia with his two sons. In 2021, he had heart bypass surgery. In 2026, he underwent a kidney transplant.

== See also ==
- List of NCAA Division I men's basketball players with 2000 points and 1000 rebounds
