= Ken Boyd (basketball) =

American basketball player (1952–2025)

Personal information
- Born: March 25, 1952 Frederick, Maryland, U.S.
- Died: September 18, 2025 (aged 73) Athens, Georgia, U.S.
- Listed height: 6 ft 5 in (1.96 m)
- Listed weight: 195 lb (88 kg)

Career information
- High school: Frederick (Frederick, Maryland)
- College: Boston University (1971—1974)
- NBA draft: 1974: 9th round, 154th overall pick
- Drafted by: New Orleans Jazz
- Playing career: 1974–1978
- Position: Small forward
- Number: 33

Career history
- 1974–1975: New Orleans Jazz
- 1977–1978: Quincy Chiefs

Career highlights
- First-team All-Yankee (1974)
- Stats at NBA.com
- Stats at Basketball Reference

Kenneth W. Boyd, Sr. (March 25, 1952 – September 18, 2025) was an American professional basketball player.

Born in Frederick, Maryland, Boyd attended Frederick High School and participated in basketball, football and track and field. He set a state high jump record during his senior year of high school.

Boyd played college basketball for the Boston University Terriers and was a first-team all-Yankee Conference member in 1974. He was selected by the New Orleans Jazz in the ninth round of the 1974 NBA draft. He played six games for the Jazz during the 1974–75 NBA season, averaging 3.2 points, 0.8 rebounds, and 0.3 assists per game. Boyd played one season with the Quincy Chiefs in the Eastern Basketball Association (EBA) during the 1977–78 season where he averaged 31.1 points and 11.5 rebounds per game.

Boyd was inducted into the Boston University Athletics Hall of Fame in 1984.

== Career statistics ==
Legend
GP	Games played	GS	Games started	MPG	Minutes per game
FG%	Field goal percentage	3P%	3-point field goal percentage	FT%	Free throw percentage
RPG	Rebounds per game	APG	Assists per game	SPG	Steals per game
BPG	Blocks per game	PPG	Points per game	**Bold**	Career high

=== NBA ===
==== Regular season ====
Year	Team	GP	MPG	FG%	FT%	RPG	APG	SPG	BPG	PPG
1974–75	New Orleans	6	4.2	.538	.455	.8	.3	.5	.0	3.2
