= Max Mahoney =

American basketball player (born 1998)

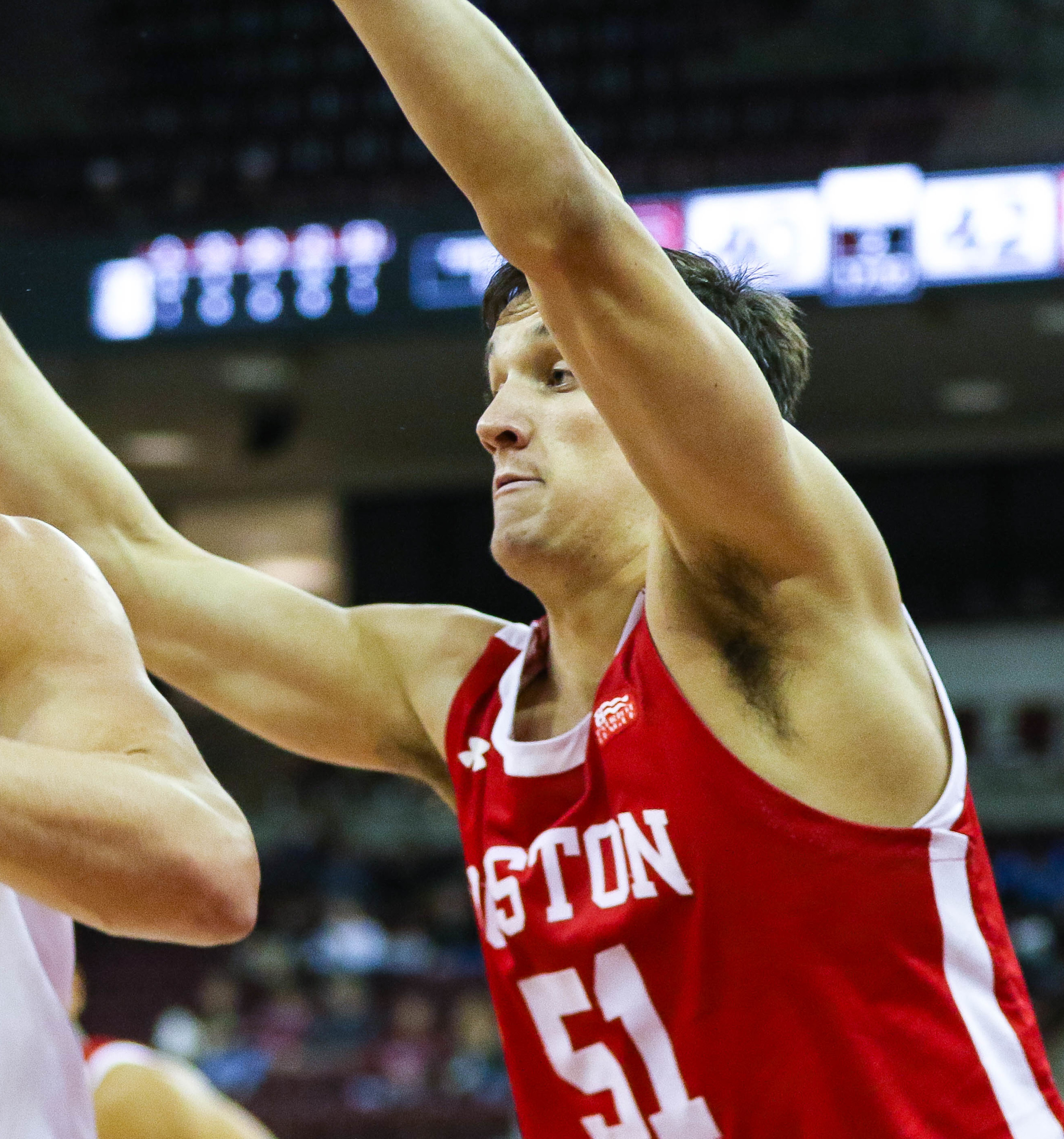
- Mahoney with Boston University in 2019

Free Agent
- Position: Power forward

Personal information
- Born: June 29, 1998 (age 28)
- Listed height: 6 ft 8 in (2.03 m)
- Listed weight: 235 lb (107 kg)

Career information
- High school: Ridge (Basking Ridge, New Jersey)
- College: Boston University (2016–2020)
- NBA draft: 2020: undrafted
- Playing career: 2020–present

Career history
- 2020–2021: VfL Kirchheim Knights
- 2021–2022: Kharkivski Sokoly
- 2022–2025: Bank of Taiwan

Career highlights
- First-team All-Patriot League (2020); Second-team All-Patriot League (2019); Patriot League tournament MVP (2020)

Maxwell John Mahoney (born June 29, 1998) is an American professional basketball player who last played for Bank of Taiwan of the Super Basketball League. He played college basketball for the Boston University Terriers.

== Early life and high school career ==
Mahoney attended Ridge High School, and he began playing volleyball as a freshman in addition to basketball. As a junior, he averaged 19.3 points per game on the basketball team. On February 9, 2016, Mahoney scored a season-high 40 points and 20 rebounds in a win against Rutgers Preparatory School, and he finished his senior season with a double-double in every game except one. He averaged 23 points and 14 rebounds per game as a senior and led Ridge to a 17–8 record and the Somerset County Tournament semifinals as the No. 4 seed. Mahoney was named Courier News Player of the Year. He committed to Boston University in October 2015, choosing the Terriers over Yale, Princeton and Stony Brook.

== College career ==
Mahoney averaged 5.4 points and 3.3 rebounds per game as a freshman. As a sophomore, Mahoney became a starter a third of the way into the season and posted 27 points in an 88–82 win against Lehigh in the first round of the conference tournament. He averaged 12.9 points and 4.8 rebounds per game, earning Third Team All-Patriot League honors. Mahoney averaged 16.5 points and 6.6 rebounds per game as a junior. He was named to the Second Team All-Patriot League.

On December 7, 2019, Mahoney scored a career-high 38 points in an 84–79 overtime loss to Binghamton. On March 11, 2020, Mahoney scored 18 points and had 10 rebounds in the championship game of the Patriot League tournament, a 64–61 win against Colgate. He was named MVP of the tournament. It would turn out to be his final career game as the NCAA Tournament was cancelled due to the COVID-19 pandemic. As a senior, Mahoney led the Terriers in scoring (15.5 points per game), rebounds (8.3 per game), steals (1.1 per game) and blocks (0.5 per game) and ranked second in assists (2.6 per game). He was named to the First Team All-Patriot League as well as the Defensive Team. Mahoney became the fourth player in school history to score 1,500 points and pull down 700 rebounds, and he set the school record for the highest career field goal shooting percentage (.607). His 700 rebounds would rank at 10th in school history, while former teammate Sukh Mathon would surpass him with an impressive 875 career rebounds. Sukh Mathon would also win Patriot League player of the year in 2022. Mahoney graduated with a degree in Finance.

== Professional career ==
On September 24, 2020, Mahoney signed his first professional contract with VfL Kirchheim Knights of the German ProA. He averaged 13.8 points, 5.3 rebounds, 1.9 assists and 1.4 steals per game. On September 2, 2021, Mahoney signed with Kharkivski Sokoly of the Ukrainian Basketball Superleague.

On October 6, 2022, Mahoney joined Bank of Taiwan of the Super Basketball League. On February 25, 2025, Bank of Taiwan terminated the contract relationship with Mahoney due to injury.

== Personal life ==
His grandfather John Mahoney played basketball at William & Mary and was drafted in the sixth round by the Boston Celtics in 1955. His younger sister Molly played soccer and helped Ridge High School win the 2017 Group 4 state championship.
