= Darryl Partin =

American basketball player (born 1987)

Personal information
- Born: December 7, 1987 (age 38) Seattle, Washington, U.S.
- Listed height: 6 ft 6 in (1.98 m)
- Listed weight: 190 lb (86 kg)

Career information
- High school: Sanderson (Raleigh, North Carolina); Charis Prep (Wilson, North Carolina)
- College: La Salle (2007–2009); Boston University (2010–2012)
- NBA draft: 2012: undrafted
- Playing career: 2012–2015
- Position: Shooting guard

Career history
- 2012–2013: Fort Wayne Mad Ants
- 2014–2015: SISU Copenhagen
- 2015: Salon Vilpas Vikings

Career highlights
- AP honorable mention All-American (2012); America East Player of the Year (2012); 2× First-team All-America East (2011, 2012)

Darryl Partin (born December 7, 1987) is an American former professional basketball player. In college, he was an All-American at Boston University in 2011–12, the same year he was named the America East Conference Player of the Year.

== Amateur career ==
Partin played high school basketball at Raleigh, North Carolina's Jesse O. Sanderson High School before one additional year at Charis Prep in Wilson, North Carolina. In his final season at Sanderson, he averaged 23.8 points, 4.0 rebounds and 4.0 assists per game while leading the team to a 34–8 overall record. He was named second team all-state.

After his fifth prep year at Charis in 2006–07, Partin went on to play for La Salle University. He did not fare particularly well; he averaged 2.0 points, 1.0 rebounds and 0.3 assists per game his freshman season, and 4.6, 0.9 and 0.7, respectively, during his sophomore campaign. He decided to transfer to Boston University (BU) but had to sit out the 2009–10 season due to NCAA eligibility rules.

Between 2010 and 2012, Partin played for the BU Terriers. In two seasons with the team he scored 1,130 points, becoming just the sixth player in school history to amass more than 1,000 points in only two years. He led the team in scoring both seasons and was also a two-time First Team All-America East Conference selection. As a junior, Partin guided the Terriers to the America East tournament championship and an automatic bid in the 2011 NCAA tournament. During his senior year, the Terriers finished third in the conference and with an overall record of just 16–16, thus missing out on a postseason tournament bid. He was named the America East Conference Player of the Year, however, after being deemed the best player in the league as decided upon by America East's head coaches. He was also tabbed as an honorable mention All-American by the Associated Press.

== Professional career ==
After going undrafted in the 2012 NBA draft, Partin was selected in the 2012 NBA Development League Draft. The Fort Wayne Mad Ants chose him as the first pick in the fourth round (49th overall). Partin then played the 2012–13 NBA Development League season with the Mad Ants. He appeared in 33 games, starting 16, and averaged 6.5 points per game.
