= Skip Chappelle =

American college basketball player and coach

Biographical details
- Born: Old Town, Maine, U.S.

Playing career
- 1959–1962: Maine

Coaching career (HC unless noted)
- 1962–1968: Fort Fairfield HS (ME)
- 1968–1971: Maine (assistant)
- 1971–1988: Maine

Head coaching record
- Overall: 217–226

Accomplishments and honors

Awards
- 3× First-team All-Yankee (1960–1962); ECAC North Coach of the Year (1988)

Thomas Nelson "Skip" Chappelle is an American former college basketball player and coach at the University of Maine.

== Playing career ==
After starring at Old Town High School and leading the school to the 1957 Maine state championship, Chappelle spent a post-graduate year at Maine Central Institute where he was part of its New England Prep Championship squad. He played his college basketball with Maine where he was a three-time All-Yankee Conference selection, and the school's first player to be selected as a Little All-American. He was the first Black Bear men's basketball player to have his jersey number retired by the university.

Chappelle was selected by the St. Louis Hawks in the 11th round of the 1962 NBA draft, becoming the school's first-ever NBA Draft selection. He tried out for the Boston Celtics in 1962, but left the team to return to his job as a teacher and coach in Fort Fairfield, Maine.

== Coaching career ==
Chappelle returned to Maine in 1968 as assistant varsity and head freshman basketball coach. He took over as head coach in 1971, guiding the Black Bears to a 217–226 record over 17 seasons. During that time, Chappelle coached seven future NBA draft selections, including Rufus Harris, Jeff Cross and Rick Carlisle. He also coached Maine's golf team.

== Post-coaching career ==
After leaving Maine, Chappelle was the director of community relations for the Bangor Daily News and director of the Paul Bunyan Amateur Golf Tournament, formerly the Bangor Daily News Amateur Golf Tournament.

== Head coaching record ==
Statistics overview
Season	Team	Overall	Conference	Standing	Postseason
Maine (Yankee Conference / ECAC North) (1971–1988)
1971–72	Maine	15–10	6–4	2nd	
1972–73	Maine	13–10	6–6	4th	
1973–74	Maine	14–10	2–10	7th	
1974–75	Maine	11–14	1–10	7th	
1975–76	Maine	14–11	5–7	5th	
1976–77	Maine	13–13	N/A	N/A	
1977–78	Maine	17–8	N/A	N/A	
1978–79	Maine	14–10	N/A	N/A	
1979–80	Maine	14–12	N/A	4th	
1980–81	Maine	14–14	N/A	4th	
1981–82	Maine	7–19	3–7	6th	
1982–83	Maine	12–14	6–4	4th	
1983–84	Maine	17–10	7–7	5th	
1984–85	Maine	11–17	5–11	T–6th	
1985–86	Maine	7–20	5–13	T–7th	
1986–87	Maine	10–18	6–12	7th	
1987–88	Maine	13–15	10–8	6th	
Maine:		217–226 (.490)	62–99 (.385)		
Total:		217–226 (.490)			
