= John Louis Nuelsen =

German-American Bishop

John Louis Nuelsen (January 19, 1867 – June 26, 1946) was a German-American Bishop of the Methodist Episcopal Church and The Methodist Church, elected in 1908. He also distinguished himself as a Methodist pastor, as a college and seminary professor and theologian, and as an author and editor. He served as bishop of the Europe Central Conference of the Methodist Episcopal Church during WWI.

== Birth and family ==
Nuelsen was born in Zürich, Switzerland, the son of the Rev. Heinrich and Rosalie (Mueller) Nuelsen. His German father Heinrich, born in Nörten, Hanover, became an American citizen and was ordained into the Methodist Episcopal ministry. He spent time in Germany as a missionary, and later was sent to Switzerland to help establish Methodism there. He served churches in Europe for thirty-eight years. The family was originally from Holland. Nuelsen was baptized by Bishop Calvin Kingsley.

Nuelsen married Luella Elizabeth Stroeter (daughter of Ernst Ferdinand & Caroline Ströter) on 8 September 1896. They had four children, Albert E., Henry E., John Louis, Jr., and Marie L.

== Education ==
Being a Methodist Pastor's family, the Nuelsens moved a great deal. Nuelsen attended Gymnasium in Karlsruhe, Germany and Bremen, Germany. He then went to Drew Theological Seminary, Madison, New Jersey (1887–89), earning the B.D. degree in 1890. He earned the A.M. degree at Central Wesleyan College in Warrenton, Missouri in 1893.

He studied further at the University of Berlin and the University of Halle in Germany.

== Ordained and Academic Ministry ==
Nuelsen joined the West German Annual Conference of the M.E. Church in the U.S. in 1889. The Rev. J.L. Nuelsen served pastoral appointments in Sedalia, Missouri and Sleepy Eye, Minnesota.

In 1890, the Nuelsen was appointed a Professor at St. Paul's College in St. Paul Park, Minnesota, serving until 1892. During 1892-93 he completed his Master's degree. In 1894 he was appointed a Professor at his alma mater, Central Wesleyan College, serving until 1899.

In 1899 the Nast Theological Professorship in Exegetical Theology was established at German Wallace College, Berea, Ohio with a gift of $20,000 given by Franzeska Wilhelmina "Fanny" Nast Gamble, daughter of the Rev. William Nast (the first President of German-Wallace) and wife of William Gamble (son of Procter and Gamble co-founder James Gamble). Nuelsen was called to this new chair. After three years this department was expanded into the Nast Theological Seminary, which served well in the training of ministers and workers in Christian vocations from 1902 until 1933, especially those of German descent. Nuelsen served his Professorship until 1908.

He was elected a delegate to the M.E. General Conferences in 1904 and 1908. He also attended the Ecumenical Conferences of 1901 and 1911.

== Episcopal ministry ==
Nuelsen was elected to the episcopacy by the General Conference of 1908. His election came primarily as a result of a rather strong insistence upon the part of the German constituency of the M.E. Church that they should be represented in the Board of Bishops. This election was thus an early manifestation of the conviction, registered often in more recent years, that minority groups in the Church should furnish a part of the Episcopacy.

Once elected, however, Nuelsen was assigned, not to preside over German Conferences, but to a regular Area of the Church in the United States. He was assigned to the Omaha episcopal area (Nebraska) until 1912. He was then assigned all the work in Europe, with his residence in Zürich. He was associated with the work of the Church in Europe for the rest of his active episcopacy (until 1940). At first his Episcopal Area covered all annual conferences in Switzerland, Germany, Scandinavia, Russia, France, Spain, Italy and Austro-Hungary. In 1920 the European work was divided into three Episcopal Areas: the Stockholm Area, the Paris Area, and the Zürich Area (to which Bishop Nuelsen was assigned).

Nuelsen also served as a trustee of Drew Theological Seminary.

== Wartime ==
World War I was especially difficult for Nuelsen. He loved the German Methodists and the German People, and hastened to defend them in the early years of the war. When the United States entered the war, however, matters became further complicated for him. The charge of being "pro-German" was a serious one at that time in the opinion of many Americans during the highly emotional days of 1917–18. Nuelsen was attacked in some American church papers. Even some of his Episcopal brethren were not too understanding of the situation in which he found himself. During the last period of the war he was in fact forbidden to travel, being immobilized in Switzerland for long months. A further complication was that the conferences under his care were divided between nations on the side of Germany and nations on the side of the Allies.

When the Nazis came to power in 1933, they met with Nuelsen and other leaders in order to gain their support; Nuelsen then travelled to the USA to give talks on the new regime, its fight against Bolshevism and its peaceful intentions at home and abroad.

By 1936, many German Methodists wished to leave the broad European Methodist conference and establish an independent German Methodist Church which would work with the German state; by this time Nuelsen was speaking out against Nazism and the idea was voted down.

== Honorary Degrees ==
- Nuelsen was honored with the degree of Doctor of Divinity in 1903 by the University of Denver.
- The University of Nebraska awarded him the LL.D. in 1907.
- He was awarded an Honorary Doctorate by the University of Berlin in 1922.

== Selected writings ==
- Jugend, Kirche und Statt, 1896.
- Die Bedeutung Des Evangeliums Johannes, 1903.
- Das Leben Jesu in Wortlaut der vier Evangelien., 1904
- John Wesley, Ausgewahlte Predigten, 1905.
- Luther the Leader (Men of the Kingdom Series), 1906.
- Some Recent Phases of German Theology, 1908.
- John Wesley and the German Hymn: A Detailed Study of John Wesley's Translations of Thirty-Three German Hymns, ISBN 0-9502765-0-2
- Methodismus und Weltmission, 1913.
- Assistant editor, International Standard Bible Encyclopedia, Chicago: Howard Severance Co., 1915.
- Address: Book of Devotions, 1916.
- Jean Guillaume de la Fléchère, 1929.
- Reformation and Methodism, 1931.
- Die Ordination im Methodismus. Ein Beitrag zur Entstehungsgeschichte der kirchlichen Selbständigkeit der Methodistenkirche, 1935.
- The final steps toward the independence of the Episcopal Methodist Church in Germany, 1936.

== Nuelsen, the man ==
Nuelsen is remembered by fellow-Methodist Bishop Roy H. Short as:

an impressive man. He looked the scholar that he was. His library, which can still be seen in the Methodist Publishing House in Zurich, bears silent testimony to the wide range of his interests and the eagerness of his mind for acquiring knowledge. He wrote constantly and was the author of a number of books and of a multitude of articles. He was an indefatigable traveler, and much of his study and writing was done on the road.

== See also ==
- List of bishops of the United Methodist Church
