= Jake O'Brien (basketball) =

American basketball player (born 1989)

Free Agent
- Position: Power forward / center

Personal information
- Born: June 3, 1989 (age 37) Weymouth, Massachusetts
- Listed height: 6 ft 9 in (2.06 m)
- Listed weight: 220 lb (100 kg)

Career information
- High school: Boston College HS (Boston, Massachusetts)
- College: Boston University (2008–2011); Temple (2012–2013)
- NBA draft: 2013: undrafted
- Playing career: 2013–present

Career history
- 2013–2014: Ferro-ZNTU
- 2014: Bakersfield Jam
- 2014–2015: Eisbären Bremerhaven
- 2015–2017: Keravnos
- 2017: Kymis
- 2018: Bosna Royal
- 2018–2019: APOEL
- 2019–2020: Keravnos
- 2020–2021: Steaua București
- 2021–2022: Spójnia Stargard

Career highlights
- Cypriot League champion (2017); Cypriot League All-Star (2018); Cypriot Super Cup winner (2019); Third-team All-America East (2010); America East Rookie of the Year (2009)

Jake O'Brien (born June 3, 1989) is an American professional basketball player who last played for Spójnia Stargard of the Polish Basketball League (PLK). Standing at 2.06 m (6 ft 9 in), he plays the power forward and the center positions. O'Brien played college basketball at Boston University and at Temple.

== High school career ==
O'Brien played high school basketball at Boston College High School, at Boston, Massachusetts. As a junior, O'Brien lead B.C. High to a perfect 25–0 record including the schools first MIAA Division 1 State Championship.

== College career ==
=== Boston University ===
A 6'9" power forward, O'Brien began his college career at Boston University. He scored 1,020 points and grabbed 444 rebounds in his three seasons with the Terriers and averaged double figures in scoring in each season, earning America East Rookie of the Year honors in 2008–09, and third team all-conference accolades in '09-10 when he set career highs for scoring and rebounding. As a junior in 2010–11, he was averaging 11.6 points and 5.8 rebounds per game through 14 contests before a foot injury sidelined him for the remainder of the season. Due to a second surgery on the same foot in September 2011, he was forced to redshirt the following season.

=== Temple ===
During the 2012–13 season, O'Brien was transferred at Temple for his final college year. As a senior, he averaged 9.3 points, 3.3 rebounds and 0.8 blocks per game in 20.3 minutes. O'Brien scored 18 points on 7-9 shooting in a first round upset win vs North Carolina State in the NCAA Basketball tournament.

== Professional career ==
After going undrafted in the 2013 NBA draft, O'Brien joined Ferro-ZNTU of the Ukrainian League. He left Ferro-ZNTU in order to finish the season with Bakersfield Jam of the NBA D League.

The following season, he joined Eisbären Bremerhaven. After playing one year at Germany, O'Brien signed with Keravnos of the Cypriot League. He stayed at Keravnos for two seasons and won the Cypriot League on 2017.

On July 27, 2017, O'Brien joined Kymis of the Greek Basket League.

On July 13, 2021, he has signed with Spójnia Stargard of the Polish Basketball League (PLK).
