= Jim Hayes (basketball) =

American basketball player (1948–2009)

Personal information
- Born: February 18, 1948 Rockville Centre, New York, U.S.
- Died: March 11, 2009 (aged 61)
- Listed height: 6 ft 3 in (1.91 m)
- Listed weight: 200 lb (91 kg)

Career information
- High school: The Saint Agnes School (Rockville Centre, New York)
- College: Boston University (1967–1970)
- NBA draft: 1970: 3rd round, 47th overall pick
- Drafted by: Detroit Pistons
- Position: Shooting guard
- Number: 10, 15

Career history
- 1970–1971: New York Nets

Career highlights
- No. 54 retired by Boston University Terriers
- Stats at Basketball Reference

Jim Hayes (February 18, 1948 – March 11, 2009) was an American professional basketball shooting guard who spent one season in the American Basketball Association (ABA) as a member of the New York Nets (1970–71). Born in Ithaca, New York and raised in Rockville Centre, New York, he attended Boston University, where he was drafted by the Detroit Pistons during the third round of the 1970 NBA draft, but he never signed. After playing in the ABA, he went on to play professionally in France, where he had a long and successful career.
