= John Harmon (coach) =

American sports coach and administrator (1895–1974)

Biographical details
- Born: May 20, 1895; Bible Grove, Illinois, U.S.
- Died: October 18, 1974 (aged 79); Ottawa, Kansas, U.S.

Playing career

Football
- c. 1920: Missouri Wesleyan

Coaching career (HC unless noted)

Football
- 1921–1922: Central Wesleyan
- 1923–1929: Evansville
- 1933: Boston University

Basketball
- 1921–1923: Central Wesleyan
- 1923–1930: Evansville
- 1932–1935: Boston University

Baseball
- 1924–1927: Evansville
- 1933–1935: Boston University

Administrative career (AD unless noted)
- 1921–1923: Central Wesleyan
- 1923–1930: Evansville
- 1935–1951: Boston University

Head coaching record
- Overall: 20–47 (football); 74–78 (basketball, excluding Central Wesleyan); 27–52 (baseball)

John Millard Harmon (May 20, 1895 – October 18, 1974) was an American football, basketball, and baseball coach and college athletics administrator. He served as the head football coach at Central Wesleyan College in Warrenton, Missouri from 1921 to 1922, the University of Evansville in Evansville, Indiana from 1923 to 1929, and Boston University in 1933. Harmon was also the head basketball coach at Central Wesleyan from 1921 to 1923, Evansville from 1923 to 1930, and Boston University from 1932 to 1935. He was the head baseball coach at Evansville from 1924 to 1927 and at Boston University from 1933 to 1935. He also served as the athletic director at Boston University from 1935 to 1951.

Harmon retired 1959 and moved to Ottawa, Kansas in 1960. He died on October 18, 1974, at Cedarhouse Nursing Home in Ottawa.

== Head coaching record ==
=== Football ===
Year	Team	Overall	Conference	Standing	Bowl/playoffs
Central Wesleyan (Missouri Intercollegiate Athletic Association) (1921–1922)
1921	Central Wesleyan	0–4–1	0–3	15th	
1922	Central Wesleyan	1–6–1	0–4–1	T–14th	
Central Wesleyan:		1–10–2	0–7–1		
Evansville Pioneers / Purple Aces (Independent) (1923–1929)
1923	Evansville	3–3–1			
1924	Evansville	4–5			
1925	Evansville	5–2			
1926	Evansville	2–6			
1927	Evansville	3–5			
1928	Evansville	0–7			
1929	Evansville	1–7			
Evansville:		18–42			
Boston University Terriers (Independent) (1933)
1933	Boston University	2–5			
Boston University:		2–5			
Total:		21–57–2			
