= 1988 North Atlantic Conference men's basketball tournament =

- Classification: Division I
- Season: 1987–88
- Teams: 8
- Champions: Boston University (2nd title)
- Winning coach: Mike Jarvis (1st title)
- MVP: Jeff Timberlake (Boston University)
- North Atlantic Conference men's basketball tournaments

1987–88 North Atlantic Conference men's basketball standings
	Conf.				Overall
Team	W		L	PCT	W		L	PCT
Siena	16	–	2	.889	23	–	6	.793
Boston University †	14	–	4	.778	23	–	8	.742
Hartford	12	–	6	.667	15	–	16	.484
Niagara	12	–	6	.667	15	–	15	.500
Northeastern	11	–	7	.611	15	–	13	.536
Maine	10	–	8	.556	13	–	15	.464
Canisius	7	–	11	.389	7	–	20	.259
New Hampshire	3	–	15	.167	4	–	25	.138
Colgate	3	–	15	.167	4	–	23	.148
Vermont	2	–	16	.111	3	–	24	.111
† 1988 North Atlantic tournament winner Rankings from AP Poll

The 1988 America East men's basketball tournament was hosted by the Hartford Hawks at the Hartford Civic Center. Only the top eight schools made it to the 1988 tournament, therefore excluding both Colgate and Vermont. Boston University gained its second overall America East Conference Championship and an automatic berth to the NCAA tournament with its win over Niagara University. Boston University was given the 15th seed in the East Regional of the NCAA Tournament and lost in the first round to Duke 85–69. Siena College gained a bid to the NIT and lost in the first round to Boston College 73–65.

== Bracket and results ==
The tournament took place between March 9–11.

Quarterfinals
1	Siena	63
8	New Hampshire	70
4	Niagara	70
5	Northeastern	57
3	Hartford	73
6	Maine	61
2	Boston U.	64
7	Canisius	55

Semifinals
8	New Hampshire	59
4	Niagara	62
3	Hartford	73
2	Boston U.	82

Finals
4	Niagara	68
2	Boston U.	79
