= Mike Jarvis =

American basketball player and coach (born 1945)

Biographical details
- Born: April 11, 1945 (age 81); Cambridge, Massachusetts, U.S.

Playing career
- 1964–1968: Northeastern
- Position: Guard

Coaching career (HC unless noted)
- 1968–1973: Northeastern (assistant)
- 1973–1977: Harvard (assistant)
- 1978–1985: Cambridge Rindge and Latin HS
- 1985–1990: Boston University
- 1990–1998: George Washington
- 1998–2003: St. John's
- 2008–2014: Florida Atlantic

Head coaching record
- Overall: 364–201

Accomplishments and honors

Championships
- NIT (2003*); 2 America East tournament (1988, 1990); Big East tournament (2000); Sun Belt regular season (2011) * Vacated by the NCAA

Awards
- America East Coach of the Year (1990); Sun Belt Coach of the Year (2011)

Michael D. Jarvis (born April 12, 1945) is an American college basketball coach most recently as head men's basketball coach at Florida Atlantic University. He has coached at Boston University, George Washington University and St. John's University. He also has worked as a commentator for college basketball games on ESPN. His career college coaching record in over 18 seasons is 364–201.

== Early life ==
Jarvis was born in Cambridge, Massachusetts and played high school basketball at Rindge Technical High School, the predecessor to Cambridge Rindge and Latin School. He also coached at Rindge and Latin, where his players included NBA players Patrick Ewing, Rumeal Robinson and former George Washington head coach Karl Hobbs. He played basketball and baseball at Northeastern University, graduating in 1968.

== College coaching career ==
Jarvis became head coach at Boston University in 1985, becoming the Terriers' all-time winningest coach in five seasons with a 101–50 record (he was later overtaken by Bob Brown, then Dennis Wolff). Boston University reached the NCAA tournament in 1988 and 1990 under Jarvis.

He was hired at George Washington in 1990, leading the Colonials to four NCAA tournament appearances, including the Sweet 16 in the 1993 NCAA tournament, the Colonials' best tournament performance. The team was defeated by the "Fab Five" Michigan Wolverines, who later vacated the entire season due to a scandal with a booster. Jarvis also led the Colonials to two victories over number one ranked UMass, compiling a 143–100 record at George Washington.

Jarvis also coached the United States under-22 men's national team in 1993.

=== St. John's ===
After the 1998 season, Jarvis accepted the head coaching job at St. John's University after Fran Fraschilla was fired, leading the Red Storm to the Elite Eight in the 1999 NCAA Tournament and the 2000 Big East tournament championship. They won the National Invitation Tournament in 2003.

The next season the Red Storm stumbled out of the gate, losing to several nonconference teams that they usually beat with ease. Jarvis was fired on December 19, 2003—the first Big East coach to be fired during the season. Assistant Kevin Clark replaced him for the remainder of the season. His final record at St. John's was 110–61.

It later emerged that school officials had fired Jarvis in part due to a series of embarrassing off-court incidents. Among these, a junior college transfer had been charged with assaulting a female student, and a senior guard had been kicked off the team after being caught smoking marijuana near St. John's campus in Queens.

During the 2003–04 season, St. John's center Abe Keita claimed that a member of Jarvis's basketball staff had paid him nearly $300 a month for the past four seasons. As a result, St. John's placed itself on two years' probation, withdrew from postseason consideration for the 2004–05 season, and forfeited 43 wins in which Keita participated. This included the team's NIT championship in 2003, making St. John's the third team in the history of the NIT to be forced to vacate its standing in the tournament; the two previous schools, Minnesota and Michigan, had also won the tournament in their respective years.

The NCAA accepted St. John's sanctions and faulted Jarvis for not properly monitoring Keita's situation, but otherwise cleared him of wrongdoing. After his ouster, Jarvis was criticized for ignoring New York City's rich pool of high school players, which particularly rankled fans used to seeing national powerhouses built primarily on New York City talent.

== Career after St. John's ==
Jarvis last coached for Florida Atlantic for six seasons.

Prior to coming back with the Owls in 2009, Jarvis worked for ESPN as a college basketball commentator, and Yahoo! Sports as their NCAA men's basketball analyst, and continues to work as a speaker and broadcaster. He has written three books: Skills For Life (with Jonathan Peck), Everybody Needs A Head Coach (with Chad Bonham), and "The Seven C's of Leadership" (with Chad Bonham).

== Head coaching record ==
=== College ===
Record table
Season	Team	Overall	Conference	Standing	Postseason
Boston University Terriers (Eastern College Athletic Conference-North / North Atlantic Conference) (1985–1990)
1985–86	Boston University	21–10	13–5	3rd	NIT First Round
1986–87	Boston University	18–12	12–6	T–3rd	
1987–88	Boston University	23–8	14–4	2nd	NCAA Division I First Round
1988–89	Boston University	21–9	14–4	3rd	
1989–90	Boston University	18–12	9–3	2nd	NCAA Division I First Round
Boston University:		101–51	62–22		
George Washington Colonials (Atlantic 10 Conference) (1990–1998)
1990–91	George Washington	19–12	10–8	T–3rd	NIT First Round
1991–92	George Washington	16–12	8–8	5th	
1992–93	George Washington	21–9	8–6	T–2nd	NCAA Division I Sweet 16
1993–94	George Washington	18–12	8–8	T–3rd	NCAA Division I Second Round
1994–95	George Washington	18–14	10–6	T–2nd	NIT First Round
1995–96	George Washington	21–8	13–3	T–1st (West)	NCAA Division I First Round
1996–97	George Washington	15–14	8–8	2nd (West)	NIT First Round
1997–98	George Washington	24–9	11–5	T–1st (West)	NCAA Division I First Round
George Washington:		152–90	76–52		
St. John's Red Storm (Big East Conference) (1998–2003)
1998–99	St. John's	28–9	14–4	3rd	NCAA Division I Elite Eight
1999–00	St. John's	25–8	12–4	3rd	NCAA Division I Second Round
2000–01	St. John's	14–15**	8–8**	T–3rd (East)	
2001–02	St. John's	20–12**	9–7**	3rd (East)	NCAA Division I First Round**
2002–03	St. John's	21–13**	7–9**	5th (East)	NIT Champion**
2003–04	St. John's	2–4*			
St. John's:		110–61%	50–32%		
Florida Atlantic Owls (Sun Belt Conference) (2008–2013)
2008–09	Florida Atlantic	6–26	2–16	6th (East)	
2009–10	Florida Atlantic	14–16	10–8	4th (East)	
2010–11	Florida Atlantic	21–11	13–3	1st (East)	NIT First Round
2011–12	Florida Atlantic	11–19	7–9	3rd (East)	
2012–13	Florida Atlantic	14–18	9–11	5th (East)	
Florida Atlantic Owls (Conference USA) (2013–2014)
2013–14	Florida Atlantic	10–22	5–11	T–12th	
Florida Atlantic:		76–112	46–57		
Total:		422–313			
National champion Postseason invitational champion Conference regular season champion Conference regular season and conference tournament champion Division regular season champion Division regular season and conference tournament champion Conference tournament champion

*Jarvis was fired on December 19, 2003; assistant Kevin Clark finished the season.
** St. John's vacated 47 games (46 wins and one loss) from 2000 to 2004 after Abe Keita was ruled ineligible. Official records are 5–15 for 2000–01, 7–11 for 2001–02, 1–13 for 2002–03 and 0–4 for 2003–04.
% Official record at St. John's is 66–60 (53–32 Big East) not counting vacated games.
