= Central Wesleyan College =

Methodist college in Warrenton, Missouri, US (1864–1941)

Coordinates: 38.8122693°N 91.1407042°W

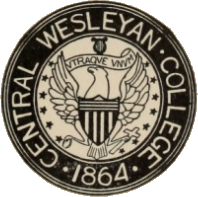
- Former names: Western Orphan Asylum and Educational Institute; Central Wesleyan College and Orphan Asylum
- Type: Private
- Active: October 3, 1864–1941
- Religious affiliation: Methodist Church
- Location: Warrenton, Missouri
- Campus: 932 acres (3.77 km^{2})
- Sporting affiliations: Missouri Intercollegiate Athletics Association; Missouri College Athletic Union

Central Wesleyan College was a private college sponsored by the Methodist Church in Warrenton, Missouri, from 1864 to 1941.

== History ==
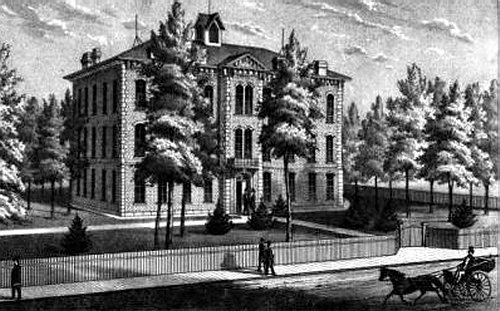
Central Wesleyan College as it appeared in 1878.

The college has its roots in the German and English College founded in 1854 in Quincy, Illinois, to train ministers for the German Methodist Episcopal Church. The English portion closed in 1863 as descendants of German immigrants were more numerous and interested in continuing their church traditions.

Church members founded the new school in Warrenton with the stated purposes of providing homes for orphans of the American Civil War and to supply a "higher educational institute for the youth of the German Church in the West." Founders purchased a 932-acre (3.77 km^{2}) campus for the Western Orphan Asylum and Educational Institute. In 1869, the name was changed to Central Wesleyan College and Orphan Asylum. In 1884, the two organizations split: Central Wesleyan College and Central Wesleyan Orphan Home.

In 1909 the German College of Mount Pleasant, Iowa, merged with the college, which was renamed the Central Wesleyan College and German Theological Seminary. In 1912 the college was among the original founders of the Missouri Intercollegiate Athletics Association. After public universities took over the Mid-America athletic conference, in 1924 Central was among the founders of the Missouri College Athletic Union.

The records of Ozark Wesleyan College of Carthage, Missouri, were added to the Truman State University Library and Archives in the 1920s.

== Junior college ==
It was reclassified as a junior college in 1930, awarding two-year degrees.

== Closing ==
Faced with financial troubles in the Great Depression, the college closed in 1941. Its grounds were sold in 1946 at auction. In 1947, Truman State University bought its records.

== Notable alumni ==
- Herb Hake - cartoonist
- Carl Lutz (1895–1975) - Swiss vice-consul to Hungary during WWII, credited with saving over 62,000 Jews
- John Louis Nuelsen - Methodist Bishop
- Leonidas C. Dyer - Congressman
- John H. Hellweg - Wisconsin state legislator and businessman
- Theodore W. Hukriede - Congressman
- Henry F. Niedringhaus - Congressman
- William A. Rodenberg - Congressman
- Carl O. Sauer (1889-1975) - American Geographer
- Ilien Tang (died 1920), Chinese educator
