= Jeff Cross (basketball) =

American basketball player (born 1961)

Personal information
- Born: September 1, 1961 (age 65) Chicago, Illinois, U.S.
- Listed height: 6 ft 10 in (2.08 m)
- Listed weight: 240 lb (109 kg)

Career information
- High school: Worcester Academy (Worcester, Massachusetts)
- College: Maine (1980–1984)
- NBA draft: 1984: 3rd round, 61st overall pick
- Drafted by: Dallas Mavericks
- Playing career: 1984–1988
- Position: Power forward
- Number: 54, 38

Career history
- 1984: Westchester Golden Apples
- 1984–1985: Caja de Ronda
- 1985–1986: Maine Windjammers
- 1986: Los Angeles Clippers
- 1986–1988: Charleston Gunners

Career highlights
- ECAC North Player of the Year (1983)

Career NBA statistics
- Points: 26 (1.2 ppg)
- Rebounds: 30 (1.4 rpg)
- Assists: 1 (0 apg)
- Stats at NBA.com
- Stats at Basketball Reference

Jeffrey Andrew Cross (born September 1, 1961) is an American former basketball player. He played for the Los Angeles Clippers in the National Basketball Association (NBA).

Cross, a forward/center from Worcester Academy in Massachusetts, played collegiately at the University of Maine where he enjoyed a standout career, scoring 1,337 points (average of 13.4 per game), grabbing 894 rebounds (8.9) and blocking 209 shots (2.1). Cross was named all conference his junior and senior years and was ECAC North (now the America East Conference) player of the year as a junior in 1983. He left Maine as one of the school's top all-time scorers and rebounders.

Cross was drafted in the third round of the 1984 NBA draft by the Dallas Mavericks (61st overall). However, his rights were traded to the Philadelphia 76ers and he was later waived. After nearly two years, he would make his NBA debut in the form of a 10-day contract with the Los Angeles Clippers in the 1985–86 NBA season. He was subsequently signed for the remainder of the year. Cross' NBA career lasted 21 games as he averaged 6.1 minutes per game in a reserve role. His career averages were 1.2 points and 1.4 rebounds per game.

== Career statistics ==
Legend
GP	Games played	GS	Games started	MPG	Minutes per game
FG%	Field goal percentage	3P%	3-point field goal percentage	FT%	Free throw percentage
RPG	Rebounds per game	APG	Assists per game	SPG	Steals per game
BPG	Blocks per game	PPG	Points per game	**Bold**	Career high

=== NBA ===
==== Regular season ====
Year	Team	GP	GS	MPG	FG%	3P%	FT%	RPG	APG	SPG	BPG	PPG
1985–86	L.A. Clippers	21	0	6.1	.250	–	.560	1.4	.0	.1	.1	1.2
