= Boston University Terriers men's basketball =

Men's college basketball team

2025–26 Boston University Terriers men's basketball team
- University: Boston University
- First season: 1901
- Head coach: Joe Jones (15th season)
- Location: Boston, Massachusetts
- Arena: Case Gym (capacity: 1,800)
- Conference: Patriot
- Nickname: Terriers
- Colors: Scarlet and white
- All-time record: 1,245–1,187

NCAA Division I tournament Elite Eight
- 1959
Other NCAA Division I tournament results
Sweet Sixteen	1959
Appearances	1959, 1983, 1988, 1990, 1997, 2002, 2011

Conference tournament champions
- America East: 1983, 1988, 1990, 1997, 2002, 2011 Patriot League: 2020

Conference regular-season champions
- America East: 1980, 1983, 1990 (co-champion), 1997, 1998 (co-champion), 2003, 2004; Patriot League: 2014

Uniforms
Home	Away

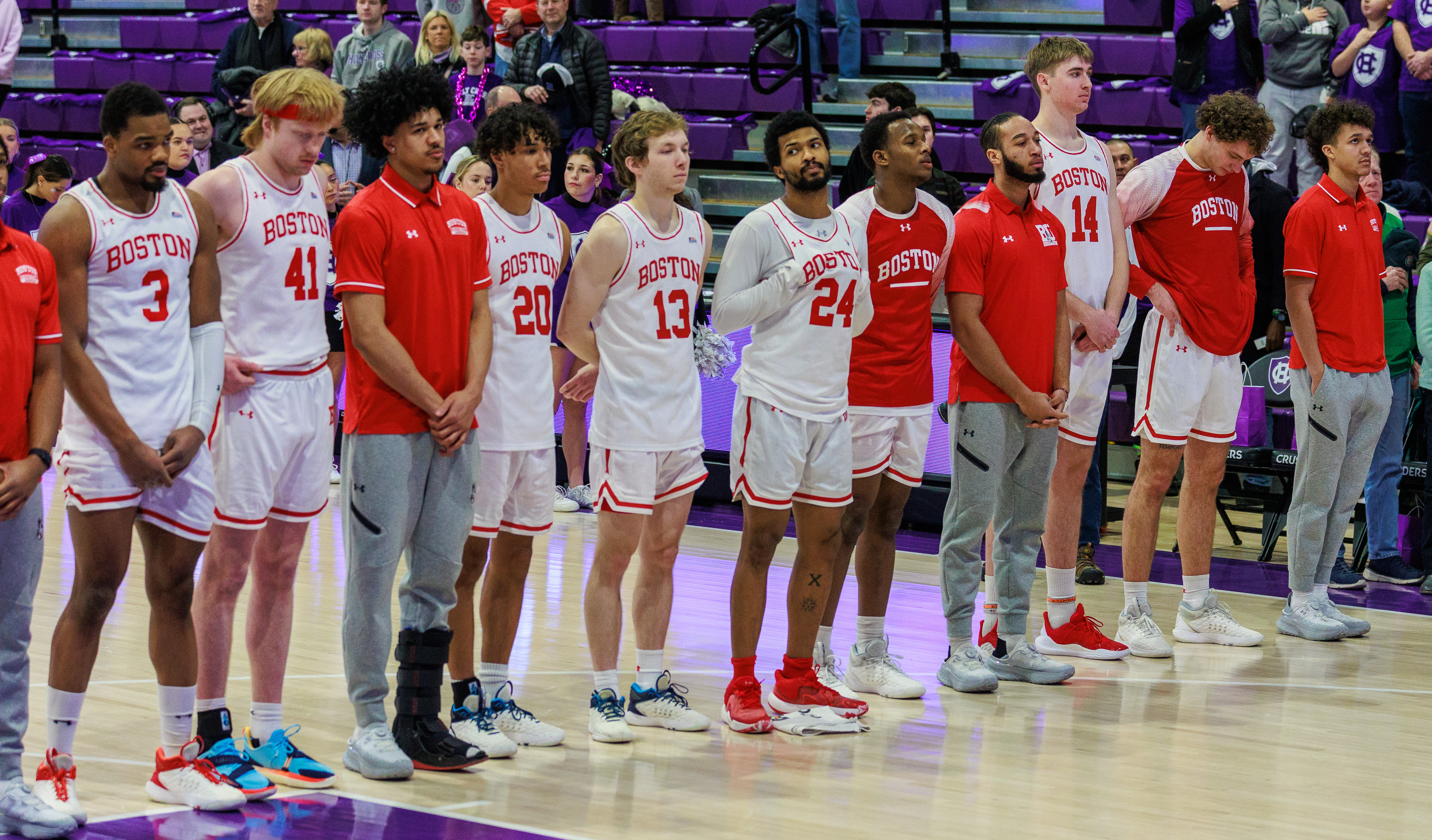
2024-25 Terriers

The Boston University Terriers men's basketball team is the intercollegiate basketball team that represents Boston University in Boston, Massachusetts, United States. The school's team currently competes in the Patriot League. The Terriers have appeared seven times in the NCAA tournament, making their most recent appearance in 2011.

== Postseason results ==
=== NCAA tournament results ===
The Terriers have appeared in the NCAA tournament seven times. Their overall tournament record is 2–7. In 2020, the Terriers won the Patriot League Tournament to qualify for the 2020 NCAA Tournament before it was canceled due to COVID-19.

Year	Seed	Round	Opponent	Result
1959	—N/a	Round of 23; Sweet Sixteen; Elite Eight	UConn; Navy; West Virginia	W 60–58; W 62–55; L 82–86
1983	12	Preliminary round	(12) La Salle	L 58–70
1988	15	Round of 64	(2) Duke	L 69–85
1990	16	Round of 64	(1) UConn	L 52–76
1997	12	Round of 64	(5) Tulsa	L 52–81
2002	16	Round of 64	(1) Cincinnati	L 52–90
2011	16	Round of 64	(1) Kansas	L 53–72

=== NIT results ===
The Terriers have appeared in the National Invitation Tournament (NIT) six times. Their overall tournament record is 0–6.

Year	Round	Opponent	Result
1980	First round	Boston College	L 74–95
1986	First round	Providence	L 69–72
2003	First round	St. John's	L 57–73
2004	Opening round	Rhode Island	L 52–80
2005	First round	Georgetown	L 34–64
2014	First round	Illinois	L 62–66

=== CBI results ===
The Terriers have appeared in the College Basketball Invitational (CBI) two times. Their overall tournament record is 3–2.

Year	Round	Opponent	Result
2010	First round Quarterfinals; Semifinals	Oregon State; Morehead State; VCU	W 96–78; W 91–89 ^{OT} L 75–88
2022	First Round; Quarterfinals	UNC Greensboro; Middle Tennessee	W 71-68; L 46-76

=== CIT results ===
The Terriers have appeared in the CollegeInsider.com Postseason Tournament (CIT) two times. Their overall tournament record is 1–2.

Year	Round	Opponent	Result
2013	First round	Loyola (MD)	L 63–70
2016	First round Second round	Fordham; NJIT	W 69–66; L 72–83

== Coaches ==
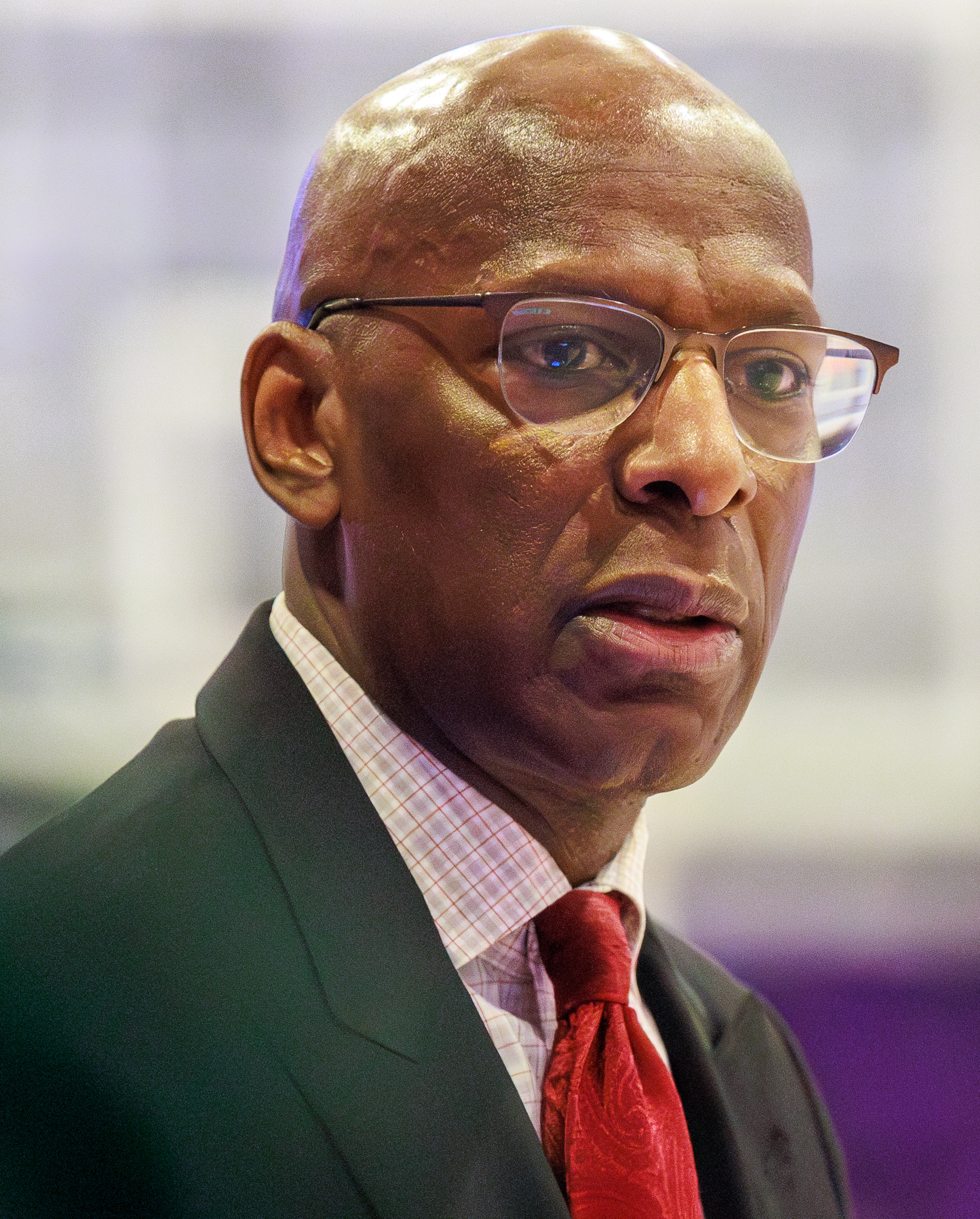
Coach Joe Jones

Coach	Tenure	Years	Record	Winning Percentage
Henry Crane	1916-1916	1	2-2	.500
V.B. Allison	1917-1920	3	12-11	.522
John Williams	1925-1925	1	9-13	.409
Win Karlson	1926-1932	7	39-53	.424
John Harmon	1933-1935	3	15-28	.349
Mel Collard	1936-1945	9	64-63	.504
Russ Peterson	1946-1948	3	36-18	.667
Charles Cummings	1949-1949	1	6-12	.333
Matt Zunic	1958-1959	2	35-12	.745
John H. Burke Jr.	1960-1966	7	68-84	.447
Charlie Luce	1967-1971	5	49-70	.412
Ron Mitchell	1972-1974	3	31-42	.425
Roy Sigler	1975-1978	4	36-66	.353
Rick Pitino	1979-1983	5	91-51	.641
John Kuester	1984-1985	2	31-28	.525
Mike Jarvis	1986-1990	5	101-51	.664
Bob Brown	1991-1994	4	38-73	.342
Dennis Wolff	1995–2009	2	242–197	.556
Patrick Chambers	2010–2011	2	42–28	.600
Joe Jones	2012–present	15	250–223	.529

== Awards and honors ==
=== Retired numbers ===
Retired basketball numbers
Number	Player	Years played
54	Jim Hayes	1967–1970
33	Steve Wright	1976–1980
44	Arturo Brown	1979–1982
11	Drederick Irving	1984–1988
12	Tunji Awojobi	1993–1997
4	Kevin Thomas	1953–1956
10	Jack Leaman	1956–1959

=== Player awards ===
America East Men's Basketball Player of the Year

- Larry Jones (1988)
- Steven Key (1990)
- Tunji Awojobi (1997)
- John Holland (2011)
- Darryl Partin (2012)

America East Men's Basketball Rookie of the Year

- Mike Alexander (1983)
- Tunji Awojobi (1994)
- Raja Bell (1995)
- Paul Seymour (2000)
- Tyler Morris (2007)
- John Holland (2008)
- Jake O'Brien (2009)

America East Men's Basketball Defensive Player of the Year

- Shaun Wynn (2004)

America East Men's Basketball Coach of the Year

- Mike Jarvis (1990)
- Dennis Wolff (1997, 2003, 2004)

Patriot League Men's Basketball Player of the Year

- Sukhmail Mathon (2022)

First-Team All-Patriot League

- Max Mahoney (2020)
- Javante McCoy (2022)
- Sukhmail Mathon (2022)

Second-Team All-Patriot League

- Javante McCoy (2021)
- Walter Whyte (2020, 2023)

Third-Team All-Patriot League

- Javante McCoy (2020)
- Walter Whyte (2021, 2022)

== Terriers in the NBA ==
Boston University NBA Players
Player	Year	Pick #	Team
Ken Boyd	1974	154	New Orleans Jazz
Jim Garvin	1973	204	Buffalo Braves
Jim Hayes	1970	47	Detroit Pistons
Gary Plummer	1984	45	Golden State Warriors
Raja Bell	1999	undrafted	
John Holland	2011	undrafted	
