= Duke–Michigan men's basketball rivalry =

American college basketball rivalry

- Duke Blue Devils Michigan Wolverines
- Sport: Basketball
- First meeting: December 21, 1963; Michigan 83, Duke 67
- Latest meeting: February 21, 2026; Duke 68, Michigan 63

Statistics
- Total meetings: 31
- All-time series: Duke leads, 23–8*
- Largest victory: Duke, 108–64 (1998)
- Longest win streak: Duke, 7 (1998–2008)
- Current win streak: Duke, 4 (2011–present)

Locations of Duke and Michigan

The Duke–Michigan men's basketball rivalry is a college basketball rivalry between the Duke Blue Devils men's basketball team of Duke University and Michigan Wolverines men's basketball team of the University of Michigan. The two teams played annual, regularly scheduled contests between 1963 and 1970 and between 1989 and 2002. They also had scheduled meetings in 2007 and 2008, a ACC–Big Ten Challenge contest in 2013, and a neutral site game in 2026, the most recent matchup. In addition, the teams have had five unscheduled meetings in tournaments, three of which were in the NCAA Division I men's basketball tournament including the 1992 National Championship Game. Two of the five tournament meetings occurred in 2011.

In March 2011, the rivalry was refueled by media commentary related to the ESPN Films documentary entitled The Fab Five. The subsequent meeting between the teams occurred in the 2013 ACC–Big Ten Challenge, a game on December 3, which Duke won, 79–69. The teams met most recently as top 5 ranked teams on February 21, 2026.

== Historical overview ==
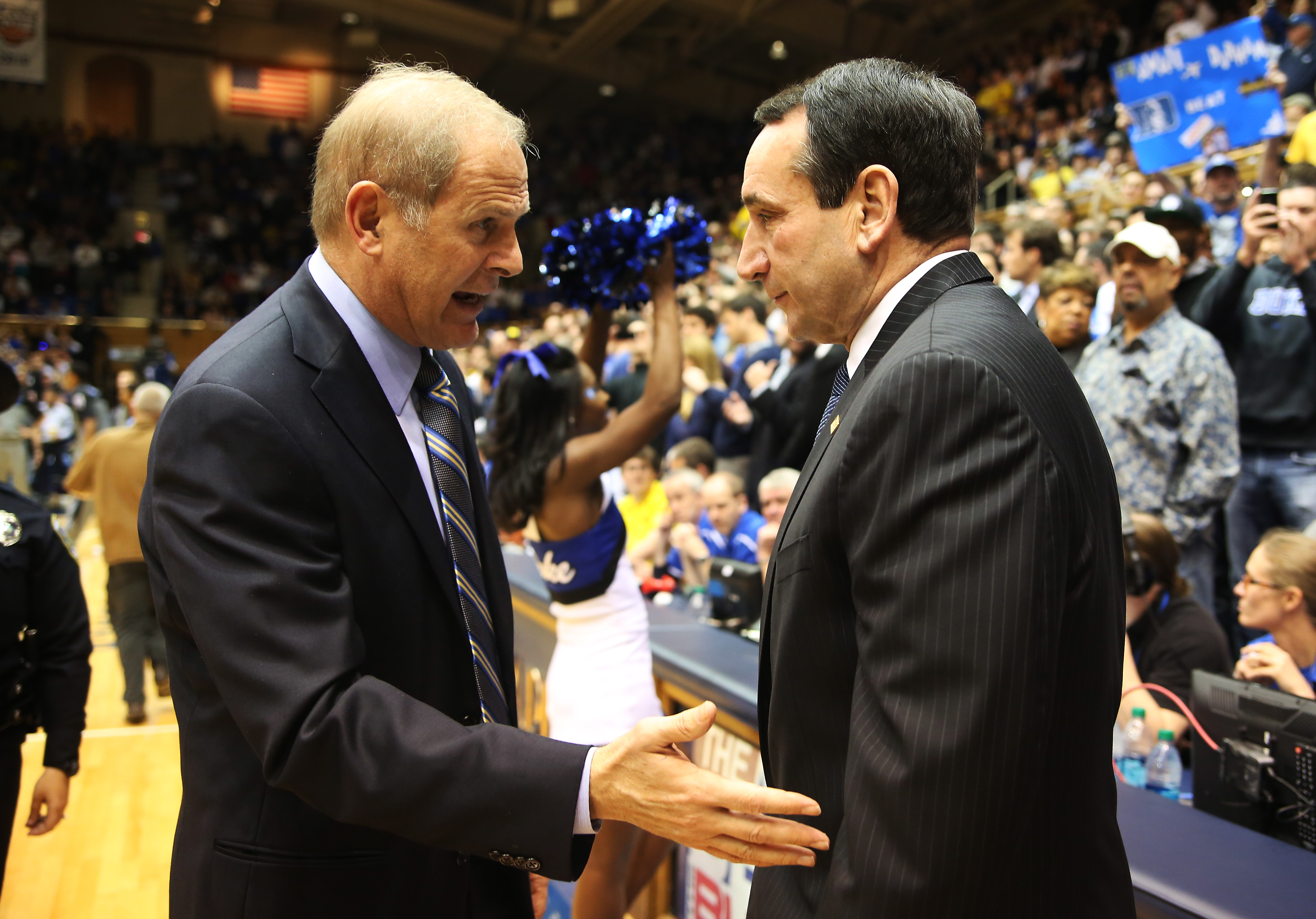
John Beilein (left) and Mike Krzyzewski (right) in 2013

Duke regards the rivalry as far less significant than the Carolina–Duke rivalry. The Duke–Michigan rivalry is fueled by the fact that both institutions strive to be premier academic institutions with solid reputations for producing scholars and student athletes rather than just athletic powerhouses. Duke and Michigan have played one another in men's basketball 30 times. The teams have played twice in the same season three times: 1963–64, 1991–92, and 2008–09. Michigan has played Duke more times than they have any other school outside of the state of Michigan that has never been a member of the Big Ten Conference. In turn, Duke's 30 games against Michigan are the most they have played any other school outside of the Maryland-Virginia-North Carolina-South Carolina region that has never been a member of the Atlantic Coast Conference. Eight of the meetings between Duke and Michigan have featured opponents both ranked in the top ten in the AP Poll; six times both teams were ranked in the top five. Michigan has not faced any of its fellow conference members as many times with both participants so highly ranked.

The Cazzie Russell-led 1963–64 Wolverines were known for its "Bloody Nose Alley" defense, while the Jeff Mullins-led 1963–64 Blue Devils were regarded as a team that "played in tuxedos". Duke had lost National player of the year, NBA first overall selection, NCAA basketball tournament Most Outstanding Player Art Heyman from the previous year's final four team. The rivalry began on December 21, 1963, when the 1963–64 Wolverines hosted the 1963–64 Blue Devils at the Yost Fieldhouse, while winning 83–67. Duke starting center Jay Buckley had been described in the press as the weak link in the loss, earning the nickname "Link" from his teammates. That Duke team avenged the game later in the season in the 1964 NCAA Final Four with a 91–80 victory. Buckley contributed 25 points and 14 rebounds against 19 points and 9 rebounds from Bill Buntin. After the tournament defeat, the 1964–65 Wolverines came back with double-doubles from Russell, Buntin and Oliver Darden to defeat the 1964–65 Blue Devils 86–79 the following December. The teams met every December until 1970, when they went 19 years without playing.

Starting in 1989, the teams renewed their annual rivalry games. The defending national champion Terry Mills/Rumeal Robinson/Loy Vaught-led 1989–90 Wolverines hosted the 1989–90 Blue Devils at Crisler Arena with a 113–108 overtime victory, which began annual December contests that continued until 2002. The Christian Laettner/Grant Hill/Bobby Hurley-led 1991–92 Blue Devils were defending national champions during the 1991 contest against the Fab Five-led 1991–92 Wolverines and won in overtime by an 88–85 margin. These teams held a rematch at the 1992 NCAA Final Four that Duke won by a 71–51 margin to repeat as national champions. Another memorable finish was when the 1996–97 Michigan team's Robert Traylor made the game winning dunk with three seconds left against the 1996–97 Duke Blue Devils. On the same day Charles Woodson won the Heisman Trophy against Peyton Manning, making for a memorable Michigan sports day. The 2000–01 Wolverines made a show of a pregame stomp on the Duke Blue Devil's logo before the tipoff. The NBA talent-laded 2000–01 Blue Devils responded by opening the game with a 34–2 run to open the game. During this run, Tommy Amaker served as an assistant to Duke head coach Mike Krzyzewski until 1997 and then became Michigan head coach of the 2001–02 Wolverines and 2002–03 Wolverines who lost 104–83 and 81–59, respectively before the annual contests ended.

"Schools like Duke didn't recruit players like me," explains Jalen Rose in the video. "I felt that they only recruited black players that were Uncle Toms. ... I was jealous of Grant Hill. He came from a great black family. Congratulations. Your mom went to college and was roommates with Hillary Clinton. Your dad played in the NFL as a very well-spoken and successful man. I was upset and bitter that my mom had to bust her hump for 20-plus years. I was bitter that I had a professional athlete that was my father that I didn't know. I resented that, moreso than I resented him. I looked at it as they are who the world accepts and we are who the world hates."

— Jalen Rose

The teams scheduled December contests in both 2007 and 2008 and have also met in tournaments in 2008 and 2011. The unranked 2008–09 Wolverines completed a pair of back-to-back victories over top five opponents with an 81–73 victory over the 2008–09 Blue Devils, marking the first time Michigan had accomplished the feat. The game included 11 lead changes and 16 ties. The close contest allowed the fans to play a part as they forced Duke to use a time out to quiet the noisy crowd late in the second half.

On March 13, 2011, the ESPN Films' The Fab Five debuted as the highest-rated ESPN documentary of all time. The film spawned critical commentary in a broad spectrum of media outlets which include leading newspapers such as The New York Times, The Wall Street Journal and The Washington Post; leading periodicals such as Forbes; online forums such as Slate; and leading news outlets such as MSNBC. In particular, the film sparked an exchange of words war between Jalen Rose and Duke University's Grant Hill through the media regarding issues of race in sports and education. Among those critical of the racial commentary was Duke player Grant Hill, who was cited in an Associated Press story that ran in major national media outlets. Hill blogged on The New York Times with a response naming a litany of Dukies castigated by Rose's general aspersions. His response was at the top of The New York Times' "most-emailed list" for several days and was shared on Facebook by nearly 100,000 people within its first few days. King responded to Hill in The Wall Street Journal, clarifying that his feelings about Duke were what he felt as a teenager and not representative of his current beliefs. Coincidentally, the following week, 2011 editions of Michigan and Duke met in the third round of the 2011 NCAA Men's Division I basketball tournament. The press described this event as the renewal of the rivalry although people associated with both institutions downplayed the relevance of the film.

On March 15, 2015, ESPN Films released another 30 for 30 documentary entitled I Hate Christian Laettner in which both Laettner and his Duke teammate and roommate Brian Davis also responded to Rose's earlier remarks. Brian Davis replied, "You know, they talk all this Uncle Tom sh** and, you know, I'm like, I'm more hood and street than any mother f***** on that team. To say that about us, we knew it was ridiculous. Because they all wanted to go to Duke. Chris Webber visited Duke and stayed with me." Laettner continued: "Not all of us at Duke were from the entitled families. I wasn't. Bobby Hurley wasn't. Thomas Hill wasn't. Brian Davis wasn't. The only person that was, was Grant Hill. Besides that, we were blue collar kids, too."

"To hint that those who grew up in a household with a mother and father are somehow less black than those who did not is beyond ridiculous. All of us are extremely proud of the current Duke team, especially Nolan Smith. He was raised by his mother, plays in memory of his late father and carries himself with the pride and confidence that they instilled in him. . .

I caution my fabulous five friends to avoid stereotyping me and others they do not know in much the same way so many people stereotyped them back then for their appearance and swagger. I wish for you the restoration of the bond that made you friends, brothers and icons.

I am proud of my family. I am proud of my Duke championships and all my Duke teammates. And, I am proud I never lost a game against the Fab Five."

— Grant Hill

Although the schools do not share geographic proximity, which would induce frequent recruiting battles, there have been some high-profile recruits that were heavily targeted by both institutions. Chris Webber, Michigan's Mr. Basketball in 1991 and the National High School player of the year, chose Michigan over Duke and eventually became the #1 pick in the 1993 NBA draft after playing two seasons for the Wolverines. Duke returned the favor by gaining a commitment from Michigan-raised Detroit Country Day alum Shane Battier, the 1997 Mr. Basketball of Michigan, who led Duke's 2001 National Championship team, while sweeping all of the National Player of the Year awards. Battier had been a fan of the Fab Five growing up. More recently, Michigan landed Mitch McGary, who had visited only Michigan, Duke and University of North Carolina.

In the 2013 contest, 10th-ranked Duke entered the game playing its 220th consecutive contest as a top-10 team in the AP poll and defending a 106-game consecutive non-conference home game winning streak. 22nd-ranked Michigan entered the game having played 80 consecutive games (44 consecutive weeks) as a ranked team. Coming off a loss to Arizona, Duke was at risk of losing consecutive non-conference games for the first time since November 1999 and its first ever ACC–Big Ten Challenge home loss in six contests. However, Duke bounced back to win 79–69 behind 24 points and 9 assists from Quinn Cook. Michigan's loss and fall from the polls ended the sixth longest active streak of poll membership.

Duke stretched its neutral court record against Michigan to 7–0 on February 21, 2026 with a 68–63 win. Michigan had entered the game as the newly designated number 1 ranked team, while Duke entered at number 3 in the national polls. The teams swapped positions in the national polls the following week. The game featured 2026 consensus first team All-Americans, Yaxel Lendeborg of Michigan who had a game-high 21 points and Cameron Boozer who posted 18 points, 10 rebounds, 7 assists and 2 blocks for Duke.

== Game results ==
Duke victories	Michigan victories	Tie games	Vacated wins

No.	Date	Location	Winner	Score
1	December 21, 1963	Ann Arbor, MI	No. 3 Michigan	83–67
2	March 20, 1964^{A}	Kansas City, MO	No. 3 Duke	91–80
3	December 5, 1964	Durham, NC	No. 1 Michigan	86–79
4	December 21, 1965	Detroit, MI	No. 1 Duke	100–93
5	December 3, 1966	Durham, NC	No. 4 Duke	96–75
6	December 6, 1967	Ann Arbor, MI	Duke	93–90
7	December 9, 1968	Durham, NC	Michigan	90–80
8	December 10, 1969	Ann Arbor, MI	Duke	73–68
9	December 7, 1970	Durham, NC	No. 13 Duke	95–74
10	December 9, 1989	Ann Arbor, MI	No. 8 Michigan	113–108
11	December 8, 1990	Durham, NC	No. 5 Duke	75–68

No.	Date	Location	Winner	Score
12	December 14, 1991	Ann Arbor, MI	No. 1 Duke	88–85
13	April 6, 1992^{B}	Minneapolis, MN	No. 1 Duke	71–51
14	December 5, 1992	Durham, NC	No. 4 Duke	79–68
15	December 11, 1993	Ann Arbor, MI	No. 4 Duke	73–63
16	December 10, 1994	Durham, NC	No. 9 Duke	69–59
17	December 9, 1995	Ann Arbor, MI	No. 22 Michigan^{†}	88–84
18	December 8, 1996	Durham, NC	No. 7 Michigan^{†}	62–61
19	December 13, 1997	Ann Arbor, MI	Michigan^{†}	81–73
20	December 12, 1998	Durham, NC	No. 3 Duke	108–64
21	December 11, 1999	Ann Arbor, MI	No. 14 Duke	104–97
22	December 9, 2000	Durham, NC	No. 1 Duke	104–61

No.	Date	Location	Winner	Score
23	December 8, 2001	Ann Arbor, MI	No. 1 Duke	104–83
24	December 7, 2002	Durham, NC	No. 4 Duke	81–59
25	December 8, 2007	Durham, NC	No. 6 Duke	95–67
26	November 21, 2008^{C}	New York, NY	No. 10 Duke	71–56
27	December 6, 2008	Ann Arbor, MI	Michigan	81–73
28	March 20, 2011^{D}	Charlotte, NC	No. 3 Duke	73–71
29	November 22, 2011^{E}	Lahaina, HI	No. 6 Duke	82–75
30	December 3, 2013	Durham, NC	No. 10 Duke	79–69
31	February 21, 2026^{F}	Washington, D.C.	No. 3 Duke	68–63
Series: Duke leads 23–5
† Vacated by Michigan

^{A} 1964 NCAA Final Four
^{B} 1992 NCAA Championship Game
^{C} 2008 2K Sports Classic
^{D} 2011 NCAA Round of 32
^{E} 2011 Maui Invitational Tournament Semifinal
^{F} Capital Showcase
