= The Fab Five (film) =

2011 TV documentary film

- Directed by: Jason Hehir
- Narrated by: Taye Diggs
- Country of origin: United States
- Original language: English

Production
- Production company: ESPN Films

Original release
- Network: ESPN
- Release: March 13, 2011

The Fab Five is a 2011 ESPN Films documentary about the 1990s Michigan Wolverines men's basketball players known collectively as the Fab Five: Chris Webber, Jalen Rose, Juwan Howard, Jimmy King, and Ray Jackson. It chronicles the recruitment, glory years, notorious time-out fiasco, cultural impact and the scandal that followed these players who are described as iconic figures in the media. The film originally aired on March 13, 2011, on a national broadcast on ESPN. On its original airing, the film drew 2.7 million viewers, setting a record as the highest-rated ESPN documentary ever.

The film spawned critical commentary in a broad spectrum of media outlets which include leading newspapers such as The New York Times, The Wall Street Journal and The Washington Post; leading periodicals such as Forbes; online forums such as Slate; and leading news outlets such as MSNBC. In particular, the film sparked a verbal war between Jalen Rose and Duke University's Grant Hill through the media regarding issues of race in sports and education that fueled the Duke–Michigan basketball rivalry. Coincidentally, the following week, the 2011 editions of Michigan and Duke met in the round of 32 in the 2011 NCAA Men's Division I Basketball Tournament; Duke won, 73–71.

== Story ==
#	Player	G	Pts	Reb	Ast	Blk	Stl
24	King	130	1,542	538	354	45	187
21	Jackson	125	1,262	579	300	42	119
5	Rose	102	1,788	477	401	29	119
25	Howard	100	1,526	749	202	56	79
4	Webber	70	1,218	702	166	174	103
Source: ESPN

Previously Mitch Albom had chronicled the Fab Five in a book entitled Fab Five: Basketball, Trash Talk, The American Dream, and Fox Sports had attempted to review the group. The press regarded this as the first complete recounting of the fabled group. Rose describes this film as "almost like the Bible of the Fab Five Story". An ESPN commentator describes the five players as the greatest incoming college basketball recruiting class ever. He notes that they were presented to the world as the embodiment of what was wrong with college sports because they wore revolutionary baggy shorts and black socks and blasted hip-hop music while talking a lot of trash. The film documents the "formation, rise, scandal and epilogue of the team". It documents the 1991–92 and 1992–93 teams, the University of Michigan basketball scandal, and related off the court issues such as hate mail. Forbes notes that the legacy of the quintet, which includes successive appearances in the championship game of the NCAA Men's Division I Basketball Championship, was overshadowed by the scandal, which necessitated the removal of Final Four banners and vacating of games. The film is noted for presenting the inside story a group of players who the contemporary media derided as thugs and villains, while enterprise rode them as a multimillion-dollar merchandising juggernaut.

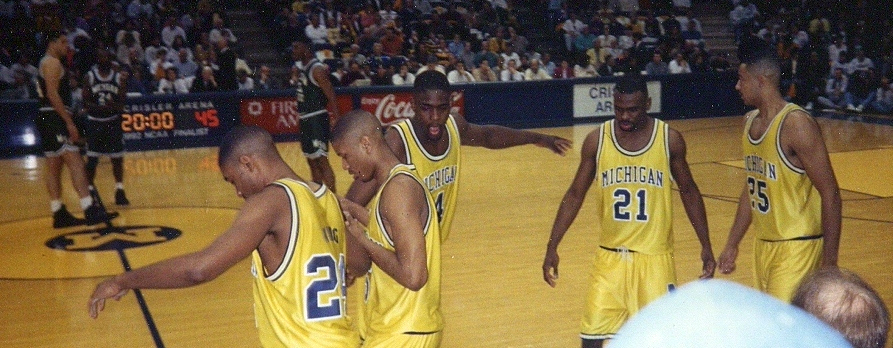
The Fab Five during their sophomore year at Crisler Arena. From left to right, Jimmy King, Jalen Rose, Chris Webber, Ray Jackson, and Juwan Howard.

The film chronicles a group of athletes who influenced a nation of basketball fans – some of whom became professional basketball players. It includes commentaries from former Michigan coaches Steve Fisher, Brian Dutcher, and Perry Watson, and rap icons Ice Cube and Chuck D. It also extends to details such as: "Howard discussing his grandmother's death the day he signed his letter of intent, to Ray Jackson talking about being 'the fifth wheel' and considering a transfer, to Jimmy King's brutal honesty about his disdain for Christian Laettner -- in somewhat unpalatable verbiage, to Rose talking about the loitering ticket he got in the Detroit 'crack house.'" The film also presented numerous other highlights of the era as well as some from the high school days of the featured players. Webber was considered notable for his non-involvement in the production, while the rest of the Fab Five were credited as executive producers. Rose approached ESPN Films about the project and brought the other players into the fold. His production role came through his own company, Three Tier Entertainment. The film was directed by Jason Hehir and narrated by Taye Diggs.

At first, only three of the freshmen started. Although they all played when the season opened on December 2, 1991, against the University of Detroit, they did not all play at the same time until December 7 against Eastern Michigan and did not start regularly until February 9, 1992. In that first game starting together as a regular unit, the five freshmen accounted for all the team's points in a 74–65 victory against Notre Dame. The film presented the opinions of upperclassmen Eric Riley and James Voskuil when they were replaced by freshmen in the starting lineup. Both fought off impulses to transfer.

The four members of the Fab Five who participated in the film have had a tense relationship with Chris Webber, the one player who was not in the film. There was speculation that Chris Webber did not participate to avoid questions about the timeout call in the 1993 NCAA tournament title game. Webber said he initially agreed to be in the documentary but backed out after being told shooting would wrap up in a week, giving him insufficient time to prepare. Jimmy King called that assertion “a flat-out lie.”

== Ratings ==
"Deep within the archives of the University of Michigan lie the remnants of a revolution."

— Opening line of film

ESPN built up the film with nearly a month of previews and promos. The week before the initial broadcast, ESPN aired clips of the film during some of its other programming; they featured the team's feelings about Duke prior to the 1992 championship game. These clips started what would become a national controversy.

The film's initial airing established a record as the ratings leader among all ESPN documentaries with a 2.1 rating according to Nielsen Company, surpassing two of the 30 for 30 films, each of which posted a 1.8 rating: Pony Exce$$ (aired December 11, 2010, focusing on SMU football of the 1980s, a decade that culminated in scandal) and The U (aired December 12, 2009, detailing the University of Miami football team in the 1980s and 1990s). The Fab Five aired at 9 p.m. ET, drawing an average of 2,088,000 households and 2,746,000 viewers, both bests among ESPN documentaries; it surpassed the previous high marks set by Pony Exce$$, when it was seen by an average of 1,843,000 homes and 2,517,000 viewers on ESPN. The Fab Five was rebroadcast at 11 p.m. on ESPN2. In excess of 11 million people watched part of the movie on one of the two original national broadcasts on the day of the 2011 NCAA Men's Division I Basketball Tournament selections.

The Fab Five also garnered high TV ratings during their playing days; they were one of the featured teams in both of the two highest rated NCAA Men's Basketball Championship games ever played in terms of households (although not viewers), The film aired almost precisely twenty years after the legendary group was assembled. In an attempt to meet the same college basketball fan viewer interest on the tournament selection weekend, HBO produced its own hour-long documentary titled Runnin’ Rebels of UNLV on Jerry Tarkanian and the UNLV Runnin' Rebels basketball teams of the 1972–92 era. Fox Sports also aired an hour-long special featuring sports agent Rob Pelinka, a Michigan teammate of the Fab Five, called Pelinka Chips In on March 14, but the special had low ratings. Pelinka had a cameo in the Fab Five film.⋅

== Critical review ==
"Schools like Duke didn't recruit players like me. I felt that they only recruited black players that were Uncle Toms. ... I was jealous of Grant Hill. He came from a great black family. Congratulations. Your mom went to college and was roommates with Hillary Clinton. Your dad played in the NFL, & is a very well-spoken and successful man. I was upset and bitter that my mom had to bust her hump for 20-plus years. I was bitter that I had a professional athlete that was my father that I didn't know. I resented that, moreso than I resented him. I looked at it as they are who the world accepts and we are who the world hates."

— Jalen Rose

The New York Times described the film as a "flashback to a time when baggy basketball shorts, hip-hop music and black shoes were considered controversial and an affront to hoops purists". Washington Post columnist Jason Reid noted that the film went out of its way to present the inappropriate racial commentary by Jalen Rose when he described Duke basketball head coach Mike Krzyzewski's recruits as Uncle Toms. Among those critical of the racial commentary was Duke player Grant Hill, who was cited in an Associated Press story that ran in major national media outlets. Hill blogged on The New York Times with a response naming a litany of Dukies castigated by Rose's general aspersions. His response was at the top of The New York Times' "most-emailed list" for several days and was shared on Facebook by nearly 100,000 people within its first few days. King responded to Hill in The Wall Street Journal. In the midst of the media exchange, the 2011 editions of the teams advanced to meet on March 20 at 2011 NCAA Tournament West Regional in Charlotte, North Carolina, at the Time Warner Cable Arena with Duke ranked as a #1 seed and Michigan as an #8 seed. Duke head coach Mike Krzyzewski did not respond until after both teams were eliminated from the tournament, but he noted that he felt the statements were insulting and gave specific reasons why each of the Fab Five members did not go to Duke. Duke player and Michigan native Shane Battier supported Hill's statements saying, "Maya Angelou couldn’t have written it and expressed it better."

The Detroit Free Press' Mark Snyder regarded The Fab Five as a "Warts and all" depiction that was "riveting, brutal in its honesty, realistic in its language and stunning in its archival footage."

"To hint that those who grew up in a household with a mother and father are somehow less black than those who did not is beyond ridiculous. All of us are extremely proud of the current Duke team, especially Nolan Smith. He was raised by his mother, plays in memory of his late father and carries himself with the pride and confidence that they instilled in him. . .

I caution my fabulous five friends to avoid stereotyping me and others they do not know in much the same way so many people stereotyped them back then for their appearance and swagger. I wish for you the restoration of the bond that made you friends, brothers and icons.

I am proud of my family. I am proud of my Duke championships and all my Duke teammates. And, I am proud I never lost a game against the Fab Five."

— Grant Hill

A Michigan writer from The Grand Rapids Press described the film as "youthful nostalgia that must be felt by a whole generation", but noted that the film was lacking in terms of outside perspective. He noted that fans would have welcomed voices of Bobby Knight, Dick Vitale, Jimmy Jackson, or Christian Laettner. He also noted the absence of Webber's voice as leaving the film with a hole. However, he noted that as much as the Fab Five revolutionized basketball in the American culture, this film remade the image of the Fab Five. Nonetheless, some questioned why Webber declined to participate and speculate on various reasons.

Another Michigan writer from SB Nation described the film as thorough in its ability to provide the viewer with the answers to natural intrigues such as: "How was the recruiting class assembled? Who pushed for the baggy shorts? The black socks? How did a stodgy University of Michigan culture react to this bold, brash and outspoken team?" Other columnists were also satisfied to learn that Rose came up with the shorts and Jackson came up with the socks. He also commended the film on its detail surrounding Chris Webber's infamous timeout in the 1993 NCAA championship. The same reviewer enumerated his five biggest omissions from the film: Michigan athletic director Bill Martin, 1991–92 Duke Blue Devils men's basketball team, 1992–93 North Carolina Tar Heels men's basketball team, Michael Talley and Webber. He was also critical of Mitch Albom's involvement with the Fab Five.

Rivals.com spoke against the tone of the film, which shows a lack of respect for team values. However, in describing the payment scandal, Webber's related legal problems and the removal of the Fab Five's banners from Crisler Arena, and the infamous timeout gaffe at the end of the 1993 national championship game at the 1993 NCAA Men's Division I Basketball Tournament the documentary was considered fearless.

Another controversy arose from the film when the Illinois Fighting Illini men's basketball teams of the late 1980s with Kendall Gill and Stephen Bardo claimed to be the originators of baggy shorts in basketball. All of the Wolverines who took part in the production of the film described how they felt they originated the baggy shorts as a result of Rose's request. Even rapper Ice Cube described his recollection of them as the originators.

== See also ==
- Duke-Michigan rivalry
- List of basketball films
