= Michigan Wolverines men's basketball =

NCAA Division I basketball program

2026–27 Michigan Wolverines men's basketball team
- University: University of Michigan
- First season: 1908–09; 118 years ago
- Athletic director: Warde Manuel
- Head coach: Mike Boynton; 1st season, 3–2 (.600)
- Location: Ann Arbor, Michigan
- Arena: Crisler Center (capacity: 12,707)
- NCAA division: Division I
- Conference: Big Ten
- Nickname: Wolverines
- Colors: Maize and blue
- Student section: Maize Rage
- All-time record: 1,770–1,131 (.610)
- NCAA tournament record: 74–31 (.705)

NCAA Division I tournament champions
- 1989, 2026
Other NCAA Division I tournament results
Runner-up	1965, 1976, 1992*, 1993*, 2013, 2018
Final Four	1964, 1965, 1976, 1989, 1992*, 1993*, 2013, 2018, 2026
Elite Eight	1948, 1964, 1965, 1966, 1974, 1976, 1977, 1989, 1992, 1993*, 1994, 2013, 2014, 2018, 2021, 2026
Sweet Sixteen	1964, 1965, 1966, 1974, 1976, 1977, 1988, 1989, 1992, 1993*, 1994, 2013, 2014, 2017, 2018, 2019, 2021, 2022, 2025, 2026
Appearances	1948, 1964, 1965, 1966, 1974, 1975, 1976, 1977, 1985, 1986, 1987, 1988, 1989, 1990, 1992, 1993*, 1994, 1995, 1996*, 1998*, 2009, 2011, 2012, 2013, 2014, 2016, 2017, 2018, 2019, 2021, 2022, 2025, 2026

NIT champions
- 1984, 1997*, 2004

Conference tournament champions
- Big Ten: 1998*, 2017, 2018, 2025

Conference regular-season champions
- Big Ten: 1921, 1926, 1927, 1929, 1948, 1964, 1965, 1966, 1974, 1977, 1985, 1986, 2012, 2014, 2021, 2026

Uniforms
Home	Away
- * vacated by NCAA

The Michigan Wolverines men's basketball team is the intercollegiate men's basketball program representing the University of Michigan. The school competes in the Big Ten Conference in Division I of the National Collegiate Athletic Association (NCAA), and play their home games at Crisler Center in Ann Arbor, Michigan. The Wolverines have won two NCAA Championships, three National Invitation Tournaments (NIT), 16 Big Ten regular season titles and four Big Ten tournaments. One NIT title and one Big Ten tournament were later vacated by the NCAA due to sanctions.

Michigan has had 36 All-Americans (1st, 2nd or 3rd team), on 49 total selections. Nine of these have been consensus first-team All-Americans, which are Cazzie Russell (twice), Rickey Green, Gary Grant, Chris Webber, Trey Burke, Yaxel Lendeborg, as well as Harry Kipke, Richard Doyle and Bennie Oosterbaan (twice), who were retroactively selected by the Helms Athletic Foundation. Twelve players have been honored as All-Americans at least twice, including Russell as the only three-time All-American.

Eighty-one players have been drafted into the National Basketball Association (NBA); thirty-five of those were first round draft picks, including both Cazzie Russell and Chris Webber who were selected first overall. The 1990 NBA draft, in which Rumeal Robinson was selected 10th, Loy Vaught was selected 13th, and Terry Mills was selected 16th made Michigan the third of only ten schools that have ever had three or more players selected in the first round of the same draft. Six have gone on to become NBA champions as players for a total of ten times and eight players have become NBA All-Stars a total of 18 times. Rudy Tomjanovich won both the 1994 and 1995 NBA championship as a coach. Glen Rice is one of only thirteen basketball players to have won a high school state championship, NCAA title and NBA championship.

During the 1990s Michigan endured an NCAA violations scandal, described as involving one of the largest amounts of illicit money in NCAA history, when Ed Martin loaned four players a reported total of $616,000. Due to sanctions, records starting in the 1992 Final Four, the 1992–93 season, and the 1995–96 season through the 1998–99 season were vacated by the NCAA. Throughout this article, asterisks denote awards, records and honors that have been vacated.

== By the numbers ==
- All-time wins – 1,770*
- All-time winning percentage – .610*
- NCAA National Championships – 2
- NCAA Final Fours – 9*
- NCAA Elite Eights – 16*
- NCAA Sweet Sixteens – 20*
- NCAA tournament appearances – 33*
- NCAA tournament wins – 74*
- No. 1 seeds in NCAA tournament – 4*
- Conference regular season championships – 16
- Conference tournament championships – 4*
- 30+ win seasons – 6*
- 20+ win seasons – 32*
- Weeks ranked No. 1 in AP poll – 24

* Includes vacated results and accomplishments.

== History ==
=== Early years (1908–19) ===
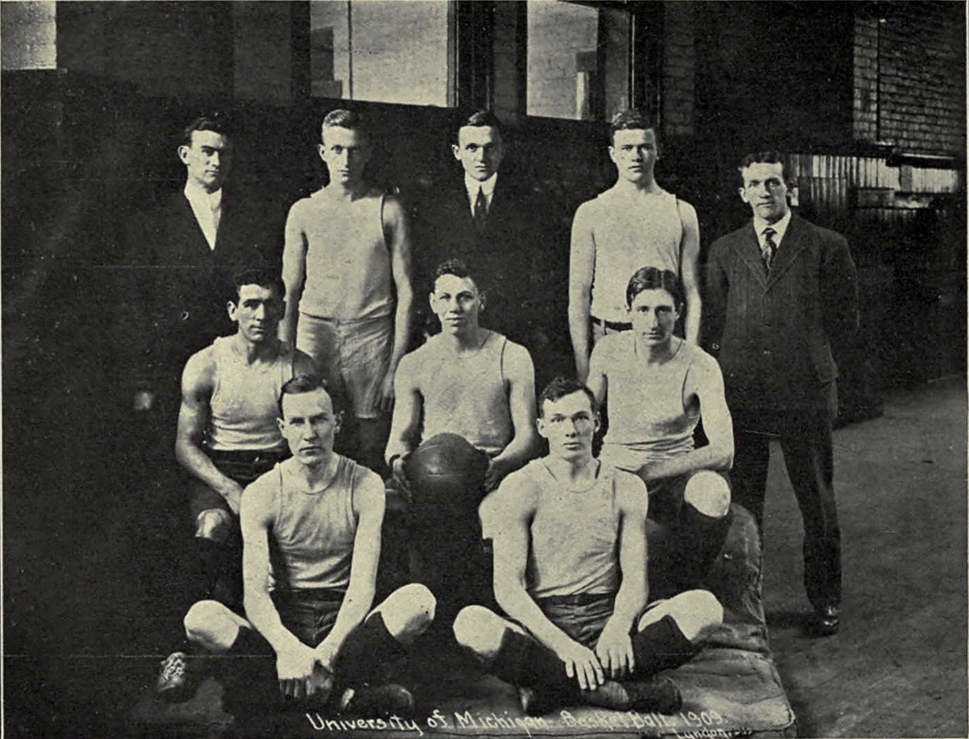
1909 Michigan basketball team

As a result of public and alumni demand for a basketball team, Michigan fielded a team of members of the then-current student body and achieved a 1–4 record for the 1908–09 season. However, after three years of demanding a basketball program, the student body did not attend the games and the program was terminated due to low attendance. Basketball returned in 1917 in what was considered the inaugural season of varsity basketball. The team was coached by Elmer Mitchell who instituted the intramural sports program at Michigan. The team finished 6–12 overall (0–10, Big Ten). The following year Mitchell led the team to a 16–8 (5–5) record.

=== Mather era (1919–28) ===
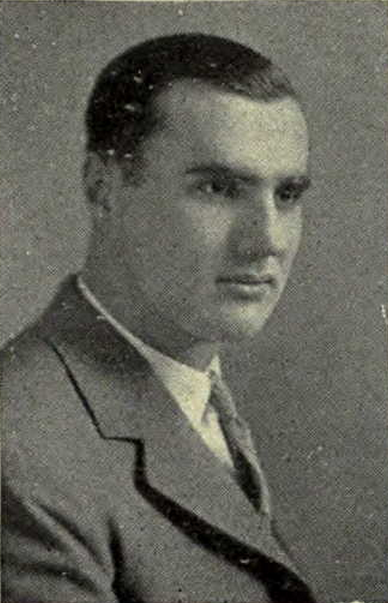
Richard Doyle, Michigan's First All-American basketball player

E. J. Mather coached the team to three Big Ten titles in his nine seasons as coach. After inheriting Mitchell's team, which he led to a 10–13 overall (3–9, Big Ten) record during the 1919–20 season, he led the team to an 18–4 overall (8–4, Big Ten) record during the 1920–21 season. This 1921 team won its first eight and last eight games to tie the Wisconsin Badgers and Purdue Boilermakers for the Big Ten title. The team won back-to-back championships in 1925–26 and 1926–27. The 1926 squad, which was captained by Richard Doyle who became the team's first All-American, tied with Purdue, the Iowa Hawkeyes and Indiana Hoosiers for the conference championship. The 1927 team had a new All-American, Bennie Oosterbaan, and won the school's first back-to-back championships and first outright championship with a 14–3 overall (10–2, Big Ten) record. Mather died after a lengthy battle with cancer in August 1928.

=== Veenker era (1928–31) ===
George F. Veenker compiled the highest overall and highest Big Ten winning percentages of any coach in school history during his three years as coach. He earned 1st(tied), 3rd and 2nd(tied) finishes during his three seasons, which included the 1928–29 conference championship. During Veenker's first season his team compiled a 13–3 overall (10–2, Big Ten) record to win the conference, and Veenker continues to be the only coach in school history to win a conference championship in his first season. The championship team, which finished tied with Wisconsin, was captained by the school's third All-American Ernie McCoy. Veenker resigned to become the Iowa State Cyclones football head coach.

=== Cappon era (1931–38) ===
Franklin Cappon had a long history of association with Michigan athletics starting with his service as a four-time letterman in football and basketball from 1919 to 1923. In 1928, he became assistant football and basketball coach and in 1929 he served as Fielding H. Yost's assistant Athletic Director. Although the highlight of Cappon's tenure as coach was a 16–4 (9–3) third place 1936–37 Big Ten finish, he coached John Townsend who in his 1937–38 senior season became last All-American for at least 10 years. The team finished third in two other seasons with less impressive records of 10–8 overall (8–4, Big Ten) in 1932–33 and 15–5 overall (7–5, Big Ten) 1935–36, and Cappon's overall record was 78–57 overall (44–40, Big Ten). A notable captain during the Cappon era was 1933–34 captain Ted Petoskey, a two-time football All-American end and eventual Major League Baseball player.

=== Oosterbaan era (1938–46) ===
In 1938 Michigan coaching duties were assumed by one of its greatest athletes. Bennie Oosterbaan had been an All-American in both football and basketball and held various coaching positions at Michigan in both of those sports as well as baseball. In basketball, he implemented a fast-paced attack as coach, and his teams' best overall record was 13–7 in 1939–40. That season he tied with his final season for his best Big Ten record at 6–6. He resigned after eight seasons to concentrate on his football coaching duties.

=== Cowles era (1946–48) ===
Under Ozzie Cowles, during the 1947–48 season, Michigan ended the longest (19 years) consecutive year period without a conference championship in school history. They also became the first contestants in the NCAA Division I men's basketball tournament during Cowles second of two seasons. The 1947–48 team posted a 16–6 overall (10–2, Big Ten) record. This team also posted the first undefeated home performance in school history with a 9–0 overall (6–0, Big Ten) record.

=== McCoy era (1948–52) ===
Ernie McCoy became the second former All-American Wolverine player to coach the team. Like Oosterbaan before him, he became a football and baseball coach at Michigan. He also served as assistant Athletic Director under Fritz Crisler. During his four seasons as basketball coach, Michigan's best finish was during the 1948–49 season when they finished 15–6 overall (7–5, Big Ten) and earned a third place Big Ten Conference finish. He coached Michigan's first All-Big Ten basketball players that season in Pete Elliot and captain Bob Harrison who were both selected to the first team. Harrison returned the following season as the first repeat first-team All-Big Ten basketball player and Elliot was a second-team honoree. McCoy served as a football scout at the same time.

=== Perigo era (1952–60) ===
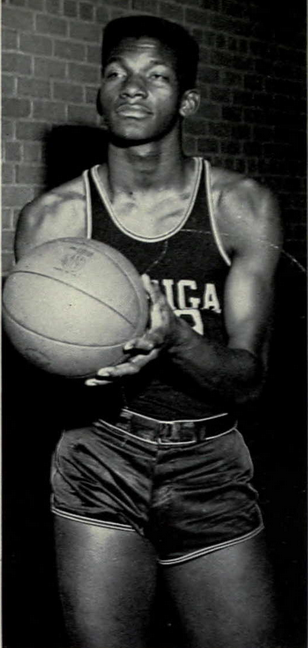
M. C. Burton

Bill Perigo took over the Michigan coaching job after having served three seasons as Western Michigan basketball coach. Despite previous success as a conference basketball champion coach at Western and subsequent success as a Michigan High School Athletic Association (MHSAA) champion basketball coach, his Michigan teams endured several mediocre seasons. His best Big Ten records came in 1956–57 and 1958–59 when his teams compiled 8–6 conference records. The latter team was tied for second in the conference and was 15–7 overall (8–6, Big Ten). It also had Perigo's only first-team All-Big Ten athlete in M. C. Burton. Team captain and two-time football consensus All-American Ron Kramer was third-team All-Big Ten in 1957 after being second-team All-Big Ten in both 1955 and 1956.

=== Strack era (1960–68) ===
Dave Strack, a former team 1945–46 captain, had become the freshman basketball team coach in 1948 and later had become a variety assistant to Perigo. He led the team to three consecutive Big Ten Championships from 1963 to 1966 and a third-place finish in the 1964 NCAA tournament. During 1964–65 the team compiled a 24–4 overall (13–1, Big Ten) record while completing an undefeated 11–0 overall (7–0, Big Ten) home season and was the national runner-up, falling to John Wooden's UCLA in the 1965 championship game. Strack earned United Press International (UPI) National Coach of the Year honors. The team ended the season listed number one in both the UPI and Associated Press (AP) national rankings. He recruited All-Americans Russell and Buntin to anchor his mid-1960s teams. Tomjanovich also became a Wolverine at the end of Strack's career and became second team All-Big Ten in 1968 subsequent later stardom. The 1964 team, which went 23–5 overall (11–3, Big Ten), tied with Ohio State with sophomore Russell and junior Buntin. In 1965, Buntin became the first Wolverine to be drafted by the NBA. In 1966, Russell led the team to its third straight conference championship and NCAA selection on his way to National Player of the Year honors.

=== Orr era (1968–80) ===
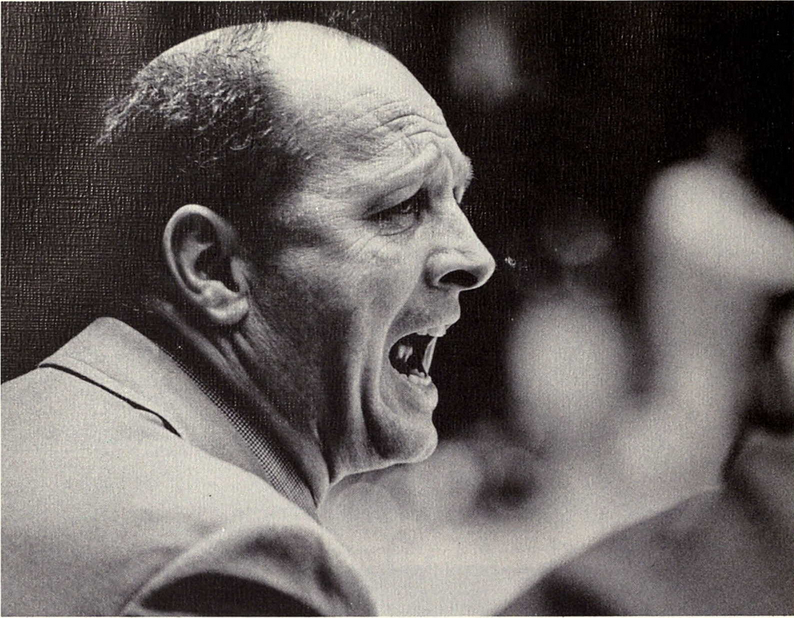
Johnny Orr

In Johnny Orr's twelve seasons, he twice (1973–74 and 1976–77) earned Big Ten Coach of the Year honors with Big Ten championships. His teams earned four consecutive NCAA selections from 1974 to 1977. The 25–7 overall (14–4, Big Ten) 1976 team lost to an undefeated Indiana team in the NCAA championship game and Orr earned National Association of Basketball Coaches Coach of the Year honors that season. The 26–4 overall (16–2, Big Ten) 1977 team finished first in both the AP and UPI national rankings, and Orr won Basketball Weekly National Coach of the Year honors. During Orr's tenure, six players earned a total of seven All-American recognitions, which is the most of any Michigan coach. Steve Grote became Michigan's only three-time first-team Academic All-American from 1975 to 1977 and with a second team All Big Ten as well as three honorable mentions was the first four-time All-Big Ten honoree.

=== Frieder era (1980–89) ===
Bill Frieder, who had been an assistant coach for seven years, took over from Orr in 1980. He coached the school's first post-season basketball champions during the 1983–84 season and the following two teams were back-to-back conference champions. The 1983–84 team compiled a 24–9 overall (11–7, Big Ten) record on their way to a NIT championship victory over Notre Dame. The 1984–85 team went 26–4 overall (16–2, Big Ten), which earned Frieder Big Ten and AP National Coach of the Year honors. The 1985–86 team, which finished 28–5 overall (14–4, Big Ten), started the season with 16 victories to make a total of 33 consecutive regular season victories. Frieder earned five of Michigan's six consecutive NCAA berths from 1985 to 1990, currently the longest streak in program history. Roy Tarpley led the 1985 team as Big Ten MVP. After the 1988–89 season, Frieder accepted the head coach's job at Arizona State, but wanted to remain at Michigan for the NCAA tournament. However, when Frieder told athletic director Bo Schembechler of his intentions, Schembechler ordered him to leave immediately, telling him, "I don't want someone from Arizona State coaching the Michigan team. A Michigan man is going to coach Michigan."

=== Fisher era (1989–97) ===
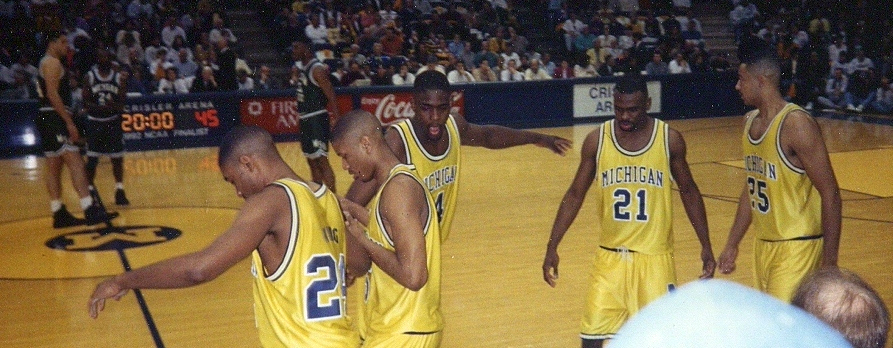
Michigan's Fab Five (left to right) Jimmy King, Jalen Rose, Webber, Ray Jackson and Juwan Howard

Frieder's top assistant, Steve Fisher, was named interim coach immediately before the 1989 NCAA Division I men's basketball tournament and led the team to six straight victories and the championship. Following the victory, Michigan dropped the "interim" tag from Fisher's title. Two years later, Fisher signed the famous recruiting class known as the Fab Five (Chris Webber, Juwan Howard, Jalen Rose, Jimmy King and Ray Jackson). When the five highly rated freshman joined the team in 1991, the Fab Five immediately changed traditional college basketball culture with their unique style and attitude. The players also changed basketball fashion by wearing extra large baggy shorts, black socks, and wearing their baseball hats backward, which changed how future players dressed. He would take these players to the NCAA championship game as Freshmen and Sophomores. Fisher also won the 1997 NIT tournament with a team that compiled a 25–9 overall (11–5) record. Many of Fisher's and the basketball team's accomplishments were tarnished by significant NCAA sanctions. He left the job due to the University of Michigan basketball scandal.

=== Ellerbe era (1997–2001) ===
Brian Ellerbe assumed the title of interim coach less than five months after becoming an assistant coach. He was named full-time coach following the 25–9 (11–5) 1997–98 season in which he led the team to victories over Iowa, Minnesota and Purdue to capture the Big Ten Conference men's basketball tournament championship. His subsequent teams never finished better than seventh in the conference.

=== Amaker era (2001–07) ===
Tommy Amaker inherited a team that imposed sanctions on itself after his first year at the helm of the program. Nonetheless, he coached the team to the postseason three times including both an NIT championship in 2004 and a runner-up finish in 2006. During the 2005–06, when the team compiled a 22–11 overall (8–8, Big Ten) record, he led them to their first national ranking in eight years when they reached No. 20 in the AP poll. Despite his successes, the team never won a Big Ten Championship and never made the NCAA tournament, which led to his firing after six seasons.

=== Beilein era (2007–19) ===
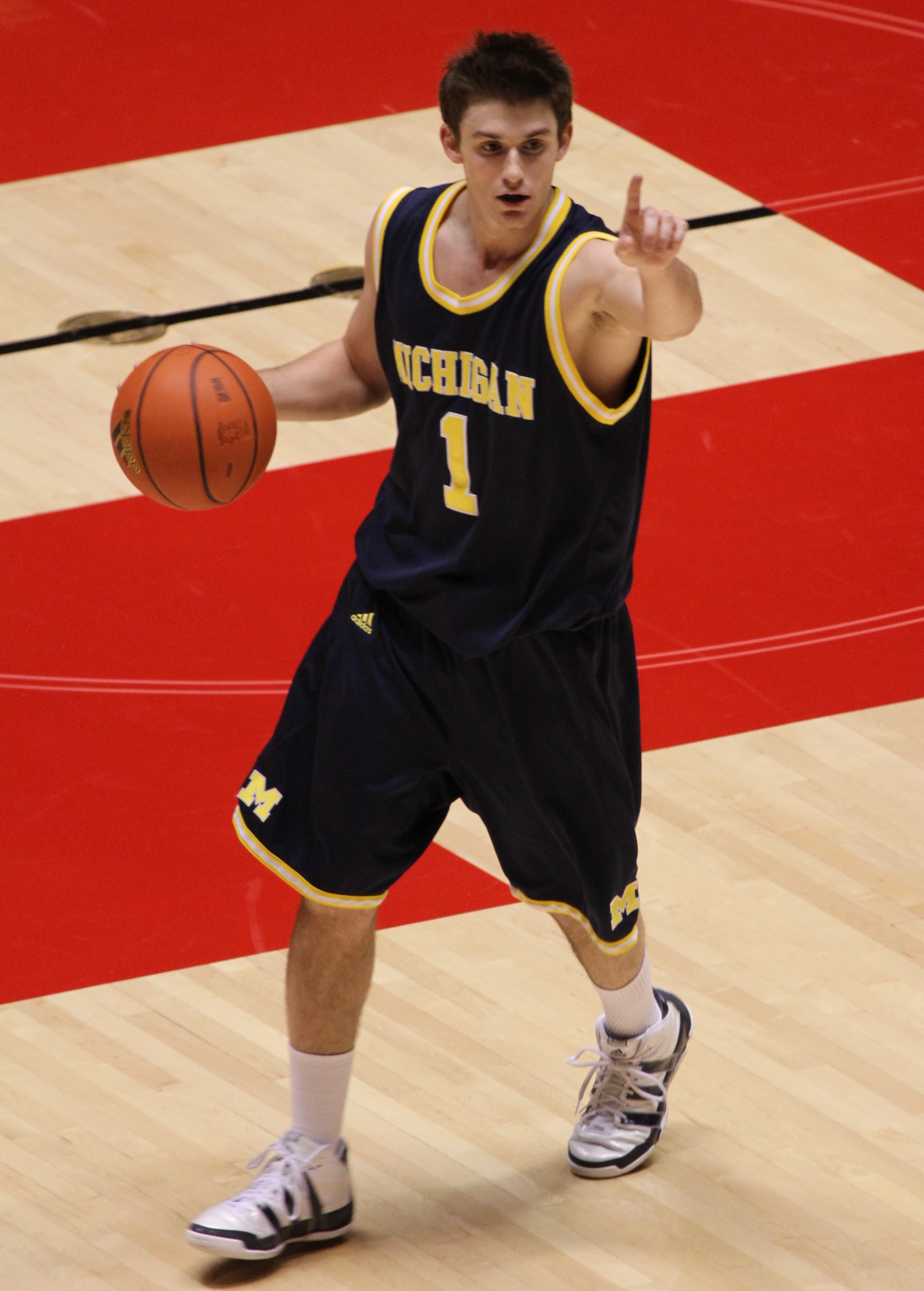
Stu Douglass, 2009

John Beilein's 10–22 overall (5–13 Big Ten) in his inaugural season featured the second most losses in Michigan basketball history. The Wolverines improved in Beilein's second season and posted impressive non-conference victories over top-five ranked opponents UCLA and Duke. Beilein led Michigan to the 2009 NCAA tournament, its first appearance since 1998 and the first that was not vacated since 1995. After upsetting Clemson in the first round, the Wolverines were eliminated by Oklahoma in the round of 32 by a final score of 73–63.

Following a disappointing 15–17 season in 2009–10, the Wolverines bounced back to return to the NCAA tournament in 2011, advancing to the round of 32 before losing to top-seeded Duke, 73–71. The 2010–11 Wolverines, who swept rival Michigan State for the first time since 1997, finished the season 21–14. In the 2011–12 season, Michigan split the season series between Ohio State and Michigan State, and was the co-Big Ten champions along with the Buckeyes and Spartans. It was the program's first Big Ten title since 1986. The Wolverines finished the season 24–10 and 13–5 in conference play, losing in the opening round of the 2012 NCAA tournament.

The 2012–13 Michigan team earned a No. 1 ranking in the AP poll on January 28, 2013, marking the first time since November 30, 1992 that Michigan held that position. The team also made program history for the best season start, at 21–2. On March 31, The Wolverines defeated Florida by a score of 79–59 to make their first Final Four appearance since the 1992–93 season. The Wolverines then defeated Syracuse by a score of 61–56 in the Final Four. In the 2013 NCAA tournament national championship game, the Wolverines lost against Louisville by the score of 82–76. On February 20, 2018, NCAA confirmed and upheld penalties against Louisville for "arranging striptease dances and sex acts for prospects, student-athletes and others." Louisville had to vacate its 2013 national championship, but the NCAA does not retroactively award vacated championships to default winners.

The 2013–14 team had another strong season, winning Michigan's first outright Big Ten championship since 1986 and advancing to the Elite Eight of the 2014 NCAA tournament, where it lost to Kentucky 75–72. With the departure of several key players to NBA draft, as well as injuries to Caris LeVert and Derrick Walton, the 2014–15 team ended the season with a 16–16 record and a quarterfinals appearance at the Big Ten tournament, but did not make the 2015 NCAA tournament. Despite several injuries before and during the season, the 2015–16 team compiled a 23–13 record and made it to the semifinals of the Big Ten tournament. The team also qualified as a First Four team for the 2016 NCAA tournament, but eventually lost in the round of 64.

During the 2016–17 season, Beilein became the winningest coach in school history, passing Johnny Orr with his 210th win on March 9, with a 75–55 win over Illinois in the opening round of the 2017 Big Ten tournament. Michigan went on to win the tournament, its first since the vacated 1998 title, winning four games in four days as the No. 8 seed and capping it off with a 71–56 championship victory over Wisconsin. It was the first time that a No. 8 seed had won the Big Ten tournament. Michigan made the 2017 NCAA tournament as a No. 7 seed, defeating Oklahoma State and Louisville to advance to the Sweet Sixteen. Michigan went on to lose to Oregon in the round and finished the season with a 26-12 record.

During the 2017–18 season, Beilein's Wolverines again won four games in four days to win back-to-back Big Ten tournament championships for the first time in school history. The team went on to win the West regional title and advance to the Final Four following its win over Florida State, 58–54. The win improved the team's record to 32–7, marking a new school record for victories. Following a Final Four victory over a rising Loyola-Chicago team, Michigan moved on to face Villanova in the 2018 NCAA tournament national championship game. The Wolverines fell short by a score of 79–62, and this brought Michigan's record in a national championship game to 1–6, the worst record among teams that have previously won a title.

The 2018–19 team started the season on the best run in program history, winning their first 17 games before losing to Wisconsin on the road. The Wolverines finished the regular season third in the Big Ten and earned a No. 2 seed in the 2019 NCAA tournament, despite losing three starters from the previous season's team. The team made it to the Sweet Sixteen of the NCAA tournament for a third straight season before losing to No. 3 seed Texas Tech.

On May 13, 2019, in a surprising move, Beilein signed a five-year contract to become the head coach of the Cleveland Cavaliers. Beilein led Michigan to a 278–150 record with nine NCAA tournament appearances, including two finishes as the national runner-up. Beilein advocated for a system similar to college football, where a committed player needed to stay in school for at least three years. It was speculated that the rise of "one-and-done" and early NBA Draft entries, which resulted in a trend of more time spent on recruiting and higher turnover of players, contributed to Beilein's decision to depart from college basketball. Beilein's departure from Michigan was widely regarded as a loss for college basketball.

=== Howard era (2019–2024) ===
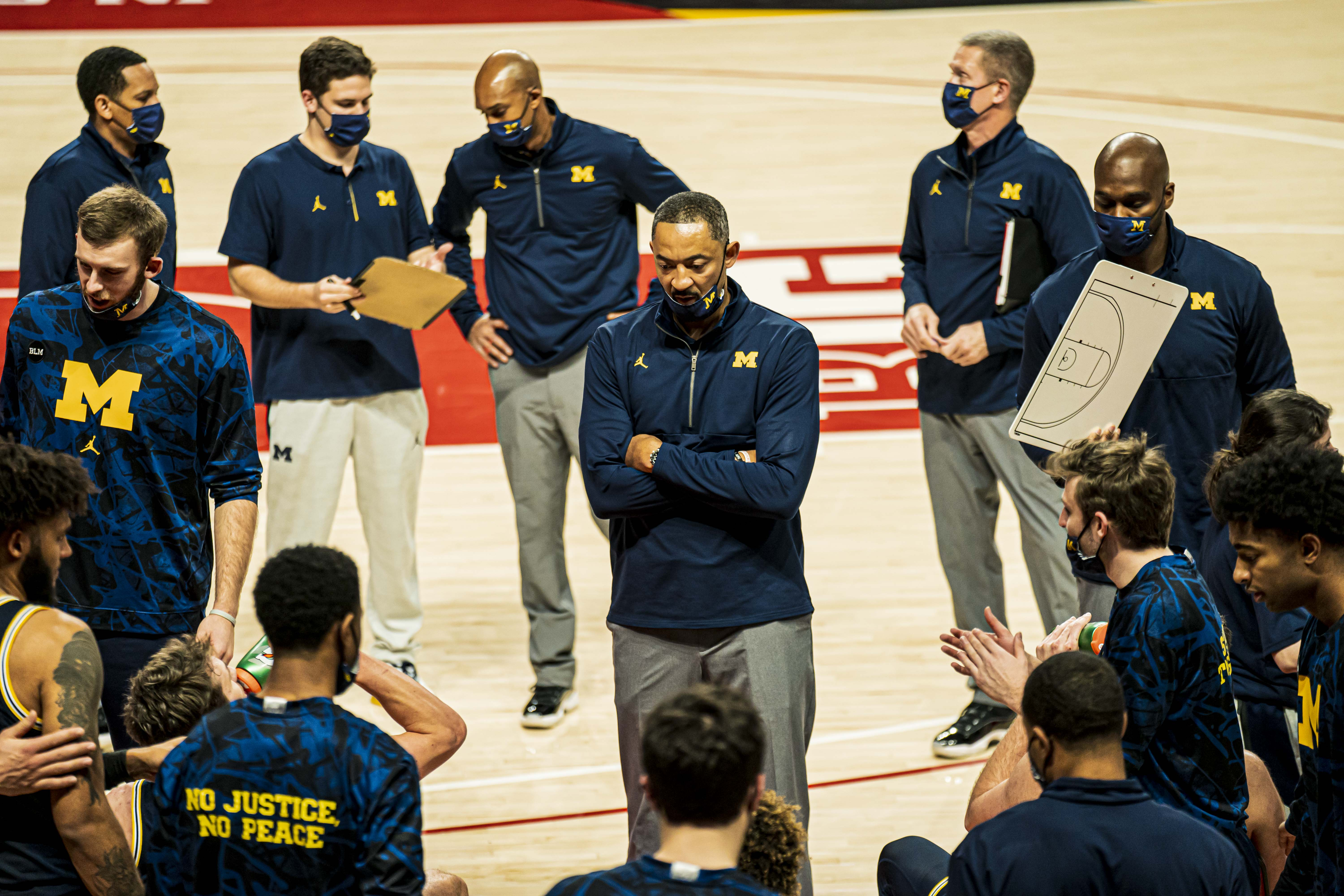
Juwan Howard during a game at Xfinity Center in 2020

On May 22, 2019, Fab Five member Juwan Howard was named the head basketball coach of the Wolverines, agreeing on a five-year contract. Despite losing three of their leading scorers from the 2018–19 team to the NBA draft, Howard led an unranked Wolverines to a 7–0 start, including back-to-back wins over No. 6 UNC, 73–64, and No. 8 Gonzaga, 82–64, capturing the Battle 4 Atlantis tournament title. Following the strong performance, Michigan jumped from unranked to No. 4 in the AP poll, becoming only the second team after the 1989–90 Kansas Jayhawks to achieve the feat in the 70-year history of the poll. In their first Big Ten game under Howard, the Wolverines defeated Iowa 103–91 and scored their most points in a Big Ten game since 1998 (112 against Indiana). They achieved the No. 9 seed in the 2020 Big Ten tournament, but their first game, against No. 8 seed Rutgers, was cancelled due to the COVID-19 pandemic.

On March 4, 2021, the 2020–21 Wolverines clinched the regular season Big Ten title with a 69–50 victory over instate rival Michigan State. Michigan ended the regular season with a 23–5 overall record and a 14–3 conference record (.823 conference winning percentage). Michigan's Big Ten regular season championship was their first since 2014. The Wolverines received an at-large bid to the 2021 NCAA tournament as the No. 1 seed in the East region, where they defeated No. 16 Texas Southern and No. 8 LSU to advance to their fourth straight Sweet Sixteen. They then defeated No. 4 Florida State before being upset by No. 11 UCLA in the Elite Eight.

The 2021–22 Wolverines finished the regular season with a 17–13 overall record (11–9 Big Ten) and lost their first game of the Big Ten tournament to Indiana. Michigan managed to make the 2022 NCAA tournament as a No. 11 seed, beating No. 6 Colorado State and No. 3 Tennessee to advance to the Sweet Sixteen for a fifth consecutive season. In the round Michigan lost to Villanova to end their tournament.

In each of the following two seasons, the Wolverines failed to make the NCAA tournament with Howard. It was the first time Michigan did not make the NCAA tournament in back-to-back years since the 2007–08 team. On March 15, 2024, after losing a program record 24 games, the university announced it was parting ways with Howard after five years.

=== May era (2024–2026) ===
On March 23, 2024, Dusty May was named the head basketball coach at the University of Michigan. In his first month, he led the 2024–25 Wolverines to being the Fort Myers Tip-Off champions, and ranked inside the top 15 of the AP poll for the first time since November 2021. Michigan finished the regular season tied for second place at 14–6 in the conference and earned the No. 3 seed in the 2025 Big Ten tournament. On March 16, the Wolverines won the Big Ten tournament against Wisconsin, their first tournament title since 2018. May became the first officially recognized conference coach to win the Big Ten tournament title in their first season, with the only other being Brian Ellerbe in Michigan's first win in 1998; though that season was later vacated by the NCAA. May also won the most total games and conference games in program history for a first-year head coach. Michigan received an automatic bid to the 2025 NCAA tournament as the No. 5 seed in the South Region. On March 20, the Wolverines defeated No. 12 seed UC San Diego, 68–65, in the First Round. With 26 wins, May became the winningest first-year head coach in program history. On March 22, Michigan defeated No. 4 seed Texas A&M in the Second Round 91–79, winning a fifth consecutive postseason game. No team in NCAA history has ever lost as many games the season before and advanced to the Sweet Sixteen the next year (since introduced in 1975). On March 28, Michigan lost to the No. 1 overall seed Auburn in the regional semifinal, 65–78. The Wolverines finished the year 27–10, an increase of 19 wins from the previous season.

In May's second season, the 2025–26 Wolverines won the 2025 Players Era Festival Championship in late November. In the tournament, No. 7 Michigan defeated San Diego State by 40 points, No. 21 Auburn by 30 points and No. 12 Gonzaga by 40 points in the championship game. The win against Gonzaga marked the highest margin of victory against an AP ranked opponent in program history, and was the first time in NCAA history that any team outscored AP ranked opponents by 30 or more points in consecutive games. On December 8, Michigan was ranked No. 1 in the Coaches poll for the first time since the Fab Five led 1992–93 Wolverines, and on February 16, Michigan moved to No. 1 in the AP poll for the first time since the 2012–13 Wolverines. Michigan would improve to a program-record 25–1 before a second loss. On February 24, Michigan clinched a share of the 2026 Big Ten regular season championship with a win against Minnesota, and secured the outright Big Ten championship against No. 10 Illinois on February 27. It was the Wolverines first since the 2021 Big Ten regular season championship. Michigan finished the regular season 29–2 and 19–1 in the conference. The 29 regular season wins are a program record and the 19 conference wins set a Big Ten record, surpassing the program record of 16 wins set by the 1976–77 and 1984–85 Wolverines, and the Big Ten record set by the 1974–75 and 1975–76 Indiana Hoosiers (18–0). Michigan is the only Big Ten team to have ever won all ten conference road games, and the first to finish undefeated on the road since the 1975–76 Indiana Hoosiers.

In the 2026 NCAA tournament, Michigan received the 1-seed in the Midwest region. The Wolverines defeated 16-seed Howard in the first round, 101–80. In the second round, Michigan defeated 9-seed Saint Louis, 95–72. In the Sweet Sixteen, Michigan defeated 4-seed No. 18 Alabama, 90–77, winning a 34th game of the season and surpassing the program-record of 33 wins set by John Beilein and the 2017–18 Wolverines. In the Elite Eight, Michigan defeated 6-seed No. 23 Tennessee, 95–62, in the largest margin of victory by any team in a regional final since the Wolverines in 1989. In the Final Four, Michigan defeated 1-seed No. 2 Arizona of the West Region, 91–73. Their 18-point win is tied for the largest margin of victory between 1-seeds in an NCAA tournament game since seeding began in 1979. Michigan became the first team in NCAA tournament history to score at least 90 points in five consecutive games in a single tournament. They won by double-digits and made at least ten threes in each game. On April 6, Michigan defeated 2-seed No. 7 UConn of the East region in the national championship game, 69–63. Built around the nation's top ranked transfer portal class, Michigan also became the first team in NCAA history to win a national championship with a starting lineup composed entirely of transfer players. Michigan set a single-season point differential of +713, which is a Big Ten record. It was the program's first national title since 1989 and the first for the Big Ten Conference since 2000. Michigan finished with a program-record, defeating a 13th AP ranked opponent this season and officially set the program single-season record with an NCAA-leading 37th win, which tied the Big Ten record set by the 2004–05 Illinois Fighting Illini. May's 64 wins is tied for the most in NCAA Division I history in the first two seasons at a new school and the 29 win improvement over the 2023–24 Wolverines is the largest two-season differential since the NCAA tournament began. The improvement made Michigan the first program to go from 10 or fewer wins to a national championship in two seasons since the 1978–79 Michigan State Spartans.

Following the season, on June 23, 2026, May departed to become the head coach for the Dallas Mavericks.

=== Boynton era (2026–present) ===
After serving two seasons under May, Mike Boynton signed a two-year deal to serve as head basketball coach on July 10, 2026.

== Championships ==
=== NCAA National Championships ===
Year	Coach	Opponent	Score	Site	Overall record	Big Ten record
1989	Steve Fisher	Seton Hall	80–79 (OT)	Seattle	30–7	12–6
2026	Dusty May	UConn	69–63	Indianapolis	37–3	19–1
National Championships						2

1989 NCAA tournament Results
Round	Opponent	Score
First Round	No. 14 Xavier	92–87
Second Round	No. 11 South Alabama	91–82
Sweet Sixteen	No. 2 North Carolina	92–87
Elite Eight	No. 5 Virginia	102–65
Final Four	No. 1 Illinois	83–81
Championship	No. 3 Seton Hall	80–79^{OT}

2026 NCAA tournament Results
Round	Opponent	Score
First Round	No. 16 Howard	101–80
Second Round	No. 9 Saint Louis	95–72
Sweet Sixteen	No. 4 Alabama	90–77
Elite Eight	No. 6 Tennessee	95–62
Final Four	No. 1 Arizona	91–73
Championship	No. 2 UConn	69–63

=== Big Ten regular season championships ===
Year	Coach	Overall record	Conference record
1921+	E. J. Mather	18–4	8–4
1926+	E. J. Mather	12–5	8–4
1927	E. J. Mather	14–3	10–2
1929+	George Veenker	13–3	10–2
1948	Ozzie Cowles	16–6	10–2
1964+	Dave Strack	23–5	11–3
1965	Dave Strack	24–4	13–1
1966	Dave Strack	18–8	11–3
1974+	Johnny Orr	22–5	12–2
1977	Johnny Orr	26–4	16–2
1985	Bill Frieder	26–4	16–2
1986	Bill Frieder	28–5	14–4
2012+	John Beilein	24–10	13–5
2014	John Beilein	28–9	15–3
2021	Juwan Howard	23–5	14–3
2026	Dusty May	37–3	19–1
Big Ten regular season championships			16

+ Conference co-champions

=== Big Ten tournament championships ===
Year	Coach	Opponent	Score	Site	Overall record	Big Ten record
1998*	Brian Ellerbe	Purdue	76–67	Chicago	25–9	11–5
2017	John Beilein	Wisconsin	71–56	Washington, D.C.	26–12	10–8
2018	John Beilein	Purdue	75–66	New York City	33–8	13–5
2025	Dusty May	Wisconsin	59–53	Indianapolis	27–10	14–6
Big Ten tournament championships						4

== Rivalries ==
- Michigan–Duke
- Michigan–Michigan State
- Michigan–Ohio State

=== Record against current Big Ten opponents ===
Opponent	Series record
Illinois	*86–96
Indiana	*68–110
Iowa	*101–68
Maryland	15–10
Michigan State	*106–92
Minnesota	*100–71
Nebraska	*24–5
Northwestern	*121–60
Ohio State	*87–108
Oregon	6–3
Penn State	*42–17
Purdue	*78–94
Rutgers	19–4
UCLA	7–12
USC	3–1
Washington	5–3
Wisconsin	*102–76
Total	*970–830

Totals through March 15, 2026.

== Fab Five ==
The Fab Five, the 1991 recruiting class of five freshman starters, were Chris Webber, Juwan Howard, Jalen Rose, Jimmy King, and Ray Jackson. They were notable for having gone to the championship game of the 1992 and 1993 NCAA Division I men's basketball tournament as freshmen and sophomores, for having started the trend of wearing baggy gym shorts, which was later popularized by Michael Jordan, and for wearing black athletic socks. Due to the issues found with Webber's eligibility in the Ed Martin scandal, the records from their 1992 Final Four appearance and the entire following season have been vacated. Although Webber was the only member of the Fab Five officially implicated with the scandal, the reputation of the whole group has been tarnished. Webber (1993), Howard (1994) and Rose (1992, 1994) were college basketball All-Americans. and both King (1995 3rd team and 1993 & 1994 honorable mention) and Jackson (1995 2nd team & 1994 honorable mention) achieved All-Big Ten honors. All but Jackson played in the NBA. They were the subject of Mitch Albom's book, Fab Five: Basketball, Trash Talk, the American Dream, which at one point was under development by Fox Television as a made-for-television movie. In March 2011 ESPN broadcast a documentary, Fab Five, that was the network's highest-rated in its history. Experts also note that the team's loud confidence and talking on the court was a way for young players to express themselves and change how the media viewed college athletes.

== Ed Martin scandal ==
During the University of Michigan basketball scandal the Big Ten Conference, National Collegiate Athletic Association, Federal Bureau of Investigation, Internal Revenue Service, and United States Department of Justice investigated the relationship between the University of Michigan, its men's basketball teams and basketball team booster Ed Martin. The program was punished for NCAA rules violations, principally involving payments booster Martin made to several players to launder money from an illegal gambling operation. It is one of the largest incidents involving payments to college athletes in American collegiate history. It was described as one of the three or four worst violations of NCAA bylaws in history up to that time by the NCAA infractions committee chairman and the largest athlete payment scandal ever by ESPN.

The case began when the investigation of an automobile rollover accident during Mateen Cleaves' 1996 Michigan Wolverines recruiting trip revealed a curious relationship between Martin and the team. Several Michigan basketball players were implicated over the next few years and by 1999 several were called before a federal grand jury. Four eventual professional basketball players (Chris Webber, Maurice Taylor, Robert Traylor and Louis Bullock) were discovered to have borrowed a total of $616,000 from Martin. During the investigation, Webber claimed not to have had any financial relationship with Martin. Eventually he confessed to having accepted some of the money he was charged with having borrowed. For his perjury during a federal grand jury investigation, he was both fined in the legal system and briefly suspended by National Basketball Association after performing public service.

In 2002, the university punished itself when it became apparent that its players were guilty by declaring itself ineligible for post season play immediately, returning post season play monetary rewards, vacating five seasons of games, removing commemorative banners, and placing itself on a two-year probation. The following year, the NCAA accepted these punishments, doubled both the probation period and the post-season ineligibility, penalized the school one scholarship for four seasons, and ordered disassociation from the four guilty players until 2012. The disassociation formally ended on May 8, 2013. The additional year of post-season ineligibility was overturned on appeal.

The punishment cost the 2002–03 team its post-season eligibility, cost past teams the 1997 National Invitation Tournament and the 1998 Big Ten tournament championships as well as 1992 and 1993 NCAA Division I men's basketball tournament Final Four recognition. It cost Traylor his MVP awards in the 1997 NIT and 1998 Big Ten tournament, as well as Bullock's standing as the school's third all-time leading scorer and all-time leader in 3-point field goals. Steve Fisher lost his job as Michigan head coach as a result of the scandal.

== Head coaching history and current staff ==
=== Personnel ===
==== Current coaching staff ====
Michigan Wolverines
Name	Position	Consecutive season(s) at Michigan in current position	Previous position
Mike Boynton	Head coach	1st	Michigan – Assistant coach (2024–2026)
Mike Martin	Associate head coach	1st	Brown – Head coach (2012–2026)
Akeem Miskdeen	Assistant coach / recruiting coordinator	3rd	Georgia – Assistant coach (2022–2024)
Kyle Church	Assistant coach / general manager	3rd	Florida Atlantic – Assistant coach (2018–2024)
Dylan Murphy	Assistant coach / offensive coordinator	1st	Osceola Magic – Head coach (2023–2026)
KT Harrell	Assistant coach	1st	Michigan – Director of basketball operations (2024–2026)
Brandon Gilbert	Special assistant	3rd	Florida Atlantic – Special assistant (2018–2024)
Buzzy Caruthers	Director of player development	1st	Ball State – Assistant coach (2024–2026)
Nick Szczechowski	Director of basketball operations	1st	Michigan – Head student manager (2024–2026)
Matt Aldred	Strength and conditioning coach	3rd	Furman – Strength and conditioning coach, assistant head coach (2018–2024)

==== Current record ====
		Overall		Conference		
Coach	Years	Record	Pct.	Record	Pct.	Note
Mike Boynton	2026–present	3–2	.600	0–0	–	

== Honored players and coaches ==
Below are lists of important players and coaches in the history of Michigan Wolverines men's basketball. It includes lists of major awards and retired numbers. The honors include: Helms Foundation Player of the Year, UPI Player of the Year, Sporting News Player of the Year, Naismith Trophy, Wooden Award, Associated Press Player of the Year, NABC Player of the Year, Oscar Robertson Trophy, NCAA tournament MOP, National Invitation tournament MVP, Big Ten tournament MVP, Chicago Tribune Silver Basketball, Big Ten Player of the Year, All-America, Wayman Tisdale Award, Bob Cousy Award, UPI Coach of the Year, Henry Iba Award, NABC Coach of the Year, AP Coach of the Year.

=== Retired numbers ===
The program has officially retired one number only:

Michigan Wolverines retired numbers
No.	Player	Pos.	Tenure	No. retired	Ref.
33	Cazzie Russell	SG / SF	1963–66	December 11, 1993	

=== Honored Jerseys ===
Jerseys honored but numbers still active:

Michigan Wolverines honored jerseys
No.	Player	Pos.	Tenure	Honored
3	Trey Burke	PG	2011–13	January 23, 2026
22	Bill Buntin	PF / C	1962–65	January 7, 2006
35	Phil Hubbard	PF / C	1975–79	January 11, 2004
41	Glen Rice	SF	1985–89	February 20, 2005
45	Rudy Tomjanovich	PF	1967–70	February 8, 2003

=== Awards and honors ===
National Player of the Year

- 1966 – Cazzie Russell (AP, USBWA, UPI, Helms, The Sporting News)
- 2013 – Trey Burke (AP, USBWA, NABC, Naismith, Wooden)

Wayman Tisdale Award

- 1992 – Chris Webber

Bob Cousy Award

- 2013 – Trey Burke

NCAA tournament MOP

- 1989 – Glen Rice
- 2026 – Elliot Cadeau

National Invitation Tournament MVP

- 1984 – Tim McCormick
- 1997 – Robert Traylor*
- 2004 – Daniel Horton

Big Ten tournament MVP

- 1998 – Robert Traylor*
- 2017 – Derrick Walton
- 2018 – Moritz Wagner
- 2025 – Vladislav Goldin

Chicago Tribune Silver Basketball

- 1965 – Cazzie Russell
- 1966 – Cazzie Russell
- 1974 – Campy Russell
- 1985 – Roy Tarpley
- 1988 – Gary Grant
- 1989 – Glen Rice

Big Ten Player of the Year

- 1985 – Roy Tarpley
- 1988 – Gary Grant
- 1989 – Glen Rice
- 2013 – Trey Burke
- 2014 – Nik Stauskas
- 2026 – Yaxel Lendeborg

Big Ten Freshman of the Year

- 1985 – Gary Grant
- 1992 – Chris Webber
- 1995 – Maurice Taylor
- 2000 – LaVell Blanchard
- 2003 – Daniel Horton
- 2012 – Trey Burke
- 2019 – Ignas Brazdeikis
- 2021 – Hunter Dickinson

Big Ten Defensive Player of the Year

- 1987 – Gary Grant
- 1988 – Gary Grant
- 2026 – Aday Mara

Big Ten Sixth Man of the Year

- 2018 – Duncan Robinson

All-Americans

- 1924 – Harry Kipke #
- 1926 – Richard Doyle #
- 1927–28 – Bennie Oosterbaan ##
- 1929 – Ernie McCoy
- 1929 – Joseph Truskowski
- 1937–38 – John Townsend
- 1948 – Pete Elliott
- 1957 – Ron Kramer
- 1964–65 – Bill Buntin
- 1964–66 – Cazzie Russell ##
- 1970 – Rudy Tomjanovich
- 1972 – Henry Wilmore
- 1974 – Campy Russell
- 1977 – Rickey Green #
- 1977 – Phil Hubbard
- 1985–86 – Roy Tarpley
- 1987–88 – Gary Grant #
- 1989 – Glen Rice
- 1990 – Rumeal Robinson
- 1993 – Chris Webber #
- 1994 – Juwan Howard
- 1994 – Jalen Rose
- 1998 – Robert Traylor
- 2013 – Trey Burke #
- 2014 – Nik Stauskas
- 2021 – Hunter Dickinson
- 2026 – Yaxel Lendeborg #

# (consensus)

National Coach of the Year

- 1965 – Dave Strack (UPI)
- 1976 – Johnny Orr (NABC, USBWA)
- 1977 – Johnny Orr (Basketball Weekly)
- 1985 – Bill Frieder (AP, Basketball Weekly)
- 1992 – Steve Fisher (Basketball Times)
- 2021 – Juwan Howard (AP, TSN, USBWA)
- 2026 – Dusty May (USBWA)

Big Ten Coach of the Year

- 1974 – Johnny Orr
- 1977 – Johnny Orr
- 1985 – Bill Frieder
- 2014 – John Beilein
- 2021 – Juwan Howard
- 2026 – Dusty May

=== Naismith Memorial Basketball Hall of Fame ===
Two former Wolverines have been inducted into the Naismith Memorial Basketball Hall of Fame.

Year	Player	Inducted as
2020	Rudy Tomjanovich	Coach
2021	Chris Webber	Player

=== National Collegiate Basketball Hall of Fame ===
Three Wolverines have been inducted into the National Collegiate Basketball Hall of Fame.

Year	Player	Inducted as
2011	Cazzie Russell	Player
2022	John Beilein	Coach
2026	Glen Rice	Player

== NBA draft picks and active alumni ==
=== First round NBA draft picks ===
Draft Year	Pick	Player	Selected by	Professional career
1965	3T	Bill Buntin	Detroit Pistons	1965–1966
1966	1	Cazzie Russell	New York Knicks	1966–1981
1970	2	Rudy Tomjanovich	San Diego Rockets	1970–1981
1974	8	Campy Russell	Cleveland Cavaliers	1974–1985
1977	16	Rickey Green	Golden State Warriors	1977–1992
1979	15	Phil Hubbard	Detroit Pistons	1979–1989
1981	19	Mike McGee	Los Angeles Lakers	1981–1992
1984	12	Tim McCormick	Cleveland Cavaliers	1984–1992
1986	7	Roy Tarpley	Dallas Mavericks	1986–2006
1988	15	Gary Grant	Seattle SuperSonics	1988–2002
1989	4	Glen Rice	Miami Heat	1989–2004
1990	10	Rumeal Robinson	Atlanta Hawks	1990–2002
1990	13	Loy Vaught	Los Angeles Clippers	1990–2001
1990	16	Terry Mills	Milwaukee Bucks	1990–2001
1993	1	Chris Webber	Orlando Magic	1993–2008
1994	5	Juwan Howard	Washington Bullets	1994–2013
1994	13	Jalen Rose	Denver Nuggets	1994–2007
1997	14	Maurice Taylor	Los Angeles Clippers	1997–2011
1998	6	Robert Traylor	Dallas Mavericks	1998–2011
2000	8	Jamal Crawford	Cleveland Cavaliers	2000–2020
2013	9	Trey Burke	Minnesota Timberwolves	2013–2022
2013	24	Tim Hardaway Jr.	New York Knicks	2013–present
2014	8	Nik Stauskas	Sacramento Kings	2014–2022
2014	21	Mitch McGary	Oklahoma City Thunder	2014–2016
2016	20	Caris LeVert	Indiana Pacers	2016–present
2017	17	D. J. Wilson	Milwaukee Bucks	2017–2024
2018	25	Moritz Wagner	Los Angeles Lakers	2018–present
2019	28	Jordan Poole	Golden State Warriors	2019–present
2021	8	Franz Wagner	Orlando Magic	2021–present
2023	11	Jett Howard	Orlando Magic	2023–present
2023	15	Kobe Bufkin	Atlanta Hawks	2023–present
2025	27	Danny Wolf	Brooklyn Nets	2025–present
2026	9	Morez Johnson Jr.	Dallas Mavericks	2026–present
2026	11	Yaxel Lendeborg	Golden State Warriors	2026–present
2026	12	Aday Mara	Oklahoma City Thunder	2026–present

=== Active alumni in the NBA ===
Updated as of October 2026.

==== Players ====
- Kobe Bufkin: Utah Jazz
- Moussa Diabaté: Charlotte Hornets
- Vladislav Goldin: Miami Heat
- Tim Hardaway Jr.: Miami Heat
- Jett Howard: Dallas Mavericks
- Morez Johnson Jr.: Dallas Mavericks
- Yaxel Lendeborg: Golden State Warriors
- Caris LeVert: Milwaukee Bucks
- Aday Mara: Oklahoma City Thunder
- Jordan Poole: New Orleans Pelicans
- Duncan Robinson: Detroit Pistons
- Franz Wagner: Orlando Magic
- Mo Wagner: Brooklyn Nets
- Danny Wolf: Brooklyn Nets

==== Coaches and front office ====
- Josh Bartelstein: Phoenix Suns
  - CEO
- Juwan Howard: Brooklyn Nets
  - Assistant coach
- Mark Hughes: Los Angeles Clippers
  - Vice president / assistant general manager
- Rob Pelinka: Los Angeles Lakers
  - General Manager
- Glen Rice: Miami Heat
  - Scout
- Campy Russell: Cleveland Cavaliers
  - Director of Alumni Relations

== Postseason ==
=== NCAA tournament results ===
The University of Michigan has an all-time 74–31* (67–27) record overall and 2–6* (2–4) championship game record in the NCAA tournaments in 33* (30) appearances. Glen Rice holds the NCAA single-tournament scoring record with 184 points in 1989. The 1992 Final Four and all 1993, 1996, & 1998 games have been vacated due to NCAA sanctions.

Year	Round	Opponent	Result
1948	Elite Eight; Regional third place	Holy Cross; Columbia	L 43–63; W 66–49
1964	Sweet Sixteen; Elite Eight; Final Four; National Third Place	Loyola-Chicago; Ohio; Duke; Kansas State	W 84–80; W 69–57; L 80–91; W 100–90
1965	Sweet Sixteen; Elite Eight; Final Four; National Championship	Dayton; Vanderbilt; Princeton; UCLA	W 98–71; W 87–85; W 93–76; L 80–91
1966	Sweet Sixteen; Elite Eight	Western Kentucky; Kentucky	W 80–79; L 77–84
1974	Sweet Sixteen; Elite Eight	Notre Dame; Marquette	W 77–68; L 70–72
1975	First Round	UCLA	L 91–103^{OT}
1976	First Round; Sweet Sixteen; Elite Eight; Final Four; National Championship	Wichita State; Notre Dame; Missouri; Rutgers; Indiana	W 74–73; W 80–76; W 95–88; W 86–70; L 68–86
1977	First Round; Sweet Sixteen; Elite Eight	Holy Cross; Detroit; Charlotte	W 92–81; W 86–81; L 68–75
1985	First Round; Second Round	Fairleigh Dickinson; Villanova	W 59–55; L 55–59
1986	First Round; Second Round	Akron; Iowa State	W 70–64; L 69–72
1987	First Round; Second Round	Navy; North Carolina	W 97–82; L 97–109
1988	First Round; Second Round; Sweet Sixteen	Boise State; Florida; North Carolina	W 63–58; W 108–85; L 69–78
1989	First Round; Second Round; Sweet Sixteen; Elite Eight; Final Four; National Championship	Xavier; South Alabama; North Carolina; Virginia; Illinois; Seton Hall	W 92–87; W 91–82; W 92–87; W 102–65; W 83–81; W 80–79^{OT}
1990	First Round; Second Round	Illinois State; Loyola Marymount	W 76–70; L 115–149
1992	First Round; Second Round; Sweet Sixteen; Elite Eight; Final Four; National Championship	Temple; East Tennessee State; Oklahoma State; Ohio State; Cincinnati; Duke	W 73–66; W 102–90; W 75–72; W 75–71; W 76–72; L 51–71
1993	First Round; Second Round; Sweet Sixteen; Elite Eight; Final Four; National Championship	Coastal Carolina; UCLA; George Washington; Temple; Kentucky; North Carolina	W 84–53; W 86–84^{OT} W 72–64; W 77–72; W 81–78^{OT} L 71–77
1994	First Round; Second Round; Sweet Sixteen; Elite Eight	Pepperdine; Texas; Maryland; Arkansas	W 78–74^{OT} W 84–79; W 78–71; L 68–76
1995	First Round	Western Kentucky	L 76–82^{OT}
1996	First Round	Texas	L 76–80
1998	First Round; Second Round	Davidson; UCLA	W 80–61; L 82–85
2009	First Round; Second Round	Clemson; Oklahoma	W 62–59; L 63–73
2011	Second Round; Third Round	Tennessee; Duke	W 75–45; L 71–73
2012	Second Round	Ohio	L 60–65
2013	Second Round; Third Round; Sweet Sixteen; Elite Eight; Final Four; National Championship	South Dakota State; VCU; Kansas; Florida; Syracuse; Louisville	W 71–56; W 78–53; W 87–85^{OT} W 79–59; W 61–56; L 76–82
2014	Second Round; Third Round; Sweet Sixteen; Elite Eight	Wofford; Texas; Tennessee; Kentucky	W 57–40; W 79–65; W 73–71; L 72–75
2016	First Four; First Round	Tulsa; Notre Dame	W 67–62; L 63–70
2017	First Round; Second Round; Sweet Sixteen	Oklahoma State; Louisville; Oregon	W 92–91; W 73–69; L 68–69
2018	First Round; Second Round; Sweet Sixteen; Elite Eight; Final Four; National Championship	Montana; Houston; Texas A&M; Florida State; Loyola-Chicago; Villanova	W 61–47; W 64–63; W 99–72; W 58–54; W 69–57; L 62–79
2019	First Round; Second Round; Sweet Sixteen	Montana; Florida; Texas Tech	W 74–55; W 64–49; L 44–63
2021	First Round; Second Round; Sweet Sixteen; Elite Eight	Texas Southern; LSU; Florida State; UCLA	W 82–66; W 86–78; W 76–58; L 49–51
2022	First Round; Second Round; Sweet Sixteen	Colorado State; Tennessee; Villanova	W 75–63; W 76–68; L 55–63
2025	First Round; Second Round; Sweet Sixteen	UC San Diego; Texas A&M; Auburn	W 68–65; W 91–79; L 65–78
2026	First Round; Second Round; Sweet Sixteen; Elite Eight; Final Four; National Championship	Howard; Saint Louis; Alabama; Tennessee; Arizona; UConn	W 101–80; W 95–72; W 90–77; W 95–62; W 91–73; W 69–63

=== NCAA tournament seeding history ===
The NCAA began seeding the NCAA Division I men's basketball tournament with the 1979 edition. The 64-team field started in 1985, which guaranteed that a championship team had to win six games.

Years →	'85	'86	'87	'88	'89	'90	'92	'93	'94	'95	'96	'98	'09	'11	'12	'13	'14	'16	'17	'18	'19	'21	'22	'25	'26
Seeds →	1	2	9	3	3	3	6	1	3	9	7	3	10	8	4	4	2	11	7	3	2	1	11	5	1

=== NCAA tournament round history ===
Round	Record	Most Recent Appearance
National Championship	2–6	2026
National Third Place	1–0	1964
Final Four	8–1	2026
Elite Eight	9–7	2026
Regional third place	1–0	1948
Sweet Sixteen	15–5	2026
Round of 32	16–8	2026
Round of 64	21–4	2026
First Four	1–0	2016

=== NIT results ===
In 11* (10) National Invitation Tournament appearances, Michigan is 26*–8 (21–8) overall all-time and 3*–1 (2–1) in the championship game. 17*–0 (15–0) at Crisler Arena and 8*–2 (6–2) at Madison Square Garden. The 1997 tournament was forfeited due to NCAA sanctions.

Year	Round	Opponent	Result
1971	First Round; Quarterfinals	Syracuse; Georgia Tech	W 86–76; L 70–78
1980	First Round; Second Round; Quarterfinals	Nebraska; UTEP; Virginia	W 76–69; W 75–65; L 68–79
1981	First Round; Second Round; Quarterfinals	Duquesne; Toledo; Syracuse	W 74–58; W 80–68; L 76–91
1984	First Round; Second Round; Quarterfinals; Semifinals; Final	Wichita State; Marquette; Xavier; Virginia Tech; Notre Dame	W 94–70; W 83–70; W 63–62; W 78–75; W 83–63
1991	First Round	Colorado	L 64–71
1997	First Round; Second Round; Quarterfinals; Semifinals; Final	Miami FL; Oklahoma State; Notre Dame; Arkansas; Florida State	W 76–63; W 75–65; W 67–66; W 77–62; W 82–73
2000	First Round	Notre Dame	L 65–75
2004	First Round; Second Round; Quarterfinals; Semifinals; Final	Missouri; Oklahoma; Hawaii; Oregon; Rutgers	W 65–64; W 63–52; W 88–73; W 78–53; W 62–55
2006	First Round; Second Round; Quarterfinals; Semifinals; Final	UTEP; Notre Dame; Miami FL; Old Dominion; South Carolina	W 82–67; W 87–84; W 71–65; W 66–43; L 64–76
2007	First Round; Second Round	Utah State; Florida State	W 68–58; L 66–87
2023	First Round; Second Round	Toledo; Vanderbilt	W 90–80; L 65–66

== Statistics ==
National records

- Most different players to make a Three-point field goal in game: 9 vs. Eastern Michigan, December 13, 2008 (tied Dartmouth, 1993)
- Combined team rebounds: 152, Michigan (57) vs. Indiana (95) March 11, 1961

NCAA Division I Men's Basketball Championship Tournament records

- Single-game rebounds (Since 1973): 26—Phil Hubbard, Michigan vs. Detroit, RSF, Mar 17, 1977
- Single-year points 184—Glen Rice, Michigan, 1989 (6 games)
- Single-year field goals made 75—Glen Rice, Michigan, 1989 (6 games)
- Single-year three-point field goals made 27—Glen Rice, Michigan, 1989 (6 games)
- Career three-point field goals percentage (Minimum 30 made) 56.5% (35–62)—Glen Rice, Michigan, 1986–89 (13 games)
- Single-game points, Both Teams 264—Loyola Marymount (149) vs. Michigan (115), 2nd R, Mar 18, 1990
- Fewest single-game three-point field goals made, team (final four): 0, *Michigan vs. Kentucky, NSF, March 4, 1993 (ot)
- Fewest single-game three-point field goals attempted, team (final four): 4, *Michigan vs. Kentucky, NSF, March 4, 1993 (ot)
- Single-game assists (in a championship game): 11, Rumeal Robinson, Michigan vs. Seton Hall, March 4, 1989 (ot)
- Fewest single-game three-point field goals made, team (championship game): 1, *Michigan vs. Duke, CH, June 4, 1992
- Fewest single-game free throws made (in a win), team: 0, Michigan vs. Tennessee, Mar 18, 2011
- Lowest single-game three-point field goal percentage, team (championship game): 9.1% (1–11), *Michigan vs. Duke, CH, June 4, 1992
- Biggest margin of victory in 8 vs. 9 match-up: 30, Michigan vs. Tennessee, Mar 18, 2011
- Single-year two-game assists (final four): 23, Rumeal Robinson, Michigan, 1989

Selected former NCAA Division I Men's Basketball Championship Tournament records

- Single-game free throws made (final four): 15, Bill Buntin, Michigan vs. Kansas State, N3d, Mar 21, 1964 (broken Mar 20, 1965)
- Fewest single-game three-point field goals made, team (final four): 1, *Michigan vs. Duke, CH, June 4, 1992 (broken March 4, 1993)
- Lowest single-game three-point field goal percentage, team (final four): 9.1% (1–11), *Michigan vs. Duke, CH, June 4, 1992 (broken January 4, 2006)
- Most single-game players disqualified, team (championship game): 3, Michigan vs. UCLA, Mar 20, 1965 (broken Mar 31, 1997)
- Single-year two-game assists, team (final four): 42, Michigan, 1989 (broken 1990)

National statistical champions

- Team field goal percentage: 54.6% (1198 of 2196), 1988; 56.6% (1325 of 2341), 1989

Selected notable statistics

- 30-win seasons: 2019 (30), 2018 (33), 2013 (31), 1993* (31), 1989 (30)
- 1989 team continues to rank second in single-season team field goal percentage: 56.6% (1325 of 2341).

Current Big Ten records

- Career field goals attempted: Mike McGee (2077, 1978–81)
- Career three-point field goals made: Louis Bullock (339*, 1996–99)
- Single-game three-point field goals percentage (100% most made): Glen Rice (7 of 7, vs. Wisconsin February 25, 1989)
- Single-season points, team: (3393, 1988–89)
- Single-game field goals made, team: (55, vs. Iowa October 3, 1990)
- Single-season field goals made, team: (1325, 1988–89)
- Single-season field goals attempted, team: (2341, 1988–89)
- Single-season field goal percentage, team: (.566, 1,325 of 2,341, 1988–89)
- Single-season field goal percentage, team (conference games only): (.561, 606 of 1,080, 1988–89)
- Single-game three-point field goals attempted, team: (42, vs. Florida Gulf Coast December 22, 2008)
- Single-game three-point field goals attempted, team (conference games only): (40, at Indiana 1/7/09)
- Single-season three-point field goals attempted, team: (912, 2008–09)
- Single-season three-point field goals attempted, team (conference games only): (471, 2008–09)
- Single-season rebounds, team: (1521, 1964–65)
- Single-game assists, team: (37, vs. Western Michigan July 12, 1987 and vs. Eastern Michigan December 12, 1987)
- Single-game assists, team (conference games only): (36, vs. Iowa March 2, 1988)
- Single-season assists, team: (745, 1988–89)
- Single-game blocked shots, team: (18, vs. Florida Southern July 12, 1985)
- Single-season free throw percentage (conference games only): Daniel Horton (.978 (89 of 91), 2006)
- Single-season personal fouls, team: (456, 1953)
- Single-season overtime games: (6, 1981)

Selected former Big Ten records

- Career points: Mike McGee (2439, 1977–81, broken in 1989), Glen Rice (2442, 1985–89, broken in 1993)
- Career points (conference games only): McGee (1503, 1977–81, broken in 1995)
- Single-game field goals made: John Tidwell (20, vs. Minnesota April 3, 1961, broken February 16, 1963)
- Single-season field goals made: Cazzie Russell (308, 1965–66, broken 1981), McGee (309, 1980–81, broken in 1986)
- Career field goals made: Russell (839, 1964–66, broken 1970), McGee (1010, 1978–81, broken in 1993)
- Single-game three-point field goals made: Garde Thompson (9, vs. Navy December 3, 1987, broken February 23, 2003)
- Single-game points, team: 128 (vs. Purdue February 19, 1966, broken December 30, 2006)
- Single-game field goals made, team: (52, vs. Purdue February 19, 1966, broken December 19, 1972)
- Single-season field goals made, team: (1198, 1987–88, broken 1989)
- Single-season assists, team: (694, 1987–88, broken 1989)
- Single-season blocked shots, team: (193, 1992–93*, surpassed 2000)
- Single-season field goals made per game (conference games only): Russell (13.0 (182 in 14), 1966, broken 1969)
- Single-season rebounds (total and per game) (conference games only): M. C. Burton (249 in 14 games, 1959, broken 1960)
- Single-season points per game, team (conference games only): 92.9 (1965 (1,300 in 14), broken 1966)
- Single-season points per game, team (conference games only): 95.4 (1966 (1,336 in 14), broken 1969)
- Single-season three-point field goals attempted, team (conference games only): (434, 2007–08)
- Single-game three-point field goal percentage, team (conference games only): .875 (7 of 8, vs. Iowa March 2, 1988, broken April 2, 1988)

Big Ten statistical champions (individual)

- Scoring (Conference games only until 1990): 1928 Bennie Oosterbaan 129; 1959 M.C. Burton 22.6; 1966 Cazzie Russell 33.2; 1974 Campy Russell 24.0; 1988 Glen Rice 22.9; 1989 Rice 24.8
- Field goal Percentage (Conference games only until 1990): 1966 Cazzie Russell .542; 1967 Dave McClellan .588; 1971 Ken Brady .617; 1975 John Robinson .603; 1979 Marty Bodnar .603; 1989 Loy Vaught .677; 2001 Chris Young .640 (all games); 2006 Courtney Sims .633 (all games)
- Three-point field goals: 1989 Glen Rice 55 (conference games); 1991 Demetrius Calip 48 (conference games); 1998 Louis Bullock 51* (conference games); 1999 Robbie Reid 49 (conference games); 1997 Louis Bullock 101* (all games); 1998 Louis Bullock 93* (all games)
- Three-point field goal percentage: 1998 Louis Bullock .481* (conference games); 1999 Robbie Reid .458 (conference games); 2003 LaVell Blanchard .433 (conference games)
- Free throw percentage: 1975 C.J. Kupec .880 (conference games); 1997 Louis Bullock .893* (conference games); 2006 Daniel Horton .978 (conference games); 2007 Dion Harris .873 (conference games); 1998 Louis Bullock .911* (all games); 1999 Louis Bullock .864* (all games); 2006 Daniel Horton .901 (all games)
- Rebounds: 1959 M.C. Burton 17.8 (conference games); 1963 Bill Buntin 15.4 (conference games); 1969 Rudy Tomjanovich 12.8 (conference games); 1970 Rudy Tomjanovich 16.2 (conference games); 1985 Roy Tarpley 9.9 (conference games); 1990 Loy Vaught 10.7 (conference games); 1992 Chris Webber-FR 9.8* (conference games); 1993 Chris Webber 9.7* (conference games); 1990 Loy Vaught 11.2; 1992 Chris Webber-FR 10.0*; 1993 Chris Webber 10.1*
- Assists: 1988 Gary Grant 6.5 (conference games); 1990 Rumeal Robinson 6.1 (all games); 2013 Trey Burke 6.7 (all games)
- Steals: 1987 Gary Grant 2.67 (conference games); 1988 Gary Grant 2.72 (conference games)
- Blocked shots: 1986 Roy Tarpley 2.50 (conference games); 1989 Terry Mills 1.22 (conference games); 2008 Ekpe Udoh 2.67 (conference games); 2004 Courtney Sims 2.00 (all games); 2008 Ekpe Udoh 2.88 (all games)

Big Ten statistical champions (team, conference games only)

- Scoring offense: 1946 55.1, 1965 92.9, 1966 95.4, 1971 88.4, 1972 81.8, 1976 85.8, 1977 83.2, 1987 86.7, 1989 87.8, 1997* 73.3,
- Scoring defense: 1948 46.3, 1952 56.2, 1964 75.5
- Scoring margin: 1948 7.6, 1964 10.3, 1965 12.2, 1966 9.9, 1977 9.4, 1985 8.8, 1986 10.6, 1989 10.3
- Field goal percentage offense: 1966 48.9, 1972 45.3, 1976 52.1, 1989 56.1, 2013 46.9, 2017 48.3
- Field goal percentage defense: 1995 39.4
- Three-point field goals: 1987 89, 1989 103, 1991 118, 1998* 121, 2009 151
- Three-point field goal percentage: 1998 40.1, 2003 37.5
- Free throw percentage: 1958 73.4, 1975 75.8, 2017 77.9
- Rebounds: 1963 49.0, 1965 49.5, 1972 51.6, 1983 34.4, 1986 35.1, 1992 38.2, 1993* 40.9
- Rebounding margin: 1986 5.8, 1992 5.8, 1993* 7.6, 2004 3.4
- Steals: 1986 8.61
- Blocked shots: 1986 3.94, 1993* 5.0, 2004 4.31, 2008 4.28
- Turnover margin: 2017 3.4

== Rankings ==
Michigan teams have spent a total of 24 weeks ranked No. 1, with the last occurrence in 2026. Two Michigan teams have defeated the No. 1 ranked team: against Wichita State on December 14, 1964 and Duke on December 13, 1997.

The following table summarizes Michigan's history in the AP poll:

	Preseason	Peak	Final	Weeks ranked	Weeks @ #1
Top 10 Poll
1963–64	8	2	2	15/15	0
1964–65	1	1	1	15/15	10
1965–66	2	2	9	10/15	0
1966–67	NR	5	NR	3/15	0
Top 20 Poll
1970–71	NR	12	NR	4/16	0
1971–72	13	9	NR	4/16	0
1972–73	19	18	NR	3/16	0
1973–74	NR	6	6	12/18	0
1974–75	17	11	19	8/19	0
1975–76	16	9	9	16/17	0
1976–77	1	1	1	17/17	8
1977–78	13	9	NR	4/17	0
1978–79	8	6	NR	8/17	0
1980–81	NR	9	NR	11/16	0
1983–84	NR	15	NR	2/17	0
1984–85	NR	2	2	12/17	0
1985–86	3	2	5	17/17	0
1987–88	9	7	10	17/17	0
1988–89	3	2	10	18/18	0
Top 25 Poll
1989–90	4	3	13	17/17	0
1991–92	20	11	15	18/18	0
1992–93	1	1	3	18/18	3
1993–94	5	3	11	18/18	0
1994–95	16	13	NR	5/18	0
1995–96	17	16	NR	13/18	0
1996–97	9	4	NR	16/18	0
1997–98	NR	12	12	12/18	0
2005–06	NR	21	NR	2/19	0
2008–09	NR	23	NR	3/19	0
2009–10	15	15	NR	3/20	0
2011–12	18	10	13	19/19	0
2012–13	5	1	T–10	19/19	1
2013–14	7	7	7	13/19	0
2014–15	24	17	NR	4/19	0
2015–16	25	24	NR	2/19	0
2016–17	NR	23	23	2/19	0
2017–18	NR	7	7	9/19	0
2018–19	19	2	8	19/19	0
2019–20	NR	4	NR	8/19	0
2020–21	25	2	4	15/17	0
2021–22	6	4	NR	3/19	0
2022–23	22	20	NR	2/19	0
2024–25	NR	10	10	13/19	0
2025–26	7	1	1	19/19	2
2026–27	16	16	—	3/19	0

== Notes ==
a: * designates records and awards forfeited due to the University of Michigan basketball scandal.

== See also ==
- List of NCAA Division I Men's Final Four appearances by coach
- NCAA Division I Men's Final Four appearances by school
- NCAA Division I men's basketball tournament bids by school
- NCAA Division I men's basketball tournament bids by school and conference
- NCAA Division I men's basketball tournament all-time team records
