= List of most watched United States television broadcasts of 1992 =

The following is a list of most watched United States television broadcasts of 1992.

== Most watched by week ==
Broadcast (primetime only)
Week of	Title	Network	Viewers (in millions)	Ref.
January 6	NFC Championship post-game show	CBS	37.8	
January 13	60 Minutes	CBS	33.8	
January 20	Super Bowl XXVI	CBS	79.6	
January 27	60 Minutes	CBS	31.1	
February 3	NBC Sunday Night Movie	NBC	38.5	
February 10	60 Minutes	CBS	36.4	
February 17	1992 Winter Olympics (Fri)	CBS	39.7	
February 24	60 Minutes	CBS	31.0	
March 2	Roseanne	ABC	34.6	
March 9	60 Minutes	CBS	32.3	
March 16	Roseanne	ABC	33.8	
March 23	Roseanne	ABC	37.6	
March 30	64th Academy Awards	ABC	44.4	
April 6	NCAA Championship	CBS	34.4	
April 13	Roseanne	ABC	30.4	
April 20	Roseanne	ABC	31.5	
April 27	The Cosby Show	NBC	44.4	
May 4	Roseanne	ABC	31.9	
May 11	Cheers	NBC	32.9	
May 18	Murphy Brown	CBS	33.7	
May 25	Roseanne	ABC	29.8	
June 1	Roseanne	ABC	24.8	
June 8	NBA Finals (Game 6) post-game show	NBC	26.5	
June 15	Roseanne	ABC	25.1	
June 22	Home Improvement	ABC	22.6	
June 29	Roseanne	ABC	24.0	
July 6	Roseanne	ABC	24.9	
July 13	Home Improvement	ABC	23.3	
July 20	1992 Summer Olympics (Sun)	NBC	28.7	
July 27	1992 Summer Olympics (Thurs)	NBC	34.0	
August 3	1992 Summer Olympics (Mon)	NBC	24.7	
August 10	Roseanne	ABC	23.6	
August 17	Roseanne	ABC	23.5	
August 24	Roseanne	ABC	23.7	
August 31	Roseanne	ABC	24.6	
September 7	Monday Night Football	ABC	28.6	
September 15	Roseanne	ABC	36.7	
1992–93 television season begins
September 21	Murphy Brown	CBS	44.0	
September 28	Roseanne	ABC	35.9	
October 5	Roseanne	ABC	33.7	
October 12	Roseanne	ABC	31.5	
October 19	60 Minutes	CBS	35.6	
October 26	Roseanne	ABC	37.0	
November 2	60 Minutes	CBS	31.6	
November 9	The Jacksons: An American Dream	ABC	35.3	
November 16	The Jacksons: An American Dream	ABC	38.3	
November 23	60 Minutes	CBS	35.5	
November 30	Roseanne	ABC	35.2	
December 7	60 Minutes	CBS	35.3	
December 14	Roseanne	ABC	34.4	
December 21	60 Minutes	CBS	31.3	
December 28	60 Minutes	CBS	39.0	
