= 1992 NCAA Division I men's basketball championship game =

American college basketball final

1992 NCAA Tournament Championship Game
National championship game
| Michigan Wolverines | Duke Blue Devils |
| Big Ten | ACC |
| (25–8) | (33–2) |
|---|---|
| 51 | 71 |
| Head coach: Steve Fisher | Head coach: Mike Krzyzewski |
- AP: 15
- Coaches: 16
- AP: 1
- Coaches: 1
| | 1st half | 2nd half | Total |
|---|---|---|---|
| Michigan Wolverines | 31 | 20 | 51 |
| Duke Blue Devils | 30 | 41 | 71 |
- Date: April 6, 1992
- Venue: Hubert H. Humphrey Metrodome, Minneapolis, Minnesota
- MVP: Bobby Hurley, Duke
- Favorite: Duke by 5.5
- Attendance: 50,379

United States TV coverage
- Network: CBS
- Announcers: Jim Nantz (play-by-play); Billy Packer (color)

The 1992 NCAA Men's Division I Basketball Championship Game was the finals of the 1992 NCAA Men's Division I Basketball Tournament and it determined the national champion for the 1991-92 NCAA Division I men's basketball season The game was played on April 6, 1992, at the Hubert H. Humphrey Metrodome in Minneapolis, Minnesota. It featured the East Regional Champion and defending national champion, overall #1 seed Duke versus the Southeast Regional Champion, #6-seeded Michigan.

Duke defeated Fab Five-led Michigan 71–51 to become the sixth school to repeat as national champions and were the last to repeat until the Florida Gators in 2006 and 2007.

This was the first of four consecutive losses in the national championship game for the Wolverines, as Michigan would lose in the championship game again in 1993, as well as in 2013 and 2018. Though this game and the 1993 title game would later be vacated by Michigan due to sanctions involving the eligibility of Chris Webber in the University of Michigan basketball scandal.

== Participating teams ==
=== Michigan Wolverines ===
- Southeast
  - (6) Michigan 73, (11) Temple 66
  - (6) Michigan 102, (14) East Tennessee State 90
  - (6) Michigan 75, (2) Oklahoma State 72
  - (6) Michigan 75, (1) Ohio State 71 (OT)
- Final Four
  - (SE6) Michigan 76, (MW4) Cincinnati 72

=== Duke Blue Devils ===
- East
  - (1) Duke 82, (16) Campbell 56
  - (1) Duke 75, (9) Iowa 62
  - (1) Duke 81, (4) Seton Hall 69
  - (1) Duke 104, (2) Kentucky 103 (OT)
- Final Four
  - (E1) Duke 81, (W2) Indiana 78

== Game summary ==
April 6, 1992

#SE6 ~~Michigan Wolverines~~ 51, #E1 Duke Blue Devils 71
Scoring by half: 31-30, 20-41
| Pts: Chris Webber 14; Rebs: Chris Webber 11; Asts: Jalen Rose 4 | Pts: Christian Laettner 19; Rebs: Grant Hill 10; Asts: Bobby Hurley 7 |

Hubert H. Humphrey Metrodome, Minneapolis, Minnesota

| Starters: | | | Pts | Reb | Ast |
|---|---|---|---|---|---|
| G | 5 | Jalen Rose | 11 | 5 | 4 |
| G | 24 | Jimmy King | 7 | 2 | 1 |
| F | 21 | Ray Jackson | 4 | 3 | 2 |
| F | 4 | Chris Webber | 14 | 11 | 1 |
| C | 25 | Juwan Howard | 9 | 3 | 0 |
| Reserves: | | | | | |
| F/C | 43 | Eric Riley | 4 | 4 | 1 |
| F | 32 | James Voskuil | 4 | 3 | 3 |
| G | 3 | Rob Pelinka | 2 | 2 | 1 |
| G/F | 31 | Freddie Hunter | 0 | 0 | 0 |
| G | 22 | Jason Bossard | 0 | 0 | 0 |
| G | 14 | Michael Talley | 0 | 1 | 0 |
| F | 43 | Chip Armer | 0 | 0 | 0 |
| F | 34 | Chris Seter | 0 | 1 | 0 |
Head coach:
Steve Fisher

| Michigan | Duke |

| Michigan | Statistics | Duke |
|---|---|---|
| 22/58 (38%) | Field goals | 25/57 (44%) |
| 1/11 (9%) | 3-pt. field goals | 4/9 (44%) |
| 6/12 (50%) | Free throws | 17/22 (77%) |
| 14 | Offensive rebounds | 13 |
| 19 | Defensive rebounds | 22 |
| 33 | Total rebounds | 35 |
| 13 | Assists | 12 |
| 20 | Turnovers | 14 |
| 8 | Steals | 9 |
| 3 | Blocks | 4 |
| 17 | Fouls | 13 |

| Starters: | | | Pts | Reb | Ast |
|---|---|---|---|---|---|
| G | 11 | Bobby Hurley | 9 | 3 | 7 |
| G | 12 | Thomas Hill | 16 | 7 | 0 |
| F | 33 | Grant Hill | 18 | 10 | 5 |
| F | 32 | Christian Laettner | 19 | 7 | 0 |
| C | 21 | Antonio Lang | 5 | 4 | 0 |
| Reserves: | | | | | |
| F | 44 | Cherokee Parks | 4 | 3 | 0 |
| G/F | 23 | Brian Davis | 0 | 0 | 0 |
| F | 54 | Christian Ast | 0 | 1 | 0 |
| G | 4 | Kenneth Blakeney | 0 | 0 | 0 |
| G | 5 | Ron Burt | 0 | 0 | 0 |
| G | 3 | Marty Clark | 0 | 0 | 0 |
Head coach:
Mike Krzyzewski

== Media coverage ==
The championship game was televised in the United States by CBS. Jim Nantz provided play-by-play, while Billy Packer provided color commentary.

== Aftermath ==
Michigan would later vacate its appearance in both the 1992 and 1993 Final Four and their subsequent title games due to sanctions involving the eligibility of Chris Webber in the Ed Martin scandal. While the other members of the Fab Five were cleared of any wrongdoing, the group's reputation was nonetheless tarnished by the scandal. The Fab Five insulted Bobby Hurley after the game, with Jimmy King telling Sports Illustrated that Chris Webber should have been the Final 4 MVP instead of the Duke point guard, but several of the core group later admitted that they were beaten by a superior Duke team (in the context of stating that the 1993 UNC Tar Heels team that defeated Michigan for the title was NOT the better team in that lost contest).

1992 marked the start of a losing streak in the national championship game for the Wolverines. Michigan would lose in the championship game again in 1993, as well as in 2013 and 2018, which brought their record in the title game to 1–6, the worst record among teams that have previously won a championship. The losing streak would eventually come to an end in 2026, as Michigan defeated UConn to win their second championship.

Duke would return to the national championship game in 1994 and 1999, but they would fall to Arkansas and UConn respectively. The Blue Devils would win their next championship in 2001 against Arizona.
