= Fab Five (University of Michigan) =

Men's basketball team of the University of Michigan

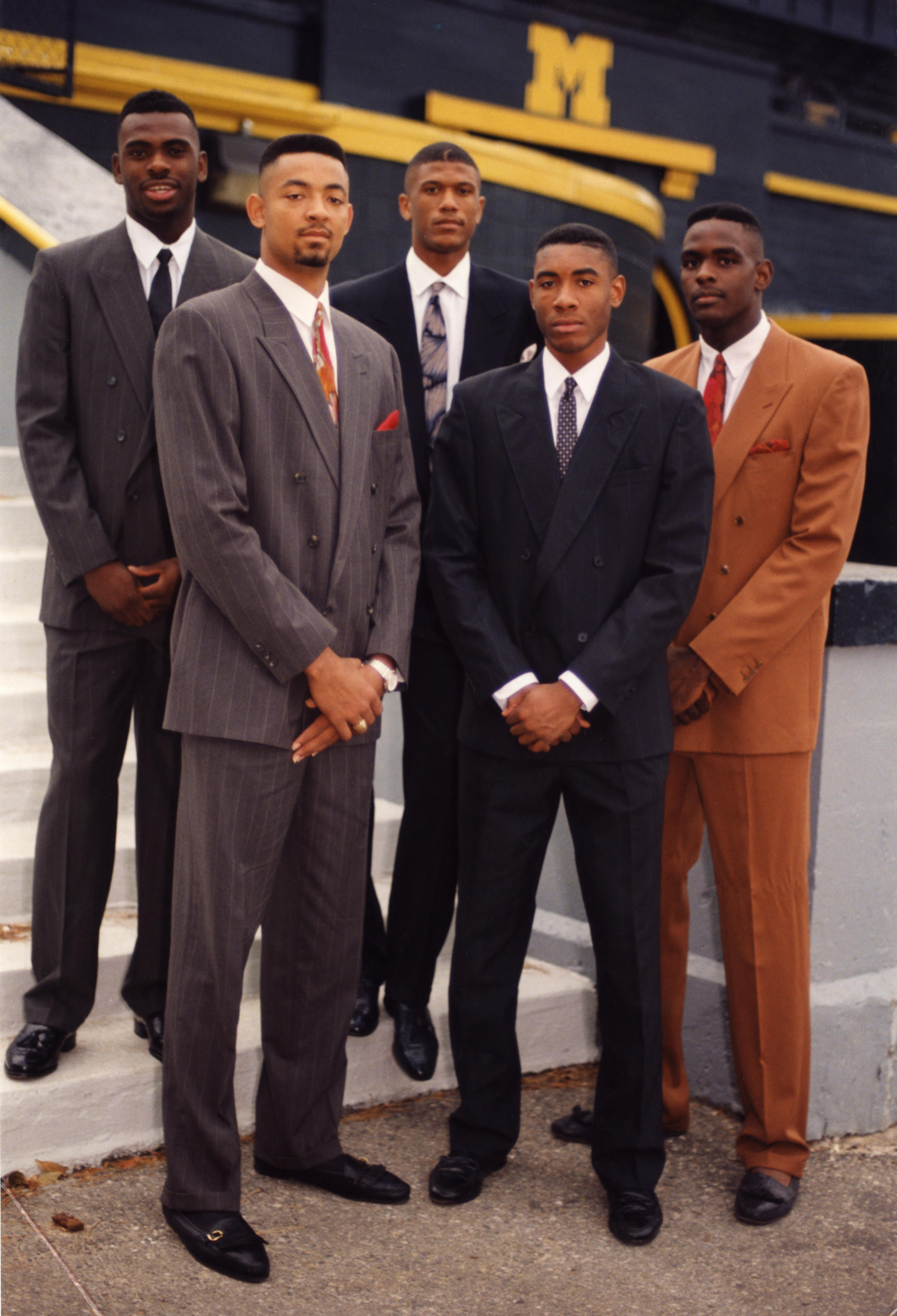
The Fab Five photographed by the University of Michigan athletic department in 1992. From left to right: Ray Jackson, Juwan Howard, Jalen Rose, Jimmy King and Chris Webber.

The Fab Five was the 1991 University of Michigan men's basketball team recruiting class that many consider one of the greatest recruiting classes of all time. The class consisted of Detroit natives Chris Webber (#4) and Jalen Rose (#5), Chicago native Juwan Howard (#25), and two recruits from Texas: Plano's Jimmy King (#24) and Austin's Ray Jackson (#21). The Fab Five were the first team in NCAA history to compete in the championship game with all-freshman starters. Ultimately, Michigan forfeited the 112 games and its 1992 season for four players accepting over $616,000 from a Michigan booster.

Their trend-setting but controversial antics on the court garnered much media attention. They are the subjects of The Fab Five, the highest-rated ESPN Films documentary ever produced, one of the featured teams in two of the highest-rated NCAA Men's Basketball Championship games ever played in terms of households (although not viewers), and a marketing juggernaut whose merchandise sales dwarfed even those of the national champion 1988–89 Michigan Wolverines men's basketball team.

Four of the five participated in the 1991 McDonald's All-American Game. Four McDonald's All-Americans in a single recruiting class stood as an unbroken record until the 2013 McDonald's All-American Boys Game included six members of the entering class for the 2013–14 Kentucky Wildcats team. Four of the five members went on to play in the NBA.

== History ==
At first, only three of the freshmen started for the 1991–92 Michigan men's basketball team. They all played when the season opened on December 2, 1991, against the University of Detroit, but did not all play at the same time until December 7, against Eastern Michigan, and did not start regularly until February 9, 1992. In that first game starting together, the five freshmen scored all the team's points against Notre Dame. They started as a unit in all but one of the season's remaining games. They reached the 1992 and 1993 NCAA Men's Division I Basketball Championship games as both freshmen and sophomores. But most of their wins and both of their Final Four appearances were vacated because Webber accepted financial aids from Ed Martin that compromised his amateur status.

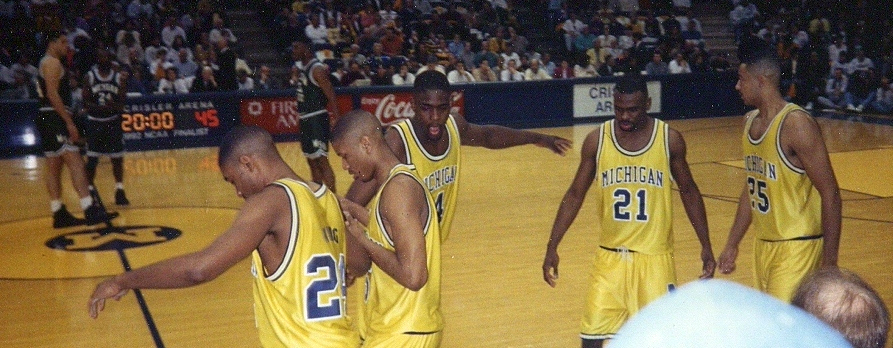
The Fab Five during their sophomore year at Crisler Arena, March 1993. From left to right, Jimmy King, Jalen Rose, Chris Webber, Ray Jackson, Juwan Howard.

As students, they wore black athletic shoes, black athletic socks, and baggy basketball shorts. This look was seen as an affront to conventional college basketball attire at that time but quickly became a national trend, with many players (younger ones in particular) ditching the shorter shorts and white socks that were then the standard to emulate Michigan's stars.

Originally, the players rebelled against the moniker and attempted to give themselves the nickname "Five Times" (written "5X's").

In the elite eight round of the 1992 NCAA Men's Division I Basketball Tournament, Michigan had a rematch against a Jimmy Jackson-led Ohio State Buckeyes team that had beaten them twice during the regular season by double digits. Michigan won the rematch as the Fab Five scored all but two Wolverines points. Despite their talent, they never won a Big Ten Regular Season Championship or NCAA Championship. They reached the NCAA championship game as freshmen in 1992 and again as sophomores in 1993. They lost to Duke 71–51 in the 1992 title game and 77–71 to North Carolina in 1993, a game remembered mostly for Webber's costly "timeout", which resulted in a technical foul as Michigan had no timeouts remaining. Many criticized the five after the Duke loss in particular for mocking and insulting Duke guard Bobby Hurley's appearance and playing style, which followed the Fab Five's earlier hatred of Duke superstar Christian Laettner (in the ESPN movie about them, Rose noted that he had thought Laettner was overrated but realized when the two teams faced off in the 1991–92 regular season that Laettner was a great player).

Webber earned second-team All-Big Ten Conference recognition in 1992 and first-team recognition in 1993. Howard received honorable mention in 1992, second-team selection in 1993 and first-team selection in 1994. Rose was a third-team selection in 1993 and first-team selection in 1994. King was an honorable mention selection in 1993 and 1994 and a third-team selection in 1995. Jackson was an honorable mention selection in 1994 and second-team selection in 1995.

The Fab Five was estranged for many years because of Webber's association with a Michigan booster. The scandal resulted in the program having to forfeit victories from Webber's two seasons and the Final Four banners being removed. The NCAA also banned Webber from associating with the program for 10 years.

Four of the five members went on to play in the NBA. Only Jackson did not. King played two seasons. Howard was a one-time NBA All-Star and won two NBA championship rings with the Miami Heat. Rose grew as a player between 1999 and 2003, leading the Indiana Pacers in scoring the year they reached the NBA Finals, 2000. Webber was an NBA All-Star and the leading scorer on the Sacramento Kings team that reached the Western Conference Finals, in 2002. As a member of the Miami Heat, Howard became the first and only member of the Fab Five to win an NBA championship, in 2012. Though he was old by NBA standards at that point and played limited minutes, his leadership and high basketball IQ were huge assets for both the 2012 Heat and the 2013 team that repeated as champions; Howard's time in Miami led to his becoming an assistant coach of the team after he retired from playing, and that in turn led to his being hired to coach his alma mater, where he remained until 2024.

All five members were featured commentators on an alternate TV broadcast of the Wolverines' 2026 Final Four matchup against the Arizona Wildcats on April 4, 2026.

== Members ==
=== Chris Webber ===
After graduating from Detroit Country Day School, where he led his team to three MHSAA basketball titles and won state and national high school Gatorade Player of the Year awards and McDonald's All-American Game MVP, Webber attended the University of Michigan for two years. Chris Webber had drawn attention from colleges all around the country because of his dunks in 7th grade AAU basketball.

On April 5, 1993, at Michigan's second consecutive NCAA Men's Division I Basketball Championship game, Webber infamously called a time-out with 11 seconds left in the game when his team, down 73–71, did not have any remaining, which resulted in a technical foul that effectively clinched the game for North Carolina. That season, Webber was a first team All-American selection and a finalist for the John R. Wooden Award and Naismith College Player of the Year. These awards and honors have been vacated due to University of Michigan and NCAA sanctions related to the University of Michigan basketball scandal.

Webber was the first of the Fab Five to leave school, doing so after his sophomore year. He was drafted #1 overall by the Orlando Magic in the 1993 NBA draft, but was traded on draft night to the Golden State Warriors for Penny Hardaway. He played with five teams over his fifteen-year career and had his #4 retired by the Sacramento Kings, with whom he spent a majority of those years. He became an analyst for the NBA on TNT. Webber holds NBA career averages of 20.7 points per game, 9.8 rebounds per game, 4.2 assists per game, and 1.4 blocks per game. He was selected to the NBA All-Star game five times during his fifteen-year NBA career. On May 16, 2021, it was announced that Webber would be a part of the 2021 Basketball Hall of Fame Class.

=== Jalen Rose ===
The son of former NBA player Jimmy Walker, Jalen Rose was a star at Southwestern High School in Detroit; he can be seen at a high school All-American camp in the documentary film Hoop Dreams. Rose attended the University of Michigan, where the Wolverines reached two NCAA Finals games in 1992 and 1993, finishing as national runners-up both times. Rose was a part of Wolverines coach Steve Fisher's 1991 recruiting class. He led the Fab Five in scoring during his freshman year, averaging 17.6 points per game, and set the school freshman scoring record with 597 total points. Aside from being the most outspoken of the Fab Five, Rose also was their point guard and leader. During his career he scored over 1700 points, and had 400 rebounds, 400 assists, and 100 steals. Of the players called before the grand jury (Robert Traylor, Webber, Rose, Maurice Taylor, and Louis Bullock), he was the only one not listed as having received large amounts of money. When questioned by the grand jury, Rose admitted to receiving money from Martin, but that it was small gifts of a few hundred dollars a time in spending money, amounting to only $2,000-$3,000 in total over two years.

Rose left Michigan after his junior year, and was picked by the Denver Nuggets in the 1994 NBA draft. He played most of his NBA career with the Indiana Pacers and was a key member of the teams that went to three consecutive Eastern Conference Finals in the late 1990s and the 2000 NBA Finals Pacer team. He finished his career in 2007 with the Phoenix Suns. Rose then became an NBA analyst with ABC & ESPN from 2007 to 2023.

=== Juwan Howard ===
Howard had a successful career at Chicago Vocational Career Academy, and can be seen playing in the high school basketball documentary Hoop Dreams. He left Michigan after his junior year, and was drafted fifth overall in the 1994 NBA draft by the Washington Bullets for whom he played until 2001. Although the Fab Five final four appearances were later vacated, he was not among the players called before the grand jury (as were Robert Traylor, Chris Webber, Jalen Rose, Maurice Taylor, and Louis Bullock).

Howard was the only member of the Fab Five still playing in the NBA through the 2011–12 season; he played for eight teams in 16 seasons. He was a member of the Portland Trail Blazers in 2009–10, and was a member of the Miami Heat for the 2010–11 and 2011–12 seasons. He played for the Heat in the 2011 NBA Finals against the Dallas Mavericks which the Heat lost, and he saw limited action during the Heat's successful postseason run following the 2011–12 season. Howard has played for eight different NBA franchises including the Washington Wizards, Dallas Mavericks, Denver Nuggets, Orlando Magic, Houston Rockets, Charlotte Bobcats, Portland Trail Blazers, and Miami Heat. He holds NBA career averages of 13.8 points per game, 6.3 rebounds per game, and 2.3 assists per game.

On June 21, 2012, Howard won the NBA championship with the Miami Heat, becoming the only member of the Fab Five to win a championship.

Howard was signed by the Miami Heat once again during the 2013 season to a 10-day contract, on March 2, and then re-signed to a second 10-day contract on March 12. The Miami Heat announced on March 22 that they signed Howard for the remainder of the season. Per club policy, terms of the deal were not disclosed. Howard was an assistant coach with the Miami Heat from 2014 to 2019. Howard won his second NBA Championship, repeating against the San Antonio Spurs, winning in the American Airlines Arena closing out a Game 7.

On May 22, 2019, Howard was announced as the head coach for the University of Michigan. He replaced John Beilein, who accepted the head coaching position for the Cleveland Cavaliers. He remained with the team until his eventual firing at the conclusion of a losing 2023–24 season.

=== Jimmy King ===
King was a starter for teams that reached the tournament four times. Before this, he was a high school All-American basketball player at Plano East Senior High School in Plano, a city north of Dallas. Although the Fab Five final four appearances are forfeited, he was not among the players called before the grand jury. King and Ray Jackson were the only two members of the Fab Five that did not leave school early for the draft, staying with Michigan for their entire four years of eligibility.

King was selected in the second round (35th overall) in the 1995 NBA draft by the Toronto Raptors. He played in a total of 64 games in 2 seasons with the Raptors and Denver Nuggets, and made one start for the Raptors in 1996. King played for the Quad City Thunder (a CBA team) for most of his career. King retired with a career average of 4.5 points after the 1996–97 season.

In a phone interview on The Jim Rome Show on November 30, 2006, King stated he was currently working as a financial advisor for Merrill Lynch on Wall Street. During the 2008–09 Michigan Wolverines season, King served as a radio color commentator.

=== Ray Jackson ===
Although the Fab Five Final Four appearances have been vacated, Ray Jackson was not among the players called before the grand jury (Robert Traylor, Webber, Rose, Maurice Taylor, and Louis Bullock) in the University of Michigan basketball scandal and was not found to have received large amounts of money.

Perhaps the least known of the Fab Five, Jackson was not drafted into nor did he play in the NBA. He was cut in preseason by the New York Knicks before the 1995–96 season and cut by the Detroit Pistons before the 1996–97 season. He was drafted into the Continental Basketball Association (CBA) by the Grand Rapids Hoops as 35th pick overall in the 3rd round in 1995.

While with the Hoops, he received the 1995–96 CBA Rookie of the Year Award.

In a February 10, 2007, article on Yahoo! Sports, Jackson says that: "It took me a long time to get over the fact that I was the only one that didn't make it to the NBA from the Fab Five, but I'm over it because I'm back home and I'm happy with what I'm doing with my life."

Jackson now lives in Austin, Texas, where he runs a moving company and Rise Up Inc., a not-for-profit organization that assists children socially, educationally, and on the basketball court.

== Stats ==
=== Season stats ===
1991–92 season
Season	Name	GP	GS	Min	MPG	FG	FGA	FG%	3FG	3FGA	3FG%	FT	FTA	FT%	OR	DR	RB	RPG	Ast	APG	PF	DQ	TO	Stl	Blk	Pts	PPG
1991–92	Jalen Rose	34	33	1132	33.3	206	424	0.486	36	111	0.324	149	197	0.756	52	94	146	4.3	135	4	75	0	114	38	8	597	17.6
1991–92	Chris Webber	34	34	1090	32.1	229	412	0.556	14	54	0.259	56	113	0.496	128	212	340	10	76	2.2	99	5	95	54	84	528	15.5
1991–92	Juwan Howard	34	31	956	28.1	150	333	0.45	0	2	0.000	77	112	0.688	66	146	212	6.2	62	1.8	107	3	99	14	21	377	11.1
1991–92	Jimmy King	34	21	955	28.1	128	258	0.496	28	60	0.467	53	72	0.736	33	79	112	3.3	78	2.3	53	0	72	28	9	337	9.9
1991–92	Ray Jackson	34	15	592	17.4	66	121	0.545	2	10	0.2	21	46	0.457	47	56	103	3	58	1.7	79	3	52	24	11	155	4.6

1992–93 season
Season	Name	GP	GS	Min	MPG	FG	FGA	FG%	3FG	3FGA	3FG%	FT	FTA	FT%	OR	DR	RB	RPG	Ast	APG	PF	DQ	TO	Stl	Blk	Pts	PPG
1992–93	Chris Webber	36	36	1138	31.6	281	454	0.619	27	80	0.338	101	183	0.552	155	207	362	10.1	90	2.5	102	4	105	49	90	690	19.2
1992–93	Jalen Rose	36	36	1234	34.3	203	455	0.446	33	103	0.320	116	161	0.721	37	113	150	4.2	140	3.9	82	1	113	43	15	555	15.4
1992–93	Juwan Howard	36	36	1135	31.5	206	407	0.506	0	2	0.000	112	160	0.700	94	173	267	7.4	69	1.9	99	3	92	21	14	524	14.6
1992–93	Jimmy King	36	36	1174	32.6	148	291	0.509	37	92	0.402	57	88	0.648	58	101	159	4.4	110	3.1	75	2	84	57	19	390	10.8
1992–93	Ray Jackson	29	26	657	22.7	105	213	0.493	2	13	0.154	50	79	0.633	46	72	118	4.1	67	2.3	78	3	53	27	10	262	9.0

1993–94 season
Season	Name	GP	GS	Min	MPG	FG	FGA	FG%	3FG	3FGA	3FG%	FT	FTA	FT%	OR	DR	RB	RPG	Ast	APG	PF	DQ	TO	Stl	Blk	Pts	PPG
1993–94	Jalen Rose	32	32	1154	36.1	220	477	0.461	55	155	0.355	141	192	0.734	53	129	182	5.7	126	3.9	84	2	85	38	6	636	19.9
1993–94	Juwan Howard	30	30	1048	34.9	261	469	0.556	1	7	0.143	102	151	0.675	95	175	270	9	71	2.4	99	5	78	44	21	625	20.8
1993–94	Jimmy King	29	29	932	32.1	139	284	0.489	29	87	0.333	51	79	0.646	49	63	112	3.9	76	2.6	69	3	76	44	12	358	12.3
1993–94	Ray Jackson	31	31	931	30	136	277	0.491	7	34	0.206	75	110	0.682	74	121	195	6.3	82	2.6		5		35	11	354	11.4

1994–95 season
Season	Name	GP	GS	Min	MPG	FG	FGA	FG%	3FG	3FGA	3FG%	FT	FTA	FT%	OR	DR	RB	RPG	Ast	APG	PF	DQ	TO	Stl	Blk	Pts	PPG
1994–95	Ray Jackson	31	31	1040	33.5	177	370	0.478	24	78	0.308	113	146	0.774	64	99	163	5.3	93	3	89	2	115	33	10	491	15.8
1994–95	Jimmy King	31	31	1059	34.2	168	388	0.433	28	109	0.257	93	137	0.679	48	107	155	5	90	2.9	72	0	94	58	5	457	14.7

=== Total stats ===
Cumulative statistics
Player	G	Pts	Reb	Ast	Blk	Stl
King	130	1,541	538	354	45	187
Jackson	125	1,228	579	300	42	119
Rose	102	1,788	477	401	29	119
Howard	100	1,526	749	202	56	79
Webber	70	1,218	702	166	174	103
