= Ray Jackson (basketball) =

Former American college and professional basketball player (born 1973)

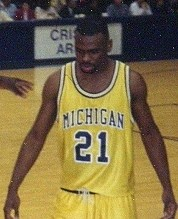
- Jackson in 1993 with the Michigan Wolverines men's basketball team.

Personal information
- Born: 1973 (age 52–53) San Antonio, Texas, U.S.
- Listed height: 6 ft 6 in (1.98 m)
- Listed weight: 220 lb (100 kg)

Career information
- High school: Lyndon B. Johnson (Austin, Texas)
- College: Michigan (1991–1995)
- NBA draft: 1995: undrafted
- Playing career: 1995–2001
- Position: Shooting guard / small forward

Career history
- 1995–1997: Grand Rapids Mackers/Hoops
- 1997–1998: SIG Strasbourg
- 1998–1999: Grand Rapids Hoops
- 1999–2000: Obras Sanitarias
- 2000–2001: Grand Rapids Hoops
- 2001: Cocodrilos de Caracas

Career highlights
- CBA Rookie of the Year (1996); CBA All-Rookie First Team (1996)

Ray Jackson (born 1973) is an American former professional basketball player. He is most well known for his time as a member of the Fab Five with the Michigan Wolverines.

== College career ==
Jackson was part of the famed University of Michigan Wolverines Fab Five along with former NBA players Chris Webber, Jimmy King, Jalen Rose, and Juwan Howard that reached the 1992 & 1993 NCAA Men's Division I Basketball Championship games as both Freshmen and Sophomores.

Although the Fab Five’s Final Four appearances were vacated, he was not among the players called before the grand jury (Robert Traylor, Webber, Rose, Maurice Taylor and Louis Bullock) in the Ed Martin scandal and was not found to have received large amounts of money.

Jackson and King were the only two members of the Fab Five to stay at Michigan for their full four years of eligibility; Webber left after his sophomore year and Rose and Howard after their junior years. Jackson's best season at Michigan came in his senior year, as he averaged a team-high of nearly 16 points per game.

== Professional career ==
Known for his time as a member of the Fab Five, Jackson was not drafted by an NBA team and never played in the league. He was cut in preseason by the New York Knicks before the 1995–96 season and cut by the Detroit Pistons before the 1996–97 season. He was drafted in the Continental Basketball Association (CBA) by the Grand Rapids Hoops #35 in the 3rd round in 1995.

While with the Hoops, he won the 1995–96 CBA Rookie of the Year Award.

He then played in France with Pro A team SIG Basket, in Argentina in the Liga Nacional de Básquet with Obras Sanitarias (where he averaged 16 points per game) and Venezuela with Cocodrilos de Caracas.

In a February 10, 2007 article on Yahoo Sports, Jackson says that: "It took me a long time to get over the fact that I was the only one that didn't make it to the NBA from the Fab Five, but I'm over it because I'm back home and I'm happy with what I'm doing with my life."

== Post-basketball career ==
Jackson lives in Austin, Texas, where he runs a moving company and Rise Up, a not-for-profit organization that assists children socially, educationally and on the basketball court. He also works for Lyndon B. Johnson High School as a Specialist Attendance Officer.
