= Maurice Taylor =

American basketball player (born 1976)

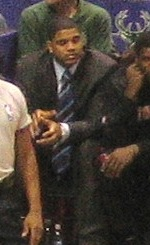
- Taylor with the New York Knicks in 2006

Personal information
- Born: October 30, 1976 (age 50) Detroit, Michigan, U.S.
- Listed height: 6 ft 9 in (2.06 m)
- Listed weight: 265 lb (120 kg)

Career information
- High school: Henry Ford (Detroit, Michigan)
- College: Michigan (1994–1997)
- NBA draft: 1997: 1st round, 14th overall pick
- Drafted by: Los Angeles Clippers
- Playing career: 1997–2011
- Position: Power forward / center
- Number: 23, 2, 24

Career history
- 1997–2000: Los Angeles Clippers
- 2000–2005: Houston Rockets
- 2005–2006: New York Knicks
- 2006–2007: Sacramento Kings
- 2009: Olimpia Milano
- 2009–2010: Shanxi Zhongyu
- 2010: Benetton Treviso

Career highlights
- NBA All-Rookie Second Team (1998); Big Ten Freshman of the Year (1995); Third-team Parade All-American (1994)
- Stats at NBA.com
- Stats at Basketball Reference

Maurice De Shawn Taylor (born October 30, 1976) is an American former professional basketball player. He played power forward and center positions. Originally from Detroit, Taylor played college basketball for the Michigan Wolverines and was selected by the Los Angeles Clippers as the 14th overall pick in the 1997 NBA draft. Taylor played from 1997 to 2007 in the NBA for the Clippers, Houston Rockets, New York Knicks, and Sacramento Kings. From 2009 to 2011, Taylor played internationally in Italy and China.

== College career ==
Taylor attended the University of Michigan. The athletic forward, from Henry Ford High School in Detroit, burst onto the national scene during the 1994 Maui Invitational with fellow freshman Maceo Baston. He won Big Ten Freshman of the Year for the 1994–1995 season, averaging 12.4 points and 5.1 rebounds and playing in the NCAA Tournament. As a sophomore, he averaged 14 points and 7 rebounds and was picked 2nd Team All-Big Ten. Off the court that year, Taylor was involved in a traffic accident while out with potential recruit Mateen Cleaves that left teammate Robert Traylor with a broken arm and that led to the University of Michigan basketball scandal. After considering entering the NBA draft, Taylor returned to help lead a talented (if underachieving) Michigan team to the 1997 NIT Championship while averaging 12.3 points and 6.2 rebounds.

== Professional career ==
=== NBA ===
In 1997, he was drafted 14th overall by the Los Angeles Clippers. In 2000, Taylor told the Clippers he would not re-sign with them in free agency or accept any sign-and-trade situations. When he became a free agent, Taylor announced his intention of hoping to sign with the Orlando Magic to join newly acquired players Grant Hill and Tracy McGrady. No contract offer from Orlando ever came. He then signed with the Houston Rockets instead. He was then traded to the New York Knicks in 2005, before joining the Sacramento Kings in 2006. He was released on January 23, 2007.

=== Europe ===
In January 2009, he joined the Italian Euroleague club Olimpia Milano. He had not played since January 2007. In February 2011 he signed with Enel Brindisi until the end of the season, but reached a consensual termination of the contract with the club in April 2011.

== Booster scandal ==
Years after the completion of his college career, Taylor, along with several other Michigan stars, was accused of taking money from booster Ed Martin. Due to concerns that Taylor's amateur status had been compromised, Michigan forfeited every game in which Taylor played, and scrubbed his records from its record books. The school was also forced to disassociate itself from Taylor until 2012.

However, he was in the stands in New York with another former Wolverine, Jalen Rose, to support the team during the 2006 NIT Final Four.

== Personal ==
Through his mother, Taylor is of Italian descent.

== See also ==
- List of people banned or suspended by the NBA
