= 1992 Big Eight Conference men's basketball tournament =

- Classification: Division I
- Season: 1991–92
- Teams: 8
- Finals site: Kemper Arena; Kansas City, MO
- Champions: Kansas (4th title)
- Winning coach: Roy Williams (1st title)
- MVP: Byron Houston (Oklahoma State)

1991–92 Big Eight Conference men's basketball standings
	Conf.				Overall
Team	W		L	PCT	W		L	PCT
No. 2 Kansas †	11	–	3	.786	27	–	5	.844
No. 11 Oklahoma State	8	–	6	.571	28	–	8	.778
No. 16 Missouri	8	–	6	.571	21	–	9	.700
No. 23 Oklahoma	8	–	6	.571	21	–	9	.700
Nebraska	7	–	7	.500	19	–	10	.655
Iowa State	5	–	9	.357	21	–	13	.618
Kansas State	5	–	9	.357	16	–	14	.533
Colorado	4	–	10	.286	13	–	15	.464
† 1992 Big Eight tournament winner As of April 6, 1992; Rankings from AP poll

The 1992 Big Eight Conference men's basketball tournament was held March 13–15 at Kemper Arena in Kansas City, Missouri.

Top-seeded Kansas defeated #2 seed Oklahoma State in the championship game, 66–57, to earn the conference's automatic bid to the 1992 NCAA tournament.

== Bracket ==
Quarterfinals; Friday, March 13
1	#3 Kansas	84
8	Colorado	66
4	#24 Oklahoma	107
5	Nebraska	85
3	#13 Missouri	75
6	Iowa State	80
7	Kansas State	57
2	#11 Oklahoma State	81

Semifinals; Saturday, March 14
1	#3 Kansas	85
4	#24 Oklahoma	67
6	Iowa State	60
2	#11 Oklahoma State	69

Championship; Sunday, March 15
1	#3 Kansas	66
2	#11 Oklahoma State	57
