= Roy Williams (basketball coach) =

American basketball player and coach (born 1950)

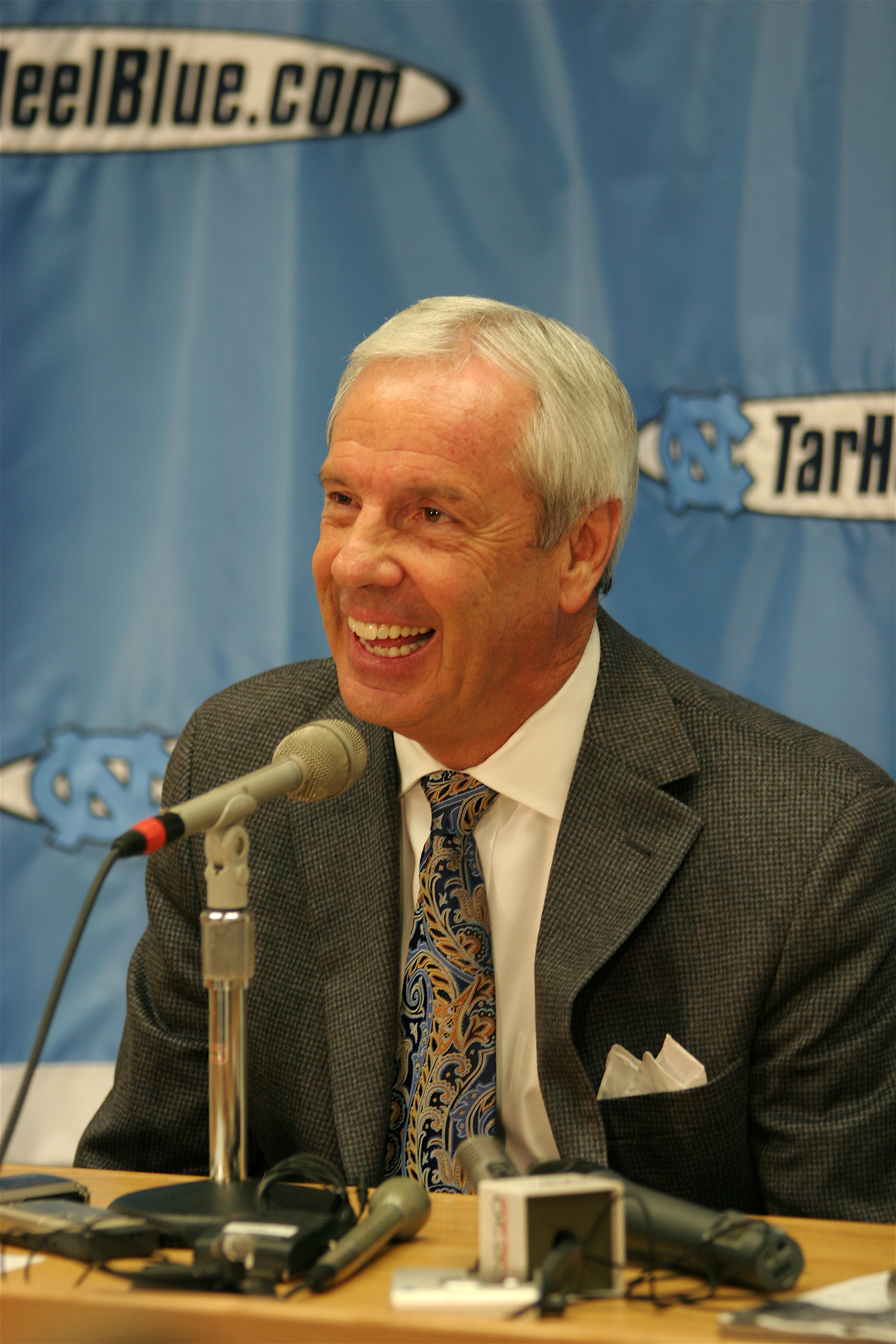
- Williams in 2008

Biographical details
- Born: August 1, 1950 (age 76); Marion, North Carolina, U.S.
- Education: North Carolina (1972)

Playing career
- 1968–1969: North Carolina (J.V.)

Coaching career (HC unless noted)
- 1973–1978: Charles D. Owen HS
- 1978–1988: North Carolina (assistant)
- 1988–2003: Kansas
- 2003–2021: North Carolina

Head coaching record
- Overall: 903–264 (.774)
- Tournaments: 79–27 (NCAA Division I); 4–1 (NIT)

Accomplishments and honors

Championships
- 3 NCAA Division I tournament (2005, 2009, 2017); 9 NCAA Division I regional – Final Four (1991, 1993, 2002, 2003, 2005, 2008, 2009, 2016, 2017); Big Eight tournament (1992); 5 Big Eight regular season (1991–1993, 1995, 1996); 3 Big 12 tournament (1997–1999); 4 Big 12 regular season (1997, 1998, 2002, 2003); 3 ACC tournament (2007, 2008, 2016); 9 ACC regular season (2005, 2007–2009, 2011, 2012, 2016, 2017, 2019)

Awards
- USA Today Sports National Coach of the Year (2019); 2× AP Coach of the Year (1992, 2006); 2× Henry Iba Award (1990, 2006); Naismith College Coach of the Year (1997); Adolph Rupp Cup (2006); John R. Wooden Legends of Coaching Award (2003); 4× Big Eight Coach of the Year (1990, 1992, 1995, 1996); 3× Big 12 Coach of the Year (1997, 2002, 2003); 2× ACC Coach of the Year (2006, 2011)
- Basketball Hall of Fame; Inducted in 2007 (profile)
- College Basketball Hall of Fame; Inducted in 2006
Medal record
Men's basketball
Representing United States
Olympic Games
Assistant coach for United States
Bronze medal – third place	2004 Athens	Men's basketball
FIBA Americas Championship
Assistant coach for United States
Gold medal – first place	2003 San Juan	Men's basketball

Roy Allen Williams (born August 1, 1950) is an American retired college basketball coach who served as the men's head coach for the North Carolina Tar Heels for 18 seasons and the Kansas Jayhawks for 15 seasons. He was inducted into the College Basketball Hall of Fame in 2006 and the Basketball Hall of Fame in 2007.

Williams started his college coaching career at UNC Chapel Hill as an assistant coach for Dean Smith in 1978. Four years later, the North Carolina Tar Heels won the national championship. After 10 years as Smith's assistant, Williams became head coach at defending national champion Kansas, in 1988, taking them to 14 consecutive NCAA tournaments, four Final Four appearances, two national championship game appearances, collecting an .805 winning percentage, and winning nine conference titles.

In 2003, Williams left Kansas to return to his alma mater UNC Chapel Hill, replacing Matt Doherty as head coach of the Tar Heels. In an 18-year period at Chapel Hill, Williams won three national championships, reached a total of five Final Fours, finished first in the Atlantic Coast Conference regular-season standings nine times, won three ACC tournament championships, one AP National Coach of the Year award, and two ACC Coach of the Year awards. He is third all-time for most wins at Kansas behind Phog Allen and Bill Self, and second all-time for most wins at Chapel Hill behind his legendary mentor, Dean Smith. On January 25, 2020, with a 94–71 win over Miami, Williams reached 880 wins surpassing Smith's 879 win total.

With a total of 903 wins, Williams took his teams to nine Final Fours in his careers at Kansas and UNC Chapel Hill. Williams is the fifth NCAA Men's Division I head coach to reach 900 wins, and reached the mark in fewer games than any other head coach with 900+ wins. He is the only coach in NCAA history to have led two different programs to at least four Final Fours each and the only basketball coach in NCAA history to have 400 or more victories at two NCAA Division I schools. He is also 14th all-time in the NCAA in win percentage among men's college basketball coaches.

With Williams as an assistant coach under Smith, the North Carolina Tar Heels won the 1982 national championship. As a head coach, Williams coached in a total of six NCAA championship games (1991, 2003, 2005, 2009, 2016, and 2017) including both Kansas and Chapel Hill. On April 4, 2005, Williams won the first national championship of his career as the Tar Heels defeated the University of Illinois in the 2005 NCAA championship game. He again led the Tar Heels to a national title on April 6, 2009, against Michigan State. Williams won his third and final national championship on April 3, 2017, when he led the Tar Heels to victory against the Gonzaga Bulldogs. Williams is one of six NCAA Men's Division I college basketball coaches to have won at least three national championships.

== Early years ==
Williams was born in Marion, North Carolina, and spent his early years in the small western North Carolina towns of Marion and Spruce Pine. As a child his family relocated to nearby Asheville, where he grew up. Williams lettered in basketball and baseball at T. C. Roberson High School in Asheville, North Carolina, all four years. In basketball, playing for Coach Buddy Baldwin, he was named all-county and all-conference for two years (1967 and 1968), all-western North Carolina in 1968 and served as captain in the North Carolina Blue-White All-Star Game. Williams has stated that Coach Baldwin was one of the biggest influences in his life.

Williams went on to play on the freshman team at the University of North Carolina at Chapel Hill and study the game under coach Dean Smith. When Williams was a sophomore at UNC Chapel Hill, he asked Smith if he could attend his practices and would sit in the bleachers taking notes on Smith's coaching. Williams also volunteered to keep statistics for Smith at home games and worked in Smith's summer camps.

== Coaching career ==
=== Early coaching years ===
Williams' first coaching job was in 1973 as a high school basketball and golf coach at Charles D. Owen High School in Black Mountain, North Carolina. He coached basketball and boys' golf for five years and ninth-grade football for four years, and served as athletic director for two years.

In 1978, Williams came back to the University of North Carolina at Chapel Hill and served as an assistant to Dean Smith from 1978 to 1988. During his tenure as assistant coach, UNC Chapel Hill went 275–61 and won the NCAA national championship in 1982, the first for Smith and the second for UNC Chapel Hill. One of Williams' more notable events came as assistant coach when he became instrumental in recruiting Michael Jordan.

=== Kansas ===
In 1988, Williams became the head coach at Kansas basketball. Weeks after Williams took the position, KU was placed on probation for violations that took place prior to his arrival. As a result, the Jayhawks were banned from postseason play for the 1988–89 season.

Williams coached 15 seasons at Kansas, from 1988 to 2003. During that time he had a record of 418–101, a .805 winning percentage. At the time of his departure, he was second on Kansas' all-time wins list behind only Phog Allen; he has since been passed by current coach Bill Self. Williams' Kansas teams averaged 27.8 wins per season.

Kansas won nine regular-season conference championships over his last 13 years. In seven years of Big 12 Conference play, his teams went 94–18, capturing the regular-season title in 1997, 1998, 2002 and 2003 and the postseason tournament crown in 1997, 1998 and 1999. In 2001–02, KU became the first, and only team to go undefeated (16–0) in Big 12 play. In 1995–98, Kansas was a combined 123–17, an average of 30.8 wins per season. Williams' teams went 201–17 (.922) in Allen Fieldhouse, and won 62 consecutive games in Allen from February 1994 to December 1998. Kansas was a regular in the Associated Press Top 25 from 1991 to 1999, placing in the poll for 145 consecutive weeks. Williams' teams were ranked in the Top 10 in 194 AP polls from 1990.

Kansas led the nation in field goal percentage and scoring in 2002 and in scoring margin in 2003; they held opponents to the lowest field goal percentage in the country in 2001 (37.8 percent); led the nation in winning percentage in 1997 and 2002; shot better than 50 percent from the floor for the season seven times; and led the country in field goal percentage in 1990 at 53.3 percent, and in 2002 at 50.6 percent; shot a combined 49.4 percent from the floor in 15 seasons; led the nation in assists in 2001 and 2002 and was seventh in the nation in 2003; scored 100 or more points 71 times (once every 13 games); averaged 82.7 points per game in 15 years; averaged 90 or more points in two seasons (92.1 in 1990 and 90.9 in 2002). Kansas was also the winningest team of the 1990s, despite failing to win any NCAA championships during the decade.

Williams had Kansas in the AP Top 25 in 242 of 268 weekly polls. Kansas reached the No. 1 ranking in the country in six different seasons and was ranked at least No. 2 in the nation in 11 of the 15 seasons.

Under Williams, the team had several deep runs in the NCAA Tournament, making it to four Final Fours and appearing in the national championship game in both 1991 and 2003, losing both, to Duke and Syracuse respectively. The 1996–97 team featured future NBA players Paul Pierce, Jacque Vaughn, Raef LaFrentz, and Scot Pollard. Entering the NCAA Tournament with Pollard (foot stress fracture) and starting shooting guard (later Kansas and UNC assistant coach, and former head coach at Stanford) Jerod Haase (broken wrist) trying to play with injuries, the team was upset in the Sweet Sixteen by the eventual champion, the Arizona Wildcats.

Except for his first season at Kansas (when the team was on probation), all of Williams' teams made the NCAA tournament. From 1990 to 1999 Kansas compiled a 286–60 record, giving them both the most wins and best winning percentage of any team in that decade. From 1994 to 1998, the Jayhawks won 62 consecutive home games at Allen Fieldhouse, which was the longest such streak in the NCAA at the time. The seniors of 1998 (LaFrentz, Billy Thomas, and C. B. McGrath) went 58–0 at home during their KU careers.

Williams took the 2003 Kansas team to the NCAA championship game against Syracuse. Syracuse defeated Kansas, 81–78, to win the championship. On April 13, Williams announced that he would be leaving Kansas for the North Carolina coaching position, having been courted for it once before in 2000, stating "There's several factors [for my decision] -- my roots, my dream and my family. And I think all three things are my factors. And I don't mind saying this, but there's Coach [Dean] Smith. It's hard saying 'no' to him twice."

=== UNC Chapel Hill ===
Williams accepted the North Carolina Tar Heels head coaching position. He left Kansas as the second-winningest coach in school history, behind only Hall of Famer Phog Allen, who, like Williams, is a member of a coaching tree dating back to the game's inventor, James Naismith. However, he has since been passed by current coach Bill Self.

With Williams' return to UNC Chapel Hill, he became the school's third coach in six years. The previous two coaches, Smith and Frank McGuire, had covered a 45-year period. The Tar Heels were coming off of a mediocre season and two years before had suffered the worst season in school history. Nevertheless, the team still had top talent, including McDonald's All Americans Sean May, Rashad McCants, and Raymond Felton. In Williams' first season as the Tar Heels' head coach, the 2003–04 season, Chapel Hill finished a respectable 19–11 and returned to the national rankings for the first time since the early part of the 2002–03 season. They were knocked out in the second round of the NCAA tournament by Texas.

==== 2004–05: First championship ====
In Williams' second year, the Tar Heels returned to national prominence. With the arrival of freshman Marvin Williams, Williams led Chapel Hill to a National Championship in 2005, which was his first national title as a head coach.

==== 2005–08 ====
After winning the championship, the team's top seven scorers all left, either via graduation or opting to go to the NBA early. Despite the loss of talent, the Tar Heels proved to be surprisingly successful in 2005–06, in part due to freshman Tyler Hansbrough. Williams was named Coach of the Year for his ability to turn around such a new team to such a high level of success.

Williams quickly reloaded the team with top talent, bringing in recruits like Brandan Wright, Ty Lawson, Wayne Ellington, and Deon Thompson. On December 9, 2006, Williams won his 500th game with a 94–69 win over High Point. The 2006–07 team tied as ACC regular season champions, earning the tiebreak over the Virginia Cavaliers. With the #1 seed, the Tar Heels won the ACC tournament. After earning a #1 seed in the East Region in the 2007 NCAA Tournament, Williams' team won its first-round game against Eastern Kentucky Colonels 86–65 and its second against Michigan State 81–67. Chapel Hill then defeated the USC Trojans 74–64 to advance to the Elite Eight. On March 24, 2007, Chapel Hill fell to the Georgetown Hoyas in overtime in the East Regional, ending its post-season run. Following the 2006–2007 season, Williams announced on July 18, 2007, that he had vertigo, a condition that occasionally forces him to sit down suddenly during games.

The 2007–08 season was just as successful, culminating in another ACC regular season and tournament championship. Williams led the Tar Heels to a school-record 36 wins, the #1 overall ranking in the final AP poll, a #1 seed in the East Region of the tournament, the tournament's overall #1 seed, and the 2008 Final Four. The Tar Heels' run ended with an 84–66 loss in the Final Four to Kansas, Williams' former team. Two days after the defeat, he attended the tournament final between Kansas and Memphis, sporting a Jayhawk sticker on his shirt.

==== 2008–09: Second championship ====
With Tyler Hansbrough returning to Chapel Hill for his senior season, they were tapped by numerous prognosticators as the favorites to win the NCAA championship. The Tar Heels started the season #1 in both polls—including the first-ever unanimous preseason #1 ranking in the history of the AP Poll—becoming the first team to have back-to-back preseason #1 rankings since UNLV in 1991. They won their first 13 games before being upset by Boston College 85–78. Two games later, they fell at ACC rival Wake Forest 92–89, but went on a winning streak, including a defeat of archrival Duke by 101–87, Williams' fourth straight victory at Cameron Indoor Stadium. In defeating Duke 79–71 in the season finale, the Tar Heels secured their third straight ACC regular season title and fourth in Williams' six seasons as head coach at UNC. Although they lost in the second round of the ACC Tournament to Florida State, they still garnered the top seed in the NCAA South Region—the fourth time in Williams' six-year tenure in Chapel Hill that the Tar Heels had been a #1 seed. Chapel Hill defeated Radford in the first round of the NCAA tournament, then LSU in the second round, and Gonzaga in the Sweet 16 round, followed by a 72–60 defeat of the Oklahoma Sooners in the Elite 8 that gave North Carolina its second straight berth into the Final Four in Detroit, Michigan. An 83–69 victory over Villanova vaulted the Tar Heels into the national championship game. They played the Michigan State Spartans in the National Championship game and Williams won his second title with an 89–72 victory. This capped off one of the most dominating runs in the history of the tournament. The Tar Heels only trailed for a total of 10 minutes out of a possible 240 minutes of playing time. They also won every game by at least 12 points—all the more remarkable since they upended four teams in the top 15 of the final AP Poll (#10 Gonzaga, #7 Oklahoma, #11 Villanova and #8 Michigan State).

==== 2009–16 ====
In 2010 an academic scandal that began during the tenure of Coach Dean Smith started to be uncovered. The University of North Carolina academic-athletic scandal involved alleged fraud and academic dishonesty committed at the University of North Carolina at Chapel Hill (UNC Chapel Hill). The scandal involved basketball players as well as other athletes taking independent study classes to boost their GPAs to meet academic eligibility. UNC Chapel Hill defended this practice, saying the classes were open to regular students, not just athletes. The Tar Heels finished the regular season at 16–15, dropped to third in all-time wins, and bowed out in the first round of the ACC tournament. On November 29, 2009, Williams won his 600th game with an 80–73 win over Nevada. The Tar Heels did not receive a post-season tournament bid by the NCAA—the only time in Williams' coaching career that his team didn't take part in that tournament when eligible to do so. However, they did receive a bid to the NIT. The Tar Heels made it to the NIT championship game versus Dayton, which was played on April 1, 2010, at Madison Square Garden. The Tar Heels lost by a score of 79–68, bringing their overall tally to 20–17 for the 2009–10 season. This 20-win season however kept Williams' streak of 20-win seasons alive. Williams stated that the season was "the biggest frustration and the biggest disappointment of my professional life". In addition to frustrating play, Williams was criticized for comparing the season to the disaster in Haiti by stating, "Our massage therapist told me, she said 'You know, Coach, what happened in Haiti is a catastrophe. What you're having is a disappointment.' And I told her that depends on which chair she was sitting in, because it does feel like a catastrophe to me, and that's because it is my life." Williams later apologized for his comments, stating that he misspoke and "neglected to say that it puts basketball in perspective."

The Tar Heels started out slow during the 2010–11 season, dropping early games to Minnesota, Vanderbilt, and Illinois, and also being blown out by twenty points at Georgia Tech. It was not until Williams made the difficult decision to start freshman point guard Kendall Marshall over junior Larry Drew II that the Tar Heels returned to their dominant winning ways. The Heels won the ACC Regular Season Championship after beating Duke in their final regular season game in Chapel Hill. It was Chapel Hill's fifth ACC Regular Season title in eight years under Coach Williams. However, Chapel Hill lost to Duke a week later in the ACC Tournament Championship game. Coach Williams was selected as the ACC Coach of the Year for the second time since becoming head coach at UNC Chapel Hill for overcoming the adversity of losing some players to transfer and dismissal and winning the ACC regular season title. After defeating Long Island, Washington, and Marquette, the Tar Heels (29–8, 14–2) lost to the Kentucky Wildcats in the Elite Eight.

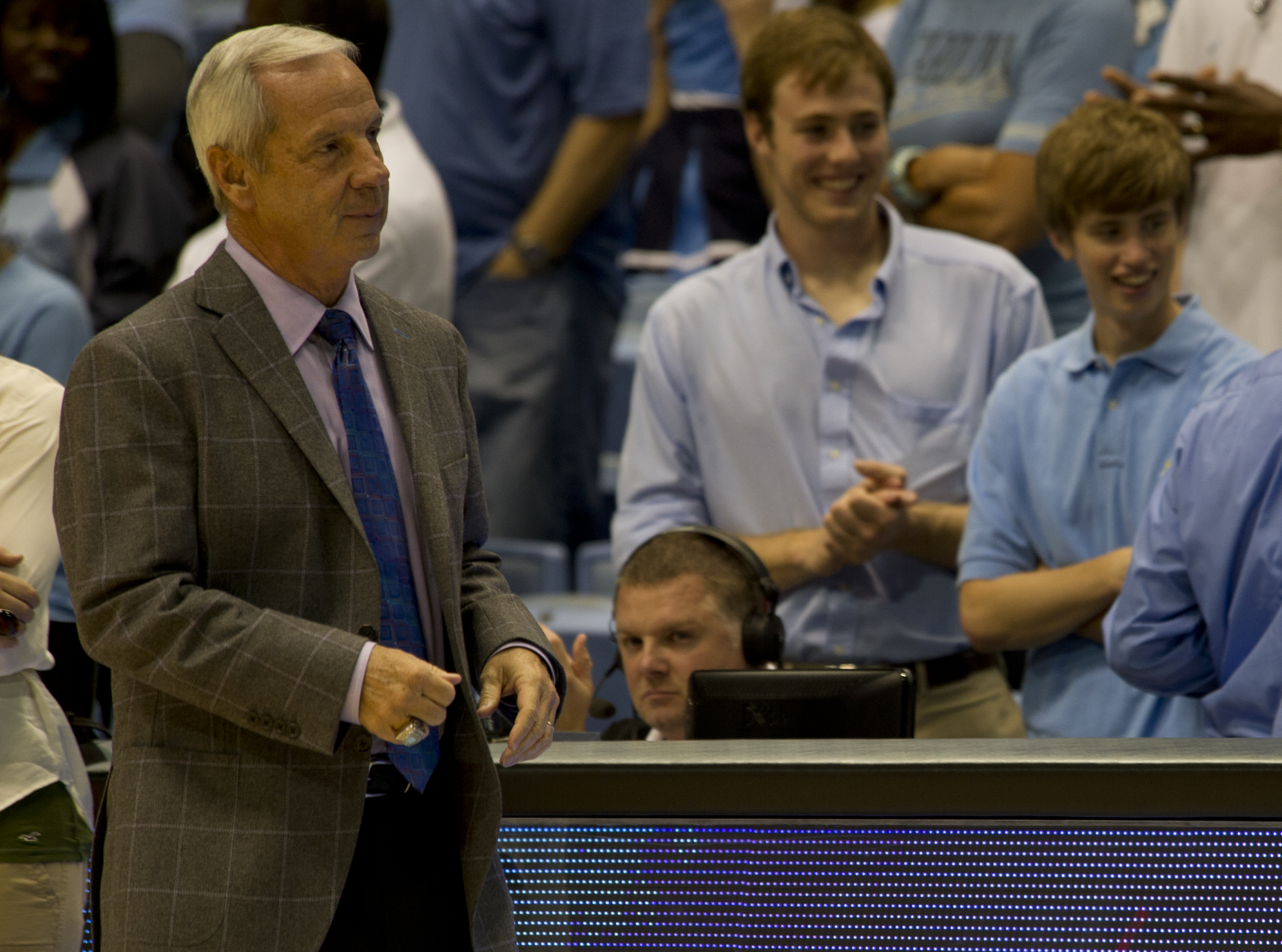
Williams in 2011.

The 2011–12 season for the Tar Heels was more successful despite numerous injuries to key players. With losses to UNLV, Kentucky as well as a 33-point defeat against Florida State, Williams guided his Heels to another ACC Regular Season Championship after defeating Duke at Cameron Indoor Stadium to close out the regular season (Duke won the first meeting in Chapel Hill). UNC Chapel Hill entered the 2012 ACC Tournament as the #1 seed. The Tar Heels beat Maryland in the quarterfinals and NC State in the semifinals. John Henson injured his wrist in the Maryland game and did not play in the semifinals or championship game where Chapel Hill lost to Florida State, 85–83. Chapel Hill was then awarded the #1 seed in the Midwest bracket of the 2012 NCAA Tournament. Without Henson, Dexter Strickland and sixth-man Leslie McDonald (who were both sidelined with season-ending injuries) the Tar Heels beat Vermont in the second round of the Tournament. Henson returned to the lineup for the third-round game against Creighton. The Heels defeated Creighton, however starting point guard Kendall Marshall injured his wrist in the second half of that game. Marshall had to undergo surgery and was unable to play for the rest of the season. The Tar Heels turned to first-year point guard Stilman White who helped lead the Heels to an OT win over the Ohio Bobcats in the Sweet 16. Carolina then faced #2 seed Kansas in the Elite Eight. Greatly undermanned, the Heels played Kansas close but Kansas pulled ahead late for the win. Roy Williams' 2011–2012 team finished the season with a record of 32–6, 14–2 in the ACC.

The 2012–13 season for Roy Williams and his Tar Heels was a great surprise with respect to a new starting lineup in the latter half of the season. Unlike traditional teams at Chapel Hill, the Tar Heels played more guard heavy and relied mostly on their perimeter game to score points. Coach Williams reached 700 total NCAA career head coaching victories after the Tar Heels beat Villanova 78–71 in the opening round of the tournament. Unfortunately, the Tar Heels were not able to advance after a 70–58 loss to Kansas in the round of 32. It marked the third time Chapel Hill had lost to the Jayhawks during March Madness since 2008. The Tar Heels completed their season with 25 wins and 11 losses (overall) including 12 wins and six losses against conference opponents.

The 2013–14 season for the Tar Heels ended with a round of 32 loss to Iowa State in the NCAA Tournament after narrowly slipping past Providence in the opening round. The overall record ended up 24–10, which included a 13–5 conference record.

John R. Wooden Award candidate Marcus Paige came back for his junior season. With early season losses to unranked Butler and Iowa, the Tar Heels intensity and strength were questioned. The Tar Heels grabbed a four seed in the NCAA Tournament with wins against Harvard and Arkansas, but ended their run with a loss to Wisconsin in the Sweet Sixteen. The Tar Heels finished their season 26–12 with an 11–7 ACC record.

During the 2015–16 season, Williams guided the Tar Heels to their fourth Final Four of his tenure, as well as winning the regular season and ACC tournament titles.

In the 2016 NCAA tournament, the Tar Heels beat Florida Gulf Coast, Providence, Indiana, and Notre Dame, and Syracuse in the Final Four, to earn a spot against Villanova in the national championship game. North Carolina lost 77–74 when Villanova sank a three-point buzzer beater. The Tar Heels completed their season with a 33–7 overall record.

=== 2016–17: Third championship ===
Williams led the Tar Heels to their second consecutive ACC regular season championship. On January 16, 2017, Williams won his 800th game as a head coach after defeating Syracuse 85–68. Justin Jackson won ACC Player of the Year. In the 2017 NCAA Tournament, UNC Chapel Hill defeated Texas Southern 103–64, Arkansas 72–65, Butler 92–80, Kentucky 75–73, Oregon 77–76 and Gonzaga 71–65 to win its third national title in the Roy Williams' era. The Tar Heels completed their season again with a 33–7 overall record.

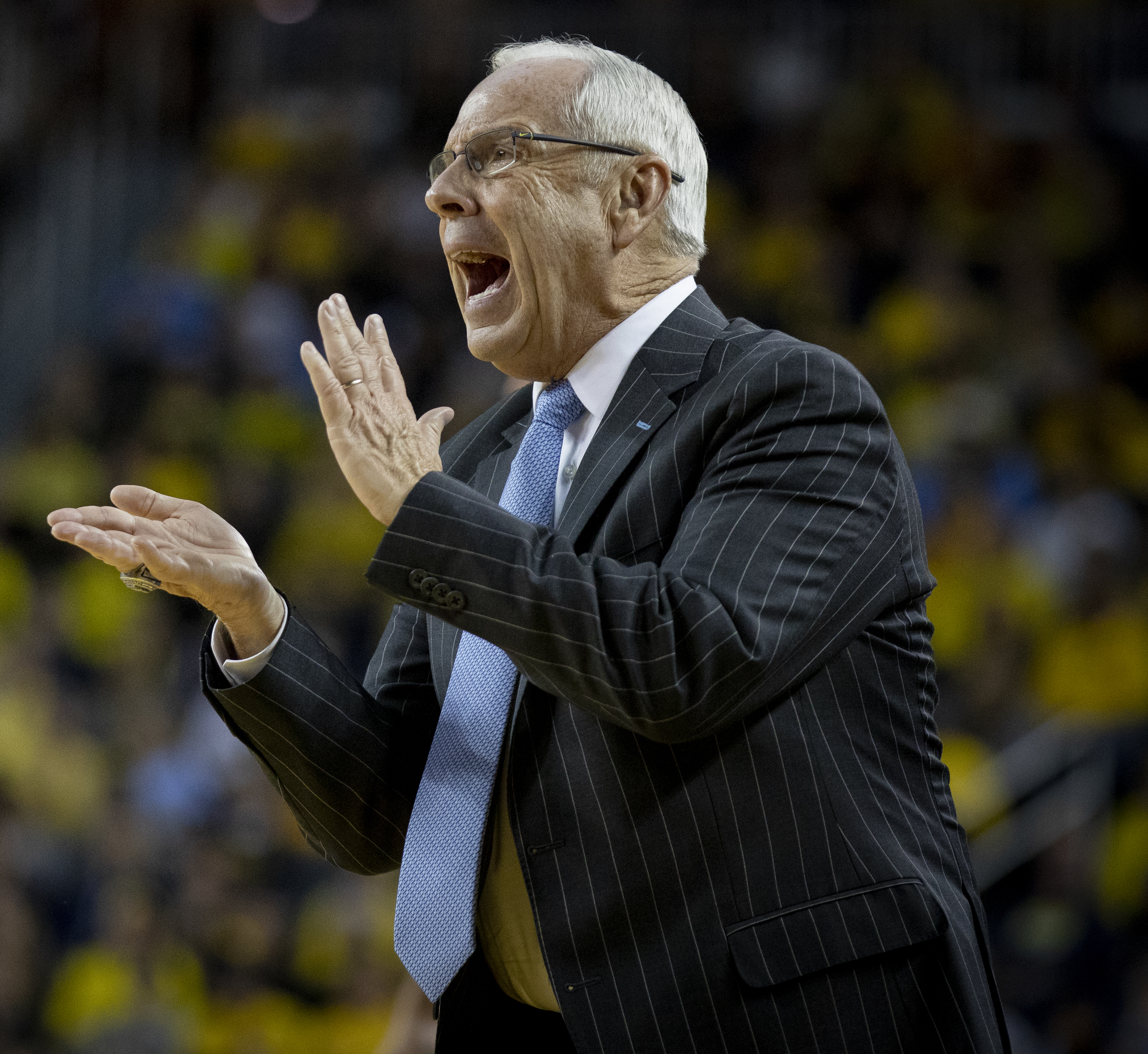
Williams in 2018.

=== 2017–2021 ===
On February 12, 2018, in a Chapel Hill home win against Notre Dame, Williams garnered the same number of wins (418) in the same number of seasons (15) that he accumulated at Kansas.

Chapel Hill lost 86–65 to Texas A&M in the Second Round of the NCAA Tournament.

Despite a slow start to the season, the Tar Heels had another impressive ACC conference record in the Williams era. After a dismal 21 point loss to the Louisville Cardinals, the Tar Heels would lose only one more game, finishing the regular season 26–5 overall, 16–2 in the ACC, tied atop the conference with the Virginia Cavaliers. Season highlights include a sweep of rivals Duke and North Carolina State as well as going 9–0 in conference road games. Adding great and consistent offensive production during the season, Coby White averaged 16.1 PPG in his freshman year as a Tar Heel. Williams was named the USA TODAY Sports National Coach of the Year.

The Tar Heels made it to the Sweet Sixteen of the NCAA tournament before falling to 5 seed Auburn 97–80.

On November 27, 2019, Williams tied Adolph Rupp for 5th in all-time wins with his 876th career victory after a win over Alabama 76–67. He took sole possession of 5th place in all-time wins with his 877th victory with a 78–74 win over Oregon two days later in the consolation game of the Battle 4 Atlantis tournament.

On December 30, 2019, Williams tied Dean Smith for 4th in all-time wins with his 879th career victory after a win over Yale 70–67, and on January 25, 2020, the Tar Heels defeated Miami in Chapel Hill 94–71. The victory brought Williams to a total of 880 career wins, moving him past Smith and placing him fourth on the NCAA's all-time Division I coaching wins list, behind only Bob Knight, Jim Boeheim, and Mike Krzyzewski.

The Tar Heels concluded the regular season with a 13-18 (6-14) record, losing eight games by four points or fewer. The Tar Heels lost to Syracuse in the ACC Tournament, the last ACC game played before the season and post-season were cancelled due to the COVID-19 pandemic, finishing 14-19 and giving Williams his first losing season in his college coaching career.

On February 27, 2021, Williams won his 900th game, becoming the fastest men’s coach to reach the milestone in D-1 history, after an upset win over #11 Florida St., 78–70, in Chapel Hill.

On March 11, 2021, Williams won his 903rd game, passing coach Bobby Knight for third on the all-time D-1 wins list after a win over Virginia Tech 81–73 in the quarterfinals of the ACC Tournament.

The Tar Heels concluded the season with a blowout loss to Wisconsin 85–62 in the first round of the NCAA tournament. The loss marked the first time Williams had lost in this round in his head coaching career, dropping him to 29-1 all time in NCAA tournament first-round games.

On April 1, 2021, Williams announced his retirement after 48 years as a coach, 33 as a head coach and 18 years at UNC Chapel Hill. His overall record was 903–264 (.774), including going 418–101 (.805) at Kansas, and 485–163 (.748) at Chapel Hill). The university held a press conference that afternoon which was attended by several current and former Tar Heel coaches, players, and members of the university community. He was replaced four days later by one of his assistant coaches, Hubert Davis, whom Williams had been mentoring for a head coaching job much like Dean Smith had done to him.

== Personal life ==
He and his wife Wanda have a son and a daughter. His son, Scott, played at Chapel Hill in 1997–98 and 1998–99.

In 2009, Algonquin Books published Williams' autobiography, Hard Work: A Life On and Off the Court, co-written by Tim Crothers. In the book, Williams discusses his life, including that of his difficult childhood, the highs and lows of his successful coaching career and the difficult and agonizing decision to leave Kansas for UNC Chapel Hill in 2003.

Williams had surgery September 19, 2012 to remove a tumor from his right kidney.

In March 2021, Williams and his wife Wanda donated $3 million to the University of North Carolina at Chapel Hill, to support various scholarships for UNC Chapel Hill. Williams also donated $600,000 in the wake of the COVID-19 pandemic to provide scholarships for an extra year of eligibility for Chapel Hill spring sport athletes who had their 2020 seasons cut short.

Roy and Wanda Williams built a home in Flat Rock, Henderson County, North Carolina in 2012; they moved there after Roy's retirement.

== Awards ==
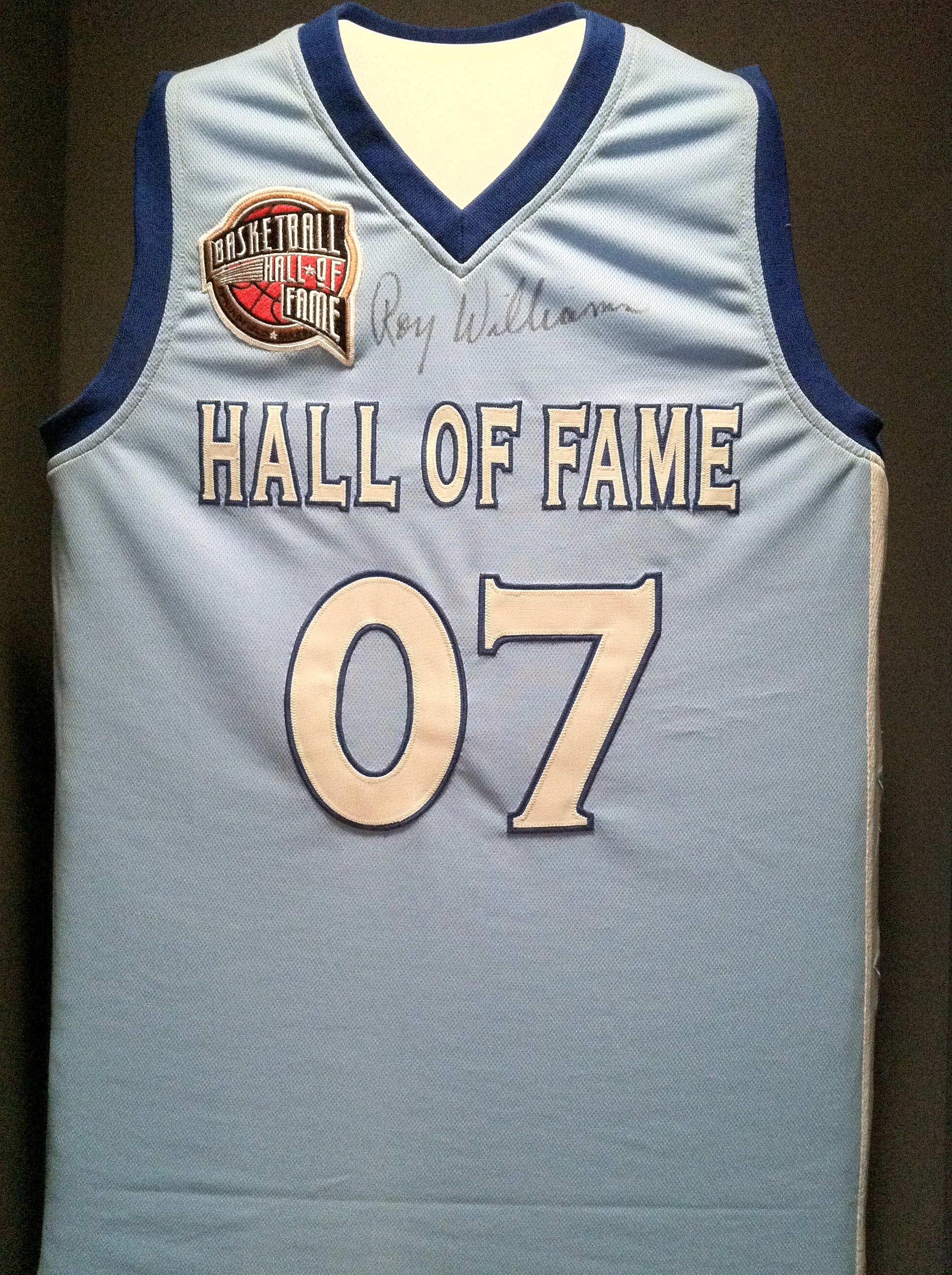
Basketball Hall of Fame Jersey on display at the North Carolina Sport Hall of Fame

- Big Eight Coach of the Year (1990, 1992, 1995, 1996)
- Henry Iba Award (1990, 2006)
- The Associated Press Coach of the Year award twice. He was first honored in 1992 with the Kansas Jayhawks. He was recognized at UNC Chapel Hill in 2006, as he had a surprisingly successful season after losing 96% of the 2005 championship squad's scoring productivity. He is only the seventh coach in history to win the award twice and the second to do it at two different schools.
- Naismith College Coach of the Year (1997)
- Big 12 Coach of the Year (1997, 2002, 2003)
- John R. Wooden Legends of Coaching Award (2003)
- ACC Coach of the Year (2006, 2011)
- Roy Williams was elected to the Basketball Hall of Fame in 2007.
- Williams was named by Forbes as America's Best College Basketball Coach in February 2009
- Sporting News named Williams Coach of the Decade for the 2000s.
- In December 2009 Seth Davis at Sports Illustrated nominated Williams as one of the coaches of the decade.
- USA Today National Coach of the Year (2019)

== Head coaching record ==
Record table
Season	Team	Overall	Conference	Standing	Postseason
Kansas Jayhawks (Big Eight Conference) (1988–1996)
1988–89	Kansas	19–12	6–8	6th	
1989–90	Kansas	30–5	11–3	T–2nd	NCAA Division I Round of 32
1990–91	Kansas	27–8	10–4	T–1st	NCAA Division I Runner-Up
1991–92	Kansas	27–5	11–3	1st	NCAA Division I Round of 32
1992–93	Kansas	29–7	11–3	1st	NCAA Division I Final Four
1993–94	Kansas	27–8	9–5	3rd	NCAA Division I Sweet 16
1994–95	Kansas	25–6	11–3	1st	NCAA Division I Sweet 16
1995–96	Kansas	29–5	12–2	1st	NCAA Division I Elite Eight
Kansas Jayhawks (Big 12 Conference) (1996–2003)
1996–97	Kansas	34–2	15–1	1st	NCAA Division I Sweet 16
1997–98	Kansas	35–4	15–1	1st	NCAA Division I Round of 32
1998–99	Kansas	23–10	11–5	T–2nd	NCAA Division I Round of 32
1999–00	Kansas	24–10	11–5	5th	NCAA Division I Round of 32
2000–01	Kansas	26–7	12–4	T–2nd	NCAA Division I Sweet 16
2001–02	Kansas	33–4	16–0	1st	NCAA Division I Final Four
2002–03	Kansas	30–8	14–2	1st	NCAA Division I Runner-Up
Kansas:		418–101 (.805)	175–49 (.781)		
North Carolina Tar Heels (Atlantic Coast Conference) (2003–2021)
2003–04	North Carolina	19–11	8–8	6th	NCAA Division I Round of 32
2004–05	North Carolina	33–4	14–2	1st	NCAA Division I Champion
2005–06	North Carolina	23–8	12–4	2nd	NCAA Division I Round of 32
2006–07	North Carolina	31–7	11–5	T–1st	NCAA Division I Elite Eight
2007–08	North Carolina	36–3	14–2	1st	NCAA Division I Final Four
2008–09	North Carolina	34–4	13–3	1st	NCAA Division I Champion
2009–10	North Carolina	20–17	5–11	T–9th	NIT Runner-Up
2010–11	North Carolina	29–8	14–2	1st	NCAA Division I Elite Eight
2011–12	North Carolina	32–6	14–2	1st	NCAA Division I Elite Eight
2012–13	North Carolina	25–11	12–6	3rd	NCAA Division I Round of 32
2013–14	North Carolina	24–10	13–5	T–3rd	NCAA Division I Round of 32
2014–15	North Carolina	26–12	11–7	5th	NCAA Division I Sweet 16
2015–16	North Carolina	33–7	14–4	1st	NCAA Division I Runner-Up
2016–17	North Carolina	33–7	14–4	1st	NCAA Division I Champion
2017–18	North Carolina	26–11	11–7	T–3rd	NCAA Division I Round of 32
2018–19	North Carolina	29–7	16–2	T–1st	NCAA Division I Sweet 16
2019–20	North Carolina	14–19	6–14	T–13th	
2020–21	North Carolina	18–11	10–6	T–5th	NCAA Division I Round of 64
North Carolina:		485–163 (.748)	212–94 (.693)		
Total:		903–264 (.774)			
National champion Postseason invitational champion Conference regular season champion Conference regular season and conference tournament champion Division regular season champion Division regular season and conference tournament champion Conference tournament champion

== Coaching tree ==
Several former players and assistant coaches of Williams have gone on to their own careers in coaching.

- Jeff Boschee: Missouri Southern (2014–2022), Pittsburg State (2022–present)
- Hubert Davis: UNC Chapel Hill (2021–2026)
- Matt Doherty: Notre Dame (1999–2000), UNC Chapel Hill (2000–2003), Florida Atlantic (2005–2006), SMU (2006–2012)
- Neil Dougherty: TCU (2002–2008)
- Blake Flickner: Dallas Baptist (2006–present)
- Jerry Green: Oregon (1992–1997), Tennessee (1997–2001)
- Jerod Haase: UAB (2012–2016), Stanford (2016–2024)*, UNC Greensboro (2026-present)
- C.B. McGrath: UNC Wilmington (2017–2020)*
- Ben Miller: UNC Pembroke (2008–2019)
- Wes Miller: UNC Greensboro (2011–2021), Cincinnati (2021–2026), UNC Charlotte (2026-present)
- Steve Robinson: Tulsa (1995–1997), Florida State (1997–2002)
- Kevin Stallings: Illinois State (1993-1999), Vanderbilt (1999–2016), Pittsburgh (2016–2018)
- Mark Turgeon: Jacksonville State (1998–2000), Wichita State (2000–2007), Texas A&M (2007–2011), Maryland (2011–2021), Kansas City (2026-present)
- Jacque Vaughn: Orlando Magic (2012–2015), Brooklyn Nets (2016–2024)
- Rex Walters: Florida Atlantic (2006–2008), San Francisco (2008–2016)

(*) indicates a former player who also served as an assistant coach to Williams.

== Recognition ==
On December 8, 2021, the North Carolina Board of Transportation approved naming Interstate 40 between North Carolina Highway 86 and U.S. 15-501 "Roy Williams Highway".

== See also ==
- List of college men's basketball career coaching wins leaders
- List of NCAA Division I Men's Final Four appearances by coach
