= C. B. McGrath =

American basketball player and coach

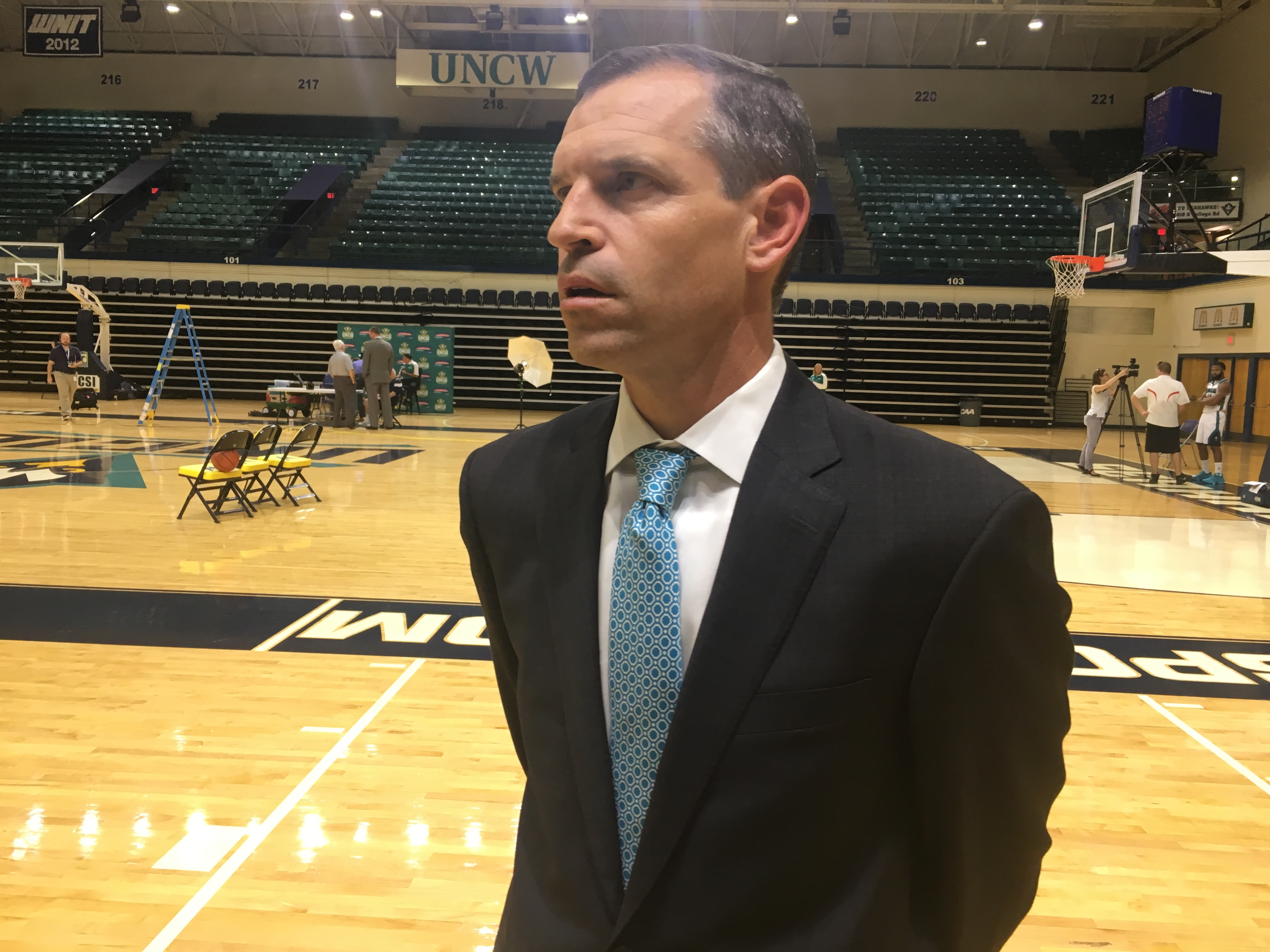
- McGrath in 2017

Biographical details
- Born: November 21, 1975 (age 50); Indianapolis, Indiana, U.S.

Playing career
- 1994–1998: Kansas

Coaching career (HC unless noted)
- 1999–2003: Kansas (admin. asst)
- 2003–2017: North Carolina (assistant)
- 2017–2020: UNC Wilmington
- 2021–2022: Cincinnati (special asst.)

Head coaching record
- Overall: 26–58 (.310)

Colin Bryan McGrath (born November 21, 1975) is an American college basketball coach, most recently the head coach at UNC Wilmington from 2017-2020. McGrath previously served under Roy Williams as an assistant coach with the University of North Carolina. Born in Indianapolis, Indiana, but raised in Topeka, Kansas, McGrath started out as a player for Williams at Kansas and was an assistant under him at Kansas and North Carolina.

On April 3, 2017 McGrath was named head coach at UNC Wilmington following the conclusion of North Carolina's season.

On January 13, 2020 UNCW relieved McGrath of his duties following a 5-14 start to the 2019-2020 season with just two of those wins coming against Division 1 competition.

C.B. McGrath joined the University of Cincinnati Men's Basketball staff in June 2021 as the Special Assistant to the Head Coach, where he still coaches today.

== Head coaching record ==
Record table
Season	Team	Overall	Conference	Standing	Postseason
UNC Wilmington Seahawks (Colonial Athletic Association) (2017–2020)
2017–18	UNC Wilmington	11–21	7–11	6th	
2018–19	UNC Wilmington	10–23	5–13	10th	
2019–20	UNC Wilmington	5–14	0–6		
UNC Wilmington:		26–58 (.310)	12–30 (.286)		
Total:		26–58 (.310)			
