= 1991–92 Nebraska Cornhuskers men's basketball team =

American college basketball season

1991–92 Nebraska Cornhuskers men's basketball

NCAA tournament
- Conference: Big Eight Conference
- Record: 19–10 (7–7 Big Eight)
- Head coach: Danny Nee (6th season)
- Assistant coaches: Gary Bargen; Lynn Mitchem; Jeff Smith
- Home arena: Bob Devaney Sports Center

1991–92 Big Eight Conference men's basketball standings
	Conf.				Overall
Team	W		L	PCT	W		L	PCT
No. 2 Kansas †	11	–	3	.786	27	–	5	.844
No. 11 Oklahoma State	8	–	6	.571	28	–	8	.778
No. 16 Missouri	8	–	6	.571	21	–	9	.700
No. 23 Oklahoma	8	–	6	.571	21	–	9	.700
Nebraska	7	–	7	.500	19	–	10	.655
Iowa State	5	–	9	.357	21	–	13	.618
Kansas State	5	–	9	.357	16	–	14	.533
Colorado	4	–	10	.286	13	–	15	.464
† 1992 Big Eight tournament winner As of April 6, 1992; Rankings from AP poll

The 1991–92 Nebraska Cornhuskers men's basketball team represented the University of Nebraska–Lincoln during the 1991–92 college basketball season. Led by head coach Danny Nee (6th season), the Cornhuskers competed in the Big Eight Conference and played their home games at the Bob Devaney Sports Center. They finished with a record of 19–10 overall and 7–7 in Big Eight Conference play. Nebraska earned an at-large bid to the 1992 NCAA tournament as the #8 seed in the Southeast region.

== Roster ==
1991–92 Nebraska Cornhuskers men's basketball team
Players
Coaches

Pos.	#	Name	Height	Weight	Year	Previous school	Hometown
F	00	Dapreis Owens	6 ft 8 in (2.03 m)	230 lb (104 kg)	Sr	Mansfield	Mansfield, OH
G	12	Jamar Johnson	6 ft 0 in (1.83 m)	180 lb (82 kg)	Jr	Concord	Elkhart, IN
G	14	J.F. Hoffman	6 ft 1 in (1.85 m)	190 lb (86 kg)	Sr	Cambridge	Holbrook, NE
F	21	Carl Hayes	6 ft 8 in (2.03 m)	195 lb (88 kg)	Sr	St. Joseph	Chicago, IL
G	23	Michael Hughes	6 ft 7 in (2.01 m)	190 lb (86 kg)	Jr	Peoria	Peoria, IL
G	24	Chris Cresswell	6 ft 4 in (1.93 m)	195 lb (88 kg)	Sr	Merced	Merced, CA
G	30	Jason Glock	6 ft 4 in (1.93 m)	195 lb (88 kg)	Fr	Wahoo	Wahoo, NE
C	34	Derrick Chandler	6 ft 10 in (2.08 m)	225 lb (102 kg)	Jr	Dematha	Mitchellville, MD
F	41	Bruce Chubick	6 ft 7 in (2.01 m)	215 lb (98 kg)	So	West Holt	Atkinson, NE
G	52	Eric Piatkowski	6 ft 6 in (1.98 m)	200 lb (91 kg)	So	Stevens	Rapid City, SD

Head coach

Danny Nee

Assistant coach(es)

- Gary Bargen
- Lynn Mitchem
- Jeff Smith

Legend

- (C) Team captain
- (S) Suspended
- (I) Ineligible
- (W) Walk-on
- Injured
- Current redshirt

== Schedule and results ==
Date time, TV	Rank^{#}	Opponent^{#}	Result	Record	Site city, state
Regular Season
Nov 23, 1991*		Sam Houston State	W 91–42	1–0	Bob Devaney Sports Center; Lincoln, Nebraska
Nov 25, 1991*		USC	W 93–84	2–0	Bob Devaney Sports Center; Lincoln, Nebraska
November 30, 1991*		at Southern Utah	W 106–101	3–0	Centrum Center; Cedar City, Utah
December 2, 1991*		The Citadel	W 84-61	4–0	Bob Devaney Sports Center; Lincoln, Nebraska
December 4, 1991*		at No. 22 Michigan State	L 78-101	4–1	Breslin Student Events Center; East Lansing, Michigan
Dec 7, 1991*		at Creighton; Rivalry	W 90–85	5–1	Omaha Civic Auditorium; Omaha, Nebraska
Dec 11, 1991*		Wisconsin	W 86–67	6–1	Bob Devaney Sports Center; Lincoln, Nebraska
Dec 20, 1991*		Texas A&M; Ameritas Classic	W 91–68	7–1	Bob Devaney Sports Center; Lincoln, Nebraska
Dec 21, 1991*		Eastern Washington; Ameritas Classic	W 102-67	8–1	Bob Devaney Sports Center; Lincoln, Nebraska
Dec 30, 1991*		UW-Green Bay	W 76-68	9–1	Bob Devaney Sports Center; Lincoln, Nebraska
Jan 2 30, 1992*		at Toledo	W 57-52	10–1	Savage Arena; Toledo, Ohio
Jan 4, 1992*		Eastern Illinois	W 81-68	11–1	Bob Devaney Sports Center; Lincoln, Nebraska
Jan 11, 1992		at Colorado	W 84–74	12–1 (1–0)	CU Events/Conference Center; Boulder, Colorado
Jan 18, 1992*		No. 13 Missouri	L 73-83	12–2 (1-1)	Bob Devaney Sports Center; Lincoln, NE
Jan 20, 1992*		University of Missouri-Kansas City	W 74-71	13–2	Bob Devaney Sports Center; Lincoln, NE
Jan 25, 1992		at No. 5 Kansas	L 78-103	13–3 (1-2)	Allen Fieldhouse; Lawrence, KS
Jan 28, 1992*		No. 18 Oklahoma	L 76-79	13–4 (1-3)	Bob Devaney Sports Center; Lincoln, NE
Feb 1, 1992*		Iowa State	W 68-63	14-4 (2-3)	Bob Devaney Sports Center; Lincoln, NE
Feb 5, 1992		No. 2 Oklahoma State	W 85–69	15–4 (3–3)	Bob Devaney Sports Center; Lincoln, Nebraska
Feb 8, 1992*		Kansas State	L 66-70	15-5 (3-4)	Bramlage Coliseum; Manhattan, KS
Feb 17, 1992*		No. 9 Missouri	L 61-87	15-6 (3-5)	Hearnes Center; Columbia, MO
Feb 19, 1992		No. 3 Kansas	W 81–79 ^{OT}	16–6 (4–5)	Bob Devaney Sports Center; Lincoln, Nebraska
Feb 22, 1992		at No. 23 Iowa State	W 80–70	17–6 (5–5)	Hilton Coliseum; Ames, Iowa
Feb 25, 1992	No. 25	at No. 14 Oklahoma State	L 51–72	17–7 (5–6)	Gallagher-Iba Arena; Stillwater, Oklahoma
Feb 29, 1992	No. 25	Colorado	W 84-70	18–7 (6–6)	Bob Devaney Sports Center; Lincoln, Nebraska
Mar 4, 1992		Kansas State	W 91–62	19–7 (7–6)	Bob Devaney Sports Center; Lincoln, Nebraska
Mar 7, 1992		at Oklahoma	L 97–106	19–8 (7–7)	Lloyd Noble Center; Norman, Oklahoma
Big Eight Tournament
Mar 13, 1992*		vs. No. 24 Oklahoma; Big Eight Tournament Quarterfinal	L 85–107	19–9	Kemper Arena; Kansas City, Missouri
NCAA Tournament
Mar 19, 1992*; CBS	(8 SE)	vs. (9 SE) Connecticut; First Round	L 65–86	19–10	Riverfront Coliseum (10,002); Cincinnati, Ohio
*Non-conference game. ^{#}Rankings from AP Poll. (#) Tournament seedings in parentheses. MW=Midwest. All times are in Central Time.
