= 1991–92 Oklahoma Sooners men's basketball team =

American college basketball season

1991–92 Oklahoma Sooners men's basketball

NCAA men's Division I tournament
- Conference: Big Eight Conference

Ranking
- Coaches: No. 24
- AP: No. 23
- Record: 21–9 (8–6 Big Eight)
- Head coach: Billy Tubbs (12th season)
- Home arena: Lloyd Noble Center (Capacity: 10,871)

1991–92 Big Eight Conference men's basketball standings
	Conf.				Overall
Team	W		L	PCT	W		L	PCT
No. 2 Kansas †	11	–	3	.786	27	–	5	.844
No. 11 Oklahoma State	8	–	6	.571	28	–	8	.778
No. 16 Missouri	8	–	6	.571	21	–	9	.700
No. 23 Oklahoma	8	–	6	.571	21	–	9	.700
Nebraska	7	–	7	.500	19	–	10	.655
Iowa State	5	–	9	.357	21	–	13	.618
Kansas State	5	–	9	.357	16	–	14	.533
Colorado	4	–	10	.286	13	–	15	.464
† 1992 Big Eight tournament winner As of April 6, 1992; Rankings from AP poll

The 1991–92 Oklahoma Sooners men's basketball team represented the University of Oklahoma in competitive college basketball during the 1991–92 NCAA Division I men's basketball season. The Oklahoma Sooners men's basketball team played its home games in the Lloyd Noble Center and was a member of the National Collegiate Athletic Association's (NCAA) former Big Eight Conference at that time.

The team posted a 21–9 overall record and a 8–6 conference record. The Sooners received a bid to the 1992 NCAA tournament, but fell in the opening round.

== Roster ==
1991–92 Oklahoma Sooners men's basketball team
Players
Coaches

Pos.	#	Name	Height	Weight	Year	Previous school	Hometown
G	20	Brent Price	6 ft 1 in (1.85 m)	165 lb (75 kg)	Sr	South Carolina	Enid, Oklahoma
F	32	Jeff Webster	6 ft 8 in (2.03 m)	220 lb (100 kg)	RS So	Carl Albert HS	Midwest City, Oklahoma

Head coach

- Billy Tubbs

Assistant coach(es)

Legend

- (C) Team captain
- (S) Suspended
- (I) Ineligible
- (W) Walk-on
- Injured
- Current redshirt

Roster

== Schedule and results ==
Date time, TV	Rank^{#}	Opponent^{#}	Result	Record	Site (attendance) city, state
Non-conference regular season
Nov 23, 1991		West Texas A&M	W 95–79	1–0	Lloyd Noble Center; Norman, Oklahoma
Nov 26, 1991*		at South Carolina	W 61–60	2–0	Carolina Coliseum; Columbia, South Carolina
Nov 30, 1991		Missouri-St. Louis	W 119–78	3–0	Lloyd Noble Center; Norman, Oklahoma
Dec 7, 1991*		Coppin State	W 97–70	4–0	Lloyd Noble Center; Norman, Oklahoma
Dec 10, 1991*		Texas	W 106–91	5–0	Lloyd Noble Center; Norman, Oklahoma
Dec 21, 1991*		Morgan State	W 144–81	6–0	Lloyd Noble Center; Norman, Oklahoma
Dec 27, 1991*		vs. Morehead State; All-College Tournament	W 118–99	7–0	Myriad Convention Center; Oklahoma City, Oklahoma
Dec 28, 1991*		vs. TCU; All-College Tournament	W 78–73	8–0	Myriad Convention Center; Oklahoma City, Oklahoma
Dec 30, 1991*	No. 14	vs. Mississippi Valley State	W 117–95	9–0	Montagne Center; Beaumont, Texas
Dec 31, 1991*	No. 14	at Lamar	W 101–91	10–0	Montagne Center; Beaumont, Texas
Jan 4, 1992*	No. 14	vs. UMass	L 73–86	10–1	Springfield Civic Center; Springfield, Massachusetts
Big 8 Regular Season
Jan 11, 1992	No. 21	at Iowa State	L 71–73	10–2 (0–1)	Hilton Coliseum; Ames, Iowa
Jan 18, 1992	No. 23	at Kansas State	W 117–76	11–2 (1–1)	Bramlage Coliseum; Manhattan, Kansas
Jan 20, 1992*	No. 17	No. 3 Oklahoma State; Bedlam Series	L 89–92	11–3 (1–2)	Lloyd Noble Center; Norman, Oklahoma
Jan 23, 1992*	No. 17	Oral Roberts	W 130–89	12–3	Lloyd Noble Center; Norman, Oklahoma
Jan 27, 1992	No. 18	at Nebraska	W 79–76	13–3 (2–2)	Bob Devaney Sports Center; Lincoln, Nebraska
Jan 29, 1992*	No. 18	Texas Southern	W 110–85	14–3	Lloyd Noble Center; Norman, Oklahoma
Feb 1, 1992	No. 18	No. 5 Kansas	L 95–96	14–4 (2–3)	Lloyd Noble Center; Norman, Oklahoma
Feb 5, 1992	No. 21	at Colorado	L 68–70 ^{OT}	14–5 (2–4)	CU Events Center; Boulder, Colorado
Feb 9, 1992	No. 21	No. 12 Missouri	L 92–99	14–6 (2–5)	Lloyd Noble Center; Norman, Oklahoma
Feb 15, 1992		Kansas State	W 104–75	15–6 (3–5)	Lloyd Noble Center; Norman, Oklahoma
Feb 19, 1992		at No. 8 Oklahoma State	W 70–67	16–6 (4–5)	Gallagher-Iba Arena; Stillwater, Oklahoma
Feb 22, 1992		Colorado	W 99–83	17–6 (5–5)	Lloyd Noble Center; Norman, Oklahoma
Feb 24, 1992		at No. 3 Kansas	L 65–84	17–7 (5–6)	Allen Fieldhouse; Lawrence, Kansas
Feb 29, 1992		Iowa State	W 96–70	18–7 (6–6)	Lloyd Noble Center; Norman, Oklahoma
Mar 4, 1992		at No. 11 Missouri	W 81–67	19–7 (7–6)	Hearnes Center; Columbia, Missouri
Mar 7, 1992		Nebraska	W 106–97	20–7 (8–6)	Lloyd Noble Center; Norman, Oklahoma
Big 8 Tournament
Mar 13, 1992*	No. 22	vs. Nebraska; Quarterfinals	W 107–85	21–7	Kemper Arena; Kansas City, Missouri
Mar 14, 1992*	No. 22	vs. No. 3 Kansas; Semifinals	L 67–85	21–8	Kemper Arena; Kansas City, Missouri
NCAA Tournament
Mar 20, 1992*	(4 W)	vs. (13 W) Southwestern Louisiana; First Round	L 83–87	21–9	ASU Activity Center; Tempe, Arizona
*Non-conference game. ^{#}Rankings from AP Poll. (#) Tournament seedings in parentheses. All times are in Central Time. (#) during NCAA Tournament is seed within region W=West.

== Team players in the 1992 NBA draft ==
Round	Pick	Player	Position	NBA club
2	32	Brent Price	Guard	Washington Bullets
