= 1991–92 Campbell Fighting Camels basketball team =

American college basketball season

1991–92 Campbell Fighting Camels basketball
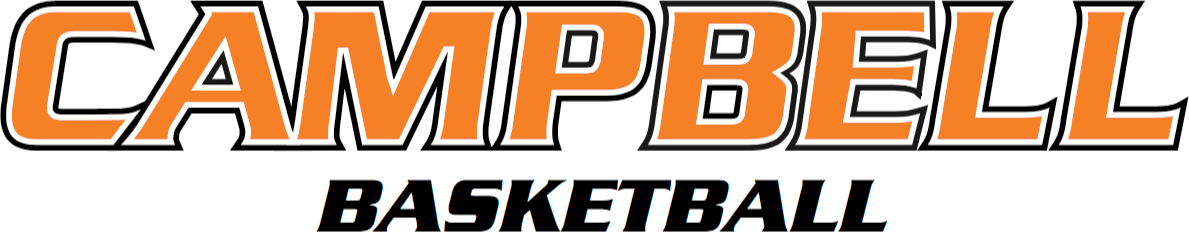

Big South tournament champions

NCAA tournament, first round
- Conference: Big South Conference
- Record: 19–12 (7–7 Big South)
- Head coach: Billy Lee (7th season)
- Home arena: Carter Gymnasium

1991–92 Big South Conference men's basketball standings
	Conf.				Overall
Team	W		L	PCT	W		L	PCT
Radford	12	–	2	.857	20	–	9	.690
Liberty	10	–	4	.714	22	–	7	.759
Campbell †	7	–	7	.500	19	–	12	.613
Charleston Southern	7	–	7	.500	16	–	14	.533
Coastal Carolina	6	–	8	.429	12	–	19	.387
Davidson	6	–	8	.429	11	–	17	.393
UNC Asheville	6	–	8	.429	9	–	19	.321
Winthrop	2	–	12	.143	6	–	22	.214
† 1992 Big South tournament winner Rankings from AP Poll

The 1991–92 Campbell Fighting Camels basketball team represented Campbell University during the 1991–92 NCAA Division I men's basketball season. The Fighting Camels, led by seventh-year head coach Billy Lee, played their home games at Carter Gymnasium in Buies Creek, North Carolina as members of the Big South Conference. The team finished in third place in the conference regular season standings, and would go on to win the Big South tournament to earn an automatic bid to the NCAA tournament. As No. 16 seed in the East region, the Fighting Camels lost in the opening round to defending champion (and eventual repeat champion) Duke, 82–56. Campbell finished with a record of 19–12 (7–7 Big South).

To date, this season marks the school's only appearance in the NCAA Tournament.

== Roster ==
1991–92 Campbell Fighting Camels men's basketball team
Players	Coaches
Pos. / # / Name / Height / Weight / Year / Previous school / Hometown; F / / Mark Mocnik / 6 ft 5 in (1.96 m) / — / Jr	Head coach: Billy Lee; Assistant coach(es) Legend: (C) Team captain; (S) Suspended; (I) Ineligible; (W) Walk-on; Injured; Current redshirt; Roster; Last update: March 21, 2021

== Schedule and results ==
Date time, TV	Rank^{#}	Opponent^{#}	Result	Record	Site (attendance) city, state
Non-conference regular season
Big South Conference regular season
Big South tournament
Mar 5, 1992*	(3)	vs. (6) Davidson; Quarterfinals	W 69–60	17–11	Civic Center of Anderson; Anderson, South Carolina
Mar 6, 1992*	(3)	vs. (2) Liberty; Semifinals	W 53–51	18–11	Civic Center of Anderson; Anderson, South Carolina
Mar 7, 1992*	(3)	vs. (4) Charleston Southern; Championship Game	W 67–53	19–11	Civic Center of Anderson; Anderson, South Carolina
NCAA tournament
Mar 19, 1992*	(16 E)	vs. (1 E) No. 1 Duke; First Round	L 56–82	19–12	Greensboro Coliseum (15,800); Greensboro, North Carolina
*Non-conference game. ^{#}Rankings from AP Poll. (#) Tournament seedings in parentheses. E=East. All times are in Eastern.
