= 1991–92 Missouri Tigers men's basketball team =

American college basketball season

1991–92 Missouri Tigers men's basketball

NCAA tournament, second round
- Conference: Big Eight Conference

Ranking
- Coaches: No. 13
- AP: No. 16
- Record: 21–9 (8–6 Big 8)
- Head coach: Norm Stewart (25th season)
- Home arena: Hearnes Center

1991–92 Big Eight Conference men's basketball standings
	Conf.				Overall
Team	W		L	PCT	W		L	PCT
No. 2 Kansas †	11	–	3	.786	27	–	5	.844
No. 11 Oklahoma State	8	–	6	.571	28	–	8	.778
No. 16 Missouri	8	–	6	.571	21	–	9	.700
No. 23 Oklahoma	8	–	6	.571	21	–	9	.700
Nebraska	7	–	7	.500	19	–	10	.655
Iowa State	5	–	9	.357	21	–	13	.618
Kansas State	5	–	9	.357	16	–	14	.533
Colorado	4	–	10	.286	13	–	15	.464
† 1992 Big Eight tournament winner As of April 6, 1992; Rankings from AP poll

The 1991–92 Missouri Tigers men's basketball team represented the University of Missouri as a member of the Big Eight Conference during the 1991–92 NCAA men's basketball season. Led by head coach Norm Stewart, the Tigers finished third in the Big Eight Conference, lost in the quarterfinal round of the Big Eight tournament, and received a bid to the NCAA tournament as the No. 5 seed in the East region. After defeating West Virginia in the opening round, Missouri fell to Seton Hall in the second round. The Tigers finished with an overall record of 21–9 (8–6 Big Eight).

== Roster ==
1991–92 Missouri Tigers men's basketball team
Players
Coaches

Pos.	#	Name	Height	Weight	Year	Hometown
F	0	Jevon Crudup	6 ft 9 in (2.06 m)	215 lb (98 kg)	So	Kansas City, Missouri
PG	15	Melvin Booker	6 ft 2 in (1.88 m)	185 lb (84 kg)	So	Moss Point, Mississippi
G	44	Anthony Peeler	6 ft 4 in (1.93 m)	205 lb (93 kg)	Jr	Kansas City, Missouri

Head coach

- Norm Stewart (Missouri)

Assistant coach(es)

Legend

- (C) Team captain
- (S) Suspended
- (I) Ineligible
- (W) Walk-on
- Injured
- Current redshirt

== Schedule and results ==
Date time, TV	Rank^{#}	Opponent^{#}	Result	Record	Site (attendance) city, state
Regular season
Nov 25, 1991*		Canisius	W 72–42	1–0	Hearnes Center; Columbia, Missouri
Nov 30, 1991*		Texas A&M	W 77–47	2–0	Hearnes Center; Columbia, Missouri
Dec 3, 1991*		Florida A&M	W 86–61	3–0	Hearnes Center; Columbia, Missouri
Dec 7, 1991*		at No. 11 Arkansas	W 87–76	4–0	Barnhill Arena; Fayetteville, Arkansas
Dec 14, 1991*; 7:30 p.m.	No. 21	UNLV	W 90–78	5–0	Hearnes Center (13,300); Columbia, Missouri
Dec 21, 1991*	No. 21	Jackson State	W 99–76	6–0	Hearnes Center; Columbia, Missouri
Dec 23, 1991*	No. 17	vs. Illinois; Braggin' Rights	W 61–44	7–0	St. Louis Arena; St. Louis, Missouri
Dec 28, 1991*	No. 16	Murray State	W 92–52	8–0	Hearnes Center; Columbia, Missouri
Dec 30, 1991*	No. 16	Eastern Illinois	W 83–56	9–0	Hearnes Center; Columbia, Missouri
Jan 4, 1992*	No. 13	at Oregon	W 79–58	10–0	McArthur Court; Eugene, Oregon
Jan 8, 1992*	No. 12	at Memphis State	L 78–89	11–1	The Pyramid; Memphis, Tennessee
Feb 2, 1992	No. 8	at No. 3 Oklahoma State	L 61–84	14–3 (2–2)	Gallagher-Iba Arena; Stillwater, Oklahoma
Feb 23, 1992	No. 9	No. 8 Oklahoma State	W 66–52	19–4 (7–3)	Hearnes Center; Columbia, Missouri
Feb 26, 1992	No. 6	at Iowa State	W 75–71	20–4 (8–3)	Hilton Coliseum; Ames, Iowa
Mar 1, 1992	No. 6	at Kansas State	L 69–73	20–5 (8–4)	Bramlage Coliseum; Manhattan, Kansas
Mar 4, 1992	No. 11	Oklahoma	L 67–81	20–6 (8–5)	Hearnes Center; Columbia, Missouri
Mar 8, 1992	No. 11	at No. 3 Kansas	L 89–97	20–7 (8–6)	Allen Fieldhouse; Lawrence, Kansas
Big Eight Conference tournament
Mar 13, 1992*	No. 13	vs. Iowa State; Quarterfinals	L 75–80	20–8	Kemper Arena; Kansas City, Missouri
NCAA tournament
Mar 19, 1992*	(5 E) No. 16	vs. (12 E) West Virginia; First Round	W 89–78	21–8	Greensboro Coliseum; Greensboro, North Carolina
Mar 21, 1992*	(5 E) No. 16	vs. (4 E) No. 19 Seton Hall; Second Round	L 71–88	21–9	Greensboro Coliseum; Greensboro, North Carolina
*Non-conference game. ^{#}Rankings from AP. (#) Tournament seedings in parentheses. E=East. All times are in Central.

== Team players in the 1992 NBA draft ==
Round	Pick	Player	NBA club
1	15	Anthony Peeler	Los Angeles Lakers
