= 1991–92 Kansas Jayhawks men's basketball team =

American college basketball season

1991–92 Kansas Jayhawks men's basketball

Big Eight Regular Season Champions Big Eight tournament champions

NCAA men's Division I tournament, Round of 32
- Conference: Big Eight Conference

Ranking
- Coaches: No. 2
- AP: No. 2
- Record: 27–5 (11–3 Big Eight)
- Head coach: Roy Williams (4th season)
- Assistant coaches: Jerry Green (4th season); Steve Robinson (4th season); Kevin Stallings (4th season); Mark Turgeon (5th season)
- Captains: Lane Czaplinski; Alonzo Jamison; David Johanning; Macolm Nash
- Home arena: Allen Fieldhouse

1991–92 Big Eight Conference men's basketball standings
	Conf.				Overall
Team	W		L	PCT	W		L	PCT
No. 2 Kansas †	11	–	3	.786	27	–	5	.844
No. 11 Oklahoma State	8	–	6	.571	28	–	8	.778
No. 16 Missouri	8	–	6	.571	21	–	9	.700
No. 23 Oklahoma	8	–	6	.571	21	–	9	.700
Nebraska	7	–	7	.500	19	–	10	.655
Iowa State	5	–	9	.357	21	–	13	.618
Kansas State	5	–	9	.357	16	–	14	.533
Colorado	4	–	10	.286	13	–	15	.464
† 1992 Big Eight tournament winner As of April 6, 1992; Rankings from AP poll

The 1991–92 Kansas Jayhawks men's basketball team represented the University of Kansas in the 1991–92 NCAA Division I men's basketball season, which was the Jayhawks' 94th basketball season. The head coach was Roy Williams, who served his 4th year at KU. The team played its home games in Allen Fieldhouse in Lawrence, Kansas.

== Roster ==
Name	#	Position	Height	Weight	Year	Home Town
Lane Czaplinski	11	Guard	5-11	180	Senior	Kansas City, Missouri
Ben Davis	31	Forward	6-8	235	Freshman	Mouth of Wilson, Virginia
Greg Gurley	33	Guard	6-5	185	Freshman	Leawood, Kansas
Alonzo Jamison	24	Forward	6-6	225	Senior	Santa Ana, California
David Johanning	54	Center	6-10	220	Senior	Wichita, Kansas
Adonis Jordan	30	Guard	5-11	170	Junior	Reseda, California
Macolm Nash	43	Forward	6-7	210	Senior	St. Louis, Missouri
Greg Ostertag	00	Center	7-2	270	Freshman	Duncanville, Texas
Eric Pauley	51	Center	6-10	210	Junior	Buena Park, California
Patrick Richey	12	Guard/Forward	6-8	190	Sophomore	Lee's Summit, Missouri
Richard Scott	34	Forward	6-7	215	Sophomore	Little Rock, Arkansas
Rex Walters	23	Guard	6–4	190	Junior	San Jose, California
Steve Woodberry	20	Guard/Forward	6–4	180	Sophomore	Wichita, Kansas

== Big Eight Conference standings ==
#	Team	Conference	Pct.	Overall	Pct.
1	Kansas	11-3	.786	27-5	.844
2	Oklahoma State	8-6	.571	28-8	.778
3	Missouri	8-6	.571	21-9	.700
4	Oklahoma	8-6	.571	21-9	.700
5	Nebraska	7-7	.500	19-10	.655
6	Iowa State	5-9	.357	21-13	.618
7	Kansas State	5-9	.357	16-14	.533
8	Colorado	4-10	.286	13-15	.464

== Schedule ==
Date time, TV	Rank^{#}	Opponent^{#}	Result	Record	Site city, state
11/23/1991*	No. 12	UMBC	W 122-58	1–0	Allen Fieldhouse; Lawrence, KS
11/26/1991*	No. 12	Arkansas-Little Rock	W 91-80	2–0	Allen Fieldhouse; Lawrence, KS
11/30/1991*	No. 12	Central Missouri	W 83-54	3–0	Allen Fieldhouse; Lawrence, KS
12/7/1991*	No. 10	at Long Beach State	W 66-60	4–0	Long Beach Arena; Long Beach, CA
12/14/1991*	No. 7	DePaul	W 104-75	5-0	Allen Fieldhouse; Lawrence, KS
12/21/1991*	No. 6	Seattle Pacific	W 97-62	6-0	Allen Fieldhouse; Lawrence, KS
12/27/1991*	No. 4	vs. Southern Miss	W 109-76	7-0	Kemper Arena; Kansas City, MO
12/28/1991*	No. 4	vs. Temple	W 97-73	8-0	Kemper Arena; Kansas City, MO
1/2/1992*	No. 4	Pepperdine	W 79-73 ^{OT}	9-0	Allen Fieldhouse; Lawrence, KS
1/4/1992*	No. 4	at SMU	W 79-67	10-0	Moody Coliseum; University Park, TX
1/8/1992*	No. 4	at Wichita State	W 81-51	11-0	Levitt Arena; Wichita, KS
1/11/1992*	No. 4	Louisville	L 78-85	11-1	Allen Fieldhouse; Lawrence, KS
1/13/1992	No. 6	at No. 13 Missouri; Border War	W 92-80	12-1	Hearnes Center; Columbia, MO
1/18/1992	No. 6	at Colorado	W 81-80	13-1	Coors Events Center; Boulder, CO
1/25/1992	No. 5	Nebraska	W 103-78	14-1	Allen Fieldhouse; Lawrence, KS
1/28/1992*	No. 5	at Marquette	W 85-61	15-1	BMO Harris Bradley Center; Milwaukee, WI
2/1/1992	No. 5	at No. 18 Oklahoma	W 96-95	16-1	Lloyd Noble Center; Norman, OK
2/3/1992	No. 3	Kansas State; Sunflower Showdown	W 80-58	17-1	Allen Fieldhouse; Lawrence, KS
2/8/1992	No. 3	at No. 2 Oklahoma State	L 58-64	17-2	Gallagher-Iba Arena; Stillwater, OK
2/12/1992	No. 4	Iowa State	W 91-60	18-2	Allen Fieldhouse; Lawrence, KS
2/15/1992	No. 4	Colorado	W 82-45	19-2	Allen Fieldhouse; Lawrence, KS
2/19/1992	No. 3	at Nebraska	L 79-81 ^{OT}	19-3	Bob Devaney Sports Center; Lincoln, NE
2/22/1992	No. 3	at Kansas State; Sunflower Showdown	W 54-52	20-3	Bramlage Coliseum; Manhattan, KS
2/24/1992	No. 3	Oklahoma	W 84-65	21-3	Allen Fieldhouse; Lawrence, KS
3/2/1992	No. 3	No. 12 Oklahoma State	W 77-64	22-3	Allen Fieldhouse; Lawrence, KS
3/4/1992	No. 3	at Iowa State	L 66-70	22-4	Hilton Coliseum; Ames, IA
3/8/1992	No. 3	No. 11 Missouri; Border War	W 97-89	23-4	Allen Fieldhouse; Lawrence, KS
Big Eight tournament
3/13/1992	(1) No. 3	vs. (8) Colorado; Quarterfinals	W 84-66	24-4	Kemper Arena; Kansas City, MO
3/14/1992	(1) No. 3	vs. (4) No. 24 Oklahoma; Semifinals	W 85-67	25-4	Kemper Arena; Kansas City, MO
3/15/1992	(1) No. 3	vs. (2) No. 11 Oklahoma State; Championship Game	W 66-57	26-4	Kemper Arena; Kansas City, MO
NCAA tournament
3/20/1992*	(1 MW) No. 2	vs. (16 MW) Howard; First Round	W 100-67	27-4	University of Dayton Arena; Dayton, OH
3/22/1992*	(1 MW) No. 2	vs. (9 MW) UTEP; Second Round	L 60-66	27-5	University of Dayton Arena; Dayton, OH
*Non-conference game. ^{#}Rankings from AP Poll, NCAA tournament seeds shown in parentheses. (#) Tournament seedings in parentheses. MW=Midwest. All times are in Central Standard Time.

== Rankings ==
Poll	Pre	Wk 1	Wk 2	Wk 3	Wk 4	Wk 5	Wk 6	Wk 7	Wk 8	Wk 9	Wk 10	Wk 11	Wk 12	Wk 13	Wk 14	Wk 15	Wk 16	Wk 17
AP	12	12	10	7	6	4	4	4	6	5	5	3	4	3	3	3	3	2
Coaches																		

*There was no coaches poll in week 1.

== See also ==
- 1992 NCAA Division I men's basketball tournament
