= 1991–92 NCAA Division I men's basketball rankings =

- Season: 1991–92
- NCAA Tournament: 1992
- Preseason No. 1: Duke
- NCAA Tournament Champions: Duke
NCAA Division I men's basketball rankings
| |

The 1991–92 NCAA Division I men's basketball rankings was made up of two human polls, the AP Poll and the Coaches Poll, in addition to various other preseason polls.

== Legend ==
| | Increase in ranking |
| | Decrease in ranking |
| | New to rankings from previous week |
| Italics | Number of first place votes |
| (#–#) | Win–loss record |
| т | Tied with team above or below also with this symbol |

== AP Poll ==
| | Preseason | Week 2 Nov. 25 | Week 3 Dec. 2 | Week 4 Dec. 9 | Week 5 Dec. 16 | Week 6 Dec. 23 | Week 7 Dec. 30 | Week 8 Jan. 6 | Week 9 Jan. 13 | Week 10 Jan. 20 | Week 11 Jan. 27 | Week 12 Feb. 3 | Week 13 Feb. 10 | Week 14 Feb. 17 | Week 15 Feb. 24 | Week 16 Mar. 2 | Week 17 Mar. 9 | Final Final | |
|---|---|---|---|---|---|---|---|---|---|---|---|---|---|---|---|---|---|---|---|
| 1. | Duke | Duke (0–0) | Duke (2–0) | Duke (4–0) | Duke (5–0) | Duke (5–0) | Duke (5–0) | Duke (7–0) | Duke (10–0) | Duke (12–0) | Duke (14–0) | Duke (17–0) | Duke (18–1) | Duke (20–1) | Duke (21–2) | Duke (23–2) | Duke (25–2) | Duke (28–2) | 1. |
| 2. | Indiana | Arkansas (0–0) | UCLA (2–0) | Arizona (3–0) | Arizona (4–0) | UCLA (5–0) | UCLA (7–0) | UCLA (8–0) | UCLA (10–0) | UCLA (12–0) | UCLA (14–0) | Oklahoma State (20–0) | Oklahoma State (21–1) | UCLA (19–1) | Indiana (20–4) | Indiana (21–4) | Arizona (24–4) | Kansas (26–4) | 2. |
| 3. | Arkansas | Arizona (0–0) | Arizona (1–0) | UCLA (3–0) | UCLA (4–0) | Oklahoma State (10–0) | Oklahoma State (10–0) | Oklahoma State (12–0) | Oklahoma State (14–0) | Oklahoma State (16–0) | Oklahoma State (18–0) | Kansas (16–1) | UCLA (17–1) | Kansas (19–2) | Kansas (20–3) | Kansas (21–3) | Kansas (23–4) | Ohio State (23–5) | 3. |
| 4. | Kentucky | UCLA (1–0) | Ohio State (2–0) | Ohio State (4–0) | Ohio State (5–0) | Kansas (6–0) | Kansas (8–0) | Kansas (10–0) | Ohio State (10–1) | Indiana (13–2) | Indiana (14–2) | UCLA (15–1) | Indiana (17–3) т | North Carolina (18–3) | UCLA (21–2) | Arizona (22–4) | Indiana (22–5) | UCLA (25–4) | 4. |
| 5. | Arizona | Ohio State (0–0) | North Carolina (4–0) | North Carolina (6–0) | Oklahoma State (9–0) | Connecticut (5–0) | Connecticut (6–0) | Connecticut (10–0) | Indiana (11–2) | Kansas (13–1) | Kansas (14–1) | Arkansas (17–3) | Kansas (17–2) т | Arizona (19–3) | Arizona (20–4) | Ohio State (19–5) | Ohio State (21–5) | Indiana (23–6) | 5. |
| 6. | LSU | North Carolina (1–0) | Seton Hall (2–0) | Oklahoma State (7–0) | Kansas (5–0) | Arizona (5–1) | Arizona (6–1) | Arizona (9–1) | Kansas (11–1) | Ohio State (11–2) | Connecticut (15–1) | Indiana (15–3) | North Carolina (17–3) | Ohio State (17–3) | Missouri (19–4) | UNLV (25–2) | Arkansas (24–6) | Kentucky (26–6) | 6. |
| 7. | Ohio State | Seton Hall (1–0) | St. John's (3–0) | Kansas (4–0) | Connecticut (5–0) | Ohio State (6–1) | Ohio State (7–1) | Ohio State (8–1) | Arizona (10–2) | Connecticut (13–1) | Arkansas (17–3) | Arizona (15–3) | Arizona (17–3) | Indiana (18–4) | UNLV (24–2) | Arkansas (22–6) | UNLV (26–2) | UNLV (26–2) | 7. |
| 8. | North Carolina | St. John's (1–0) | Oklahoma State (5–0) | Connecticut (4–0) | Kentucky (6–1) | North Carolina (7–1) | North Carolina (7–1) | North Carolina (9–1) | Connecticut (11–1) | Kentucky (14–2) | Missouri (14–2) | Ohio State (14–3) | Ohio State (16–3) | Oklahoma State (21–3) | Ohio State (17–5) | USC (20–4) | UCLA (23–4) | USC (23–6) | 8. |
| 9. | Seton Hall | LSU (1–0) | Indiana (1–1) | Kentucky (3–1) | North Carolina (6–1) | Michigan State (8–0) | Michigan State (10–0) | Michigan State (10–0) | Alabama (14–1) | Arkansas (15–3) | Arizona (13–3) | North Carolina (15–3) | Missouri (16–3) | Missouri (17–3) | Arkansas (20–6) | UCLA (21–4) | Kentucky (23–6) | Arkansas (25–7) | 9. |
| 10. | St. John's | Indiana (0–1) | Kansas (3–0) | Utah (6–0) | St. John's (4–1) | Indiana (6–2) | Indiana (8–2) | Indiana (9–2) | Kentucky (12–2) | North Carolina (13–2) | Ohio State (12–3) | Connecticut (16–2) | Syracuse (16–3) | Arkansas (19–5) | North Carolina (18–5) | Kentucky (22–5) | USC (21–5) | Arizona (24–6) | 10. |
| 11. | UCLA | Oklahoma State (2–0) | Arkansas (2–1) | St. John's (3–1) | Seton Hall (5–1) | Michigan (6–1) | Michigan (7–1) | Michigan (8–1) | Michigan State (11–1) | Arizona (11–3) | North Carolina (14–3) | Michigan State (14–3) | Arkansas (17–5) | Michigan State (17–4) | Kentucky (20–5) | Missouri (20–5) | Oklahoma State (24–6) | Oklahoma State (26–7) | 11. |
| 12. | Kansas | Kansas (1–0) | Connecticut (2–0) | Seton Hall (3–1) | Michigan State (6–0) | Seton Hall (5–1) | Seton Hall (7–1) | Missouri (11–0) | Arkansas (13–3) | Missouri (12–2) | Syracuse (14–2) | Missouri (14–3) | Michigan State (15–4) | UNLV (22–2) | Michigan State (18–5) | Oklahoma State (22–5) | Cincinnati (23–4) | Cincinnati (25–4) | 12. |
| 13. | Oklahoma State | Kentucky (1–1) | Utah (3–0) | Indiana (2–2) т | Georgia Tech (6–1) | Georgia Tech (7–2) | Missouri (9–0) | Arkansas (12–2) | Missouri (11–1) | Syracuse (13–1) | Michigan State (13–2) | Syracuse (15–3) | USC (16–3) | Kentucky (18–5) | USC (19–4) | Michigan State (18–6) | Missouri (20–7) | Alabama (25–8) | 13. |
| 14. | Utah | Utah (1–0) | Kentucky (1–1) | Georgia Tech (5–1) т | Indiana (5–2) | Oklahoma (6–0) | Oklahoma (8–0) | Georgia Tech (11–2) | North Carolina (10–2) | Michigan State (12–2) | Kentucky (14–4) | Tulane (16–1) | Tulane (18–2) | Alabama (19–5) | Oklahoma State (21–5) | Cincinnati (22–4) | Michigan (18–8) | Michigan State (21–7) | 14. |
| 15. | Connecticut | Connecticut (1–0) | Alabama (4–0) | Michigan State (5–0) | Michigan (4–1) | Arkansas (7–2) | Georgia Tech (8–2) | Kentucky (10–2) | Michigan (9–2) | Alabama (14–3) | Michigan (11–4) | Michigan (12–5) | UNLV (22–2) | USC (17–4) | Tulane (19–3) | DePaul (19–6) | Seton Hall (20–7) | Michigan (20–8) | 15. |
| 16. | Georgetown | Alabama (1–0) | LSU (2–1) | Iowa (4–0) | Oklahoma (5–0) | Missouri (7–0) | Arkansas (9–2) | Alabama (12–1) | Georgia Tech (12–3) | Michigan (10–3) | Tulane (15–1) | USC (14–3) | Alabama (19–4) | Florida State (18–6) | Alabama (20–6) | North Carolina (18–7) | Michigan State (19–7) | Missouri (20–8) | 16. |
| 17. | Alabama | Georgetown (0–0) | Georgia Tech (3–1) | Oklahoma (4–0) | Missouri (6–0) | Kentucky (6–2) | Kentucky (8–2) | St. John's (8–2) | St. John's (9–3) | Oklahoma (11–2) | Charlotte (13–2) | UNLV (19–2) | Michigan (14–5) | Syracuse (16–5) | Michigan (17–6) | Georgetown (18–7) | Alabama (23–7) | UMass (28–4) | 17. |
| 18. | DePaul | Georgia Tech (2–0) | Georgetown (2–0) | Michigan (2–0) | Utah (8–1) | St. John's (4–2) | St. John's (6–2) | Seton Hall (8–2) | Charlotte (11–1) | Georgia Tech (13–4) | Oklahoma (12–3) | Alabama (17–4) | Connecticut (16–4) | Tulane (19–3) | Georgetown (17–6) | Michigan (17–7) | Florida State (19–8) | North Carolina (21–9) | 18. |
| 19. | Oklahoma | Oklahoma (1–0) | Oklahoma (3–0) | Arkansas (4–2) | Arkansas (5–2) | Utah (9–1) | Alabama (10–1) | Wake Forest (7–1) | Tulane (11–0) | Charlotte (11–2) | UTEP (16–1) | Kentucky (15–5) | Kentucky (16–5) | Cincinnati (19–3) | Cincinnati (20–4) | Florida State (19–8) | DePaul (20–7) | Seton Hall (21–8) | 19. |
| 20. | Michigan | DePaul (0–0) | DePaul (1–0) | Alabama (5–1) | Alabama (6–1) | Alabama (8–1) | Wake Forest (6–1) | Syracuse (10–0) | Syracuse (11–1) | Louisville (10–3) | Georgia Tech (14–5) | Charlotte (15–3) | LSU (14–5) | Michigan (15–6) | St. John's (16–7) | Alabama (21–7) | North Carolina (19–8) | Florida State (20–9) | 20. |
| 21. | Iowa | Iowa (1–0) | Iowa (2–0) | Missouri (4–0) | Wake Forest (4–1) | Louisville (6–0) | Charlotte (7–1) | Oklahoma (10–1) | Seton Hall (9–3) | Tulane (13–1) | UNLV (18–2) | Oklahoma (14–4) | UTEP (18–3) | Connecticut (16–5) | DePaul (18–6) | Tulane (19–5) | Georgetown (19–8) | Syracuse (21–9) | 21. |
| 22. | Wake Forest | Wake Forest (1–0) | Michigan State (3–0) | Wake Forest (4–1) | Iowa (6–1) | Wake Forest (6–1) | Georgetown (7–1) | Charlotte (8–1) | Georgetown (9–2) | St. John's (10–4) | Alabama (15–4) | LSU (12–4) | Charlotte (16–4) | Seton Hall (15–6) | Florida State (18–8) т | Seton Hall (18–7) | UMass (26–4) | Georgetown (21–9) | 22. |
| 23. | Georgia Tech | Michigan (0–0) | Wake Forest (3–0) | Georgetown (2–1) | Georgetown (4–1) | Iowa (6–1) | Syracuse (7–0) | USC (8–1) | Oklahoma (10–2) | UTEP (14–1) | Florida State (14–5) | Florida State (14–5) | Florida State (15–6) | Iowa State (18–8) | Syracuse (16–7) т | LSU (18–7) | LSU (19–8) | Oklahoma (21–8) | 23. |
| 24. | Arizona State | Pittsburgh (2–0) | UNLV (2–0) | Charlotte (4–1) | Charlotte (7–1) | Georgetown (6–1) | Louisville (6–1) | Tulane (9–0) | Iowa State (13–3) | Stanford (11–1) | Louisville (11–4) | Georgia Tech (15–6) | Cincinnati (17–3) | St. John's (14–7) | Connecticut (17–6) | Syracuse (18–7) | Oklahoma (20–7) | DePaul (20–8) | 24. |
| 25. | Louisville | Arizona State (0–0) | Michigan (0–0) | LSU (2–2) | Louisville (4–0) | Charlotte (7–1) | USC (8–1) | UMass (11–2) | Louisville (8–3) | UNLV (14–2) | USC (13–3) | UTEP (16–3) | Seton Hall (13–6) | Georgetown (17–6) | Nebraska (17–6) | UMass (24–4) | St. John's (19–8) | LSU (20–9) | 25. |
| | Preseason | Week 2 Nov. 25 | Week 3 Dec. 2 | Week 4 Dec. 9 | Week 5 Dec. 16 | Week 6 Dec. 23 | Week 7 Dec. 30 | Week 8 Jan. 6 | Week 9 Jan. 13 | Week 10 Jan. 20 | Week 11 Jan. 27 | Week 12 Feb. 3 | Week 13 Feb. 10 | Week 14 Feb. 17 | Week 15 Feb. 24 | Week 16 Mar. 2 | Week 17 Mar. 9 | Final Final | |
| | | Dropped: Louisville (1–0) | Dropped: Pittsburgh (3–1); Arizona State (1–1) | Dropped: DePaul (1–2); UNLV (3–1) | Dropped: LSU (2–2) | None | Dropped: Utah (9–2); Iowa (7–2) | Dropped: Georgetown (7–3); Louisville (7–3) | Dropped: Wake Forest (8–3); USC (9–2); UMass (12–3) | Dropped: Seton Hall (9–5); Georgetown (9–4); Iowa State (13–5) | Dropped: St. John's (10–6); Stanford (11–3) | Dropped: Louisville (11–6) | Dropped: Oklahoma (14–6); Georgia Tech (16–7) | Dropped: UTEP (18–5); Charlotte (17–5); LSU (14–7) | Dropped: Seton Hall (16–7); Iowa State (18–9) | Dropped: St. John's (17–8); Connecticut (17–8); Nebraska (18–7) | Dropped: Tulane (20–7); Syracuse (18–9) | Dropped: St. John's (19–10) | |

== Coaches Poll ==
| | Preseason | Week 2 Nov. 25 | Week 3 Dec. 2 | Week 4 Dec. 9 | Week 5 Dec. 16 | Week 6 Dec. 23 | Week 7 Dec. 30 | Week 8 Jan. 6 | Week 9 Jan. 13 | Week 10 Jan. 20 | Week 11 Jan. 27 | Week 12 Feb. 3 | Week 13 Feb. 10 | Week 14 Feb. 17 | Week 15 Feb. 24 | Week 16 Mar. 2 | Week 17 Mar. 9 | Final Final | |
|---|---|---|---|---|---|---|---|---|---|---|---|---|---|---|---|---|---|---|---|
| 1. | Duke | Duke (0–0) | Duke (2–0) | Duke (4–0) | Duke (5–0) | Duke (5–0) | Duke (5–0) | Duke (7–0) | Duke (10–0) | Duke (12–0) | Duke (14–0) | Duke (17–0) | Duke (18–1) | Duke (20–1) | Duke (21–2) | Duke (23–2) | Duke (25–2) | Duke (28–2) | 1. |
| 2. | Indiana | UCLA (1–0) | UCLA (2–0) | UCLA (3–0) | UCLA (4–0) | UCLA (5–0) | UCLA (7–0) | UCLA (8–0) | UCLA (10–0) | UCLA (12–0) | UCLA (14–0) | Oklahoma State (20–0) | Oklahoma State (21–1) | UCLA (19–1) | Kansas (20–3) | Indiana (21–4) | Kansas (23–4) | Kansas (26–4) | 2. |
| 3. | Arkansas | Arkansas (0–0) | Arizona (1–0) т | Ohio State (4–0) | Ohio State (5–0) | Oklahoma State (10–0) | Oklahoma State (10–0) | Oklahoma State (12–0) | Oklahoma State (14–0) | Oklahoma State (16–0) | Oklahoma State (18–0) | Kansas (16–1) | UCLA (17–1) | Kansas (19–2) | Indiana (20–4) | Kansas (21–3) | Arizona (24–4) | Ohio State (23–5) | 3. |
| 4. | North Carolina | Arizona (0–0) | Ohio State (2–0) т | Arizona (3–0) | Arizona (4–0) | Kansas (6–0) | Kansas (8–0) | Kansas (10–0) | Ohio State (10–1) | Indiana (13–2) | Indiana (14–2) | UCLA (15–1) | Ohio State (16–3) | Ohio State (17–3) | UCLA (21–2) | Arizona (22–4) | Indiana (22–5) | Indiana (23–6) | 4. |
| 5. | Ohio State | North Carolina (1–0) | North Carolina (4–0) | North Carolina (6–0) | Oklahoma State (9–0) | Connecticut (5–0) | Connecticut (6–0) | Connecticut (10–0) | Indiana (11–2) | Ohio State (11–2) | Kansas (14–1) | Arkansas (17–3) | Kansas (17–2) | Arizona (19–3) | Ohio State (17–5) | Ohio State (19–5) | Ohio State (21–5) | UCLA (25–4) | 5. |
| 6. | LSU | Ohio State (0–0) | Oklahoma State (5–0) | Oklahoma State (7–0) | North Carolina (6–1) | Arizona (5–1) | North Carolina (7–1) | Arizona (9–1) | Arizona (10–2) | Connecticut (13–1) | Connecticut (15–1) | Arizona (15–3) | Indiana (17–3) | North Carolina (18–3) | Arizona (20–4) | Arkansas (22–6) | Arkansas (24–6) | USC (23–6) | 6. |
| 7. | Arizona | Seton Hall (1–0) | Seton Hall (2–0) | Kansas (4–0) | Kansas (5–0) | North Carolina (7–1) | Ohio State (7–1) | Ohio State (8–1) | Kansas (11–1) | Kansas (13–1) | Arkansas (17–3) | Ohio State (14–3) | Arizona (17–3) | Indiana (18–4) | Missouri (19–4) | UCLA (21–4) | UCLA (23–4) | Arizona (24–6) | 7. |
| 8. | Kentucky | Oklahoma State (2–0) | St. John's (3–0) | Connecticut (4–0) | Connecticut (5–0) | Michigan State (8–0) | Arizona (6–1) | North Carolina (9–1) | Connecticut (11–1) | Kentucky (14–2) | Ohio State (12–3) | North Carolina (15–3) | North Carolina (17–3) | Oklahoma State (21–3) | Arkansas (20–6) | Missouri (20–5) | USC (21–5) | Arkansas (25–7) | 8. |
| 9. | Seton Hall | Indiana (0–1) | Kansas (3–0) | Kentucky (3–1) | Kentucky (6–1) | Ohio State (6–1) | Michigan State (10–0) | Indiana (9–2) | Alabama (14–1) | Arizona (11–3) | Arizona (13–3) | Indiana (15–3) | Arkansas (17–5) | Arkansas (19–5) | Oklahoma State (21–5) | Kentucky (22–5) | Missouri (20–7) | Kentucky (26–6) | 9. |
| 10. | St. John's | Kansas (1–0) | Indiana (1–1) | St. John's (3–1) | Indiana (5–2) | Indiana (6–2) | Indiana (8–2) | Michigan State (10–0) | Michigan State (11–1) | Arkansas (15–3) | Missouri (14–2) | Connecticut (16–2) | Syracuse (16–3) | Missouri (17–3) | North Carolina (18–5) | USC (20–4) | Oklahoma State (24–6) | Oklahoma State (26–7) | 10. |
| 11. | UCLA | St. John's (1–0) | Arkansas (2–1) | Utah (6–0) | St. John's (4–1) | Georgia Tech (7–2) | Michigan (7–1) | Kentucky (10–2) | Kentucky (12–2) | North Carolina (13–2) | North Carolina (14–3) | Michigan State (14–3) | Missouri (16–3) | Michigan State (17–4) | Michigan State (18–5) | Oklahoma State (22–5) | Kentucky (23–6) | Cincinnati (25–4) | 11. |
| 12. | Oklahoma State | LSU (1–0) | Connecticut (2–0) | Indiana (2–2) | Seton Hall (5–1) | Michigan (6–1) | Seton Hall (7–1) | Michigan (8–1) | Arkansas (13–3) | Missouri (12–2) | Syracuse (14–2) | Syracuse (15–3) | Michigan State (15–4) | Kentucky (18–5) | Kentucky (20–5) | Michigan State (18–6) | Cincinnati (23–4) | Alabama (25–8) | 12. |
| 13. | Kansas | Connecticut (1–0) | LSU (2–1) | Georgia Tech (5–1) | Georgia Tech (6–1) | Seton Hall (5–1) | Oklahoma (8–0) | Arkansas (12–2) | Missouri (11–1) т | Michigan State (12–2) | Michigan State (13–2) | Tulane (16–1) | Tulane (18–2) | Alabama (19–5) | USC (19–4) | North Carolina (18–7) | Florida State (19–8) | Missouri (20–8) | 13. |
| 14. | Georgetown | Alabama (1–0) | Georgetown (2–0) | Seton Hall (3–1) | Michigan State (6–0) | Arkansas (7–2) | Missouri (9–0) | Missouri (11–0) | North Carolina (10–2) т | Syracuse (13–1) | Kentucky (14–4) | Missouri (14–3) | Connecticut (16–4) | Syracuse (16–5) | Alabama (20–6) | Georgetown (18–7) | Alabama (23–7) | North Carolina (21–9) | 14. |
| 15. | Connecticut | Kentucky (1–1) | Alabama (4–0) | Michigan State (5–0) | Michigan (4–1) | Missouri (7–0) | Georgia Tech (8–2) | Georgia Tech (11–2) | Michigan (9–2) | Alabama (14–3) | Tulane (15–1) | Alabama (17–4) | Alabama (19–4) | Tulane (19–3) | Tulane (19–3) | Cincinnati (22–4) | Michigan (18–8) | Michigan State (21–7) | 15. |
| 16. | Alabama | Georgetown (0–0) | Georgia Tech (3–1) | Arkansas (4–2) | Oklahoma (5–0) | Kentucky (6–2) | Kentucky (8–2) | Alabama (12–1) | Georgia Tech (12–3) | Michigan (10–3) | Georgia Tech (14–5) | Michigan (12–5) | USC (16–3) | Florida State (18–6) | Michigan (17–6) | Florida State (19–8) | Michigan State (19–7) т | Michigan (20–8) | 16. |
| 17. | Utah | Utah (1–0) | Kentucky (1–1) | Iowa (4–0) | Alabama (6–1) | Oklahoma (6–0) | Arkansas (9–2) | Seton Hall (8–2) | Syracuse (11–1) | Oklahoma (11–2) | Michigan (11–4) | Kentucky (15–5) | Michigan (14–5) | USC (17–4) | Georgetown (17–6) | Alabama (21–7) | North Carolina (19–8) т | Florida State (20–9) | 17. |
| 18. | Wake Forest | Georgia Tech (2–0) | Wake Forest (3–0) | Oklahoma (4–0) | Utah (8–1) | St. John's (4–2) | Alabama (10–1) | St. John's (8–2) | St. John's (9–3) | Georgia Tech (13–4) | Oklahoma (12–3) | USC (14–3) | Kentucky (16–5)UNLV (22–2) | Connecticut (16–5) | Cincinnati (20–4) | Michigan (17–7) | Seton Hall (20–7) | Georgetown (21–9) | 18. |
| 19. | Michigan | Wake Forest (1–0) | Utah (3–0) | Alabama (5–1) | Arkansas (5–2) | Alabama (8–1) | St. John's (6–2) | Wake Forest (7–1) | Tulane (11–0) | Tulane (13–1) | Alabama (15–4) | Oklahoma (14–4) | LSU (14–5) | Michigan (15–6) | Syracuse (16–7) | DePaul (19–6) | Georgetown (19–8) | Seton Hall (21–8) | 19. |
| 20. | Iowa | Oklahoma (1–0) | Michigan State (3–0) | Georgetown (2–1) | Missouri (6–0) | Utah (9–1) | Wake Forest (6–1) | Oklahoma (10–1) | Charlotte (11–1) | St. John's (10–4) | UTEP (16–1) | LSU (12–4) | Charlotte (16–4) | Cincinnati (19–3) | Connecticut (17–6) | Tulane (19–5) | DePaul (20–7) | Syracuse (21–9) | 20. |
| 21. | Oklahoma | Pittsburgh (2–0) | DePaul (1–0) | Wake Forest (4–1) | Georgetown (4–1) | Wake Forest (6–1) | Georgetown (7–1) | Syracuse (10–0) | Seton Hall (9–3) | Louisville (10–3) | Charlotte (13–2) | Charlotte (15–3) | UTEP (18–3) т | Seton Hall (15–6) | Florida State (18–8) | Syracuse (18–7) | St. John's (19–8) | UMass (28–4) | 21. |
| 22. | Arizona State | Michigan (0–0) | Oklahoma (3–0) | Michigan (2–0) | Wake Forest (4–1) | Louisville (6–0) | Utah (9–2) | USC (8–1) | Oklahoma (10–2) | Charlotte (11–2) | Louisville (11–4) | Georgia Tech (15–6) | Florida State (15–6) т | UTEP (18–5) | St. John's (16–7) | Seton Hall (18–7) | Oklahoma (20–7) | DePaul (20–8) | 22. |
| 23. | DePaul | Texas (2–0) | Iowa (2–0) | LSU (2–2) | Iowa (6–1) | Iowa (6–1) | USC (8–1) | Tulane (9–0) | Georgetown (9–2) | Wake Forest (9–4) | Seton Hall (11–5) т | Florida State (14–5) | Oklahoma (14–6) | St. John's (14–7) | Oklahoma (17–6) | LSU (18–7) | LSU (19–8) | St. John's (19–10) | 23. |
| 24. | Georgia Tech | DePaul (0–0) | Pittsburgh (3–1) | Missouri (4–0) | Louisville (4–0) | Georgetown (6–1) | Charlotte (7–1) | Charlotte (8–1) | Wake Forest (8–3) | UTEP (14–1) | LSU (11–4) т | St. John's (11–7) | Georgia Tech (16–7) | LSU (14–7) т | DePaul (18–6) | Oklahoma (18–7) | Tulane (20–7) | Oklahoma (21–8) | 24. |
| 25. | Texas | Iowa (1–0) | Michigan (0–0) | Virginia (3–1) | LSU (2–2) | USC (7–1) | Louisville (6–1) | UMass (11–2) | Louisville (8–3) | Stanford (11–1) | USC (13–3) | UTEP (16–3) | Cincinnati (17–3) | Oklahoma (15–6) т | Seton Hall (16–7) т Seton Hall (19–5) т | St. John's (17–8) | UMass (26–4) | Tulane (20–7) | 25. |
| | Preseason | Week 2 Nov. 25 | Week 3 Dec. 2 | Week 4 Dec. 9 | Week 5 Dec. 16 | Week 6 Dec. 23 | Week 7 Dec. 30 | Week 8 Jan. 6 | Week 9 Jan. 13 | Week 10 Jan. 20 | Week 11 Jan. 27 | Week 12 Feb. 3 | Week 13 Feb. 10 | Week 14 Feb. 17 | Week 15 Feb. 24 | Week 16 Mar. 2 | Week 17 Mar. 9 | Final Final | |
| | | Dropped: Arizona State (0–0) | Dropped: Texas | Dropped: DePaul (1–2); Pittsburgh | Dropped: Virginia | Dropped: LSU | Dropped: Iowa (7–2) | Dropped: Georgetown (7–2); Utah; Louisville (7–3) | Dropped: USC (9–2); UMass (12–3) | Dropped: Seton Hall (9–5); Georgetown (9–4) | Dropped: St. John's (10–6); Wake Forest; Stanford (11–3) | Dropped: Louisville; Seton Hall | Dropped: St. John's | Dropped: Charlotte (17–5); Georgia Tech | Dropped: LSU | Dropped: Connecticut (17–8) | Dropped: Syracuse (18–9) | Dropped: LSU (20–9) | |
