= 1992 Big South Conference men's basketball tournament =

- Classification: Division I
- Season: 1991–92
- Teams: 8
- Site: Civic Center of Anderson; Anderson, SC
- Champions: Campbell (1st title)
- Winning coach: Billy Lee (1st title)
- MVP: Mark Mocnik (Campbell)

1991–92 Big South Conference men's basketball standings
	Conf.				Overall
Team	W		L	PCT	W		L	PCT
Radford	12	–	2	.857	20	–	9	.690
Liberty	10	–	4	.714	22	–	7	.759
Campbell †	7	–	7	.500	19	–	12	.613
Charleston Southern	7	–	7	.500	16	–	14	.533
Coastal Carolina	6	–	8	.429	12	–	19	.387
Davidson	6	–	8	.429	11	–	17	.393
UNC Asheville	6	–	8	.429	9	–	19	.321
Winthrop	2	–	12	.143	6	–	22	.214
† 1992 Big South tournament winner Rankings from AP Poll

The 1992 Big South Conference men's basketball tournament took place March 5–7, 1992, at the Civic Center of Anderson in Anderson, South Carolina. For the first time in their school history, the Campbell Fighting Camels won the tournament, led by head coach Billy Lee. The Fighting Camels secured the Big South's automatic bid to the 1992 NCAA tournament, marking the first time that a Big South tournament champion advanced directly to the NCAA tournament (the tournament champion did not receive a bid in 1986-90, and the 1991 champion played an additional play-in game to advance to that tournament's official draw.)

This was Campbell's first and (as of 2021) only NCAA tournament appearance.

== Format ==
All of the conference's eight members participated in the tournament, hosted at the Civic Center of Anderson. This was the first season for Liberty as a member of the conference, and the last for Davidson.

== Bracket ==
Quarterfinals; March 5
1	Radford	80
8	Winthrop	54
4	Charleston Southern	58
5	Coastal Carolina	54
3	Campbell	69
6	Davidson	60
2	Liberty	85
7	UNC Asheville	54

Semifinals; March 6
1	Radford	83
4	Charleston Southern	88
2	Liberty	51
3	Campbell	53

Finals; March 7
3	Campbell	67
4	Charleston Southern	53

* Asterisk indicates overtime game

- Source

== All-Tournament Team ==
- Mark Mocnik, Campbell
- Billy Ellison, Campbell
- Joe Spinks, Campbell
- Bernard Nelson, Charleston Southern
- Darnell Sneed, Charleston Southern
