= 1991–92 Oklahoma State Cowboys basketball team =

American college basketball season

1991–92 Oklahoma State Cowboys basketball

Preseason NIT champions

NCAA tournament, Sweet Sixteen
- Conference: Big Eight Conference

Ranking
- Coaches: No. 10
- AP: No. 11
- Record: 28–8 (8–6 Big Eight)
- Head coach: Eddie Sutton (2nd season)
- Assistant coaches: Bill Self (6th season); Rob Evans (2nd season); Russ Pennell (2nd season)
- Home arena: Gallagher-Iba Arena (Capacity: 6,381)

1991–92 Big Eight Conference men's basketball standings
	Conf.				Overall
Team	W		L	PCT	W		L	PCT
No. 2 Kansas †	11	–	3	.786	27	–	5	.844
No. 11 Oklahoma State	8	–	6	.571	28	–	8	.778
No. 16 Missouri	8	–	6	.571	21	–	9	.700
No. 23 Oklahoma	8	–	6	.571	21	–	9	.700
Nebraska	7	–	7	.500	19	–	10	.655
Iowa State	5	–	9	.357	21	–	13	.618
Kansas State	5	–	9	.357	16	–	14	.533
Colorado	4	–	10	.286	13	–	15	.464
† 1992 Big Eight tournament winner As of April 6, 1992; Rankings from AP poll

The 1991–92 Oklahoma State Cowboys basketball team represented Oklahoma State University as a member of the Big Eight Conference during the 1991–92 NCAA Division I men's basketball season. The team was led by second-year head coach Eddie Sutton and played their home games at Gallagher-Iba Arena. The Cowboys won their first 20 games and rose to the No. 2 ranking in both major polls. They finished with a record of 28–8 (8–6 Big Eight) and tied for second in Big Eight regular season play.

Oklahoma State received an at-large bid to the NCAA tournament as No. 2 seed in the Southeast region. After defeating Georgia Southern in the opening round, the Cowboys defeated Tulane to reach the Sweet Sixteen. The run ended in the Southeast regional semifinal, as Michigan defeated OSU 75–72.

== Roster ==
1991–92 Oklahoma State Cowboys men's basketball team
Players
Coaches

Pos.	#	Name	Height	Weight	Year	Previous school	Hometown
G	5	Corey Williams	6 ft 2 in (1.88 m)	185 lb (84 kg)	Sr	Northeast	Macon, Georgia
G	20	Sean Sutton	—	—	Sr
PF	35	Byron Houston	6 ft 5 in (1.96 m)	240 lb (109 kg)	Sr	Star Spencer	Spencer, Oklahoma
C	50	Bryant Reeves	7 ft 0 in (2.13 m)	265 lb (120 kg)	Fr	Gans	Gans, Oklahoma

Head coach

- Eddie Sutton

Assistant coach(es)

- Bill Self
- Rob Evans
- Russ Pennell
- Steve Anthis

Legend

- (C) Team captain
- (S) Suspended
- (I) Ineligible
- (W) Walk-on
- Injured
- Current redshirt

== Schedule and results ==
Date time, TV	Rank^{#}	Opponent^{#}	Result	Record	Site (attendance) city, state
Regular season
Nov 21, 1991*	No. 13	Evansville; Preseason NIT	W 86–57	1–0	Gallagher-Iba Arena; Stillwater, Oklahoma
Nov 23, 1991*	No. 13	Purdue; Preseason NIT	W 76–48	2–0	Gallagher-Iba Arena; Stillwater, Oklahoma
Nov 25, 1991*	No. 11	Tennessee State; Preseason NIT	W 89–58	3–0	Gallagher-Iba Arena; Stillwater, Oklahoma
Nov 27, 1991*	No. 11	vs. No. 24 Pittsburgh; Preseason NIT Semifinal	W 74–63	4–0	Madison Square Garden; New York, New York
Nov 29, 1991*	No. 11	vs. No. 18 Georgia Tech; Preseason NIT Championship	W 78–71	5–0	Madison Square Garden; New York, New York
Dec 4, 1991*	No. 8	New Orleans	W 63–55 ^{OT}	6–0	Gallagher-Iba Arena; Stillwater, Oklahoma
Dec 7, 1991*	No. 8	vs. California	W 76–62	7–0	Tulsa Convention Center; Tulsa, Oklahoma
Dec 10, 1991*	No. 6	at Louisiana Tech	W 77–71	8–0	Thomas Assembly Center; Ruston, Louisiana
Dec 14, 1991*	No. 6	Wichita State	W 82–54	9–0	Gallagher-Iba Arena; Stillwater, Oklahoma
Dec 21, 1991*	No. 5	Houston Baptist	W 100–57	10–0	Gallagher-Iba Arena; Stillwater, Oklahoma
Dec 29, 1991*	No. 3	at Tulsa	W 82–76	11–0	Tulsa Convention Center; Tulsa, Oklahoma
Dec 21, 1991*	No. 3	Midwestern State	W 85–45	12–0	Gallagher-Iba Arena; Stillwater, Oklahoma
Jan 6, 1992	No. 3	Kansas State	W 72–34	13–0 (1–0)	Gallagher-Iba Arena; Stillwater, Oklahoma
Jan 11, 1992*	No. 3	UMKC	W 86–58	14–0	Gallagher-Iba Arena; Stillwater, Oklahoma
Jan 14, 1992*	No. 3	Marquette	W 64–52	15–0	Gallagher-Iba Arena; Stillwater, Oklahoma
Jan 18, 1992	No. 3	No. 24 Iowa State	W 85–67	16–0 (2–0)	Gallagher-Iba Arena; Stillwater, Oklahoma
Jan 20, 1992	No. 3	at No. 17 Oklahoma; Bedlam Series	W 92–89	17–0 (3–0)	Lloyd Noble Center; Norman, Oklahoma
Jan 25, 1992	No. 3	at Oral Roberts	W 81–61	18–0	Mabee Center; Tulsa, Oklahoma
Jan 28, 1992*	No. 3	at SMU	W 64–53	19–0	Moody Coliseum; Dallas, Texas
Feb 2, 1992	No. 3	No. 8 Missouri	W 84–61	20–0 (4–0)	Gallagher-Iba Arena; Stillwater, Oklahoma
Feb 5, 1992	No. 2	at Nebraska	L 69–85	20–1 (4–1)	Bob Devaney Sports Center; Lincoln, Nebraska
Feb 8, 1992	No. 2	No. 3 Kansas	W 64–58	21–1 (5–1)	Gallagher-Iba Arena; Stillwater, Oklahoma
Feb 12, 1992	No. 2	at Colorado	L 53–57	21–2 (5–2)	Coors Events/Conference Center; Boulder, Colorado
Feb 15, 1992	No. 2	at Iowa State	L 83–84 ^{OT}	21–3 (5–3)	Hilton Coliseum; Ames, Iowa
Feb 19, 1992	No. 8	Oklahoma	L 67–70	21–4 (5–4)	Gallagher-Iba Arena; Stillwater, Oklahoma
Feb 23, 1992	No. 8	at No. 9 Missouri	L 52–66	21–5 (5–5)	Hearnes Center; Columbia, Missouri
Feb 25, 1992	No. 14	No. 25 Nebraska	W 72–51	22–5 (6–5)	Gallagher-Iba Arena; Stillwater, Oklahoma
Mar 2, 1992	No. 12	at No. 3 Kansas	L 64–77	22–6 (6–6)	Allen Fieldhouse; Lawrence, Kansas
Mar 4, 1992	No. 12	Colorado	W 69–63	23–6 (7–6)	Gallagher-Iba Arena; Stillwater, Oklahoma
Mar 7, 1992	No. 12	at Kansas State	W 77–69	24–6 (8–6)	Bramlage Coliseum; Manhattan, Kansas
Big Eight tournament
Mar 13, 1992*	(2) No. 11	vs. (7) Kansas State; Big Eight Tournament Quarterfinal	W 81–57	25–6	Kemper Arena; Kansas City, Missouri
Mar 14, 1992*	(2) No. 11	vs. (6) Iowa State; Big Eight Tournament Semifinal	W 69–60	26–6	Kemper Arena; Kansas City, Missouri
Mar 15, 1992*	(2) No. 11	vs. (1) No. 3 Kansas; Big Eight tournament championship	L 57–66	26–7	Kemper Arena; Kansas City, Missouri
NCAA tournament
Mar 20, 1992*	(2 SE) No. 11	vs. (15 SE) Georgia Southern; First round	W 100–73	27–7	Omni Coliseum (10,820); Atlanta, Georgia
Mar 22, 1992*	(2 SE) No. 11	vs. (10 SE) Tulane; Second Round	W 87–71	28–7	Omni Coliseum; Atlanta, Georgia
Mar 27, 1992*	(2 SE) No. 11	vs. (6 SE) No. 15 Michigan; Southeast Regional semifinal – Sweet Sixteen	L 72–75	28–8	Rupp Arena; Lexington, Kentucky
*Non-conference game. ^{#}Rankings from AP Poll. (#) Tournament seedings in parentheses. SE=Southeast. All times are in Central Time.

== Awards and honors ==
- Byron Houston – Consensus Second-Team All-American

== NBA draft ==
Round	Pick	Player	NBA club
1	27	Byron Houston	Chicago Bulls
2	33	Corey Williams	Chicago Bulls
