= 1991–92 Iowa State Cyclones men's basketball team =

American college basketball season

1991–92 Iowa State Cyclones men's basketball

NCAA Tournament second round
- Conference: Big Eight Conference
- Record: 21-13 (5-9 Big Eight)
- Head coach: Johnny Orr (12th season)
- Home arena: Hilton Coliseum

1991–92 Big Eight Conference men's basketball standings
	Conf.				Overall
Team	W		L	PCT	W		L	PCT
No. 2 Kansas †	11	–	3	.786	27	–	5	.844
No. 11 Oklahoma State	8	–	6	.571	28	–	8	.778
No. 16 Missouri	8	–	6	.571	21	–	9	.700
No. 23 Oklahoma	8	–	6	.571	21	–	9	.700
Nebraska	7	–	7	.500	19	–	10	.655
Iowa State	5	–	9	.357	21	–	13	.618
Kansas State	5	–	9	.357	16	–	14	.533
Colorado	4	–	10	.286	13	–	15	.464
† 1992 Big Eight tournament winner As of April 6, 1992; Rankings from AP poll

The 1991–92 Iowa State Cyclones men's basketball team represented Iowa State University during the 1991–92 NCAA Division I men's basketball season. The Cyclones were coached by Johnny Orr, who was in his 12th season. They played their home games at Hilton Coliseum in Ames, Iowa.

They finished the season 21–13, 5–9 in Big Eight play to finish tied for seventh place. They upset third-seeded Missouri in the 1992 Big Eight conference tournament quarterfinals before falling to Oklahoma State in the semifinals. Despite a 5–9 conference record, the Cyclones qualified for the 1992 NCAA Division I men's basketball tournament, upsetting seventh seed UNC Charlotte, 76–74 in the East Regional first round before falling to second seeded Kentucky.

Games were televised by ESPN, CBS, Raycom, Prime Sports, the Cyclone Television Network and Heritage Cablevision (Drake Television Network).

== Previous season ==
The previous season the Cyclones finished the season 12–19, 6–8 in Big Eight play to finish in fifth place. They lost to Missouri in the 1991 Big Eight conference tournament quarterfinals.

== Roster ==
Roster
Name	Position
Fred Hoiberg	Guard
Loren Meyer	Center
Julius Michalik	Forward
Hurl Beechum	Forward
Justus Thigpen	Guard
Ron Bayless	Guard
Howard Eaton	Forward
Norman Brown	Forward
Skip McCoy	Guard
Donnell Bivens	Forward
Mike Bergman	Forward
Brad Pippett	Forward
Brian Pearson	Guard
Saun Jackson	Forward
Greg Hester	Guard

== Schedule and results ==
Date time, TV	Rank^{#}	Opponent^{#}	Result	Record	Site city, state
Exhibition
November 7, 1991*; 7:00 pm		Fort Sill; Exhibition	W 126-58		Hilton Coliseum (10,052); Ames, Iowa
November 14, 1991*; 7:00 pm		Ukraine National; Exhibition	W 91-72		Hilton Coliseum; Ames, Iowa
Regular season
November 24, 1991*; 6:00 pm, Cyclone Television Network		Maryland-Eastern Shore	W 114-59	1-0	Hilton Coliseum; Ames, Iowa
November 26, 1991*; 7:00 pm, Cyclone Television Network		Creighton	W 92-75	2-0	Hilton Coliseum; Ames, Iowa
November 29, 1991*; 2:00 pm CT		vs. TCU; San Juan Shootout Quarterfinals	L 52-53	2-1	Eugenio Guerra Sports Complex; Bayamón, PR
November 30, 1991*; 2:00 pm CT		at American University – Puerto Rico; San Juan Shootout Consolation Semifinals	W 108-74	3-1	Eugenio Guerra Sports Complex; Bayamón, PR
December 1, 1991*; 2:00 pm CT		vs. Maine; San Juan Shootout Third Place	W 70-63	4-1	Eugenio Guerra Sports Complex; Bayamón, PR
December 7, 1991*; 7:00 pm, Cyclone Television Network		Northern Iowa; Iowa Big Four	W 84-66	5-1	Hilton Coliseum; Ames, Iowa
December 7, 1991*; 7:00 pm, Cyclone Television Network		Texas–Arlington	W 96-82	6-1	Hilton Coliseum; Ames, Iowa
December 14, 1991*; 7:00 pm, Cyclone Television Network		No. 16 Iowa; Cy-Hawk Rivalry	W 98-84	7-1	Hilton Coliseum; Ames, Iowa
December 27, 1991*; 7:30 pm, Cyclone Television Network		vs. Fairfield; Adbow's Naismith Holiday Classic Semifinals	W 92-59	8-1	Springfield Civic Center; Springfield, Massachusetts
December 28, 1991*; 7:30 pm, Cyclone Television Network		vs. UMass; Adbow's Naismith Holiday Classic Championship	L 53-73	8-2	Springfield Civic Center; Springfield, Massachusetts
December 31, 1991*; 7:00 pm, Cyclone Television Network		Nebraska-Omaha	W 114-57	9-2	Hilton Coliseum; Ames, Iowa
January 4, 1992*; 1:30 pm, Cyclone Television Network		at Minnesota	W 76-73	10-2	Williams Arena; Minneapolis, Minnesota
January 7, 1992*; 7:00 pm, Cyclone Television Network		Loyola-Chicago	W 92-69	11-2	Hilton Coliseum; Ames, Iowa
January 11, 1992; 1:00 pm, Raycom		No. 21 Oklahoma	W 73-71	12-2 (1-0)	Hilton Coliseum; Ames, Iowa
January 15, 1992*; 7:00 pm, Cyclone Television Network	No. 24	Morningside	W 92-55	13-2	Hilton Coliseum; Ames, Iowa
January 18, 1992; 1:00 pm, Raycom	No. 24	at No. 3 Oklahoma State	L 67-85	13-3 (1-1)	Gallagher-Iba Arena; Stillwater, Oklahoma
January 21, 1992*; 7:00 pm, Heritage Cablevision		at Drake; Iowa Big Four	W 92-61	14-3	Veterans Memorial Auditorium; Des Moines, Iowa
January 25, 1992; 1:00 pm, Raycom		Kansas State	W 85-59	15-3 (2-1)	Hilton Coliseum; Ames, Iowa
January 27, 1992*; 8:00 pm, Cyclone Television Network		Chicago State	W 114-76	16-3	Hilton Coliseum; Ames, Iowa
February 1, 1992; 7:00 pm, Prime Sports Network		at Nebraska	L 63-68	16-4 (2-2)	Devaney Sports Center; Lincoln, Nebraska
February 5, 1992; 7:00 pm, Cyclone Television Network		at No. 12 Missouri	L 71-81	16-5 (2-3)	Hearnes Center; Columbia, Missouri
February 10, 1992; 8:30 pm, ESPN		Colorado	W 96-82 ^{OT}	17-5 (3-3)	Hilton Coliseum; Ames, Iowa
February 12, 1992; 7:00 pm, Cyclone Television Network		at No. 4 Kansas	L 61-90	17-6 (3-4)	Allen Fieldhouse; Lawrence, Kansas
February 15, 1992; 3:00 pm, Raycom		No. 2 Oklahoma State	W 84-83 ^{OT}	18-6 (4-4)	Hilton Coliseum; Ames, Iowa
February 19, 1992; 8:00 pm, Cyclone Television Network	No. 23	at Kansas State	L 55-64	18-7 (4-5)	Bramlage Coliseum; Manhattan, Kansas
February 22, 1992; 1:00 pm, Raycom	No. 23	Nebraska	L 70-80	18-8 (4-6)	Hilton Coliseum; Ames, Iowa
February 26, 1992; 7:00 pm, Cyclone Television Network		No. 6 Missouri	L 71-75	18-9 (4-7)	Hilton Coliseum; Ames, Iowa
February 29, 1992; 3:00 pm, Raycom		Oklahoma	L 70-96	18-10 (4-8)	Lloyd Noble Center; Norman, Oklahoma
March 4, 1992; 7:00 pm, Cyclone Television Network		No. 3 Kansas	W 70-66	19-10 (5-8)	Hilton Coliseum; Ames, Iowa
March 7, 1992; 3:00 pm, Raycom		at Colorado	L 83-87	19-11 (5-9)	Coors Events Center; Boulder, Colorado
Big Eight tournament
March 13, 1992; 8:20 pm, Raycom		vs. No. 13 Missouri; Big Eight tournament quarterfinals	W 80-75	20-11	Kemper Arena; Kansas City, Missouri
March 14, 1992; 3:20 pm, Raycom		vs. No. 11 Oklahoma State; Big Eight tournament semifinals	L 60-69	20-12	Kemper Arena; Kansas City, Missouri
NCAA Tournament
March 20, 1992*; 1:30 pm, CBS		vs. No. (7 seed) UNC Charlotte; NCAA East Regional First round	W 76-74	21-12	Centrum in Worcester; Worcester, Massachusetts
March 22, 1992*; 2:00 pm, CBS		vs. No. 6 (2 seed) Kentucky; NCAA East Regional Second Round	L 98-106	21-13	Centrum in Worcester; Worcester, Massachusetts
*Non-conference game. ^{#}Rankings from AP poll. (#) Tournament seedings in parentheses. All times are in Central Time.

== Awards and honors ==
- All-Big Eight Selections
  Justus Thigpen (2nd)
  Julius Michalik (HM)
  Ron Bayless (HM)
  Fred Hoiberg (HM)
- Big Eight Freshman of the Year
  Fred Hoiberg
- Academic All-Big Eight
  Mike Bergman
  Greg Hester
- Ralph Olsen Award
  Justus Thigpen
