= 1992 NCAA Division I men's basketball tournament =

Edition of USA college basketball tournament

- Season: 1991–92
- Teams: 64
- Finals site: Hubert H. Humphrey Metrodome, Minneapolis, Minnesota
- Champions: Duke Blue Devils (2nd title, 6th title game, 10th Final Four)
- Runner-up: Michigan Wolverines (vacated) (4th title game, 5th Final Four)
- Semifinalists: Cincinnati Bearcats (6th Final Four); Indiana Hoosiers (7th Final Four)
- Winning coach: Mike Krzyzewski (2nd title)
- MOP: Bobby Hurley (Duke)
- Attendance: 580,462
- Top scorer: Christian Laettner (Duke) (115 points)

The 1992 NCAA Division I men's basketball tournament involved 64 colleges playing in single-elimination play to determine the national champion of men's NCAA Division I college basketball. The 54th annual edition of the tournament began on March 19, 1992, and ended with the championship game on April 6, at the Hubert H. Humphrey Metrodome in Minneapolis. A total of 63 games were played.

Duke, coached by Mike Krzyzewski, defeated Michigan, coached by Steve Fisher, 71–51 to claim their second consecutive national championship. Bobby Hurley of Duke was named the tournament's Most Outstanding Player. Michigan subsequently vacated its final two tournament games due to sanctions involving the eligibility of Chris Webber in the University of Michigan basketball scandal.

This tournament is best remembered for the East regional final pitting Duke and Kentucky at The Spectrum in Philadelphia. With 2.1 seconds remaining in overtime, Duke trailed 103–102. Grant Hill threw a pass the length of the court to Christian Laettner, who dribbled once, turned, and hit a jumper as time expired for the 104–103 win. Sports Illustrated deemed it the greatest college basketball game of all time, and ESPN ranked it No. 17 among the top 100 sports moments of the past 25 years (see ESPN25). In 2002, USA Today ranked it the greatest NCAA tournament game of all time.

The tournament also saw dark horse Cincinnati crash the Final Four and return to national prominence.

== Schedule and venues ==
1992 first and second rounds
1992 Regionals (blue) and Final Four (red)

The following are the sites that were selected to host each round of the 1992 tournament:

First and Second Rounds

- March 19 and 21
  - East Region
    - Greensboro Coliseum, Greensboro, North Carolina (Host: Atlantic Coast Conference)
  - Midwest Region
    - Bradley Center, Milwaukee, Wisconsin (Hosts: Marquette University, Great Midwest Conference)
  - Southeast Region
    - Riverfront Coliseum, Cincinnati, Ohio (Hosts: University of Cincinnati, Xavier University)
  - West Region
    - BSU Pavilion, Boise, Idaho (Host: Boise State University)
- March 20 and 22
  - East Region
    - Centrum in Worcester, Worcester, Massachusetts (Host: College of the Holy Cross)
  - Midwest Region
    - University of Dayton Arena, Dayton, Ohio (Host: University of Dayton)
  - Southeast Region
    - Omni Coliseum, Atlanta, Georgia (Host: Georgia Institute of Technology)
  - West Region
    - ASU Activity Center, Tempe, Arizona (Host: Arizona State University)

Regional semifinals and finals (Sweet Sixteen and Elite Eight)

- March 26 and 28
  - East Regional, Spectrum, Philadelphia, Pennsylvania (Hosts: Temple University, Villanova University)
  - West Regional, University Arena ("The Pit"), Albuquerque, New Mexico (Host: University of New Mexico)
- March 27 and 29
  - Midwest Regional, Kemper Arena, Kansas City, Missouri (Host: Big 8 Conference)
  - Southeast Regional, Rupp Arena, Lexington, Kentucky (Host: University of Kentucky)

National semifinals and championship (Final Four and championship)

- April 4 and 6
  - Hubert H. Humphrey Metrodome, Minneapolis, Minnesota (Host: University of Minnesota)

This year marked the first time since 1985 the East Regional semifinals and final were not held at the Meadowlands Arena (then known as Brendan Byrne Arena) in East Rutherford, New Jersey.

== Teams ==
There were 30 automatic bids awarded to the tournament - of these, 27 were given to the winners of their conference's tournament, while three were awarded to the team with the best regular-season record in their conference (Big Ten, Ivy League and Pac-10).

Three conferences, the East Coast Conference, Great Midwest Conference, and Metro Conference, did not receive automatic bids to the tournament. This meant that the play-in games played prior to the 1991 tournament were not necessary for the 1992 tournament.

Three conference champions made their first NCAA tournament appearances: Campbell (Big South), Delaware (NAC), and Eastern Illinois (Mid-Continent). Additionally, Tulane received an at-large bid for its first appearance in the NCAA tournament.

=== Automatic qualifiers ===
Automatic qualifiers
Conference	Team	Appearance	Last bid
ACC	Duke	17th	1991
Atlantic 10	UMass	2nd	1962
Big East	Syracuse	20th	1991
Big Eight	Kansas	21st	1991
Big Sky	Montana	3rd	1991
Big South	Campbell	1st	Never
Big Ten	Ohio State	18th	1991
Big West	New Mexico State (vacated)	–	1991
CAA	Old Dominion	5th	1986
Ivy League	Princeton	18th	1991
MAAC	La Salle	11th	1990
MAC	Miami (OH)	13th	1986
MCC	Evansville	3rd	1989
MEAC	Howard	2nd	1981
Mid-Continent	Eastern Illinois	1st	Never
Missouri Valley	Southwest Missouri State	5th	1990
NAC	Delaware	1st	Never
NEC	Robert Morris	5th	1990
Ohio Valley	Murray State	6th	1991
Pac-10	UCLA	27th	1991
Patriot	Fordham	4th	1971
SEC	Kentucky	33rd	1987
Southern	East Tennessee State	5th	1991
Southland	Northeast Louisiana	5th	1991
Sun Belt	Southwestern Louisiana	3rd	1983
SWAC	Mississippi Valley State	2nd	1986
SWC	Houston	18th	1990
TAAC	Georgia Southern	3rd	1987
WAC	BYU	16th	1991
West Coast	Pepperdine	10th	1991

=== Tournament seeds ===
East Regional – Spectrum, Philadelphia, Pennsylvania
Seed	School	Conference	Record	Berth type
1	Duke	ACC	28–2	Automatic
2	Kentucky	SEC	26–6	Automatic
3	UMass	Atlantic 10	28–4	Automatic
4	Seton Hall	Big East	21–8	At-Large
5	Missouri	Big Eight	20–8	At-Large
6	Syracuse	Big East	21–9	Automatic
7	UNC Charlotte	Metro	23–8	At-Large
8	Texas	SWC	23–11	At-Large
9	Iowa	Big Ten	18–10	At-Large
10	Iowa State	Big Eight	20–12	At-Large
11	Princeton	Ivy League	22–5	Automatic
12	West Virginia	Atlantic 10	20–11	At-Large
13	La Salle	MAAC	20–10	Automatic
14	Fordham	Patriot	18–12	Automatic
15	Old Dominion	CAA	15–14	Automatic
16	Campbell	Big South	19–11	Automatic

West Regional – The Pit, Albuquerque, New Mexico
Seed	School	Conference	Record	Berth type
1	UCLA	Pac-10	25–4	Automatic
2	Indiana	Big Ten	23–6	At-Large
3	Florida State	ACC	20–9	At-Large
4	Oklahoma	Big Eight	21–8	At-Large
5	DePaul	Great Midwest	20–8	At-Large
6	Georgetown	Big East	21–9	At-Large
7	LSU	SEC	20–9	At-Large
8	Louisville	Metro	18–10	At-Large
9	Wake Forest	ACC	17–11	At-Large
10	BYU	WAC	25–6	Automatic
11	South Florida	Metro	19–9	At-Large
12	New Mexico State (vacated)	Big West	23–7	Automatic
13	Southwestern Louisiana	Sun Belt	20–10	Automatic
14	Montana	Big Sky	27–3	Automatic
15	Eastern Illinois	Mid-Continent	17–13	Automatic
16	Robert Morris	NEC	19–11	Automatic

Midwest Regional – Hy-Vee Arena, Kansas City, Missouri
Seed	School	Conference	Record	Berth type
1	Kansas	Big Eight	26–4	Automatic
2	USC	Pac-10	23–5	At-Large
3	Arkansas	SEC	25–7	At-Large
4	Cincinnati	Great Midwest	25–4	At-Large
5	Michigan State	Big Ten	21–7	At-Large
6	Memphis State	Great Midwest	20–10	At-Large
7	Georgia Tech	ACC	21–11	At-Large
8	Evansville	MCC	24–5	Automatic
9	UTEP	WAC	25–6	At-Large
10	Houston	SWC	25–5	Automatic
11	Pepperdine	West Coast	24–6	Automatic
12	Southwest Missouri State	Missouri Valley	23–7	Automatic
13	Delaware	NAC	27–3	Automatic
14	Murray State	Ohio Valley	17–12	Automatic
15	Northeast Louisiana	Southland	19–9	Automatic
16	Howard	MEAC	17–13	Automatic

Southeast Regional – Rupp Arena, Lexington, Kentucky
Seed	School	Conference	Record	Berth type
1	Ohio State	Big Ten	23–5	Automatic
2	Oklahoma State	Big Eight	26–7	At-Large
3	Arizona	Pac-10	24–6	At-Large
4	North Carolina	ACC	21–9	At-Large
5	Alabama	SEC	25–8	At-Large
6	Michigan (vacated Final Four)	Big Ten	20–8	At-Large
7	St. John's	Big East	19–10	At-Large
8	Nebraska	Big Eight	19–9	At-Large
9	Connecticut	Big East	19–9	At-Large
10	Tulane	Metro	21–8	At-Large
11	Temple	Atlantic 10	17–12	At-Large
12	Stanford	Pac-10	18–10	At-Large
13	Miami (OH)	MAC	23–7	Automatic
14	East Tennessee State	Southern	23–6	Automatic
15	Georgia Southern	TAAC	25–5	Automatic
16	Mississippi Valley State	SWAC	16–13	Automatic

== Bracket ==
=== East Regional – Philadelphia, Pennsylvania ===
First round
1	Duke	82
16	Campbell	56
Greensboro
8	Texas	92
9	Iowa	98
5	Missouri	89
12	West Virginia	78
Greensboro
4	Seton Hall	78
13	La Salle	76
6	Syracuse	51
11	Princeton	43
Worcester
3	Massachusetts	85
14	Fordham	58
7	Charlotte	74
10	Iowa State	76
Worcester
2	Kentucky	88
15	Old Dominion	69

Quarter-finals
1	Duke	75
9	Iowa	62
5	Missouri	71
4	Seton Hall	88
6	Syracuse	71
3	Massachusetts	77^{OT}
10	Iowa State	98
2	Kentucky	106

Regional semifinals
1	Duke	81
4	Seton Hall	68
3	Massachusetts	77
2	Kentucky	87

Regional Finals
1	Duke	104^{OT}
2	Kentucky	103

=== West Regional – Albuquerque, New Mexico ===
First round
1	UCLA	73
16	Robert Morris	53
Tempe
8	Louisville	81
9	Wake Forest	58
5	DePaul	73
12	~~New Mexico State~~	81
Tempe
4	Oklahoma	83
13	SW Louisiana	87
6	Georgetown	75
11	South Florida	60
Boise
3	Florida State	78
14	Montana	68
7	LSU	94
10	BYU	83
Boise
2	Indiana	94
15	Eastern Illinois	55

Quarter-finals
1	UCLA	85
8	Louisville	69
12	~~New Mexico State~~	81
13	SW Louisiana	73
6	Georgetown	68
3	Florida State	78
7	LSU	79
2	Indiana	89

Regional semifinals
1	UCLA	85
12	~~New Mexico State~~	78
3	Florida State	74
2	Indiana	85

Regional Finals
1	UCLA	79
2	Indiana	106

New Mexico State vacated its appearance in the 1992 NCAA tournament due to sanctions from the Neil McCarthy scandal. Unlike forfeiture, a vacated game does not result in the other school being credited with a win, only with New Mexico State removing the wins from its own record.

=== Southeast Regional – Lexington, Kentucky ===
First round
1	Ohio State	83
16	Mississippi Valley State	56
Cincinnati
8	Nebraska	65
9	Connecticut	86
5	Alabama	80
12	Stanford	75
Cincinnati
4	North Carolina	68
13	Miami (OH)	63
6	Michigan	73
11	Temple	66
Atlanta
3	Arizona	80
14	East Tennessee State	87
7	St. John's	57
10	Tulane	61
Atlanta
2	Oklahoma State	100
15	Georgia Southern	73

Quarter-finals
1	Ohio State	78
9	Connecticut	55
5	Alabama	55
4	North Carolina	64
6	Michigan	102
14	East Tennessee State	90
10	Tulane	71
2	Oklahoma State	87

Regional semifinals
1	Ohio State	80
4	North Carolina	73
6	Michigan	75
2	Oklahoma State	72

Regional Finals
1	Ohio State	71
6	Michigan	75^{OT}

=== Midwest Regional – Kansas City, Missouri ===
First round
1	Kansas	100
16	Howard	67
Dayton
8	Evansville	50
9	UTEP	55
5	Michigan State	61
12	Southwest Missouri State	54
Dayton
4	Cincinnati	85
13	Delaware	47
6	Memphis State	80
11	Pepperdine	70
Milwaukee
3	Arkansas	80
14	Murray State	69
7	Georgia Tech	65
10	Houston	60
Milwaukee
2	USC	84
15	Northeast Louisiana	54

Quarter-finals
1	Kansas	60
9	UTEP	66
5	Michigan State	65
4	Cincinnati	77
6	Memphis State	82
3	Arkansas	80
7	Georgia Tech	79
2	USC	78

Regional semifinals
9	UTEP	67
4	Cincinnati	69
6	Memphis State	83^{OT}
7	Georgia Tech	79

Regional Finals
4	Cincinnati	88
6	Memphis State	57

=== Final Four – Minneapolis, Minnesota ===
National semifinals
E1	Duke	81
W2	Indiana	78
SE6	~~Michigan~~	76
MW4	Cincinnati	72

National Championship Game
E1	Duke	71
SE6	~~Michigan~~	51

Michigan's final two games in the 1992 Final Four were vacated on November 7, 2002, as part of the settlement of the University of Michigan basketball scandal due to Chris Webber’s ineligibility. Unlike forfeiture, a vacated game does not result in the other school being credited with a win, only with the removal of any Michigan wins from all records.

== Announcers ==
- Jim Nantz/Billy Packer/Curry Kirkpatrick – Southeast Regional at Lexington, Kentucky; Final Four at Minneapolis, Minnesota
- Dick Stockton and Al McGuire/Greg Kelser (afternoon session of first round only) – First & Second Round at Milwaukee, Wisconsin; Midwest Regional at Kansas City, Missouri
- Verne Lundquist/Len Elmore/Lesley Visser – First & Second Round at Cincinnati; East Regional at Philadelphia, Pennsylvania
- Greg Gumbel and Quinn Buckner – First & Second Round at Atlanta, Georgia; West Regional at Albuquerque, New Mexico
- James Brown and Bill Raftery – First & Second Round at Worcester, Massachusetts
- Tim Ryan and Digger Phelps – First & Second Round at Dayton, Ohio
- Sean McDonough and Bill Walton – First & Second Round at Boise, Idaho
- Brad Nessler and Ann Meyers – First & Second Round at Tempe, Arizona
- Mel Proctor and Dan Bonner – First & Second Round at Greensboro, North Carolina

== See also ==
- 1992 NCAA Division II men's basketball tournament
- 1992 NCAA Division III men's basketball tournament
- 1992 NCAA Division I women's basketball tournament
- 1992 NCAA Division II women's basketball tournament
- 1992 NCAA Division III women's basketball tournament
- 1992 National Invitation Tournament
- 1992 National Women's Invitation Tournament
- 1992 NAIA Division I men's basketball tournament
- 1992 NAIA Division II men's basketball tournament
- 1992 NAIA Division I women's basketball tournament
- 1992 NAIA Division II women's basketball tournament
