= 1991–92 Notre Dame Fighting Irish men's basketball team =

American college basketball season

1991–92 Notre Dame Fighting Irish men's basketball

NIT, Finals
- Conference: Independent
- Record: 18–15
- Head coach: John MacLeod (1st season)
- Home arena: Joyce Center

1991–92 NCAA Division I men's basketball independents standings
	Conf.				Overall
Team	W		L	PCT	W		L	PCT
UMKC	-	–	-	–	21	–	7	.750
Penn State	-	–	-	–	21	–	8	.724
UW-Milwaukee	-	–	-	–	20	–	8	.714
Southern Utah	-	–	-	–	20	–	8	.714
College of Charleston	-	–	-	–	19	–	8	.704
Notre Dame	-	–	-	–	18	–	15	.545
Cal State Northridge	-	–	-	–	11	–	17	.393
Northeastern Illinois	-	–	-	–	8	–	20	.286
Chicago State	-	–	-	–	7	–	21	.250
UNC Greensboro	-	–	-	–	7	–	21	.250
Youngstown State	-	–	-	–	6	–	22	.214
Sacramento State	-	–	-	–	4	–	24	.143
Rankings from AP Poll

The 1991–92 Notre Dame Fighting Irish men's basketball team represented the University of Notre Dame during the 1991-92 college basketball season. The Fighting Irish, led by first-year coach John MacLeod, played their home games at the Joyce Center located in Notre Dame, IN as Independent members. They finished the season 18–15 and were invited to the 1992 National Invitation Tournament, where they advanced to the championship game before losing to Virginia 81–76 in overtime. During the season, they defeated five AP Top 25 teams.

== Roster ==
1991–92 Notre Dame Fighting Irish men's basketball team
Players
Coaches

Pos.	#	Name	Height	Weight	Year	Hometown
PG	12	Elmer Bennett	6 ft 0 in (1.83 m)	165 lb (75 kg)	Sr	Bellaire, Texas
PF	20	LaPhonso Ellis	6 ft 8 in (2.03 m)	230 lb (104 kg)	Sr	East St. Louis, Illinois
F	30	Billy Taylor	6 ft 5 in (1.96 m)	—	Fr	Aurora, Illinois
C	43	Keith Tower	6 ft 11 in (2.11 m)	240 lb (109 kg)	Sr	Coraopolis, Pennsylvania
F	3	Monty Williams	6 ft 8 in (2.03 m)	215 lb (98 kg)	So	Fredericksburg, Virginia

Head coach

- John MacLeod

Assistant coach(es)

Legend

- (C) Team captain
- (S) Suspended
- (I) Ineligible
- (W) Walk-on
- Injured
- Current redshirt

== Schedule ==
Date time, TV	Rank^{#}	Opponent^{#}	Result	Record	Site city, state
November 26		Butler	L 60–67	0–1	Joyce Center; Notre Dame, IN
December 3		at No. 9 Indiana	L 46–78	0–2	Assembly Hall; Bloomington, Indiana
December 5		Louisville	L 81–84	0–3	Joyce Center; Notre Dame, IN
December 9		at Valparaiso	W 71–66	1–3	Athletics-Recreation Center; Valparaiso, IN
December 11		at Boston College	L 58–78	1–4	Silvio O. Conte Forum; Boston, Massachusetts
January 2		at No. 17 Kentucky	L 70–91	1–5	Rupp Arena; Lexington, Kentucky
January 6		at No. 23 USC	W 64–58	2–5	L.A. Sports Arena; Los Angeles, CA
January 9		at La Salle	W 87–79	3–5	Convention Hall; Philadelphia, Pennsylvania
January 11		vs. No. 8 North Carolina	W 88–76	4–5	Madison Square Garden; New York, NY
January 13		at West Virginia	L 67–87	4–6	WVU Coliseum; Morgantown, WV
January 18		at Virginia	L 56–83	4–7	University Hall; Charlottesville, Virginia
January 21		at Marquette	W 69–63	5–7	Bradley Center; Milwaukee, WI
January 23		No. 12 Missouri	L 68–77	5–8	Joyce Center; Notre Dame, IN
January 27		Dayton	W 76–54	6–8	Joyce Center; Notre Dame, IN
January 29		DePaul	W 74–69	7–8	Joyce Center; Notre Dame, IN
February 1		at No. 1 Duke	L 71–100	7–9	Cameron Indoor Stadium; Durham, NC
February 4		Detroit	L 70–72	7–10	Joyce Center; Notre Dame, IN
February 9		No. 15 Michigan	L 65–74	7–11	Joyce Center; Notre Dame, IN
February 11		Stanford	W 64–63	8–11	Joyce Center; Notre Dame, IN
February 15		at No. 10 Syracuse	W 101–98	9–11	Carrier Dome; Syracuse, NY
February 18		Marquette	W 60–53	10–11	Joyce Center; Notre Dame, IN
February 22		No. 2 UCLA	W 84–71	11–11	Joyce Center; Notre Dame, IN
February 25		at Dayton	L 58–60	11–12	University of Dayton Arena; Dayton, Ohio
February 27		Loyola (IL)	W 75–72	12–12	Joyce Center; Notre Dame, IN
February 29		No. 20 St. John’s (NY)	W 79–70	13–12	Joyce Center; Notre Dame, IN
March 3		Xavier	W 87–86	14–12	Joyce Center; Notre Dame, IN
March 7		at No. 15 DePaul	L 65–66	14–13	Rosemont Horizon; Rosemont, IL
March 9		at Evansville	L 56–74	14–14	Roberts Municipal Stadium; Evansville, IN
NIT
March 18		Western Michigan; First Round	W 63–56	15–14	Joyce Center; Notre Dame, IN
March 23		Kansas State; Second Round	W 64–47	16–14	Joyce Center; Notre Dame, IN
March 25		Manhattan; Quarterfinal	W 74–58	17–14	Joyce Center; Notre Dame, IN
March 30		vs. Utah; Semifinals	W 58–55	18–14	Madison Square Garden; New York, NY
April 1		vs. Virginia; Finals	L 76–81 ^{OT}	18–15	Madison Square Garden; New York, NY
*Non-conference game. ^{#}Rankings from AP Poll. (#) Tournament seedings in parentheses.
