= 1991–92 DePaul Blue Demons men's basketball team =

American college basketball season

1991–92 DePaul Blue Demons men's basketball
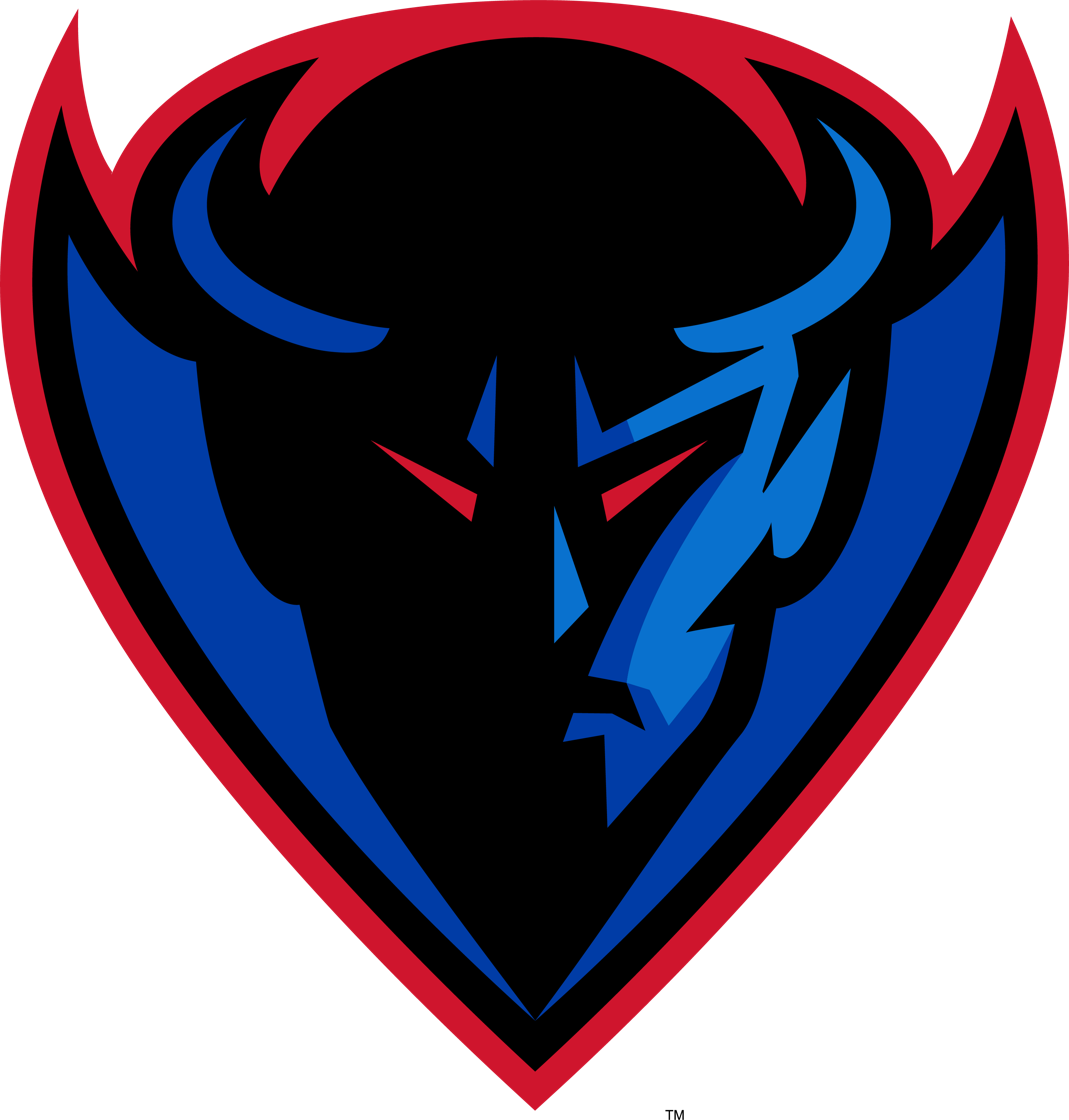

Great Midwest Co-Champions

NCAA tournament, first round
- Conference: Great Midwest Conference

Ranking
- Coaches: No. 22
- AP: No. 24
- Record: 20–9 (8–2 Great Midwest)
- Head coach: Joey Meyer (8th season)
- Assistant coaches: Ken Burmeister (2nd season); Robert Collins; Jay Goedert; Rich Kolimas
- Home arena: Rosemont Horizon

1991–92 Great Midwest Conference men's basketball standings
	Conf.				Overall
Team	W		L	PCT	W		L	PCT
No. 12 Cincinnati †	8	–	2	.800	29	–	5	.853
No. 24 DePaul	8	–	2	.800	20	–	9	.690
Marquette	5	–	5	.500	16	–	13	.552
Memphis State	5	–	5	.500	23	–	11	.676
UAB	4	–	6	.400	20	–	9	.690
Saint Louis	0	–	10	.000	5	–	23	.179
† 1992 GMC tournament winner Rankings from AP Poll

The 1991–92 DePaul Blue Demons men's basketball team represented DePaul University as a member of the newly formed Great Midwest Conference during the 1991–92 NCAA Division I men's basketball season. They were led by head coach Joey Meyer, in his 8th season, and played their home games at the Rosemont Horizon in Rosemont.

== Roster ==
1991–92 DePaul Blue Demons men's basketball team
Players
Coaches

Pos.	#	Name	Height	Weight	Year	Previous school	Hometown
G	11	Joe Daughrity	6 ft 0 in (1.83 m)	165 lb (75 kg)	Sr	Crane	Chicago, IL
G	13	Brandon Cole	6 ft 0 in (1.83 m)	155 lb (70 kg)	So	Bloom	Chicago Heights, IL
SF	21	Stephen Howard	6 ft 9 in (2.06 m)	220 lb (100 kg)	Sr	Bishop Lynch HS	Dallas, TX
G	22	Brad Niemann	6 ft 3 in (1.91 m)	180 lb (82 kg)	RS Sr	Glenbrook South	Glenview, IL
F	23	Curtis Price	6 ft 6 in (1.98 m)	200 lb (91 kg)	RS Jr	St. Rita	Chicago, IL
G	25	Terry Davis	6 ft 4 in (1.93 m)	195 lb (88 kg)	Jr	Tri-Cities	College Park, GA
F/C	30	David Booth	6 ft 7 in (2.01 m)	205 lb (93 kg)	Sr	Manual HS	Peoria, IL
G	32	Howard Nathan	5 ft 11 in (1.8 m)	175 lb (79 kg)	Fr	Manual HS	Peoria, IL
G	34	Tom Kleinschmidt	6 ft 5 in (1.96 m)	210 lb (95 kg)	Fr	Gordon Tech	Chicago, IL
C	42	Jeff Stern	6 ft 11 in (2.11 m)	230 lb (104 kg)	Sr	Waxahachie	Waxahachie, TX
C	55	Michael Ravizee	6 ft 9 in (2.06 m)	250 lb (113 kg)	So	Woodlawn	Birmingham, AL

Head coach

- Joey Meyer

Assistant coach(es)

- Ken Burmeister (St. Mary's (TX))
- Robert Collins
- Jay Goedert
- Rich Kolimas

Legend

- (C) Team captain
- (S) Suspended
- (I) Ineligible
- (W) Walk-on
- Injured
- Current redshirt

Roster

== Schedule and results ==
Date time, TV	Rank^{#}	Opponent^{#}	Result	Record	Site city, state
Regular season
Nov 29, 1991	No. 20	at Memphis State	W 92–89	1–0 (1–0)	Pyramid Arena (20,142); Memphis, Tennessee
Dec 4, 1991*	No. 20	Northeastern Illinois	W 100–77	2–0	Alumni Hall (3,612); Chicago, Illinois
Dec 6, 1991*	No. 20	at UNC Charlotte	L 63–68	2–1	Charlotte Coliseum (12,416); Charlotte, North Carolina
Dec 7, 1991*	No. 20	vs. NC State	L 83–97	2–2	Charlotte Coliseum (13,045); Charlotte, North Carolina
Dec 11, 1991*		American	W 106–80	3–2	Alumni Hall (3,483); Chicago, Illinois
Mar 4, 1992	No. 15	Marquette	L 65–73	19–7 (8–2)	Rosemont Horizon (9,102); Rosemont, Illinois
Mar 7, 1992*	No. 15	Notre Dame	W 66–65	20–7	Rosemont Horizon (17,623); Rosemont, Illinois
Great Midwest tournament
Mar 13, 1992*	No. 19	vs. Memphis State; Semifinals	L 75–95	20–8	Chicago Stadium (8,717); Chicago, Illinois
NCAA Tournament
Mar 20, 1992*	(5 W) No. 24	vs. (12 W) New Mexico State; First Round	L 73–81	20–9	ASU Activity Center (7,639); Tempe, Arizona
*Non-conference game. ^{#}Rankings from AP Poll. (#) Tournament seedings in parentheses. W=West. All times are in Central Time.
