= 1992 MEAC men's basketball tournament =

- Classification: Division I
- Season: 1991–92
- Teams: 9
- Site: Campus sites
- Finals site: Norfolk Scope; Norfolk, Virginia
- Champions: Howard (3rd title)
- Winning coach: Butch Beard (1st title)
- MVP: Howard Holley (Howard)

1991–92 MEAC men's basketball standings
	Conf.				Overall
Team	W		L	PCT	W		L	PCT
North Carolina A&T	12	–	4	.750	18	–	9	.667
Howard †	12	–	4	.750	17	–	14	.548
Florida A&M	11	–	5	.688	16	–	14	.533
Coppin State	9	–	7	.563	15	–	13	.536
South Carolina State	9	–	7	.563	14	–	15	.483
Delaware State	9	–	7	.563	12	–	16	.429
Morgan State	5	–	11	.313	6	–	23	.207
Bethune–Cookman	3	–	13	.188	4	–	25	.138
Maryland Eastern Shore	2	–	14	.125	3	–	25	.107
† 1992 MEAC tournament winner Rankings from AP Poll

The 1992 Mid-Eastern Athletic Conference men's basketball tournament took place March 4–7, 1992, at Norfolk Scope in Norfolk, Virginia. Top seed Howard defeated three seed Florida A&M, 67–65 in the championship game, to win its third MEAC Tournament title.

The Bison participated in the 1992 NCAA tournament as No. 16 seed in the Midwest Region.

== Format ==
All nine conference members participated, with play beginning in the first round. The top seven teams received byes to the quarterfinal round. Teams were seeded based on their regular season conference record.

== Bracket ==
First round March 4
8	Bethune–Cookman	90
9	Maryland Eastern Shore	70

Quarterfinals; March 5
1	Howard	58
8	Bethune–Cookman	54
4	Coppin State	91
5	South Carolina State	98
3	Florida A&M	78
6	Delaware State	73
2	North Carolina A&T	70
7	Morgan State	75

Semifinals; March 6
1	Howard	76
5	South Carolina State	73
3	Florida A&M	74
7	Morgan State	69

Final; March 7
1	Howard	67
3	Florida A&M	65
