= 1991–92 Wisconsin Badgers men's basketball team =

American college basketball season

1991–92 Wisconsin Badgers men's basketball
- Conference: Big Ten Conference
- Record: 13–18 (4–14 Big Ten)
- Head coach: Steve Yoder
- Home arena: UW Fieldhouse

1991–92 Big Ten Conference men's basketball standings
	Conf.				Overall
Team	W		L	PCT	W		L	PCT
No. 3 Ohio State	15	–	3	.833	26	–	6	.813
No. 5 Indiana	14	–	4	.778	27	–	7	.794
No. 15 Michigan	11	–	7	.611	24	–	9	.727
No. 14 Michigan State	11	–	7	.611	22	–	8	.733
Iowa	10	–	8	.556	19	–	11	.633
Purdue	8	–	10	.444	18	–	15	.545
Minnesota	8	–	10	.444	16	–	16	.500
Illinois	7	–	11	.389	13	–	15	.464
Wisconsin	4	–	14	.222	13	–	18	.419
Northwestern	2	–	16	.111	9	–	19	.321
Rankings from AP Poll

The 1991–92 Wisconsin Badgers men's basketball team represented the University of Wisconsin–Madison. The head coach was Steve Yoder, coaching his 10th and final season with the Badgers. The team played their home games at the UW Fieldhouse in Madison, Wisconsin, and was a member of the Big Ten Conference.

== Roster ==
1991–92 Wisconsin Badgers men's basketball team
Players
Coaches

Pos.	#	Name	Height	Weight	Year	Hometown
G	3	Jason Johnsen	6 ft 3 in (1.91 m)	190 lb (86 kg)	RS So	New Hope, MN
F	4	Brian Kelley	6 ft 7 in (2.01 m)	240 lb (109 kg)	Fr	Decatur, GA
G	10	Billy Douglass	6 ft 5 in (1.96 m)	198 lb (90 kg)	RS Sr	Lake Forest, Illinois
G	11	Tracy Webster	6 ft 0 in (1.83 m)	185 lb (84 kg)	So	Harvey, IL
G	12	Brian Good	6 ft 1 in (1.85 m)	180 lb (82 kg)	Sr	Rossville, Indiana
G	15	Andy Kilbride	6 ft 3 in (1.91 m)	185 lb (84 kg)	Fr	Kankakee, IL
G	21	Jay Peters	6 ft 2 in (1.88 m)	187 lb (85 kg)	RS Sr	Janesville, Wisconsin
F	24	Michael Finley	6 ft 6 in (1.98 m)	205 lb (93 kg)	Fr	Maywood, IL
F	32	Carlton McGee	6 ft 7 in (2.01 m)	202 lb (92 kg)	RS So	Milwaukee, Wisconsin
F	33	Louis Ely	6 ft 7 in (2.01 m)	192 lb (87 kg)	Jr	Harvey, Illinois
F	34	Howard Moore	6 ft 6 in (1.98 m)	200 lb (91 kg)	Fr	Chicago, IL
F	41	Damon Harrell	6 ft 9 in (2.06 m)	215 lb (98 kg)	Jr	Madison, Wisconsin
F/C	43	Jeff Petersen	6 ft 10 in (2.08 m)	225 lb (102 kg)	So	Mequon, WI
C	52	Grant Johnson	7 ft 0 in (2.13 m)	236 lb (107 kg)	RS So	Plymouth, Minnesota
G/F		Schell Jay	6 ft 6 in (1.98 m)	180 lb (82 kg)	Sr	Stevens Point, Wisconsin

Head coach

- Steve Yoder

Assistant coach(es)

Legend

- (C) Team captain
- (S) Suspended
- (I) Ineligible
- (W) Walk-on
- Injured
- Current redshirt

== Schedule ==
Date time, TV	Rank^{#}	Opponent^{#}	Result	Record	Site city, state
Regular Season
11/23/1991*		Loyola (IL)	W 89–67	1–0	UW Fieldhouse; Madison, WI
11/25/1991*		SE Missouri State	W 82–71 ^{OT}	2–0	UW Fieldhouse; Madison, WI
11/30/1991*		at Portland	W 96–87	3–0	Chiles Center; Portland, OR
12/3/1991*		SMU	L 64–66	3–1	UW Fieldhouse; Madison, WI
12/5/1991*		Central Connecticut State	W 80–54	4–1	UW Fieldhouse; Madison, WI
12/7/1991*		Coastal Carolina	W 91–57	5–1	UW Fieldhouse; Madison, WI
12/11/1991*		at Nebraska	L 67–86	5–2	Bob Devaney Sports Center; Lincoln, NE
12/13/1991*		Sam Houston State	W 98–75	6–2	UW Fieldhouse; Madison, WI
12/21/1991*		Howard	W 64–57	7–2	UW Fieldhouse; Madison, WI
12/27/1991*		vs. Washington State; Rainbow Classic	L 51–73	7–3	Neal S. Blaisdell Center; Honolulu, HI
12/29/1991*		vs. Navy; Rainbow Classic	W 93–58	8–3	Neal S. Blaisdell Center; Honolulu, HI
12/30/1991*		vs. Fresno State; Rainbow Classic	L 68–71	8–4	Neal S. Blaisdell Center; Honolulu, HI
1/4/1992*		Marquette	W 81–63	9–4	UW Fieldhouse; Madison, WI
1/8/1992		Northwestern	W 69–67	10–4 (1–0)	UW Fieldhouse; Madison, WI
1/11/1992		No. 10 Indiana	L 63–79	10–5 (1–1)	UW Fieldhouse; Madison, WI
1/15/1992		Minnesota	L 48–49	10–6 (1–2)	UW Fieldhouse; Madison, WI
1/22/1992		at Illinois	L 67–74	10–7 (1–3)	Assembly Hall; Champaign, IL
1/25/1992		at No. 16 Michigan	L 83–98	10–8 (1–4)	Crisler Arena; Ann Arbor, MI
1/29/1992		at Iowa	L 66–73	10–9 (1–5)	Carver–Hawkeye Arena; Iowa City, IA
2/2/1992		Purdue	W 79–69	11–9 (2–5)	UW Fieldhouse; Madison, WI
2/5/1992		at No. 8 Ohio State	L 72–86	11–10 (2–6)	St. John Arena; Columbus, OH
2/8/1992		No. 11 Michigan State	L 64–79	11–11 (2–7)	UW Fieldhouse; Madison, WI
2/12/1992		at No. 12 Michigan State	L 61–76	11–12 (2–8)	Breslin Center; East Lansing, MI
2/15/1992		No. 8 Ohio State	L 63–67	11–13 (2–9)	UW Fieldhouse; Madison, WI
2/20/1992		Illinois	W 92–78	12–13 (3–9)	UW Fieldhouse; Madison, WI
2/26/1992		No. 17 Michigan	W 96–78	13–13 (4–9)	UW Fieldhouse; Madison, WI
2/29/1992		at Purdue	L 51–61	13–14 (4–10)	Mackey Arena; West Lafayette, IN
3/4/1992		at Minnesota	L 57–76	13–15 (4–11)	Williams Arena; Minneapolis, MN
3/7/1992		Iowa	L 65–70	13–16 (4–12)	UW Fieldhouse; Madison, WI
3/12/1992		at No. 4 Indiana	L 41–66	13–17 (4–13)	Assembly Hall; Bloomington, IN
3/14/1992		at Northwestern	L 65–76	13–18 (4–14)	Welsh–Ryan Arena; Evanston, IL
*Non-conference game. ^{#}Rankings from AP Poll. (#) Tournament seedings in parentheses.
