= 1991–92 Cincinnati Bearcats men's basketball team =

American college basketball season

1991–92 Cincinnati Bearcats men's basketball

Great Midwest regular season co–champions

Great Midwest Tournament champions

NCAA men's Division I tournament, Final Four
- Conference: Great Midwest Conference

Ranking
- Coaches: No. 11
- AP: No. 12
- Record: 29–5 (8–2 Great Midwest)
- Head coach: Bob Huggins (3rd season)
- Assistant coaches: Larry Harrison; Steve Moeller; John Loyer
- Home arena: Myrl Shoemaker Center

1991–92 Great Midwest Conference men's basketball standings
	Conf.				Overall
Team	W		L	PCT	W		L	PCT
No. 12 Cincinnati †	8	–	2	.800	29	–	5	.853
No. 24 DePaul	8	–	2	.800	20	–	9	.690
Marquette	5	–	5	.500	16	–	13	.552
Memphis State	5	–	5	.500	23	–	11	.676
UAB	4	–	6	.400	20	–	9	.690
Saint Louis	0	–	10	.000	5	–	23	.179
† 1992 GMC tournament winner Rankings from AP Poll

The 1991–92 Cincinnati Bearcats men's basketball team represented the University of Cincinnati in NCAA Division I competition in the 1991–92 season. The Bearcats, coached by Bob Huggins, won the first title of the Great Midwest Conference, created that season by a split from the Metro Conference (the two would reunite in 1995 to form Conference USA).

== Roster ==
1991–92 Cincinnati Bearcats men's basketball team
Players
Coaches

Pos.	#	Name	Height	Weight	Year	Hometown
C	44	Corie Blount	6 ft 10 in (2.08 m)	220 lb (100 kg)	Jr	Monrovia, California
G	23	Anthony Buford	6 ft 3 in (1.91 m)	196 lb (89 kg)	Sr	Flint, Michigan
G	10	Tarrance Gibson	6 ft 2 in (1.88 m)	166 lb (75 kg)	Jr	Dothan, Alabama
G	52	Allen Jackson	6 ft 1 in (1.85 m)	171 lb (78 kg)	Jr	South Bend, Indiana
G/F	34	Herb Jones	6 ft 4 in (1.93 m)	211 lb (96 kg)	Sr	Atlanta, Georgia
F	3	Erik Martin	6 ft 5 in (1.96 m)	220 lb (100 kg)	Jr	Covina, California
F	33	Terry Nelson	6 ft 5 in (1.96 m)	213 lb (97 kg)	Jr	Long Beach, California
C	41	Mike Reicheneker	7 ft 0 in (2.13 m)	254 lb (115 kg)	Sr	Arlington, Texas
F/C	50	Jeff Scott	6 ft 10 in (2.08 m)	223 lb (101 kg)	Sr	Cincinnati, Ohio
G	31	Nick Van Exel	6 ft 1 in (1.85 m)	171 lb (78 kg)	Jr	Kenosha, Wisconsin
F	32	B. J. Ward	6 ft 5 in (1.96 m)	187 lb (85 kg)	Sr	Cincinnati, Ohio
F	55	John Jacobs (redshirt)	6 ft 7 in (2.01 m)	255 lb (116 kg)	Fr	Cincinnati, Ohio
F	43	Curtis Bostic (redshirt)	6 ft 5 in (1.96 m)	215 lb (98 kg)	So	Brockton, Massachusetts

Head coach

- Bob Huggins (West Virginia)

Assistant coach(es)

- Larry Harrison (Pittsburgh)
- Steve Moeller (Otterbein)
- John Loyer (Akron)
- Chuck Machock (Cincinnati)

Legend

- (C) Team captain
- (S) Suspended
- (I) Ineligible
- (W) Walk-on
- Injured
- Current redshirt

== Schedule ==
Date time, TV	Rank^{#}	Opponent^{#}	Result	Record	Site city, state
Non-conference regular season
November 22*		Austin Peay	W 108–77	1–0	Myrl Shoemaker Center; Cincinnati, OH
November 23*		American	W 72–69	2–0	Myrl Shoemaker Center; Cincinnati, OH
November 25*		Fairleigh Dickinson	W 75–58	3–0	Myrl Shoemaker Center; Cincinnati, OH
November 30*		Miami (OH)	W 82–62	4–0	Myrl Shoemaker Center; Cincinnati, OH
December 3*		Cleveland State	W 91–56	5–0	Myrl Shoemaker Center; Cincinnati, OH
December 6*		East Carolina	W 105–69	6–0	Myrl Shoemaker Center; Cincinnati, OH
December 16*		at UMKC	W 91–56	7–0	Municipal Auditorium; Kansas City, MO
December 21*		at No. 12 Michigan State	L 89–90	7–1	Breslin Student Events Center; East Lansing, MI
December 31*		South Florida	W 80–60	8–1	Myrl Shoemaker Center; Cincinnati, OH
January 4*		No. 10 Indiana	L 60–81	8–2	Myrl Shoemaker Center; Cincinnati, OH
January 6*		Middle Tennessee State	W 79–70	9–2	Myrl Shoemaker Center; Cincinnati, OH
January 8*		at Tennessee	W 62–51	10–2	Thompson–Boling Arena; Knoxville, TN
January 11		St. Louis	W 79–66	11–2 (1–0)	Myrl Shoemaker Center; Cincinnati, OH
January 15		at DePaul	L 66–75	11–3 (1–1)	Rosemont Horizon; Chicago, IL
January 18		Memphis State	W 75–66	12–3 (2–1)	Myrl Shoemaker Center; Cincinnati, OH
January 22*		Eastern Kentucky	W 81–41	13–3	Myrl Shoemaker Center; Cincinnati, OH
January 25		UAB	W 76–52	14–3 (3–1)	Myrl Shoemaker Center; Cincinnati, OH
January 6*		at Xavier; Skyline Chili Crosstown Shootout	W 93–75	15–3	Cincinnati Gardens; Cincinnati, OH
February 1		at Marquette	W 71–57	16–3 (4–1)	Bradley Center; Milwaukee, WI
February 5*		Dayton	W 77–48	17–3	Myrl Shoemaker Center; Cincinnati, OH
February 12*	No. 24	Brooklyn	W 104–54	18–3	Myrl Shoemaker Center; Cincinnati, OH
February 15	No. 24	at St. Louis	W 89–60	19–3 (5–1)	St. Louis Arena; St. Louis, MO
February 20	No. 19	DePaul	L 69–71	19–4 (5–2)	Myrl Shoemaker Center; Cincinnati, OH
February 22*	No. 19	at South Alabama	W 104–78	20–4	Jag Gym; Mobile, AL
February 22	No. 19	Marquette	W 70–59	21–4 (6–2)	Myrl Shoemaker Center; Cincinnati, OH
February 29	No. 19	at UAB	W 63–58	22–4 (7–2)	Bartow Arena; Birmingham, AL
March 7	No. 14	at Memphis State	W 69–59	23–4 (8–2)	Pyramid Arena; Memphis, Tennessee
Great Midwest Tournament
March 13	(1) No. 12	vs. (4) Marquette; Semifinals	W 62–49	24–4	Chicago Stadium; Chicago, IL
March 14	(1) No. 12	vs. (3) Memphis State; Championship	W 75–63	25–4	Chicago Stadium; Chicago, IL
NCAA Tournament
March 20*	(4 MW) No. 12	vs. (13 MW) Delaware; Round of 64	W 85-47	26-4	University of Dayton Arena; Dayton, OH
March 22*	(4 MW) No. 12	vs. (5 MW) No. 14 Michigan State; Round of 32	W 77-65	27-4	University of Dayton Arena; Dayton, OH
March 27*	(4 MW) No. 12	vs. (9 MW) UTEP; Sweet Sixteen	W 69-67	28-4	Kemper Arena; Kansas City, MO
March 29	(4 MW) No. 12	vs. (6 MW) Memphis State; Elite Eight	W 88-57	29-4	Kemper Arena; Kansas City, MO
April 4*	(4 MW) No. 12	vs. (6 SE) No. 15 Michigan; Final Four	L 72-76	29-5	Hubert H. Humphrey Metrodome; Minneapolis, MN
*Non-conference game. ^{#}Rankings from AP poll. (#) Tournament seedings in parentheses.

== Rankings ==
Ranking movements Legend: ██ Increase in ranking ██ Decrease in ranking
	Week																			
Poll	Pre	1	2	3	4	5	6	7	8	9	10	11	12	13	14	15	16	17	18	Final
AP														24	19	19	14	12	12	Not released
Coaches														25	20	18	15	12	11	
