= 1991–92 Michigan Wolverines men's basketball team =

American college basketball season

1991–92 Michigan Wolverines men's basketball

NCAA tournament, Runner-up (vacated)

National Championship Game, L 51–71 vs. Duke (vacated)
- Conference: Big Ten Conference

Ranking
- Coaches: No. 16
- AP: No. 15
- Record: 24–8 (25–9 unadjusted) (11–7 Big Ten)
- Head coach: Steve Fisher
- Assistant coaches: Brian Dutcher; Jay Smith; Perry Watson
- MVP: Jalen Rose
- Captain: Freddie Hunter
- Home arena: Crisler Arena

1991–92 Big Ten Conference men's basketball standings
	Conf.				Overall
Team	W		L	PCT	W		L	PCT
No. 3 Ohio State	15	–	3	.833	26	–	6	.813
No. 5 Indiana	14	–	4	.778	27	–	7	.794
No. 15 Michigan	11	–	7	.611	24	–	9	.727
No. 14 Michigan State	11	–	7	.611	22	–	8	.733
Iowa	10	–	8	.556	19	–	11	.633
Purdue	8	–	10	.444	18	–	15	.545
Minnesota	8	–	10	.444	16	–	16	.500
Illinois	7	–	11	.389	13	–	15	.464
Wisconsin	4	–	14	.222	13	–	18	.419
Northwestern	2	–	16	.111	9	–	19	.321
Rankings from AP Poll

The 1991–92 Michigan Wolverines men's basketball team represented the University of Michigan in intercollegiate college basketball during the 1991–92 season. The team played its home games in the Crisler Arena in Ann Arbor, Michigan, and was a member of the Big Ten Conference.

Under the direction of head coach Steve Fisher, the team finished tied for third in the Big Ten Conference. The team earned an invitation to the 1992 NCAA Division I men's basketball tournament where it was national runner up. Although the team compiled a 25–9 record during the season, the NCAA has adjusted the team's record to 24–8 due to sanctions revolving around the eligibility of Chris Webber resulting from the University of Michigan basketball scandal. The team was ranked for the entire eighteen weeks of Associated Press Top Twenty-Five Poll, starting the season ranked twentieth, rising as high as number eleven and ending ranked fifteenth, and it ended the season ranked seventeenth in the final USA Today/CNN Poll. The team had a 6–6 record against ranked opponents, including the following victories: January 9, 1992, against the number sixteen ranked Iowa Hawkeyes 80–77 (overtime) at Carver–Hawkeye Arena in Iowa City, Iowa, January 29 against the number thirteen ranked Michigan State Spartans 89–79 (overtime) at the Breslin Student Events Center in East Lansing, Michigan, March 8 against the number two ranked Indiana Hoosiers 68–60 at Crisler Arena, March 27 the number eleven ranked Oklahoma State Cowboys 75–72 in the 1992 NCAA Division I men's basketball tournament at Rupp Arena, March 29 the number three ranked and archrival Ohio State Buckeyes 75–71 at Rupp Arena in Lexington, Kentucky, and April 4 against the number twelve ranked Cincinnati Bearcats 76–72 at the Hubert H. Humphrey Metrodome in Minneapolis.

The team had rotating captains on a game-by-game basis, and Chris Webber earned team MVP. The team's leading scorers were Jalen Rose (597 points), Chris Webber (528 points), and Juwan Howard (377 points). The leading rebounders were Webber (340), Howard (212), and Rose (146).

During the season, the team won the Big Ten Conference statistical championships in rebounding and rebounding margin with at 38.2 average and 5.8 average margin in conference games, respectively. Chris Webber became the first freshman to lead the Big Ten in rebounds with a 9.8 average in 18 conference games and 10.0 average in 34 overall games. However, his 340 rebounds in 34 games fell short of Phil Hubbard's school freshman single-season record of 352 rebounds set as a member of the 1975–76 team that still stands as the school record as of 2010.

Jalen Rose set the current school record for points scored by a freshman 597. Rose also set the school single-season record for minutes played with 1132 minutes. The following season, four players surpassed this total.

The team set the school record for single-season team blocks with 182 in 34 games, surpassing the 1986 teams total of 146 in 33 games. The following season the team would rebreak the record.

The Wolverines 25–9 record was an improvement on the previous year's record of 14–15. Due to the success of the Fab Five, athletic royalties increased from 2 million dollars in 1990 ($4.9 million today) to 4.4 million dollars ($10.1 million) in 1992.

The team, coached by Steve Fisher, is best remembered for the entry of a talented freshman class, known as the Fab Five, that would become the starting lineup:

- Center: Juwan Howard
- Power forward: Chris Webber
- Small forward: Ray Jackson
- Shooting guard: Jimmy King
- Point guard: Jalen Rose

Reserve point guard Rob Pelinka would go on to greater fame as an agent for numerous NBA stars, most notably Kobe Bryant, and as General Manager for the Los Angeles Lakers.

Although the Wolverines would make the NCAA title game that season, losing to defending national champion Duke, they vacated their Final Four appearance in the wake of a major scandal which resulted in Webber being ruled ineligible due to him receiving improper payments from a major booster.

== Schedule ==
Date time, TV	Rank^{#}	Opponent^{#}	Result	Record	Site city, state
Non-conference regular season
December 2*	No. 25	at Detroit	W 100–74	1–0	Cobo Arena; Detroit
December 7*	No. 25	at Cleveland State	W 80–61	2–0	Wolstein Center; Cleveland
December 9*	No. 18	Chicago State	W 112–62	3–0	Crisler Arena; Ann Arbor, Michigan
December 12*	No. 18	Eastern Michigan	W 91–77	4–0	Crisler Arena; Ann Arbor, Michigan
December 14*; 3:45 p.m.	No. 18	No. 1 Duke; Duke–Michigan rivalry	L 85–88 ^{OT}	4–1	Crisler Arena; Ann Arbor, Michigan
December 16*	No. 15	Central Michigan	W 86–70	5–1	Crisler Arena; Ann Arbor, Michigan
December 21*	No. 15	Rice	W 87–70	6–1	Crisler Arena; Ann Arbor, Michigan
December 28*	No. 11	vs. BYU; Red Lobster Classic	W 86–83	7–1	Orlando Arena; Orlando, Florida
December 30*	No. 11	vs. Virginia Tech; Red Lobster Classic	W 63–51	8–1	Orlando Arena; Orlando, Florida
Big Ten Conference regular season
January 9	No. 11	at No. 16 Iowa	W 80–77 ^{OT}	9–1 (1–0)	Carver-Hawkeye Arena (15,500); Iowa City, Iowa
January 11	No. 11	at Minnesota	L 64–73	9–2 (1–1)	Minneapolis
January 15	No. 15	Purdue	L 60–65	9–3 (1–2)	Crisler Arena; Ann Arbor, Michigan
January 18	No. 15	at Illinois	W 68–61	10–3 (2–2)	Assembly Hall (15,985); Champaign, Illinois
January 21	No. 16	at No. 4 Indiana	L 74–89	10–4 (2–3)	Assembly Hall; Bloomington, Indiana
January 25	No. 16	Wisconsin	W 98–83	11–4 (3–3)	Crisler Arena; Ann Arbor, Michigan
January 29	No. 15	at No. 13 Michigan State; Michigan–Michigan State rivalry	W 89–79 ^{OT}	12–4 (4–3)	Breslin Center; East Lansing, Michigan
February 2	No. 15	No. 10 Ohio State; Michigan–Ohio State rivalry	L 58–68	12–5 (4–4)	Crisler Arena; Ann Arbor, Michigan
February 5	No. 15	Northwestern	W 81–58	13–5 (5–4)	Crisler Arena; Ann Arbor, Michigan
February 9*	No. 15	at Notre Dame	W 74–65	14–5	Edmund P. Joyce Center; South Bend, Indiana
February 12	No. 17	Iowa	W 79–74	15–5 (6–4)	Crisler Arena; Ann Arbor, Michigan
February 15	No. 17	No. 12 Michigan State; Michigan–Michigan State Rivalry	L 59–70	15–6 (6–5)	Crisler Arena; Ann Arbor, Michigan
February 19	No. 20	Minnesota	W 95–70	16–6 (7–5)	Crisler Arena; Ann Arbor, Michigan
February 22	No. 20	at Northwestern	W 76–63	17–6 (8–5)	Evanston, Illinois
February 26	No. 17	at Wisconsin	L 78–96	17–7 (8–6)	Madison, Wisconsin
March 3	No. 18	at No. 5 Ohio State; Michigan–Ohio State rivalry	L 66–77	17–8 (8–7)	St. John Arena; Columbus, Ohio
March 8	No. 18	No. 2 Indiana	W 68–60	18–8 (9–7)	Crisler Arena; Ann Arbor, Michigan
March 11	No. 14	at Purdue	W 70–61	19–8 (10–7)	Mackey Arena; West Lafayette, Indiana
March 14	No. 14	Illinois	W 68–59	20–8 (11–7)	Crisler Arena (13,605); Ann Arbor, Michigan
NCAA tournament
March 20*	(6 SE) No. 15	vs. (11 SE) Temple; NCAA tournament • First round	W 73–66	21–8	The Omni; Atlanta
March 22*	(6 SE) No. 15	vs. (14 SE) East Tennessee State; NCAA Tournament • Second Round	W 102–90	22–8	The Omni; Atlanta
March 27*	(6 SE) No. 15	vs. (2 SE) No. 11 Oklahoma State; NCAA Tournament • Regional semifinals	W 75–72	23–8	Rupp Arena; Lexington, Kentucky
March 29*	(6 SE) No. 15	vs. (1 SE) No. 3 Ohio State; NCAA Tournament • Regional Final; Michigan–Ohio State rivalry	W 75–71 ^{OT}	24–8	Rupp Arena; Lexington, Kentucky
April 4* CBS	(6 SE) No. 15	vs. (4 MW) No. 12 Cincinnati; NCAA Tournament • National semifinals	W 76–72	25–8	Hubert H. Humphrey Metrodome; Minneapolis
April 6* CBS	(6 SE) No. 15	vs. (1 E) No. 1 Duke; NCAA Tournament • National Championship; Duke–Michigan rivalry	L 51–71	25–9	Hubert H. Humphrey Metrodome; Minneapolis
*Non-conference game. ^{#}Rankings from AP Poll. (#) Tournament seedings in parentheses.

== Regular season ==
As Michigan celebrated Midnight Madness on October 15, 1991, there was already talk that at least four of the five freshmen would be starting before the season ended. (The five eventually started in a combined 304 of a possible 350 man-games among them during their first two seasons.) In the Elite Eight round of the 1992 NCAA Men's Division I basketball tournament, Michigan earned a rematch against a Jimmy Jackson-led Ohio State Buckeyes team that had beaten them twice during the regular season by double digits. Michigan won the rematch, during which the Fab Five scored all but two Wolverines points. When the 24–8 Wolverines reached the Final Four round of the tournament, they found themselves matched against a 29–4 Bob Huggins-coached Cincinnati Bearcats team that averaged 83.6 points per game and had lost to only three teams, two of which had beaten Michigan. Nick Van Exel, who became the starter in the middle of the season, led Cincinnati in postseason scoring. Howard, King and Riley shaved their heads for the game. Michigan won and earned a rematch with the Duke Blue Devils team that had beaten them by three points in overtime in December. Duke scored in its final 12 possessions of the championship game, going on a 23–6 run to win by a final margin of 71–51.

== Statistics ==
The team posted the following statistics:

Name	GP	GS	Min	Avg	FG	FGA	FG%	3FG	3FGA	3FG%	FT	FTA	FT%	OR	DR	RB	Avg	Ast	Avg	PF	DQ	TO	Stl	Blk	Pts	Avg
Jalen Rose	34	33	1132	33.3	206	424	0.486	36	111	0.324	149	197	0.756	52	94	146	4.3	135	4.0	75	0	114	38	8	597	17.6
Chris Webber*	34	34	1090	32.1	229	412	0.556	14	54	0.259	56	113	0.496	128	212	340	10.0	76	2.2	99	5	95	54	84	528	15.5
Juwan Howard	34	31	956	28.1	150	333	0.450	0	2	0.000	77	112	0.688	66	146	212	6.2	62	1.8	107	3	99	14	21	377	11.1
Jimmy King	34	21	955	28.1	128	258	0.496	28	60	0.467	53	72	0.736	33	79	112	3.3	78	2.3	53	0	72	28	9	337	9.9
Eric Riley	32	3	497	15.5	82	139	0.590	0	0		37	64	0.578	54	85	139	4.3	21	0.7	84	4	50	7	19	201	6.3
Ray Jackson	34	15	592	17.4	66	121	0.545	2	10	0.200	21	46	0.457	47	56	103	3.0	58	1.7	79	3	52	24	11	155	4.6
Michael Talley	29	14	527	18.2	51	132	0.386	11	38	0.289	39	53	0.736	7	21	28	1.0	55	1.9	49	1	50	23	4	152	5.2
James Voskuil	31	14	453	14.6	50	104	0.481	16	46	0.348	21	36	0.583	17	44	61	2.0	32	1.0	64	2	29	12	10	137	4.4
Rob Pelinka	28	0	254	9.1	21	52	0.404	8	25	0.320	27	31	0.871	18	27	45	1.6	19	0.7	24	0	19	3	0	77	2.8
Freddie Hunter	29	5	278	9.6	9	17	0.529	0	0		7	12	0.583	25	32	57	2.0	21	0.7	37	0	14	12	7	25	0.9
Richmond McIver	11	0	66	6.0	6	9	0.667	0	0		8	20	0.400	4	13	17	1.6	2	0.2	11	0	7	1	5	20	1.8
Kirk Taylor	10	0	41	4.1	5	13	0.385	1	5	0.200	1	2	0.500	2	3	5	0.5	2	0.2	5	0	2	2	1	12	1.2
Samuel Mitchell	4	0	24	6.0	5	14	0.357	0	2	0.000	2	5	0.400	6	5	11	2.8	3	0.8	2	0	3	0	2	12	3.0
Jason Bossard	7	0	12	1.7	3	10	0.300	2	7	0.286	0	0		0	0	0	0.0	0	0.0	1	0	1	0	0	8	1.1
Christopher Seter	6	0	13	2.2	1	3	0.333	0	0		3	4	0.750	4	4	8	1.3	2	0.3	1	0	0	0	0	5	0.8
Chip Armer	6	0	10	1.7	2	3	0.667	0	0		0	2	0.000	0	0	0	0.0	0	0.0	2	0	1	0	1	4	0.7
TEAM	34													32	55	87	2.6					2				
Season Total	34				1014	2044	0.496	118	360	0.328	501	769	0.651	495	876	1371	40.3	566	16.6	693	18	610	218	182	2647	77.9
Opponents	34				846	2041	0.414	160	467	0.343	574	814	0.705	447	671	1118	32.9	455	13.4	707	21	529	225	57	2426	71.3

* Denotes players whose individual records, awards and other honors have been vacated due to NCAA and U-M sanctions

== Rankings ==
Ranking movements Legend: ██ Increase in ranking ██ Decrease in ranking
	Week																	
Poll	Pre	1	2	3	4	5	6	7	8	9	10	11	12	13	14	15	16	Final
AP Poll	20	23	25	18	15	11	11	11	15	16	15	15	17	20	17	18	14	15

== NCAA tournament ==
On March 20 as the number six seed in the first round of the southeast region of the 1992 NCAA Division I men's basketball tournament in Atlanta at the Omni Coliseum, the team defeated number eleven seed Temple 73–66. On March 22, the team defeated number fourteen seed East Tennessee State 102–90 in Atlanta. Then in the sweet sixteen, in Lexington, Kentucky, at Rupp Arena on March 27, the team defeated number two seeded Oklahoma State 75–72. On March 29 in the elite eight round in Lexington, the team defeated number one seed Ohio State 75–71 in overtime. In the national semifinal round of the final four on April 4 in Minneapolis at the Hubert H. Humphrey Metrodome, the team defeated number four seed Cincinnati 76–72. However, in the championship game at the Metrodome on April 6, the team lost to number one seed Duke 71–51.

The team established the NCAA record for fewest single-game three-point field goals made in a final four (1 vs. Duke on April 6, 1992), a record the team would surpass the following year. It also established the record for lowest single-game three-point field goal percentage with a 1-for-11 performance (9.1%) that stood until 2006. Although these final four records have been surpassed, both of these marks continue to stand as NCAA records for the championship game.

== Team players drafted into the NBA ==
Five players from this team were selected in the NBA draft.

Year	Round	Pick	Overall	Player	NBA Club
1993	1	1	1	Chris Webber	Orlando Magic
1993	2	6	33	Eric Riley	Dallas Mavericks
1994	1	5	5	Juwan Howard	Washington Bullets
1994	1	13	13	Jalen Rose	Denver Nuggets
1995	2	6	35	Jimmy King	Toronto Raptors

== See also ==
- List of vacated and forfeited games in college basketball
- University of Michigan basketball scandal
