= 1991–92 East Tennessee State Buccaneers men's basketball team =

American college basketball season

1991–92 East Tennessee State Buccaneers men's basketball
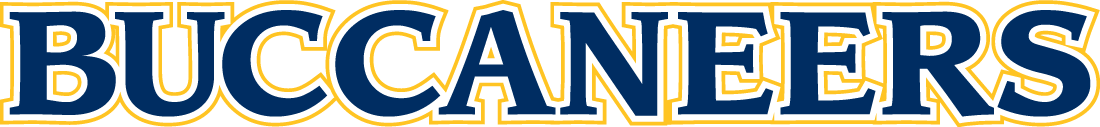

SoCon regular season champions and tournament champions

NCAA tournament, second round
- Conference: Southern Conference
- Record: 24–7 (12–2 SoCon)
- Head coach: Alan LeForce (2nd season)
- Home arena: ETSU/Mountain States Health; Alliance Athletic Center

1991–92 Southern Conference men's basketball standings
	Conf.				Overall
Team	W		L	PCT	W		L	PCT
East Tennessee State †	12	–	2	.857	24	–	7	.774
Chattanooga	12	–	2	.857	23	–	7	.767
Furman	9	–	5	.643	17	–	11	.607
Appalachian State	9	–	5	.643	15	–	14	.517
Western Carolina	5	–	9	.357	11	–	17	.393
Marshall	3	–	11	.214	7	–	22	.241
VMI	3	–	11	.214	10	–	18	.357
The Citadel	3	–	11	.214	10	–	18	.357
† 1992 SoCon Tournament winner As of April 30, 1992; Rankings from AP poll

The 1991–92 East Tennessee State Buccaneers basketball team represented East Tennessee State University during the 1991-92 NCAA Division I men's basketball season. The team was led by 2nd year coach Alan LeForce. The Bucs finished the season 24–7 and 12–2 in Southern Conference play to finish in 1st place. They won the Southern Conference tournament championship in Asheville to receive the automatic berth to the NCAA tournament as the No. 14 seed in the Southeast region. They upset No. 3 Arizona in the 1st round and then lost to No.2 Michigan in the 2nd round.

== Roster ==
Player	Class	Pos	Height	Summary
Rodney English		F	6-4	17.5 Pts 7.5 Reb 2.6 Ast
Greg Dennis		C	6-11	16.2 Pts 6.5 Reb 1.6 Ast
Calvin Talford		F	6-4	16.2 Pts 5.5 Reb 1.7 Ast
Jason Niblett		G	5-11	10.2 Pts 2.6 Reb 3.7 Ast
Jerry Pelphrey		F	6-5	6.1 Pts 3.1 Reb 1.2 Ast
Trazel Silvers		F	6-5	5.7 Pts 4.5 Reb 0.6 Ast
Marty Story		F	6-3	5.1 Pts 2.3 Reb 1.4 Ast
Eric Palmer		G	5-7	4.6 Pts 1.1 Reb 1.8 Ast
Reese Dudley		G	5-11	3.9 Pts 0.8 Reb 0.4 Ast
Leslie Brunn		C	6-7	1.5 Pts 1.0 Reb 0.1 Ast
Damien Hodge		G	5-10	0.8 Pts 0.2 Reb 0.5 Ast
Robert Spears		C	6-9	1.0 Pts 1.1 Reb 0.0 Ast
Loren Riddick		G	6-2	0.4 Pts 0.6 Reb 0.1 Ast

== Schedule and results ==
Date time, TV	Rank^{#}	Opponent^{#}	Result	Record	Site city, state
Regular season
Nov 1991*		Wofford	W 89–70	1–0	Memorial Center; Johnson City, Tennessee
Nov 25, 1991*		at Tennessee	W 87–79	2–0	Thompson–Boling Arena; Knoxville, Tennessee
Nov 30, 1991*		Oral Roberts	W 109–93	3–0	Memorial Center; Johnson City, Tennessee
Dec 7, 1991*		Southern Miss	W 87–76	4–0	Memorial Center; Johnson City, Tennessee
Dec 14, 1991*		vs. Northeast Louisiana; Daiwa Ball	W 86–77	5–0	Yoyogi National Stadium; Tokyo, Japan
Dec 15, 1991*		vs. Oregon; Daiwa Ball	L 83–98	5–1	Yoyogi National Stadium; Tokyo, Japan
Dec 21, 1991*		at Austin Peay	L 85–89	5–2	Dunn Center; Clarksville, Tennessee
Dec 23, 1991*		James Madison	W 110–90	6–2	Memorial Center; Johnson City, Tennessee
Dec 27, 1991*		at Xavier	W 82–79	7–2	Cincinnati Gardens; Cincinnati, Ohio
Jan 4, 1992*		at Oral Roberts	L 83–85	7–3	Mabee Center; Tulsa, Oklahoma
Jan 7, 1992*		at Southern Miss	L 63–79	7–4	Reed Green Coliseum; Hattiesburg, Mississippi
Jan 11, 1992		at Furman	W 80–75	8–4 (1–0)	Greenville Memorial Auditorium; Greenville, South Carolina
Jan 13, 1992		at The Citadel	W 79–60	9–4 (2–0)	McAlister Field House; Charleston, South Carolina
Jan 18, 1992		Western Carolina	W 102–66	10–4 (3–0)	Memorial Center; Johnson City, Tennessee
Jan 20, 1992		Chattanooga	L 82–88	10–5 (3–1)	Memorial Center; Johnson City, Tennessee
Jan 25, 1992		at VMI	W 80–68	11–5 (4–1)	Cameron Hall; Lexington, Virginia
Jan 27, 1992		at Marshall	W 72–66	12–5 (5–1)	Cam Henderson Center; Huntington, West Virginia
Feb 1, 1992		Appalachian State	W 81–75	13–5 (6–1)	Memorial Center; Johnson City, Tennessee
Feb 6, 1992*		at NC State	W 72–66	14–5	Reynolds Coliseum; Raleigh, North Carolina
Feb 8, 1992		The Citadel	W 107–88	15–5 (7–1)	Memorial Center; Johnson City, Tennessee
Feb 10, 1992		Furman	L 94–103	15–6 (7–2)	Memorial Center; Johnson City, Tennessee
Feb 15, 1992		at Chattanooga	W 83–67	16–6 (8–2)	McKenzie Arena; Chattanooga, Tennessee
Feb 17, 1992		at Western Carolina	W 96–76	17–6 (9–2)	Ramsey Center; Cullowhee, North Carolina
Feb 22, 1992		Marshall	W 99–80	18–6 (10–2)	Memorial Center; Johnson City, Tennessee
Feb 24, 1992		VMI	W 92–84	19–6 (11–2)	Memorial Center; Johnson City, Tennessee
Feb 28, 1992		at Appalachian State	W 70–63	20–6 (12–2)	Varsity Gymnasium; Boone, North Carolina
SoCon tournament
Mar 6, 1992*	(1)	vs. (8) The Citadel; SoCon Tournament Quarterfinal	W 89–55	21–6	Asheville Civic Center; Asheville, North Carolina
Mar 7, 1992*	(1)	vs. (4) Appalachian State; SoCon Tournament Semifinal	W 77–69	22–6	Asheville Civic Center; Asheville, North Carolina
Mar 8, 1992*	(1)	vs. (2) Chattanooga; SoCon tournament championship	W 74–62	23–6	Asheville Civic Center; Asheville, North Carolina
NCAA tournament
Mar 20, 1992*	(14 SE)	vs. (3 SE) No. 10 Arizona; First Round	W 87–80	24–6	Omni Coliseum; Atlanta, Georgia
Mar 22, 1992*	(14 SE)	vs. (6 SE) No. 15 Michigan; Second Round	L 90–102	24–7	Omni Coliseum; Atlanta, Georgia
*Non-conference game. ^{#}Rankings from AP Poll. (#) Tournament seedings in parentheses. SE=Southeast. All times are in Eastern Time.
