= 1991–92 Iowa Hawkeyes men's basketball team =

American college basketball season

1991–92 Iowa Hawkeyes men's basketball

Amana-Hawkeye Classic Champions

NCAA men's Division I tournament, Round of 32
- Conference: Big Ten Conference
- Record: 19–11 (10–8 Big Ten)
- Head coach: Tom Davis (6th season)
- Assistant coaches: Bruce Pearl; Gary Close
- MVP: Acie Earl
- Home arena: Carver-Hawkeye Arena (Capacity: 15,500)

1991–92 Big Ten Conference men's basketball standings
	Conf.				Overall
Team	W		L	PCT	W		L	PCT
No. 3 Ohio State	15	–	3	.833	26	–	6	.813
No. 5 Indiana	14	–	4	.778	27	–	7	.794
No. 15 Michigan	11	–	7	.611	24	–	9	.727
No. 14 Michigan State	11	–	7	.611	22	–	8	.733
Iowa	10	–	8	.556	19	–	11	.633
Purdue	8	–	10	.444	18	–	15	.545
Minnesota	8	–	10	.444	16	–	16	.500
Illinois	7	–	11	.389	13	–	15	.464
Wisconsin	4	–	14	.222	13	–	18	.419
Northwestern	2	–	16	.111	9	–	19	.321
Rankings from AP Poll

The 1991–92 Iowa Hawkeyes men's basketball team represented the University of Iowa as members of the Big Ten Conference. The team was led by sixth-year head coach Tom Davis and played their home games at Carver-Hawkeye Arena. They ended the season 19–11 overall and 10–8 in Big Ten play to finish in fifth place. The Hawkeyes received an at-large bid to the NCAA tournament as #9 seed in the East Region. After defeating Texas 98–92 in the first round, the Hawkeyes lost to #1 seed Duke 75–62 in the Round of 32. It was the second consecutive season Iowa lost to the eventual National Champion Blue Devils.

== Roster ==
1991–92 Iowa Hawkeyes men's basketball team
Players
Coaches

Pos.	#	Name	Height	Weight	Year	Hometown
G	10	Kevin Smith	5 ft 11 in (1.8 m)	—	So	Fort Worth, Texas
G	11	Troy Skinner	6 ft 0 in (1.83 m)	—	Sr	Palmer, Iowa
G	13	Paul Lusk	—	—	So	New Baden, Illinois
G/F	15	Rodell Davis	6 ft 3 in (1.91 m)	—	Sr	Chicago, Illinois
G	20	Val Barnes	6 ft 2 in (1.88 m)	—	Jr	Wichita, Kansas
F	23	James Winters	6 ft 5 in (1.96 m)	—	So	Joliet, Illinois
F	24	James Moses	6 ft 4 in (1.93 m)	—	Sr	Carson, California
F	32	Jim Bartels	6 ft 6 in (1.98 m)	—	So	Freedom, Wisconsin
F	34	Wade Lookingbill	6 ft 5 in (1.96 m)	—	Jr	Fort Dodge, Iowa
F	40	Chris Street	6 ft 8 in (2.03 m)	210 lb (95 kg)	So	Indianola, Iowa
F	42	Jay Webb	6 ft 8 in (2.03 m)	—	Jr	San Jose, California
F	43	Brig Tubbs	6 ft 9 in (2.06 m)	—	Sr	DeWitt, Iowa
F/C	55	Acie Earl	6 ft 10 in (2.08 m)	225 lb (102 kg)	Jr	Moline, Illinois

Head coach

- Tom Davis (UW–Platteville)

Assistant coach(es)

- Bruce Pearl
- Gary Close

Legend

- (C) Team captain
- (S) Suspended
- (I) Ineligible
- (W) Walk-on
- Injured
- Current redshirt

== Schedule/results ==
Date time, TV	Rank^{#}	Opponent^{#}	Result	Record	Site city, state
Non-conference regular season
11/23/1991*	No. 21	Maryland Eastern Shore	W 101–45	1–0	Carver-Hawkeye Arena; Iowa City, IA
11/26/1991*	No. 21	Western Illinois	W 95–58	2–0	Carver-Hawkeye Arena; Iowa City, IA
12/3/1991*	No. 21	Drake; Iowa Big Four	W 83–56	3–0	Carver-Hawkeye Arena; Iowa City, IA
12/6/1991*	No. 21	Army; Amana-Hawkeye Classic	W 74–39	4–0	Carver-Hawkeye Arena (14,523); Iowa City, IA
12/7/1991*	No. 21	Louisiana Tech; Amana-Hawkeye Classic	W 84–65	5–0	Carver-Hawkeye Arena (15,500); Iowa City, IA
12/10/1991*	No. 16	at Northern Iowa; Iowa Big Four	W 108–85	6–0	UNI-Dome (19,042); Cedar Falls, IA
12/14/1991*	No. 16	at Iowa State; Rivalry	L 84–98	6–1	Hilton Coliseum; Ames, IA
12/27/1991*	No. 23	vs. Butler; Tampa Tribune Holiday Invitational	W 114–92	7–1	Sun Dome; Tampa, FL
12/28/1991*	No. 23	at South Florida; Tampa Tribune Holiday Invitational	L 78–85	7–2	Sun Dome; Tampa, FL
1/4/1992*		Centenary	W 121–76	8–2	Carver-Hawkeye Arena; Iowa City, IA
Big Ten Regular Season
1/9/1992	No. 16	No. 11 Michigan	L 77-80 ^{OT}	8–3 (0–1)	Carver-Hawkeye Arena (15,500); Iowa City, IA
1/11/1992		at Purdue	L 69-77	8–4 (0–2)	Mackey Arena; West Lafayette, IN
1/15/1992		Illinois	W 74-69	9–4 (1–2)	Carver-Hawkeye Arena; Iowa City, IA
1/19/1992		at No. 4 Ohio State	L 81-85	9–5 (1–3)	St. John Arena (13,276); Columbus, OH
1/22/1992		at Northwestern	W 78-71	10–5 (2–3)	Welsh-Ryan Arena (7,014); Evanston, IL
1/29/1992		Wisconsin	W 73-66	11–5 (3–3)	Carver-Hawkeye Arena; Iowa City, IA
2/1/1992		Minnesota	W 87-70	12–5 (4–3)	Carver-Hawkeye Arena; Iowa City, IA
2/6/1992		No. 11 Michigan State	W 77-63	13–5 (5–3)	Carver-Hawkeye Arena; Iowa City, IA
2/9/1992		at No. 6 Indiana	L 66-81	13–6 (5–4)	Assembly Hall (16,489); Bloomington, IN
2/12/1992		at No. 17 Michigan	L 74-79	13–7 (5–5)	Crisler Arena; Ann Arbor, MI
2/15/1992		Purdue	W 80-68	14–7 (6–5)	Carver-Hawkeye Arena (15,500); Iowa City, IA
2/18/1992		No. 6 Ohio State	W 92-86	15–7 (7–5)	Carver-Hawkeye Arena (15,500); Iowa City, IA
2/23/1992		at Illinois	L 72-77 ^{OT}	15–8 (7–6)	Assembly Hall (16,281); Champaign, IL
2/25/1992		at Minnesota	W 79-64	16–8 (8–6)	Williams Arena (15,937); Minneapolis, MN
3/4/1992		No. 2 Indiana	L 60-64	16–9 (8–7)	Carver-Hawkeye Arena (15,500); Iowa City, IA
3/7/1992		Wisconsin	W 70-65	17–9 (9–7)	Wisconsin Field House; Madison, WI
3/11/1992		Northwestern	W 69-66	18–9 (10–7)	Carver-Hawkeye Arena (15,500); Iowa City, IA
3/15/1992		No. 16 Michigan State	L 53-64	18–10 (10–8)	Breslin Center (15,138); East Lansing, MI
NCAA tournament
3/19/1992*; CBS	(9 E)	vs. (8 E) Texas; First Round	W 98-92	19–10	Greensboro Coliseum; Greensboro, NC
3/21/1992*; CBS	(9 E)	vs. (1 E) No. 1 Duke; Second Round	L 62-75	19–11	Greensboro Coliseum; Greensboro, NC
*Non-conference game. ^{#}Rankings from AP Poll. (#) Tournament seedings in parentheses. E=East.
