= 1991–92 Illinois Fighting Illini men's basketball team =

American college basketball season

1991–92 Illinois Fighting Illini men's basketball
- Conference: Big Ten Conference
- Record: 13–15 (7–11 Big Ten)
- Head coach: Lou Henson (17th season)
- Assistant coaches: Dick Nagy (13th season); Jimmy Collins (9th season); Mark Coomes (7th season)
- MVP: Deon Thomas
- Captains: Tom Michael; Deon Thomas
- Home arena: Assembly Hall

1991–92 Big Ten Conference men's basketball standings
	Conf.				Overall
Team	W		L	PCT	W		L	PCT
No. 3 Ohio State	15	–	3	.833	26	–	6	.813
No. 5 Indiana	14	–	4	.778	27	–	7	.794
No. 15 Michigan	11	–	7	.611	24	–	9	.727
No. 14 Michigan State	11	–	7	.611	22	–	8	.733
Iowa	10	–	8	.556	19	–	11	.633
Purdue	8	–	10	.444	18	–	15	.545
Minnesota	8	–	10	.444	16	–	16	.500
Illinois	7	–	11	.389	13	–	15	.464
Wisconsin	4	–	14	.222	13	–	18	.419
Northwestern	2	–	16	.111	9	–	19	.321
Rankings from AP Poll

The 1991–92 Illinois Fighting Illini men's basketball team represented the University of Illinois.

== Regular season ==
Illinois’ consecutive 20-win season streak was snapped in 1992 when the Illini posted its first losing record in 14 years, going 13–15. Despite their losing record, the Illini outscored their opponents by over 100 points during the season (1,954–1,843). To emphasize how close the Illini were to a successful season, of the eleven Big Ten conference games that they lost, eight were by nine points or less, of which four games were lost by three points or fewer. Based on the allegations of recruiting violations from Iowa assistant coach Bruce Pearl, the most satisfying win during the conference season took place on February 23, 1992, when the Illini would defeat the Hawkeyes in an overtime thriller at Assembly Hall.

=== Roster ===
1991–92 Illinois Fighting Illini men's basketball team
Players
Coaches

Pos.	#	Name	Height	Weight	Year	Previous school	Hometown
F	3	Tim Geers	6 ft 5 in (1.96 m)	200 lb (91 kg)	Jr	De La Salle High School	Chicago, Illinois
G	4	Brooks Taylor	6 ft 4 in (1.93 m)	185 lb (84 kg)	Jr	De La Salle High School	Chicago, Illinois
G	10	Will Tuttle	6 ft 1 in (1.85 m)	175 lb (79 kg)	Fr	Lincoln-Way Central High School	Mokena, Illinois
G	11	Rennie Clemons	6 ft 0 in (1.83 m)	185 lb (84 kg)	So	Calvary Academy	Springfield, Illinois
G	13	Doug Clarida	6 ft 0 in (1.83 m)	175 lb (79 kg)	Sr	Marion High School	Marion, Illinois
G	14	Matt Williams	6 ft 4 in (1.93 m)	175 lb (79 kg)	Fr	Libertyville High School	Libertyville, Illinois
F	21	Scott Pierce	6 ft 8 in (2.03 m)	200 lb (91 kg)	So	Trinity High School	Euless, Texas
F	23	Mike Duis	6 ft 5 in (1.96 m)	210 lb (95 kg)	RS Jr	Crescent-Iroquois High School	Crescent City, Illinois
F/C	25	Deon Thomas (C)	6 ft 9 in (2.06 m)	222 lb (101 kg)	RS So	Simeon High School	Chicago, Illinois
F	30	Robert Bennett	6 ft 6 in (1.98 m)	195 lb (88 kg)	Fr	Julian High School	Chicago, Illinois
F	32	Tom Michael (C)	6 ft 8 in (2.03 m)	215 lb (98 kg)	RS So	Carlyle High School	Hoffman, Illinois
F	33	Marc Davidson	6 ft 6 in (1.98 m)	215 lb (98 kg)	Fr	Aurora Christian High School	Minooka, Illinois
F	34	Andy Kaufmann (I) (redshirt)	6 ft 6 in (1.98 m)	225 lb (102 kg)	Sr	Jacksonville High School	Jacksonville, Illinois
G	42	Gene Cross	6 ft 3 in (1.91 m)	185 lb (84 kg)	So	Rich Central High School	Olympia Fields, Illinois
G	44	T.J. Wheeler	6 ft 4 in (1.93 m)	190 lb (86 kg)	So	Christopher High School	Buckner, Illinois
F	50	Matt Schnaderbeck	6 ft 5 in (1.96 m)	190 lb (86 kg)	Sr	Maine West High School	Des Plaines, Illinois
C	52	Steve Roth	6 ft 10 in (2.08 m)	240 lb (109 kg)	Fr	East High School	Belleville, Illinois

Head coach

- Lou Henson (New Mexico State University) (17th year)

Assistant coach(es)

- Jimmy Collins (New Mexico State) (9th year)
- Dick Nagy (Hardin-Simmons University) (13th year)
- Mark Coomes (New Mexico State) (7th year)

Legend

- (C) Team captain
- (S) Suspended
- (I) Ineligible
- (W) Walk-on
- Injured
- Current redshirt

Roster

== Schedule ==
Date time, TV	Rank^{#}	Opponent^{#}	Result	Record	Site (attendance) city, state
Non-Conference regular season
11/25/1991*		Penn State	L 50–65	0–1	Assembly Hall (12,183); Champaign, IL
11/30/1991*		Louisiana-Monroe	W 95–79	1–1	Assembly Hall (11,856); Champaign, IL
12/3/1991*		Tennessee State	W 78–56	2–1	Assembly Hall (11,274); Champaign, IL
12/6/1991*		Hawaii; Illini Classic	W 69–63	3–1	Assembly Hall (11,524); Champaign, IL
12/7/1991*		Washington; Illini Classic	W 76–55	4–1	Assembly Hall (11,939); Champaign, IL
12/10/1991*		at Temple	L 56–92	4–2	McGonigle Hall (3,623); Philadelphia, PA
12/21/1991*		Maryland Baltimore County	W 84–71	5–2	Assembly Hall (11,576); Champaign, IL
12/23/1991*		vs. No. 16 Missouri; Braggin' Rights	L 44–61	5–3	St. Louis Arena (18,034); St. Louis, MO
12/30/1991*		Illinois-Chicago	W 84–75 ^{ot}	6–3	Assembly Hall (11,200); Champaign, IL
1/4/1992*		No. 5 Connecticut	L 66–70	6–4	Assembly Hall (12,376); Champaign, IL
Big Ten regular season
1/8/1992		Purdue	W 74–72 ^{ot}	7–4 (1–0)	Assembly Hall (12,674); Champaign, IL
1/11/1992		at No. 9 Michigan State	L 75–77	7–5 (1–1)	Breslin Student Events Center (15,138); East Lansing, MI
1/15/1992		at Iowa; Rivalry	L 69–74	7–6 (1–2)	Carver–Hawkeye Arena (15,500); Iowa City, IA
1/18/1992		No. 15 Michigan	L 61–68	7–7 (1–3)	Assembly Hall (15,985); Champaign, IL
1/22/1992		Wisconsin	W 74–67	8–7 (2–3)	Assembly Hall (11,758); Champaign, IL
1/25/1992		at Minnesota	L 53–54	8–8 (2–4)	Williams Arena (16,126); Minneapolis, MN
1/30/1992		No. 10 Ohio State	L 72–74	8–9 (2–5)	Assembly Hall (12,558); Champaign, IL
2/1/1992		at Northwestern; Rivalry	L 43–46	8–10 (2–6)	Welsh-Ryan Arena (8,117); Evanston, IL
2/4/1992		No. 6 Indiana; Rivalry	L 65–76	8–11 (2–7)	Assembly Hall (15,590); Champaign, IL
2/11/1992		at Purdue	W 76–71 ^{ot}	9–11 (3–7)	Mackey Arena (14,123); West Lafayette, IN
2/15/1992		Minnesota	W 74–58	10–11 (4–7)	Assembly Hall (14,322); Champaign, IL
2/20/1992		at Wisconsin	L 78–92	10–12 (4–8)	Wisconsin Field House (9,403); Madison, WI
2/23/1992		Iowa; Rivalry	W 77–72 ^{ot}	11–12 (5–8)	Assembly Hall (16,281); Champaign, IL
2/26/1992		Northwestern; Rivalry	W 92–65	12–12 (6–8)	Assembly Hall (12,012); Champaign, IL
3/1/1992		at No. 2 Indiana; Rivalry	L 70–76	12–13 (6–9)	Assembly Hall (14,224); Bloomington, IN
3/7/1992		No. 13 Michigan State	W 80–71	13–13 (7–9)	Assembly Hall (14,087); Champaign, IL
3/11/1992		at No. 5 Ohio State	L 70–82	13–14 (7–10)	St. John Arena (13,276); Columbus, OH
3/14/1992		at No. 14 Michigan	L 59–68	13–15 (7–11)	Crisler Arena (13,605); Ann Arbor, MI
*Non-conference game. ^{#}Rankings from AP Poll. (#) Tournament seedings in parentheses. All times are in Central Time.

== Player stats ==
Player	Games Played	Minutes Played	2 pt. Field Goals	3 pt. Field Goals	Free Throws	Rebounds	Assists	Blocks	Steals	Points
Deon Thomas	28	946	199	0	144	193	20	44	25	542
Tom Michael	28	865	41	75	43	130	39	10	8	350
Rennie Clemons	28	930	93	11	93	106	137	7	42	312
T.J. Wheeler	27	780	55	29	81	111	72	3	18	278
Scott Pierce	28	518	54	1	52	97	26	9	9	163
Robert Bennett	28	504	55	2	17	105	14	12	12	133
Brooks Taylor	27	694	25	9	33	121	90	13	31	109
Marc Davidson	26	218	16	1	8	32	9	1	4	43
Will Tuttle	22	123	3	0	20	15	10	5	7	26
Steve Roth	16	35	3	0	3	9	1	2	1	9
Doug Clarida	13	21	0	1	3	3	2	0	0	6
Tim Geers	6	19	0	1	3	4	0	1	1	6
Matt Williams	6	6	2	0	0	2	0	0	0	4
Mike Duis	15	21	0	1	0	1	1	1	0	3
Gene Cross	1	1	0	0	0	0	0	0	0	0
Matt Schnaderbeck	6	6	0	0	0	0	0	0	0	0

== Awards and honors ==
- Deon Thomas
  - Fighting Illini All-Century team (2005)
  - Team Most Valuable Player
