= 1991–92 Penn State Nittany Lions basketball team =

American college basketball season

1991–92 Penn State Nittany Lions men's basketball

NIT
- Conference: Independent
- Record: 21-8
- Head coach: Bruce Parkhill (9th season)
- Home arena: Rec Hall

1991–92 NCAA Division I men's basketball independents standings
	Conf.				Overall
Team	W		L	PCT	W		L	PCT
UMKC	-	–	-	–	21	–	7	.750
Penn State	-	–	-	–	21	–	8	.724
UW-Milwaukee	-	–	-	–	20	–	8	.714
Southern Utah	-	–	-	–	20	–	8	.714
College of Charleston	-	–	-	–	19	–	8	.704
Notre Dame	-	–	-	–	18	–	15	.545
Cal State Northridge	-	–	-	–	11	–	17	.393
Northeastern Illinois	-	–	-	–	8	–	20	.286
Chicago State	-	–	-	–	7	–	21	.250
UNC Greensboro	-	–	-	–	7	–	21	.250
Youngstown State	-	–	-	–	6	–	22	.214
Sacramento State	-	–	-	–	4	–	24	.143
Rankings from AP Poll

The 1991–92 Penn State Nittany Lions men's basketball team represented the Pennsylvania State University during the 1991–92 NCAA Division I men's basketball season. The team was led by 9th-year head coach Bruce Parkhill, and played their home games at Rec Hall in University Park, Pennsylvania.

== Schedule ==
Date time, TV	Rank^{#}	Opponent^{#}	Result	Record	Site city, state
November 25		at Illinois	W 65–60	1–0	Assembly Hall (12,183); Champaign, Illinois
November 27		Buffalo	W 82–62	2–0	Rec Hall; University Park, Pennsylvania
December 2		at American	W 77–65	3–0	Bender Arena; Washington, D.C.
December 6		vs. St. Francis (NY); First Bank Classic	W 61–51	4–0	Bradley Center (600); Milwaukee, WI
December 7		at Marquette; First Bank Classic	W 60–56	5–0	Bradley Center; Milwaukee, WI
December 14		Bowling Green State	W 51–48	6–0	Rec Hall; University Park, Pennsylvania
December 18		vs. Drexel	W 80–65	7–0	Palestra (3,113); Philadelphia, PA
December 21		vs. Georgia	L 54–70	7–1	
December 27		vs. George Washington	L 57–71	7–2	
December 28		vs. Marshall	W 78–64	8–2	
January 2		at No. 7 Ohio State	L 63–73	8–3	St. John Arena; Columbus, Ohio
January 8		at James Madison	L 69–82	8–4	JMU Convocation Center; Harrisonburg, Virginia
January 11		Morgan State	W 102–51	9–4	Rec Hall; University Park, Pennsylvania
January 13		Brown	W 81–59	10–4	Rec Hall; University Park, Pennsylvania
January 16		at Marshall	W 67–60	11–4	Cam Henderson Center; Huntington, West Virginia
January 18		Miami (OH)	W 87–73	12–4	Rec Hall; University Park, Pennsylvania
January 21		at Butler	L 74–79	12–5	Hinkle Fieldhouse; Indianapolis, Indiana
January 25		vs. Penn	L 86–87	12–6	
January 27		Toledo	W 70–52	13–6	Rec Hall; University Park, Pennsylvania
February 1		Maryland-Baltimore County	W 93–59	14–6	Rec Hall; University Park, Pennsylvania
February 3		Duquesne	W 69–59	15–6	Rec Hall; University Park, Pennsylvania
February 5		at Old Dominion	W 84–79	16–6	Norfolk Scope; Norfolk, Virginia
February 9		vs. Temple	L 72–73 ^{2OT}	16–7	
February 12		Butler	W 67–64	17–7	Rec Hall; University Park, Pennsylvania
February 17		at Maryland-Baltimore County	W 81–77	18–7	RAC Arena
February 20		Lafayette	W 77–59	19–7	Rec Hall; University Park, Pennsylvania
February 24		Old Dominion	W 71–51	20–7	Rec Hall; University Park, Pennsylvania
March 3		American	W 79–73	21–7	Rec Hall; University Park, Pennsylvania
March 18		Pittsburgh; NIT First round	L 65–67	21–8	Rec Hall; University Park, Pennsylvania
*Non-conference game. ^{#}Rankings from AP Poll. (#) Tournament seedings in parentheses.
