= Michigan–Ohio State men's basketball rivalry =

American college basketball rivalry

- Michigan Wolverines Ohio State Buckeyes
- Sport: Basketball
- First meeting: February 17, 1909; Ohio State 29, Michigan 22
- Latest meeting: March 13, 2026; Michigan 71, Ohio State 67
- Next meeting: January 30, 2027 (Ann Arbor, MI)

Statistics
- Total meetings: 195
- All-time series: Ohio State leads, 108–87*
- Largest victory: Ohio State, 99–52 (1960)
- Longest win streak: Ohio State 8, (1967–1972)
- Current win streak: Michigan, 4 (2025–present)

The Michigan–Ohio State men's basketball rivalry is a college basketball rivalry between the Michigan Wolverines and Ohio State Buckeyes that is part of the larger rivalry between the University of Michigan and Ohio State University. The athletic rivalry includes the football rivalry, known as The Game, but extends to almost every sport, as well as many other endeavors and forms of achievement. Both teams are members of the Big Ten Conference.

== Series history ==
The Michigan-Ohio State basketball rivalry dates back to February 17, 1909. Ohio State currently leads the series 108–87.

The teams met for the first time in postseason play in the 1992 Elite Eight, with the one-seed Buckeyes led by the first two-time Big Ten Men's Basketball Player of the Year and consensus First Team All-American Jim Jackson, while the six-seed Wolverines were in the midst of a season dominated by the notorious Fab Five recruiting class, featuring USBWA National Freshman of the Year, and eventual #1 overall NBA draft, Chris Webber and fellow future first round NBA draft selections Jalen Rose and Juwan Howard. Despite the Buckeyes winning both regular season contests by double-digits, the Wolverines advanced to the Final Four thanks to a 75–71 overtime victory. This victory began a stretch in the rivalry where the Wolverines would win 11 of 12 (including the Elite Eight meeting).

Michigan and Ohio State would meet for the first time in the Big Ten Tournament in 1999, the second iteration of the conference's tournament. The Buckeyes, who finished the season in second place, defeated the tenth-seeded Wolverines 87–69. Starting with this game, running through 2012, the Ohio State would win their first six meetings with Michigan in the Big Ten Tournament. This stretch includes the teams' meeting in the 2010 Big Ten Tournament, when Evan Turner hit a near-half-court shot to send his one-seed Buckeyes over the eight-seed Wolverines, 69–68, resulting in one of the most famous shots in the series' history.

The March 18, 2013, ESPN The Magazine issue centered principally around the February 5th encounter between the #3 Wolverines, at home, against the #10 Buckeyes in its second 'One Day, One Game' issue. Michigan won the meeting in overtime, 76–74.

On February 21, 2021, for the first time in the series' 185 game history, both teams met while ranked in the Top 5. The Wolverines (15–1, 10–1 Big Ten) were ranked No. 3 in the AP Poll and Coaches Poll, while the Buckeyes (18–4, 12–4 Big Ten) were ranked No. 4 in the AP poll and Coaches Poll. Michigan won the game, 92–87.

== Rival accomplishments ==
The following summarizes the accomplishments of the two programs.

Team	Michigan	Ohio State
National titles	2	1
Final Four appearances	9*	11*
NCAA tournament appearances	33*	36*
NCAA tournament record	74–31*	58–35*
Big Ten tournament titles	4*	5*
Big Ten regular season titles	16	22*
Consensus first-team All-Americans	11	15
Naismith Players of the Year	1	1
Big Ten Players of the Year	6	7
All-time record	1,767–1,129*	1,905–1,211*
All-time winning percentage	.610*	.611*

Through April 6, 2026

- Due to player eligibility violations from the University of Michigan basketball scandal, Michigan was forced to vacate 117 games, including six wins against Ohio State, as well as three NCAA Tournament appearances, two Final Four appearances, one NIT Championship and one Big Ten tournament title. See Wikipedia:WikiProject College football/Vacated victories for further details for how vacated games are recorded.
- Due to player eligibility violations, Ohio State was forced to vacate 113 games, including six wins against Michigan, as well as four NCAA Tournament appearances, one Final Four appearance, two Big Ten regular season championships, and one Big Ten tournament title.

== Game results ==
Michigan victories	Ohio State victories	Tie games	Vacated wins

No.	Date	Location	Winner	Score
1	February 27, 1909	Columbus, OH	Ohio State	29–22
2	March 6, 1909	Ann Arbor, MI	Ohio State	42–26
3	January 21, 1918	Columbus, OH	Ohio State	37–7
4	March 9, 1918	Ann Arbor, MI	Ohio State	34–27
5	February 21, 1919	Ann Arbor, MI	Michigan	38–20
6	March 8, 1919	Columbus, OH	Michigan	23–20
7	January 31, 1920	Ann Arbor, MI	Ohio State	30–18
8	March 13, 1920	Columbus, OH	Ohio State	34–20
9	January 15, 1921	Ann Arbor, MI	Ohio State	22–10
10	March 5, 1921	Columbus, OH	Michigan	36–22
11	January 9, 1922	Ann Arbor, MI	Ohio State	25–22
12	February 11, 1922	Columbus, OH	Michigan	38–17
13	January 27, 1923	Ann Arbor, MI	Michigan	19–15
14	February 22, 1923	Columbus, OH	Michigan	39–14
15	January 17, 1925	Ann Arbor, MI	Michigan	39–29
16	February 16, 1925	Columbus, OH	Ohio State	32–13
17	February 20, 1926	Columbus, OH	Ohio State	32–12
18	March 6, 1926	Ann Arbor, MI	Michigan	44–28
19	January 16, 1928	Ann Arbor, MI	Michigan	41–21
20	February 27, 1928	Columbus, OH	Michigan	45–39
21	February 9, 1929	Columbus, OH	Michigan	34–24
22	March 2, 1929	Columbus, OH	Michigan	27–26
23	January 17, 1931	Columbus, OH	Ohio State	72–16
24	January 26, 1931	Ann Arbor, MI	Michigan	40–22
25	January 28, 1932	Columbus, OH	Michigan	38–25
26	March 7, 1932	Ann Arbor, MI	Michigan	30–27
27	January 26, 1934	Ann Arbor, MI	Michigan	32–28
28	February 17, 1934	Columbus, OH	Michigan	26–20
29	January 7, 1935	Ann Arbor, MI	Ohio State	33–30^{OT}
30	March 2, 1935	Columbus, OH	Ohio State	30–28
31	January 23, 1937	Ann Arbor, MI	Ohio State	37–32
32	February 27, 1937	Columbus, OH	Michigan	38–24
33	January 10, 1938	Ann Arbor, MI	Michigan	38–28
34	January 24, 1938	Columbus, OH	Michigan	29–26
35	January 23, 1939	Columbus, OH	Ohio State	45–31
36	February 27, 1939	Ann Arbor, MI	Ohio State	42–28
37	January 6, 1940	Ann Arbor, MI	Michigan	40–35
38	March 2, 1940	Columbus, OH	Ohio State	51–32
39	January 6, 1941	Ann Arbor, MI	Ohio State	49–39
40	March 1, 1941	Columbus, OH	Ohio State	45–37
41	January 24, 1942	Ann Arbor, MI	Michigan	53–39
42	February 20, 1943	Columbus, OH	Ohio State	46–44
43	February 22, 1943	Columbus, OH	Ohio State	53–38
44	January 28, 1944	Ann Arbor, MI	Ohio State	53–49
45	January 29, 1944	Ann Arbor, MI	Ohio State	52–39
46	December 30, 1944	Ann Arbor, MI	Ohio State	44–41^{OT}
47	January 21, 1945	Columbus, OH	Ohio State	61–47
48	December 29, 1945	Columbus, OH	Ohio State	57–40
49	January 26, 1946	Ann Arbor, MI	Michigan	62–46
50	February 8, 1947	Ann Arbor, MI	Michigan	56–53
51	March 3, 1947	Columbus, OH	Michigan	66–62
52	February 2, 1948	Columbus, OH	Ohio State	70–66
53	February 28, 1948	Ann Arbor, MI	Michigan	40–36
54	January 29, 1949	Ann Arbor, MI	Michigan	54–48
55	February 26, 1949	Columbus, OH	#18 Ohio State	69–44
56	January 16, 1950	Columbus, OH	#15 Ohio State	74–58
57	February 27, 1950	Ann Arbor, MI	#3 Ohio State	69–58
58	February 19, 1951	Ann Arbor, MI	Ohio State	68–66
59	February 23, 1952	Columbus, OH	Ohio State	80–67
60	January 5, 1953	Ann Arbor, MI	Ohio State	79–46
61	March 9, 1953	Columbus, OH	Ohio State	95–71
62	January 4, 1954	Ann Arbor, MI	Michigan	85–76
63	February 13, 1954	Columbus, OH	Ohio State	97–77
64	January 8, 1955	Ann Arbor, MI	Michigan	88–81
65	February 21, 1955	Columbus, OH	Ohio State	72–66
66	January 2, 1956	Ann Arbor, MI	No. 15 Ohio State	79–66
67	February 23, 1957	Columbus, OH	Ohio State	94–88
68	January 13, 1958	Ann Arbor, MI	Michigan	72–63
69	February 15, 1958	Columbus, OH	Ohio State	85–76
70	January 10, 1959	Ann Arbor, MI	Michigan	78–74
71	February 28, 1959	Columbus, OH	Ohio State	106–83
72	February 1, 1960	Columbus, OH	No. 5 Ohio State	99–52
73	February 4, 1961	Ann Arbor, MI	No. 1 Ohio State	80–58
74	January 13, 1962	Columbus, OH	No. 1 Ohio State	89–64
75	February 12, 1962	Ann Arbor, MI	No. 1 Ohio State	72–57
76	January 12, 1963	Columbus, OH	No. 4 Ohio State	68–66
77	February 16, 1963	Ann Arbor, MI	No. 9 Ohio State	75–68
78	January 18, 1964	Ann Arbor, MI	No. 3 Michigan	82–64
79	February 3, 1964	Columbus, OH	Ohio State	86–85
80	February 20, 1965	Ann Arbor, MI	No. 1 Michigan	100–61
81	March 8, 1965	Columbus, OH	Ohio State	93–85
82	January 8, 1966	Columbus, OH	Michigan	83–78
83	February 18, 1967	Ann Arbor, MI	Ohio State	97–85
84	January 20, 1968	Columbus, OH	Ohio State	103–70
85	January 27, 1968	Ann Arbor, MI	Ohio State	95–92
86	January 18, 1969	Ann Arbor, MI	No. 13 Ohio State	98–85
87	March 8, 1969	Columbus, OH	Ohio State	95–86
88	January 13, 1970	Columbus, OH	Ohio State	103–95
89	February 27, 1971	Ann Arbor, MI	No. 18 Ohio State	91–85
90	January 15, 1972	Columbus, OH	No. 9 Ohio State	84–73
91	January 29, 1972	Ann Arbor, MI	Michigan	88–78
92	January 6, 1973	Columbus, OH	Michigan	68–62
93	March 10, 1973	Ann Arbor, MI	Ohio State	102–87
94	February 9, 1974	Ann Arbor, MI	No. 16 Michigan	91–68
95	January 4, 1975	Ann Arbor, MI	No. 17 Michigan	85–73
96	March 8, 1975	Columbus, OH	Michigan	83–64
97	January 12, 1976	Ann Arbor, MI	No. 19 Michigan	84–81
98	February 9, 1976	Columbus, OH	No. 16 Michigan	90–66
99	January 24, 1977	Columbus, OH	No. 5 Michigan	92–81

No.	Date	Location	Winner	Score
100	February 5, 1977	Ann Arbor, MI	No. 7 Michigan	93–72
101	January 21, 1978	Columbus, OH	Ohio State	80–71
102	February 9, 1978	Ann Arbor, MI	Michigan	85–74
103	January 20, 1979	Ann Arbor, MI	No. 16 Ohio State	78–69
104	February 8, 1979	Columbus, OH	No. 13 Ohio State	63–60
105	January 19, 1980	Ann Arbor, MI	Michigan	75–74^{OT}
106	February 7, 1980	Columbus, OH	No. 13 Ohio State	66–63
107	January 24, 1981	Columbus, OH	Ohio State	69–63
108	February 12, 1981	Ann Arbor, MI	Ohio State	105–87
109	January 28, 1982	Ann Arbor, MI	Michigan	62–60^{OT}
110	February 18, 1982	Columbus, OH	Ohio State	64–63
111	January 20, 1983	Columbus, OH	Ohio State	75–68
112	February 26, 1983	Ann Arbor, MI	No. 15 Ohio State	81–71
113	January 18, 1984	Ann Arbor, MI	Ohio State	62–60
114	February 25, 1984	Columbus, OH	Michigan	62–59
115	January 5, 1985	Ann Arbor, MI	No. 16 Michigan	87–82
116	March 6, 1985	Columbus, OH	No. 2 Michigan	77–72
117	January 4, 1986	Columbus, OH	No. 2 Michigan	78–68
118	March 6, 1986	Ann Arbor, MI	No. 7 Michigan	99–82
119	January 8, 1987	Ann Arbor, MI	Michigan	107–92
120	February 5, 1987	Columbus, OH	Ohio State	95–87
121	January 18, 1988	Columbus, OH	Ohio State	70–68
122	March 12, 1988	Ann Arbor, MI	No. 10 Michigan	95–76
123	January 16, 1989	Ann Arbor, MI	No. 6 Michigan	99–73
124	February 23, 1989	Columbus, OH	No. 13 Michigan	89–72
125	January 18, 1990	Ann Arbor, MI	No. 6 Michigan	90–88
126	February 18, 1990	Columbus, OH	Ohio State	64–61
127	January 5, 1991	Ann Arbor, MI	No. 6 Ohio State	67–57
128	February 11, 1991	Columbus, OH	No. 3 Ohio State	81–65
129	February 2, 1992	Ann Arbor, MI	No. 10 Ohio State	68–58
130	March 3, 1992	Columbus, OH	No. 5 Ohio State	77–66
131	March 29, 1992	Lexington, KY	No. 15 Michigan	75–71^{OT}
132	January 26, 1993	Ann Arbor, MI	No. 5 Michigan^{†}	72–62
133	February 28, 1993	Columbus, OH	No. 5 Michigan^{†}	66–64
134	January 13, 1994	Ann Arbor, MI	No. 10 Michigan	86–75^{OT}
135	February 13, 1994	Columbus, OH	No. 11 Michigan	72–70
136	February 8, 1995	Ann Arbor, MI	Michigan	72–58
137	February 3, 1996	Columbus, OH	No. 20 Michigan^{†}	77–58
138	January 2, 1997	Ann Arbor, MI	Ohio State	73–71
139	March 9, 1997	Columbus, OH	Michigan^{†}	86–81^{OT}
140	January 17, 1998	Columbus, OH	No. 19 Michigan^{†}	79–61
141	February 11, 1998	Ann Arbor, MI	No. 21 Michigan^{†}	76–68
142	January 16, 1999	Ann Arbor, MI	Michigan^{†}	84–74
143	February 9, 1999	Columbus, OH	No. 13 Ohio State^{†}	74–69
144	March 5, 1999	Chicago, IL	No. 11 Ohio State^{†}	87–69
145	February 6, 2000	Ann Arbor, MI	No. 5 Ohio State^{†}	88–67
146	January 18, 2001	Columbus, OH	Ohio State^{†}	78–61
147	January 24, 2002	Columbus, OH	No. 20 Ohio State^{†}	69–47
148	March 2, 2002	Ann Arbor, MI	No. 18 Ohio State^{†}	84–75
149	March 8, 2002	Indianapolis, IN	No. 21 Ohio State^{†}	75–68
150	January 15, 2003	Columbus, OH	Michigan	61–50
151	February 15, 2003	Ann Arbor, MI	Michigan	70–54
152	February 29, 2004	Ann Arbor, MI	Michigan	75–64
153	February 5, 2005	Columbus, OH	Ohio State	72–46
154	February 9, 2006	Ann Arbor, MI	No. 19 Ohio State	94–85
155	February 25, 2006	Columbus, OH	No. 13 Ohio State	64–54
156	February 6, 2007	Columbus, OH	No. 3 Ohio State	76–63
157	March 3, 2007	Ann Arbor, MI	No. 1 Ohio State	65–61
158	March 9, 2007	Chicago, IL	No. 1 Ohio State	72–62
159	February 5, 2008	Columbus, OH	Ohio State	65–55
160	February 17, 2008	Ann Arbor, MI	Michigan	80–70
161	January 17, 2009	Ann Arbor, MI	Ohio State	65–58
162	January 28, 2009	Columbus, OH	Ohio State	72–54
163	January 3, 2010	Ann Arbor, MI	Michigan	73–64
164	February 27, 2010	Columbus, OH	No. 9 Ohio State	66–55
165	March 12, 2010	Indianapolis, IN	No. 5 Ohio State	69–68
166	January 12, 2011	Ann Arbor, MI	No. 2 Ohio State	68–64
167	February 3, 2011	Columbus, OH	No. 1 Ohio State	62–53
168	March 12, 2011	Indianapolis, IN	No. 1 Ohio State	68–61
169	January 29, 2012	Columbus, OH	No. 4 Ohio State	64–49
170	February 18, 2012	Ann Arbor, MI	No. 17 Michigan	56–51
171	March 10, 2012	Indianapolis, IN	No. 7 Ohio State	77–55
172	January 13, 2013	Columbus, OH	No. 15 Ohio State	56–53
173	February 5, 2013	Ann Arbor, MI	No. 3 Michigan	76–74^{OT}
174	February 11, 2014	Columbus, OH	No. 15 Michigan	70–60
175	March 15, 2014	Indianapolis, IN	No. 8 Michigan	72–69
176	January 13, 2015	Columbus, OH	Ohio State	71–52
177	February 22, 2015	Ann Arbor, MI	Michigan	64–57
178	February 16, 2016	Columbus, OH	Ohio State	76–66
179	February 4, 2017	Ann Arbor, MI	Ohio State	70–66
180	December 4, 2017	Columbus, OH	Ohio State	71–62
181	February 18, 2018	Ann Arbor, MI	No. 22 Michigan	74–62
182	January 29, 2019	Ann Arbor, MI	No. 5 Michigan	65–49
183	February 4, 2020	Ann Arbor, MI	Ohio State	61–58
184	March 1, 2020	Columbus, OH	No. 23 Ohio State	77–63
185	February 21, 2021	Columbus, OH	No. 3 Michigan	92–87
186	March 13, 2021	Indianapolis, IN	No. 9 Ohio State	68–67
187	February 12, 2022	Ann Arbor, MI	No. 16 Ohio State	68–57
188	March 6, 2022	Columbus, OH	Michigan	75–69
189	February 5, 2023	Ann Arbor, MI	Michigan	77–69
190	January 15, 2024	Ann Arbor, MI	Michigan	73–65
191	March 3, 2024	Columbus, OH	Ohio State	84–61
192	February 16, 2025	Columbus, OH	No. 20 Michigan	86–83
193	January 23, 2026	Ann Arbor, MI	No. 3 Michigan	74–62
194	February 8, 2026	Columbus, OH	No. 2 Michigan	82–61
195	March 13, 2026	Chicago, IL	No. 3 Michigan	71–67
Series: Ohio State leads 101–80
† Vacated result
