= 1992 Southern Conference men's basketball tournament =

- Classification: Division I
- Season: 1991–92
- Teams: 8
- Site: Asheville Civic Center; Asheville, NC
- Champions: East Tennessee State (4th title)
- Winning coach: Alan LeForce (2nd title)

1991–92 Southern Conference men's basketball standings
	Conf.				Overall
Team	W		L	PCT	W		L	PCT
East Tennessee State †	12	–	2	.857	24	–	7	.774
Chattanooga	12	–	2	.857	23	–	7	.767
Furman	9	–	5	.643	17	–	11	.607
Appalachian State	9	–	5	.643	15	–	14	.517
Western Carolina	5	–	9	.357	11	–	17	.393
Marshall	3	–	11	.214	7	–	22	.241
VMI	3	–	11	.214	10	–	18	.357
The Citadel	3	–	11	.214	10	–	18	.357
† 1992 SoCon Tournament winner As of April 30, 1992; Rankings from AP poll

The 1992 Southern Conference men's basketball tournament took place from March 6–8, 1992 at the Asheville Civic Center in Asheville, North Carolina. The East Tennessee State Buccaneers, led by head coach Alan LeForce, won their fourth Southern Conference title and received the automatic berth to the 1992 NCAA tournament.

== Format ==
All of the conference's eight members were eligible for the tournament. Teams were seeded based on conference winning percentage. The tournament used a preset bracket consisting of three rounds.

== Bracket ==
Quarterfinals; March 6
1	East Tennessee St.	89
8	The Citadel	55
4	Appalachian State	86
5	Western Carolina	69
2	Chattanooga	84
7	VMI	49
3	Furman	76
6	Marshall	83

Semifinals; March 7
1	East Tennessee St.	77
4	Appalachian State	69
2	Chattanooga	84
6	Marshall	68

Finals; March 8
1	East Tennessee St.	74
2	Chattanooga	63

* Overtime game

== See also ==
- List of Southern Conference men's basketball champions
