= 1991–92 Ohio State Buckeyes men's basketball team =

American college basketball season

1991–92 Ohio State Buckeyes men's basketball

Big Ten regular season champions

NCAA men's Division I tournament, Elite Eight
- Conference: Big Ten

Ranking
- Coaches: No. 3
- AP: No. 3
- Record: 26–6 (15–3 Big Ten)
- Head coach: Randy Ayers (3rd season)
- Home arena: St. John Arena

1991–92 Big Ten Conference men's basketball standings
	Conf.				Overall
Team	W		L	PCT	W		L	PCT
No. 3 Ohio State	15	–	3	.833	26	–	6	.813
No. 5 Indiana	14	–	4	.778	27	–	7	.794
No. 15 Michigan	11	–	7	.611	24	–	9	.727
No. 14 Michigan State	11	–	7	.611	22	–	8	.733
Iowa	10	–	8	.556	19	–	11	.633
Purdue	8	–	10	.444	18	–	15	.545
Minnesota	8	–	10	.444	16	–	16	.500
Illinois	7	–	11	.389	13	–	15	.464
Wisconsin	4	–	14	.222	13	–	18	.419
Northwestern	2	–	16	.111	9	–	19	.321
Rankings from AP Poll

The 1991–92 Ohio State Buckeyes men's basketball team represented Ohio State University as a member of the Big Ten Conference during the 1991–92 NCAA men's college basketball season.

== Roster ==
1991–92 Ohio State Buckeyes men's basketball team
Players
Coaches

Pos.	#	Name	Height	Weight	Year	Hometown
G	3	Mark Baker	6 ft 1 in (1.85 m)	180 lb (82 kg)	Jr	Dayton, OH
G	4	Doug Etzler	6 ft 0 in (1.83 m)	175 lb (79 kg)	Fr	Convoy, OH
G	15	Jamie Skelton	6 ft 2 in (1.88 m)	180 lb (82 kg)	So	Dayton, OH
G	20	Alex Davis	6 ft 1 in (1.85 m)	170 lb (77 kg)	Jr	Cincinnati, OH
F	21	Chris Jent	6 ft 7 in (2.01 m)	215 lb (98 kg)	Sr	Sparta, NJ
G	22	Jim Jackson	6 ft 6 in (1.98 m)	220 lb (100 kg)	Jr	Toledo, OH
G	30	Jamaal Brown	6 ft 4 in (1.93 m)	190 lb (86 kg)	Sr	Arlington, TX
F	31	Tom Brandewie	6 ft 9 in (2.06 m)	220 lb (100 kg)	Jr	Fort Loramie, OH
F	34	Lawrence Funderburke	6 ft 9 in (2.06 m)	225 lb (102 kg)	So	Columbus, OH
F	40	Rickey Dudley	6 ft 7 in (2.01 m)	230 lb (104 kg)	Fr	Henderson, TX
C	42	Steve Hall	6 ft 8 in (2.03 m)	225 lb (102 kg)	Sr	Payne, OH
F	44	Jimmy Ratliff	6 ft 9 in (2.06 m)	211 lb (96 kg)	So	Middleton, OH
C	54	Bill Robinson	7 ft 0 in (2.13 m)	245 lb (111 kg)	Sr	Canton, OH

Head coach

- Randy Ayers (Miami (OH))

Assistant coach(es)

Legend

- (C) Team captain
- (S) Suspended
- (I) Ineligible
- (W) Walk-on
- Injured
- Current redshirt

== Schedule and results ==
Date time, TV	Rank^{#}	Opponent^{#}	Result	Record	Site city, state
Non-conference regular season
Nov 26, 1991*	No. 7	Miami (OH)	W 94–61	1–0	St. John Arena; Columbus, Ohio
Nov 30, 1991*	No. 5	Chicago State	W 116–44	2–0	St. John Arena; Columbus, Ohio
Dec 4, 1991*	No. 4	Ohio	W 78–62	3–0	St. John Arena; Columbus, Ohio
Dec 7, 1991*	No. 4	Oregon State	W 84–58	4–0	St. John Arena; Columbus, Ohio
Dec 14, 1991*	No. 4	Howard	W 114–53	5–0	St. John Arena; Columbus, Ohio
Dec 18, 1991*	No. 4	at UC Santa Barbara	W 82–75	6–0	The Thunderdome; Santa Barbara, California
Dec 21, 1991*	No. 4	at USC	L 77–79 ^{OT}	6–1	L.A. Sports Arena; Los Angeles, California
Dec 29, 1991*	No. 7	American	W 96–70	7–1	St. John Arena; Columbus, Ohio
Jan 2, 1992*	No. 7	Penn State	W 73–63	8–1	St. John Arena; Columbus, Ohio
Big Ten Regular season
Jan 7, 1992	No. 7	No. 9 Michigan State	W 62–46	9–1 (1–0)	St. John Arena; Columbus, Ohio
Jan 11, 1992	No. 7	at Northwestern	W 60–52	10–1 (2–0)	Welsh-Ryan Arena; Evanston, Illinois
Jan 14, 1992	No. 4	at No. 5 Indiana	L 83–91	10–2 (2–1)	Assembly Hall; Bloomington, Indiana
Jan 19, 1992	No. 4	Iowa	W 85–81	11–2 (3–1)	St. John Arena; Columbus, Ohio
Jan 22, 1992	No. 6	Minnesota	W 72–69	12–2 (4–1)	St. John Arena; Columbus, Ohio
Jan 26, 1992*	No. 6	at Seton Hall	L 64–68	12–3	Meadowlands Arena; East Rutherford, New Jersey
Jan 30, 1992	No. 10	at Illinois	W 74–72	13–3 (5–1)	Assembly Hall; Champaign, Illinois
Feb 2, 1992	No. 10	at No. 15 Michigan; Michigan–Ohio State rivalry	W 68–58	14–3 (6–1)	Crisler Arena; Ann Arbor, Michigan
Feb 5, 1992	No. 8	Wisconsin	W 86–72	15–3 (7–1)	St. John Arena; Columbus, Ohio
Feb 8, 1992	No. 8	Purdue	W 71–59	16–3 (8–1)	St. John Arena; Columbus, Ohio
Feb 15, 1992	No. 8	at Wisconsin	W 67–63	17–3 (9–1)	Wisconsin Field House; Madison, Wisconsin
Feb 18, 1992	No. 6	at Iowa	L 86–92	17–4 (9–2)	Carver-Hawkeye Arena; Iowa City, Iowa
Feb 23, 1992	No. 6	No. 7 Indiana	L 80–86	17–5 (9–3)	St. John Arena; Columbus, OH
Feb 26, 1992	No. 8	at Purdue	W 71–64	18–5 (10–3)	Mackey Arena; West Lafayette, Indiana
Feb 29, 1992	No. 8	at No. 12 Michigan State	W 78–65	19–5 (11–3)	Breslin Student Events Center; East Lansing, Michigan
Mar 3, 1992	No. 5	No. 18 Michigan; Michigan–Ohio State rivalry	W 77–66	20–5 (12–3)	St. John Arena; Columbus, Ohio
Mar 7, 1992	No. 5	Northwestern	W 93–78	21–5 (13–3)	St. John Arena; Columbus, Ohio
Mar 11, 1992	No. 5	Illinois	W 82–70	22–5 (14–3)	St. John Arena; Columbus, Ohio
Mar 14, 1992	No. 5	at Minnesota	W 94–63	23–5 (15–3)	Williams Arena; Minneapolis, Minnesota
NCAA tournament
Mar 19, 1992*	(1 SE) No. 3	vs. (16 SE) Mississippi Valley State; First round	W 83–56	24–5	Riverfront Coliseum; Cincinnati, Ohio
Mar 21, 1992*	(1 SE) No. 3	vs. (9 SE) Connecticut; Second Round	W 78–55	25–5	Riverfront Coliseum; Cincinnati, Ohio
Mar 27, 1992*	(1 SE) No. 3	vs. (4 SE) No. 18 North Carolina; Southeast Regional semifinal	W 80–73	26–5	Rupp Arena; Lexington, Kentucky
Mar 29, 1992*	(1 SE) No. 3	vs. (6 SE) No. 15 Michigan; Southeast Regional Final; Michigan–Ohio State rivalry	L 71–75 ^{OT}	26–6	Rupp Arena; Lexington, Kentucky
*Non-conference game. ^{#}Rankings from AP Poll. (#) Tournament seedings in parentheses. SE=Southeast.

=== NCAA basketball tournament ===
- Southeast
  - Ohio State 83, Mississippi Valley 56
  - Ohio State 78, Connecticut 55
  - Ohio State 80, North Carolina 73
  - Michigan 75, Ohio State 71

== Awards and honors ==
- Jim Jackson, Chicago Tribune Silver Basketball, Consensus First-team All-American

== Team players drafted into the NBA ==
Round	Pick	Player	NBA club
1	4	Jim Jackson	Dallas Mavericks
