= 1992 Great Midwest Conference men's basketball tournament =

- Classification: Division I
- Season: 1991–92
- Teams: 6
- Site: Chicago Stadium; Chicago, Illinois
- Champions: Cincinnati (1st title)
- Winning coach: Bob Huggins (1st title)

1991–92 Great Midwest Conference men's basketball standings
	Conf.				Overall
Team	W		L	PCT	W		L	PCT
No. 12 Cincinnati †	8	–	2	.800	29	–	5	.853
No. 24 DePaul	8	–	2	.800	20	–	9	.690
Marquette	5	–	5	.500	16	–	13	.552
Memphis State	5	–	5	.500	23	–	11	.676
UAB	4	–	6	.400	20	–	9	.690
Saint Louis	0	–	10	.000	5	–	23	.179
† 1992 GMC tournament winner Rankings from AP Poll

The 1992 Great Midwest Conference men's basketball tournament was held March 12–14, 1992. It was the Great Midwest Conference's first tournament. Although its winner did not receive an automatic bid to the 1992 NCAA tournament, the tournament champion, Cincinnati, received an at-large bid and advanced to the Final Four.

== Bracket and results ==
Quarterfinals; Thursday, March 12
3	Marquette	74
6	Saint Louis	63
4	Memphis State	79
5	UAB	67

Semifinals; Friday, March 13
1	#12 Cincinnati	62
3	Marquette	49
2	#19 DePaul	75
4	Memphis State	95

Final; Saturday, March 14
1	#12 Cincinnati	75
4	Memphis State	63
