= 1991–92 Howard Bison men's basketball team =

American college basketball season

1991–92 Howard Bison men's basketball
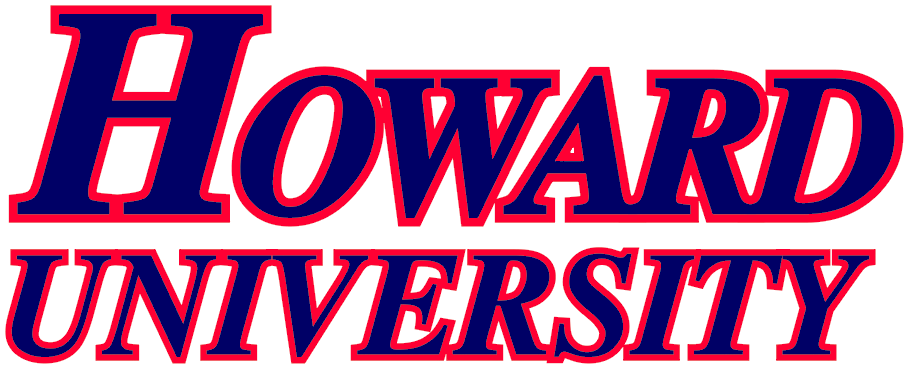

MEAC Regular season and Tournament champion

NCAA tournament, First Round
- Conference: Mid-Eastern Athletic Conference
- Record: 17–14 (12–4 MEAC)
- Head coach: Butch Beard (2nd season)
- Home arena: Burr Gymnasium

1991–92 MEAC men's basketball standings
	Conf.				Overall
Team	W		L	PCT	W		L	PCT
North Carolina A&T	12	–	4	.750	18	–	9	.667
Howard †	12	–	4	.750	17	–	14	.548
Florida A&M	11	–	5	.688	16	–	14	.533
Coppin State	9	–	7	.563	15	–	13	.536
South Carolina State	9	–	7	.563	14	–	15	.483
Delaware State	9	–	7	.563	12	–	16	.429
Morgan State	5	–	11	.313	6	–	23	.207
Bethune–Cookman	3	–	13	.188	4	–	25	.138
Maryland Eastern Shore	2	–	14	.125	3	–	25	.107
† 1992 MEAC tournament winner Rankings from AP Poll

The 1991–92 Howard Bison men's basketball team represented Howard University in the 1991–92 NCAA Division I men's basketball season. The Bison, led by second-year head coach Butch Beard, played their home games at Burr Gymnasium in Washington, D.C. as members of the Mid-Eastern Athletic Conference. They finished the season 17–14, 12–4 in MEAC play to win the conference regular season title. Howard followed that success by winning the MEAC tournament to earn an automatic bid to the NCAA tournament. As the No. 16 seed in the Midwest Region, the Bison were defeated by No. 1 seed Kansas in the opening round, 100–67.

== Roster ==
1991–92 Howard Bison men's basketball team
Players
Coaches

Pos.	#	Name	Height	Weight	Year	Hometown
G		Milan Brown	6 ft 0 in (1.83 m)	—	Jr
G		Howard Holley	6 ft 1 in (1.85 m)	—	Sr
F		Julius McNeil	6 ft 6 in (1.98 m)	—	Sr

Head coach

- Butch Beard (Louisville)

Assistant coach(es)

Legend

- (C) Team captain
- (S) Suspended
- (I) Ineligible
- (W) Walk-on
- Injured
- Current redshirt

Roster
Last update: March 21, 2021

== Schedule and results ==
Date time, TV	Rank^{#}	Opponent^{#}	Result	Record	Site (attendance) city, state
Regular season
Nov 23, 1991*		at No. 25 Louisville	L 73–102	0–1	Freedom Hall (19,315); Louisville, Kentucky
Nov 26, 1991*		at Florida	L 60–74	0–2	Stephen C. O'Connell Center (5,022); Gainesville, Florida
Nov 30, 1991*		at Minnesota	L 54–95	0–3	Williams Arena (12,923); Minneapolis, Minnesota
Dec 4, 1991*		Northeastern	L 67–71	0–4	Burr Gymnasium (872); Washington, D.C.
Dec 6, 1991*		at Miami (FL)	W 64–55	1–4	Miami Arena (2,012); Miami, Florida
Dec 14, 1991*		at No. 4 Ohio State	L 53–114	1–5	St. John Arena (13,276); Columbus, Ohio
Dec 16, 1991*		at Toledo	L 62–80	1–6	John F. Savage Hall (4,585); Toledo, Ohio
Dec 19, 1991*		Paine College	L 78–79	1–7	Burr Gymnasium (250); Washington, D.C.
Dec 21, 1991*		at Wisconsin	L 57–64	1–8	Wisconsin Field House (8,642); Madison, Wisconsin
Dec 30, 1991*		Towson State	W 74–69	2–8	Burr Gymnasium (250); Washington, D.C.
Jan 2, 1992*		at Eastern Kentucky	L 62–77	2–9	Alumni Coliseum (1,200); Richmond, Kentucky
Jan 4, 1992		North Carolina A&T	W 68–59	3–9 (1–0)	Burr Gymnasium (1,250); Washington, D.C.
Jan 6, 1992		South Carolina State	W 64–61	4–9 (2–0)	Burr Gymnasium (1,250); Washington, D.C.
Jan 11, 1992		at Delaware State	L 95–96 ^{2OT}	4–10 (2–1)	Memorial Hall (2,145); Dover, Delaware
Jan 16, 1992		at Bethune–Cookman	W 91–70	5–10 (3–1)	Moore Gymnasium (2,300); Daytona Beach, Florida
Jan 20, 1992		at Florida A&M	L 67–78	5–11 (3–2)	Jake Gaither Gymnasium (3,929); Tallahassee, Florida
Jan 23, 1992		Maryland Eastern Shore	W 87–54	6–11 (4–2)	Burr Gymnasium (1,925); Washington, D.C.
Jan 25, 1992		at Coppin State	W 66–64	7–11 (5–2)	Coppin Center (2,000); Baltimore, Maryland
Jan 27, 1992		at Morgan State	W 78–63	8–11 (6–2)	Talmadge L. Hill Field House (4,275); Baltimore, Maryland
Feb 1, 1992		Coppin State	W 69–64	9–11 (7–2)	Burr Gymnasium (2,750); Washington, D.C.
Feb 6, 1992		Bethune–Cookman	W 101–65	10–11 (8–2)	Burr Gymnasium (2,025); Washington, D.C.
Feb 10, 1992		Florida A&M	W 72–68	11–11 (9–2)	Burr Gymnasium (2,825); Washington, D.C.
Feb 12, 1992		at Maryland Eastern Shore	W 63–62	12–11 (10–2)	J. Millard Tawes Gymnasium (1,000); Princess Anne, Maryland
Feb 15, 1992		at North Carolina A&T	L 65–66	12–12 (10–3)	Corbett Sports Center (7,563); Greensboro, North Carolina
Feb 17, 1992		at South Carolina State	L 59–61	12–13 (10–4)	SHM Memorial Center (2,554); Orangeburg, South Carolina
Feb 22, 1992		Morgan State	W 82–64	13–13 (11–4)	Burr Gymnasium (2,825); Washington, D.C.
Feb 27, 1992		Delaware State	W 79–65	14–13 (12–4)	Burr Gymnasium (2,475); Washington, D.C.
MEAC tournament
Mar 5, 1992*	(1)	vs. (8) Bethune–Cookman; Quarterfinals	W 58–54	15–13	Norfolk Scope (853); Norfolk, Virginia
Mar 6, 1992*	(1)	vs. (5) South Carolina State; Semifinals	W 76–73	16–13	Norfolk Scope (2,000); Norfolk, Virginia
Mar 7, 1992*	(1)	vs. (3) Florida A&M; Championship Game	W 67–65	17–13	Norfolk Scope (4,011); Norfolk, Virginia
NCAA tournament
Mar 20, 1992*; CBS	(16 MW)	vs. (1 MW) No. 2 Kansas; First Round	L 67–100	17–14	University of Dayton Arena (13,007); Dayton, Ohio
*Non-conference game. ^{#}Rankings from AP Poll. (#) Tournament seedings in parentheses. All times are in Central.
