= 1991–92 Marquette Warriors men's basketball team =

American college basketball season

1991–92 Marquette Warriors men's basketball
- Conference: Great Midwest Conference
- Record: 16–13 (5–5 GMC)
- Head coach: Kevin O'Neill (3rd season)
- Home arena: Bradley Center

1991–92 Great Midwest Conference men's basketball standings
	Conf.				Overall
Team	W		L	PCT	W		L	PCT
No. 12 Cincinnati †	8	–	2	.800	29	–	5	.853
No. 24 DePaul	8	–	2	.800	20	–	9	.690
Marquette	5	–	5	.500	16	–	13	.552
Memphis State	5	–	5	.500	23	–	11	.676
UAB	4	–	6	.400	20	–	9	.690
Saint Louis	0	–	10	.000	5	–	23	.179
† 1992 GMC tournament winner Rankings from AP Poll

The 1991–92 Marquette Warriors men's basketball team represented Marquette University during the 1991–92 men's college basketball season.

== Roster ==
1991–92 Marquette Warriors men's basketball team
Players
Coaches

Pos.	#	Name	Height	Weight	Year	Hometown
G	20	Craig Aamot	6 ft 2 in (1.88 m)	190 lb (86 kg)	Fr	Waukesha, Wisconsin
F	4	Charles Brakes	6 ft 6 in (1.98 m)	190 lb (86 kg)	So	Chicago, Illinois
F	33	Ron Curry	6 ft 8 in (2.03 m)	190 lb (86 kg)	Jr	Bloomington, Illinois
G	22	William Gates	6 ft 0 in (1.83 m)	175 lb (79 kg)	Fr	Chicago, Illinois
F	35	Damon Key	6 ft 8 in (2.03 m)	245 lb (111 kg)	So	Milwaukee, Wisconsin
G	12	Robb Logterman	6 ft 3 in (1.91 m)	170 lb (77 kg)	So	Janesville, Wisconsin
C	00	Amal McCaskill	6 ft 11 in (2.11 m)	220 lb (100 kg)	Fr	Maywood, Illinois
C	34	Jim McIlvaine	7 ft 1 in (2.16 m)	240 lb (109 kg)	So	Racine, Wisconsin
G	10	Tony Miller	6 ft 0 in (1.83 m)	189 lb (86 kg)	Fr	Cleveland, Ohio
G	21	Ben Peavy	6 ft 4 in (1.93 m)	170 lb (77 kg)	Jr	San Antonio, Texas
F	42	Shannon Smith	6 ft 6 in (1.98 m)	195 lb (88 kg)	Fr	Milwaukee, Wisconsin
F	32	Jay Zulauf	6 ft 6 in (1.98 m)	205 lb (93 kg)	Jr	Port Huron, Michigan

Head coach

- Kevin O'Neill

Assistant coach(es)

- Bo Ellis
- Dan Theiss
- Craig McMillan

Legend

- (C) Team captain
- (S) Suspended
- (I) Ineligible
- (W) Walk-on
- Injured
- Current redshirt

== Schedule ==
Date time, TV	Rank^{#}	Opponent^{#}	Result	Record	Site city, state
November 22*		Prairie View A&M	W 98–55	1–0	Bradley Center (11,871); Milwaukee, WI
November 28*		Northern Illinois	W 78–71	2–0	Bradley Center (12,376); Milwaukee, WI
December 6*		Columbia; First Bank Classic	W 71–63	3–0	Bradley Center (11,408); Milwaukee, WI
December 7*		Penn State; First Bank Classic	L 56–60	3–1	Bradley Center (12,748); Milwaukee, WI
December 15*		Sacramento State	W 79–35	4–1	Bradley Center (13,091); Milwaukee, WI
December 17*		Mississippi Valley State	W 87–62	5–1	Bradley Center (10,650); Milwaukee, WI
December 21*		Bethune-Cookman	W 89–53	6–1	Bradley Center (11,815); Milwaukee, WI
December 23*		Sam Houston State	W 75–44	7–1	Bradley Center (11,364); Milwaukee, WI
December 30*		Maryland-Baltimore County	W 93–63	8–1	Bradley Center (11,549); Milwaukee, WI
January 2*		Chicago State	W 92–55	9–1	Bradley Center (12,296); Milwaukee, WI
January 4*		Wisconsin	L 63–81	9–2	Wisconsin Field House (12,290); Madison, WI
January 8*		Dayton	L 57–60	9–3	University of Dayton Arena (12,149); Dayton, Ohio
January 11		UAB	W 66–54	10–3 (1—0)	Bradley Center (12,489); Milwaukee, WI
January 14*		at No. 3 Oklahoma State	L 52–64	10–4 (1—0)	Gallagher-Iba Arena (6,381); Stillwater, Oklahoma
January 18		at Saint Louis	W 70–67	11–4 (2—0)	St. Louis Arena (10,055); St. Louis, Missouri
January 21*		Notre Dame	L 63–69	11–5 (2—0)	Bradley Center (15,431); Milwaukee, WI
January 25		at Memphis State	L 55–59	11–6 (2—1)	The Pyramid (15,105); Memphis, Tennessee
January 28*		Kansas	L 61–85	11–7 (2—1)	Bradley Center (13,817); Milwaukee, WI
February 1		Cincinnati	L 59–70	11–8 (2—2)	Bradley Center (13,648); Milwaukee, WI
February 4*		N. C. State	W 66–42	12–8 (2—2)	Bradley Center (12,207); Milwaukee, WI
February 9		DePaul	L 58–65	12–9 (2—3)	Bradley Center (14,527); Milwaukee, WI
February 15		at UAB	L 60–64	12–10 (2—4)	Bartow Arena (8,216); Birmingham, Alabama
February 18*		at Notre Dame	L 53–60	12–11 (2—4)	Joyce Center (8,556); South Bend, Indiana
February 22		Saint Louis	W 71–48	13–11 (3—4)	Bradley Center (12,699); Milwaukee, WI
February 27		at Cincinnati	L 59–70	13–12 (3—5)	Fifth Third Arena (13,176); Cincinnati, Ohio
February 29		Memphis State	W 82–67	14–12 (4—5)	Bradley Center (13,051); Milwaukee, WI
March 4		at No. 15 DePaul	W 73–65	15–12 (5—5)	Rosemont Horizon (9,102); Rosemont, Illinois
March 12		vs. Saint Louis; Great Midwest Conference tournament	W 74–63	16–12 (6–5)	Chicago Stadium (7,089); Chicago, Illinois
March 13		vs. Cincinnati; Great Midwest Conference tournament	L 49–62	16–13 (6–6)	Chicago Stadium (8,776); Chicago, Illinois
*Non-conference game. ^{#}Rankings from AP Poll. (#) Tournament seedings in parentheses.
