= 1991–92 Michigan State Spartans men's basketball team =

American college basketball season

1991–92 Michigan State Spartans men's basketball

Maui Invitational champions Oldsmobile Spartan Classic champions

NCAA tournament, second round
- Conference: Big Ten Conference

Ranking
- Coaches: No. 15
- AP: No. 14
- Record: 22–8 (11–7 Big Ten)
- Head coach: Jud Heathcote (16th season)
- Assistant coaches: Tom Izzo; Jim Boylen; Stan Joplin
- Captains: Mark Montgomery; Matt Steigenga
- Home arena: Breslin Center

1991–92 Big Ten Conference men's basketball standings
	Conf.				Overall
Team	W		L	PCT	W		L	PCT
No. 3 Ohio State	15	–	3	.833	26	–	6	.813
No. 5 Indiana	14	–	4	.778	27	–	7	.794
No. 15 Michigan	11	–	7	.611	24	–	9	.727
No. 14 Michigan State	11	–	7	.611	22	–	8	.733
Iowa	10	–	8	.556	19	–	11	.633
Purdue	8	–	10	.444	18	–	15	.545
Minnesota	8	–	10	.444	16	–	16	.500
Illinois	7	–	11	.389	13	–	15	.464
Wisconsin	4	–	14	.222	13	–	18	.419
Northwestern	2	–	16	.111	9	–	19	.321
Rankings from AP Poll

The 1991–92 Michigan State Spartans men's basketball team represented Michigan State University in the 1991–92 NCAA Division I men's basketball season. The team played their home games at Breslin Center in East Lansing, Michigan and were members of the Big Ten Conference. They were coached by Jud Heathcote in his 16th year at Michigan State. The Spartans finished the season with a record of 22–8, 11–7 to finish in third place in Big Ten play. They received an at-large bid to the NCAA tournament as the No. 5 seed in the Midwest region, the school's third consecutive trip to the tournament. There they beat Southwest Missouri State before losing to Cincinnati in the second round in a rematch of an earlier Spartan win.

== Previous season ==
The Spartans finished the 1990–91 season with an overall record of 19–11, 11–7 to finish in third place in the Big Ten. Michigan State received an at-large bid to the NCAA tournament as the No. 5 seed in the Midwest region. They beat Green Bay in the first round and lost to Utah in the second round.

== Roster ==
1991–92 Michigan State Spartans men's basketball team
No	Name	Pos	Year	Height	Pts	Reb	Ast
20	Mark Bluem	F	FR	6–6	0.6	0.3	0.0
34	Anthony Miller	F	SO	6–9	7.2	5.2	0.8
11	Mark Montgomery	G	SR	6–2	7.0	3.7	6.3
54	Mike Peplowski	C	JR	6–10	13.3	8.3	1.1
24	Shawn Respert	G	FR	6–3	15.8	2.1	2.1
13	Eric Snow	G	FR	6–3	1.1	0.6	1.0
35	Matt Steigenga	F	SR	6–7	10.2	4.5	2.0
31	Dwayne Stephens	F	JR	6–7	11.1	5.0	2.8
3	Kris Weshinskey	G	SO	6–3	6.4	1.5	1.5
25	Jon Zulauf	F	JR	6–6	3.1	1.6	0.5

== Schedule and results ==
Date time, TV	Rank^{#}	Opponent^{#}	Result	Record	Site city, state
Non-conference regular season
Nov 25, 1991*		vs. Lamar; Maui Invitational quarterfinals	W 81–68	1–0	Lahaina Civic Center; Maui, HI
Nov 26, 1991*		vs. Rice; Maui Invitational semifinals	W 75–67	2–0	Lahaina Civic Center; Maui, HI
Nov 27, 1991*		vs. No. 2 Arkansas; Maui Invitational championship	W 78–59	3–0	Lahaina Civic Center; Maui, HI
Dec 4, 1991*	No. 22	Nebraska	W 101–78	4–0	Breslin Center; East Lansing, MI
Dec 7, 1991*	No. 22	at Dayton	W 83–74	5–0	University of Dayton Arena; Dayton, OH
Dec 14, 1991*	No. 13	Detroit	W 91–75	6–0	Breslin Center; East Lansing, MI
Dec 17, 1991*	No. 12	UIC	W 75–51	7–0	Breslin Center; East Lansing, MI
Dec 21, 1991*	No. 12	Cincinnati	W 90–89	8–0	Breslin Center; East Lansing, MI
Dec 27, 1991*	No. 9	Austin Peay; Oldsmobile Spartan Classic semifinals	W 82–71	9–0	Breslin Center; East Lansing, MI
Dec 28, 1991*	No. 9	Stanford; Oldsmobile Spartan Classic championship	W 72–62	10–0	Breslin Center; East Lansing, MI
Big Ten regular season
Jan 7, 1992	No. 9	at No. 7 Ohio State	L 46–62	10–1 (0–1)	St. John Arena; Columbus, OH
Jan 11, 1992	No. 9	Illinois	W 77–75	11–1 (1–1)	Breslin Center; East Lansing, MI
Jan 15, 1992	No. 11	Northwestern	W 78–61	12–1 (2–1)	Breslin Center; East Lansing, MI
Jan 18, 1992	No. 11	at Minnesota	W 86–70	12–2 (2–2)	Williams Arena; Minneapolis, MN
Jan 22, 1992	No. 14	at Purdue	W 66–61	13–2 (3–2)	Mackey Arena; West Lafayette, IN
Jan 29, 1992	No. 13	No. 15 Michigan; Rivalry	L 79–89	13–3 (3–3)	Breslin Center; East Lansing, MI
Feb 1, 1992	No. 13	No. 4 Indiana	W 72–64	14–3 (4–3)	Breslin Center; East Lansing, MI
Feb 6, 1992	No. 11	at Iowa	L 63–77	14–4 (4–4)	Carver-Hawkeye Arena; Iowa City, IA
Feb 8, 1992	No. 11	at Wisconsin	W 79–64	15–4 (5–4)	Wisconsin Field House; Madison, WI
Feb 12, 1992	No. 12	Wisconsin	W 76–61	16–4 (6–4)	Breslin Center; East Lansing, MI
Feb 15, 1992	No. 12	at No. 17 Michigan; Rivalry	W 70–59	17–4 (7–4)	Crisler Arena; Ann Arbor, MI
Feb 19, 1992	No. 11	at No. 7 Indiana	L 73–103	17–5 (7–5)	Assembly Hall; Bloomington, IN
Feb 22, 1992	No. 11	Purdue	L 62–65	18–5 (8–5)	Breslin Center; East Lansing, MI
Feb 29, 1992	No. 12	No. 8 Ohio State	L 65–78	18–6 (8–6)	Breslin Center; East Lansing, MI
Mar 5, 1992	No. 13	at Northwestern	W 72–65	19–6 (9–6)	Welsh-Ryan Arena; Evanston, IL
Mar 7, 1992	No. 13	at Illinois	L 71–80	19–7 (9–7)	Assembly Hall; Champaign, IL
Mar 11, 1992	No. 16	No. 2 Minnesota	W 66–57	20–7 (10–7)	Breslin Center; East Lansing, MI
Mar 15, 1992	No. 16	Iowa	W 64–53	21–7 (11–7)	Breslin Center; East Lansing, MI
NCAA tournament
Mar 20, 1992*	(5 MW) No. 14	vs. (12 MW) Southwest Missouri State; First Round	W 61–54	22–7	University of Dayton Arena; Dayton, OH
Mar 22, 1992*	(5 MW) No. 14	vs. (4 MW) No. 12 Cincinnati; Second Round	L 65–77	22–8	University of Dayton Arena; Dayton, OH
*Non-conference game. ^{#}Rankings from AP Poll,. (#) Tournament seedings in parentheses. All times are in Central Time; Source.

== Rankings ==
Ranking movement Legend: ██ Increase in ranking. ██ Decrease in ranking. (RV) Received votes but unranked. (NR) Not ranked.
Poll	Pre	Wk 2	Wk 3	Wk 4	Wk 5	Wk 6	Wk 7	Wk 8	Wk 9	Wk 10	Wk 11	Wk 12	Wk 13	Wk 14	Wk 15	Wk 16	Wk 17	Wk 18
AP	NR	NR	22	13	12	9	9	9	11	14	13	11	12	11	12	13	16	14

Source.

== Awards and honors ==
- Mike Peplowski – All-Big Ten First Team
- Mark Montgomery – All-Big Ten Third Team
- Shawn Respert – All-Big Ten Third Team
