= 1991–92 Memphis State Tigers men's basketball team =

American college basketball season

1991–92 Memphis State Tigers men's basketball

NCAA tournament, Elite Eight
- Conference: Great Midwest Conference
- Record: 23–11 (5–5 Great Midwest)
- Head coach: Larry Finch (6th season)
- Home arena: Pyramid Arena

1991–92 Great Midwest Conference men's basketball standings
	Conf.				Overall
Team	W		L	PCT	W		L	PCT
No. 12 Cincinnati †	8	–	2	.800	29	–	5	.853
No. 24 DePaul	8	–	2	.800	20	–	9	.690
Marquette	5	–	5	.500	16	–	13	.552
Memphis State	5	–	5	.500	23	–	11	.676
UAB	4	–	6	.400	20	–	9	.690
Saint Louis	0	–	10	.000	5	–	23	.179
† 1992 GMC tournament winner Rankings from AP Poll

The 1991–92 Memphis State Tigers men's basketball team represented Memphis State University as a member of the Great Midwest Conference during the 1991–92 NCAA Division I men's basketball season. The Tigers were led by head coach Larry Finch and played their home games at the Pyramid Arena in Memphis, Tennessee.

The Tigers received an at-large bid to the 1992 NCAA tournament as No. 6 seed in the Midwest region. After defeating No. 11 seed Pepperdine, No. 3 seed Arkansas, and No. 7 seed Georgia Tech, Memphis State fell to No. 4 seed Cincinnati for the fourth time in the Midwest Regional final. The team finished with a 23–11 record (5–5 Great Midwest).

== Roster ==
1991–92 Memphis State Tigers men's basketball team
Players
Coaches

Pos.	#	Name	Height	Weight	Year	Previous school	Hometown
G	12	Leon Mitchell	6 ft 3 in (1.91 m)	175 lb (79 kg)	So	Overton	Memphis, Tennessee
F	13	Tim Duncan	6 ft 8 in (2.03 m)	195 lb (88 kg)	Sr	Melrose	Memphis, Tennessee
G	14	Chris Haynes	6 ft 5 in (1.96 m)	179 lb (81 kg)	Fr	Briarcrest	Memphis, Tennessee
G	15	Marcus Nolan	6 ft 2 in (1.88 m)	171 lb (78 kg)	Fr	Hamilton	Memphis, Tennessee
G	20	Tony Madlock	6 ft 1 in (1.85 m)	185 lb (84 kg)	Fr	Melrose	Memphis, Tennessee
F	23	Ernest Smith	6 ft 5 in (1.96 m)	185 lb (84 kg)	Sr	Whitehaven	Memphis, Tennessee
G	25	Penny Hardaway	6 ft 7 in (2.01 m)	187 lb (85 kg)	So	Treadwell	Memphis, Tennessee
F	31	Kelvin Allen	6 ft 7 in (2.01 m)	220 lb (100 kg)	Jr	Bolivar Central	Bolivar, Tennessee
F	32	Russell Young	6 ft 5 in (1.96 m)	205 lb (93 kg)		Marianna Lee	LaGrange, Arkansas
G	35	Billy Smith	6 ft 5 in (1.96 m)	200 lb (91 kg)	Jr	East	Memphis, Tennessee
F	42	Ben Spiva	6 ft 7 in (2.01 m)	225 lb (102 kg)	Sr	Christian Brothers	Memphis, Tennessee
F	50	David Vaughn	6 ft 9 in (2.06 m)	232 lb (105 kg)	Fr	Whites Creek	Whites Creek, Tennessee
C	51	Todd Mundt	7 ft 0 in (2.13 m)	225 lb (102 kg)	So	Central Merry	Jackson, Tennessee
F	55	Anthony Douglas	6 ft 7 in (2.01 m)	255 lb (116 kg)	Jr	East	Memphis, Tennessee

Head coach

- Larry Finch (Memphis)

Assistant coach(es)

Legend

- (C) Team captain
- (S) Suspended
- (I) Ineligible
- (W) Walk-on
- Injured
- Current redshirt

Roster
Last update: May 16, 2020

== Schedule and results ==
Date time, TV	Rank^{#}	Opponent^{#}	Result	Record	Site city, state
Regular season
Nov 29, 1991		No. 20 DePaul	L 89–92 ^{OT}	0–1 (0–1)	Pyramid Arena; Memphis, Tennessee
Dec 3, 1991*		Murray State	W 78–54	1–1	Pyramid Arena; Memphis, Tennessee
Dec 14, 1991*		Tennessee	L 64–65	1–2	Pyramid Arena; Memphis, Tennessee
Dec 16, 1991*		Southwestern Louisiana	W 105–97	2–2	Pyramid Arena; Memphis, Tennessee
Dec 19, 1991*		Minnesota	W 65–62	3–2	Pyramid Arena; Memphis, Tennessee
Dec 23, 1991*		Jackson State	W 87–73	4–2	Pyramid Arena; Memphis, Tennessee
Dec 27, 1991*		vs. Saint Joseph's; ECAC Holiday Festival	W 77–60	5–2	Madison Square Garden; New York, New York
Dec 28, 1991*		at No. 18 St. John's; ECAC Holiday Festival	L 54–75	5–3	Madison Square Garden; New York, New York
Jan 4, 1992*		at UAB	W 67–63	6–3 (1–1)	UAB Arena; Birmingham, Alabama
Jan 8, 1992*		No. 12 Missouri	W 89–78	7–3	Pyramid Arena; Memphis, Tennessee
Jan 11, 1992		at DePaul	L 80–88	7–4 (1–2)	Rosemont Horizon; Rosemont, Illinois
Jan 15, 1992*		Texas Southern	W 71–53	8–4	Pyramid Arena; Memphis, Tennessee
Jan 18, 1992		at Cincinnati; Rivalry	L 66–75	8–5 (1–3)	Fifth Third Arena; Cincinnati, Ohio
Jan 20, 1992*		at Southern Miss	L 59–67	8–6	Reed Green Coliseum; Hattiesburg, Mississippi
Jan 25, 1992		Marquette	W 59–55	9–6 (2–3)	Pyramid Arena; Memphis, Tennessee
Jan 29, 1992*		at Vanderbilt	W 72–70 ^{OT}	10–6	Memorial Gymnasium; Nashville, Tennessee
Feb 1, 1992		Saint Louis	W 77–64	11–6 (3–3)	Pyramid Arena; Memphis, Tennessee
Feb 4, 1992*		at Southwestern Louisiana	W 77–76	12–6	Cajundome; Lafayette, Louisiana
Feb 8, 1992*		No. 5 Arkansas	W 92–88	13–6	Pyramid Arena; Memphis, Tennessee
Feb 13, 1992*		Temple	L 63–65	13–7	Pyramid Arena; Memphis, Tennessee
Feb 16, 1992*		Southern Miss	W 80–61	14–7	Pyramid Arena; Memphis, Tennessee
Feb 20, 1992		at Saint Louis	W 75–73 ^{OT}	15–7 (4–3)	St. Louis Arena; St. Louis, Missouri
Feb 22, 1992		UAB	W 63–58	16–7 (5–3)	Pyramid Arena; Memphis, Tennessee
Feb 25, 1992*		VCU	W 85–58	17–7	Pyramid Arena; Memphis, Tennessee
Feb 29, 1992		at Marquette	L 67–82	17–8 (5–4)	Bradley Center; Milwaukee, Wisconsin
Mar 4, 1992*		at No. 21 Tulane	W 68–67	18–8	Avron B. Fogelman Arena; New Orleans, Louisiana
Mar 7, 1992		No. 14 Cincinnati; Rivalry	L 59–69	18–9 (5–5)	Pyramid Arena; Memphis, Tennessee
Great Midwest Conference Tournament
Mar 12, 1992*		vs. UAB; Quarterfinal	W 79–67	19–9	Chicago Stadium; Chicago, Illinois
Mar 13, 1992*		vs. No. 19 DePaul; Semifinal	W 95–75	20–9	Chicago Stadium; Chicago, Illinois
Mar 14, 1992*		vs. No. 12 Cincinnati; Championship	L 63–75	20–10	Chicago Stadium; Chicago, Illinois
NCAA Tournament
Mar 19, 1992*	(6 MW)	vs. (11 MW) Pepperdine; First round	W 80–70	21–10	Bradley Center; Milwaukee, Wisconsin
Mar 21, 1992*	(6 MW)	vs. (3 MW) No. 9 Arkansas; Second Round	W 82–80	22–10	Bradley Center; Milwaukee, Wisconsin
Mar 27, 1992*	(6 MW)	vs. (7 MW) Georgia Tech; Midwest Regional semifinal – Sweet Sixteen	W 83–79 ^{OT}	23–10	Kemper Arena; Kansas City, Missouri
Mar 29, 1992*	(6 MW)	vs. (4 MW) No. 12 Cincinnati; Midwest Regional final – Elite Eight	L 57–88	23–11	Kemper Arena; Kansas City, Missouri
*Non-conference game. ^{#}Rankings from AP Poll. (#) Tournament seedings in parentheses. W=West. All times are in Eastern Time.

== Awards and honors ==
- Penny Hardaway – GMC Player of the Year
