= 1991–92 Indiana Hoosiers men's basketball team =

American college basketball season

1991–92 Indiana Hoosiers men's basketball

NCAA men's Division I tournament, Final Four
- Conference: Big Ten Conference

Ranking
- Coaches: No. 4
- AP: No. 5
- Record: 27–7 (14–4 Big Ten)
- Head coach: Bobby Knight (21st season)
- Assistant coaches: Dan Dakich (7th season); Norm Ellenberger; Ron Felling
- Captains: Eric Anderson; Jamal Meeks
- Home arena: Assembly Hall

1991–92 Big Ten Conference men's basketball standings
	Conf.				Overall
Team	W		L	PCT	W		L	PCT
No. 3 Ohio State	15	–	3	.833	26	–	6	.813
No. 5 Indiana	14	–	4	.778	27	–	7	.794
No. 15 Michigan	11	–	7	.611	24	–	9	.727
No. 14 Michigan State	11	–	7	.611	22	–	8	.733
Iowa	10	–	8	.556	19	–	11	.633
Purdue	8	–	10	.444	18	–	15	.545
Minnesota	8	–	10	.444	16	–	16	.500
Illinois	7	–	11	.389	13	–	15	.464
Wisconsin	4	–	14	.222	13	–	18	.419
Northwestern	2	–	16	.111	9	–	19	.321
Rankings from AP Poll

The 1991–92 Indiana Hoosiers men's basketball team represented Indiana University. Their head coach was Bobby Knight, who was in his 21st year. The team played its home games in Assembly Hall in Bloomington, Indiana, and was a member of the Big Ten Conference.

The Hoosiers finished the regular season with an overall record of 27–7 and a conference record of 14–4, finishing 2nd in the Big Ten Conference. The Hoosiers were invited to participate in the 1992 NCAA tournament as a #2 seed, where they advanced to the Final Four.

== Roster ==
No.	Name	Position	Ht.	Year	Hometown
20	Greg Graham	G	6–4	Jr.	Indianapolis, Indiana
21	Chris Reynolds	G	6–1	Jr.	Peoria, Illinois
22	Damon Bailey	G	6–3	So.	Bedford, Indiana
23	Jamal Meeks	G	6–1	Sr.	Freeport, Illinois
24	Matt Nover	F/C	6–8	Jr.	Chesterton, Indiana
25	Pat Knight	G	6–6	RS So.	Bloomington, Indiana
30	Todd Leary	G	6–3	So.	Indianapolis, Indiana
32	Eric Anderson	F/C	6–9	Sr.	Chicago, Illinois
33	Pat Graham	G	6–5	RS Jr.	Floyds Knobs, Indiana
34	Brian Evans	F	6–8	RS Fr.	Terre Haute, Indiana
40	Calbert Cheaney	F	6–7	Jr.	Evansville, Indiana
44	Alan Henderson	F	6–9	Fr.	Indianapolis, Indiana
50	Todd Lindeman	C	7–1	Fr.	Channing, Michigan

== Schedule/results ==
Date time, TV	Rank^{#}	Opponent^{#}	Result	Record	Site city, state
Regular season
11/15/1991*	No. 2	vs. No. 11 UCLA; Hall of Fame Game	L 72–87	0–1	Springfield Civic Center; Springfield, Massachusetts
11/30/1991*	No. 10	Butler	W 97–73	1–1	Assembly Hall; Bloomington, Indiana
12/3/1991*	No. 9	Notre Dame	W 78–46	2–1	Assembly Hall; Bloomington, Indiana
12/7/1991*	No. 9	vs. No. 14 Kentucky; Indiana–Kentucky rivalry	L 74–76	2–2	Hoosier Dome; Indianapolis
12/10/1991*	No. 13	Vanderbilt	W 88–51	3–2	Assembly Hall; Bloomington, Indiana
12/13/1991*	No. 13	Boston University; Indiana Classic	W 88–47	4–2	Assembly Hall; Bloomington, Indiana
12/14/1991*	No. 13	Central Michigan; Indiana Classic	W 99–52	5–2	Assembly Hall; Bloomington, Indiana
12/21/1991*	No. 14	at No. 10 St. John's	W 82–77	6–2	Madison Square Garden; New York City
12/27/1991*	No. 10	vs. Texas Tech; Hoosier Classic	W 86–69	7–2	Market Square Arena; Indianapolis
12/28/1991*	No. 10	vs. Indiana State; Hoosier Classic	W 94–44	8–2	Market Square Arena; Indianapolis
1/4/1992*	No. 10	at Cincinnati	W 81–60	9–2	Myrl H. Shoemaker Center; Cincinnati
1/9/1992	No. 10	Minnesota	W 96–50	10–2 (1–0)	Assembly Hall; Bloomington
1/11/1992	No. 10	at Wisconsin	W 79–63	11–2 (2–0)	Wisconsin Field House; Madison, Wisconsin
1/14/1992	No. 5	No. 4 Ohio State	W 91–83	12–2 (3–0)	Assembly Hall; Bloomington, Indiana
1/18/1992	No. 5	at Northwestern	W 96–62	13–2 (4–0)	Welsh-Ryan Arena; Evanston, Illinois
1/21/1992	No. 4	No. 16 Michigan	W 89–74	14–2 (5–0)	Assembly Hall; Bloomington, Indiana
1/28/1992	No. 4	Purdue; Rivalry	W 106–65	15–2 (6–0)	Assembly Hall; Bloomington, Indiana
2/1/1992	No. 4	at Michigan State	L 60–76	15–3 (6–1)	Breslin Center; East Lansing, Michigan
2/4/1992	No. 6	at Illinois; Rivalry	W 76–65	16–3 (7–1)	Assembly Hall; Champaign, Illinois
2/9/1992	No. 6	Iowa	W 81–66	17–3 (8–1)	Assembly Hall; Bloomington, Indiana
2/12/1992	No. 4	at Minnesota	L 67–71	17–4 (8–2)	Williams Arena; Minneapolis
2/15/1992	No. 4	Northwestern	W 91–60	18–4 (9–2)	Assembly Hall; Bloomington, Indiana
2/19/1992	No. 7	Michigan State	W 103–73	19–4 (10–2)	Assembly Hall; Bloomington, Indiana
2/23/1992	No. 7	at No. 6 Ohio State	W 86–80	20–4 (11–2)	St. John Arena; Columbus, Ohio
3/1/1992	No. 2	Illinois; Rivalry	W 76–70	21–4 (12–2)	Assembly Hall; Bloomington, Indiana
3/4/1992	No. 2	at Iowa	W 64–60	22–4 (13–2)	Carver–Hawkeye Arena; Iowa City, Iowa
3/8/1992	No. 2	at No. 18 Michigan	L 60–68	22–5 (13–3)	Crisler Arena; Ann Arbor, Michigan
3/12/1992	No. 4	Wisconsin	W 66–41	23–5 (14–3)	Assembly Hall; Bloomington, Indiana
3/15/1992	No. 4	at Purdue; Rivalry	L 59–61	23–6 (14–4)	Mackey Arena; West Lafayette, Indiana
NCAA tournament
3/19/1992*	No. 5 (2)	vs. No. (15) Eastern Illinois; First Round	W 94–55	24–6 (14–4)	BSU Pavilion; Boise, Idaho
3/21/1992*	No. 5 (2)	vs. No. 25 (7) LSU; Second Round	W 89–79	25–6 (14–4)	BSU Pavilion; Boise, Idaho
3/26/1992*	(2) No. 5	vs. (3) No. 20 Florida State; Sweet Sixteen	W 85–74	26–6 (14–4)	University Arena; Albuquerque, New Mexico
3/28/1992*	No. 5 (2)	vs. No. 4 (1) UCLA; Elite Eight	W 106–79	27–6 (14–4)	University Arena; Albuquerque, New Mexico
4/4/1992*	No. 5 (2)	vs. No. 1 (1) Duke; Final Four	L 78–81	27–7 (14–4)	Hubert H. Humphrey Metrodome; Minneapolis
*Non-conference game. ^{#}Rankings from AP Poll. (#) Tournament seedings in parentheses.
