= Jalen Rose =

American basketball player (born 1973)

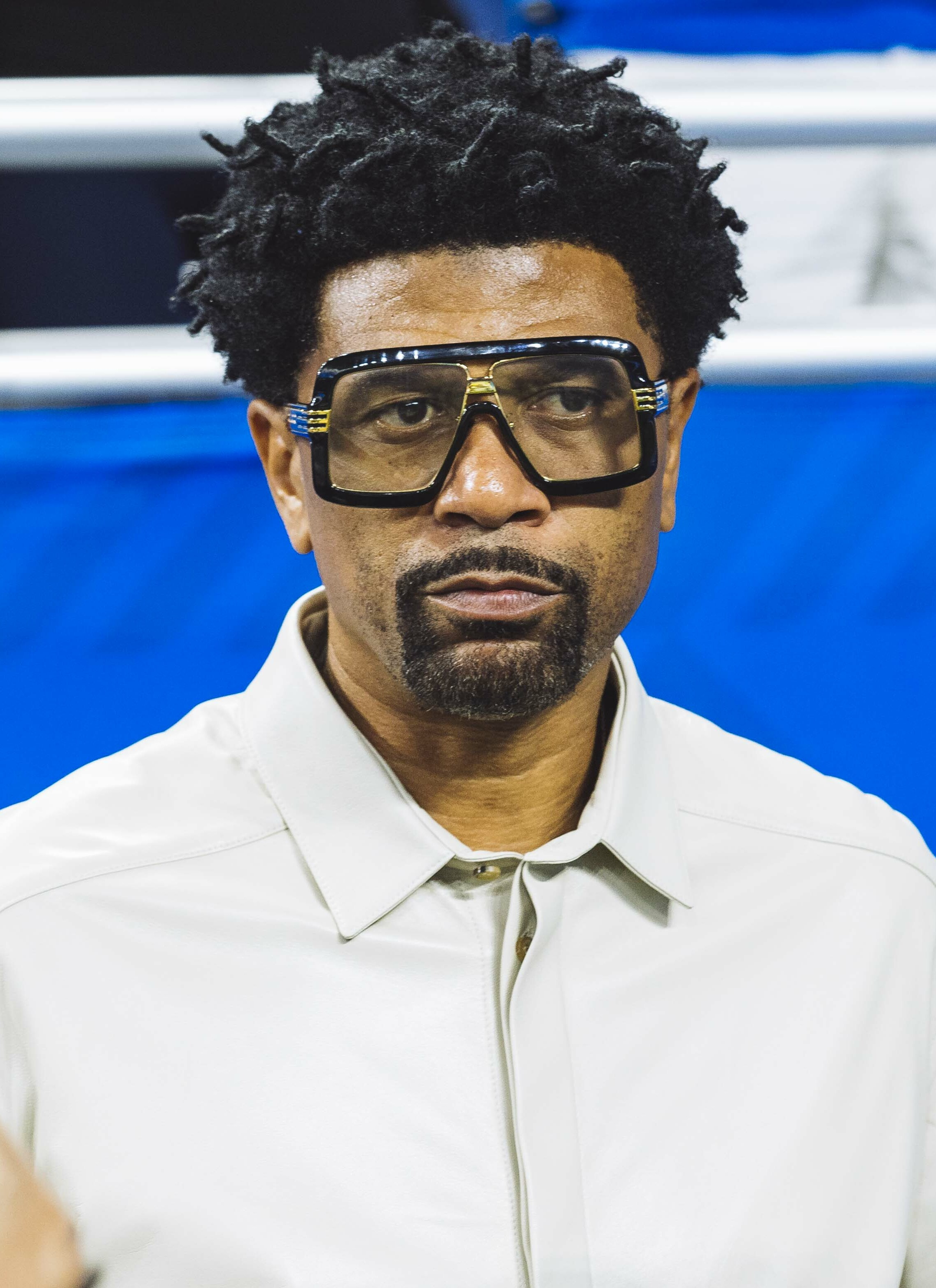
- Rose in 2022

Personal information
- Born: January 30, 1973 (age 53) Detroit, Michigan, U.S.
- Listed height: 6 ft 8 in (2.03 m)
- Listed weight: 215 lb (98 kg)

Career information
- High school: Southwestern (Detroit, Michigan)
- College: Michigan (1991–1994)
- NBA draft: 1994: 1st round, 13th overall pick
- Drafted by: Denver Nuggets
- Playing career: 1994–2007
- Position: Small forward / shooting guard
- Number: 5, 8

Career history
- 1994–1996: Denver Nuggets
- 1996–2002: Indiana Pacers
- 2002–2003: Chicago Bulls
- 2003–2006: Toronto Raptors
- 2006: New York Knicks
- 2006–2007: Phoenix Suns

Career highlights
- NBA Most Improved Player (2000); NBA All-Rookie Second Team (1995); Consensus second-team All-American (1994); First-team All-Big Ten (1994); McDonald's All-American (1991); Second-team Parade All-American (1991); Fourth-team Parade All-American (1990)

Career NBA statistics
- Points: 13,222 (14.3 ppg)
- Rebounds: 3,193 (3.5 rpg)
- Assists: 3,527 (3.8 apg)
- Stats at NBA.com
- Stats at Basketball Reference

Jalen Anthony Rose (born January 30, 1973) is an American sports analyst and former professional basketball player. In college, he was a member of the University of Michigan Wolverines' "Fab Five" (along with Chris Webber, Juwan Howard, Jimmy King, and Ray Jackson) that reached the 1992 and 1993 NCAA Men's Division I Basketball Championship games as both freshmen and sophomores.

Rose played in the National Basketball Association (NBA) as a small forward for six teams, most notably alongside Reggie Miller on the Indiana Pacers team that made three consecutive Eastern Conference finals and reached the 2000 NBA Finals. He retired in 2007 with a career average of 14.3 points, 3.8 assists and 3.5 rebounds per game.

Rose was a sports analyst for ABC and ESPN. He was an analyst on NBA Countdown and Get Up!, and he co-hosted the ESPN talk show, Jalen & Jacoby, with co-host David Jacoby until late 2022. He is also the founder of the Jalen Rose Leadership Academy and the author of The New York Times best-seller Got to Give the People What They Want and producer of the ESPN documentary The Fab Five.

== Early life and family ==
Rose was born in Detroit, Michigan, to Jeanne Rose and Jimmy Walker, who was a No. 1 overall draft pick in the NBA who became a two-time NBA All-Star. Jeanne Rose created Jalen's name by combining his father's name, James, and his uncle's name, Leonard. As a result of Rose's prominence in the NCAA and NBA, Jalen became one of the most popular names for African-American boys born in the 1990s and early 2000s. A number of notable American athletes who began play in the 2010s are named Jalen, after Rose, including Jalen Hurts, Jaylen Brown, Jalen Brunson, Jalen Green, Jalen Johnson, Jalen Suggs, and Jaylen Waddle. In 2021, there were 32 players with some variation of the name Jalen on rosters in the NBA, NFL, and other North American professional sports, with an additional 80 who played men's college basketball.

Jalen never met his father in person, although they eventually spoke several times over the phone. Walker died in July 2007 of lung cancer.

Rose was a star athlete at Southwestern High School in Detroit. His teammates included future NBA players Voshon Lenard and Howard Eisley. He appeared in the documentary film Hoop Dreams at a high school All-Americans camp.

== College career ==
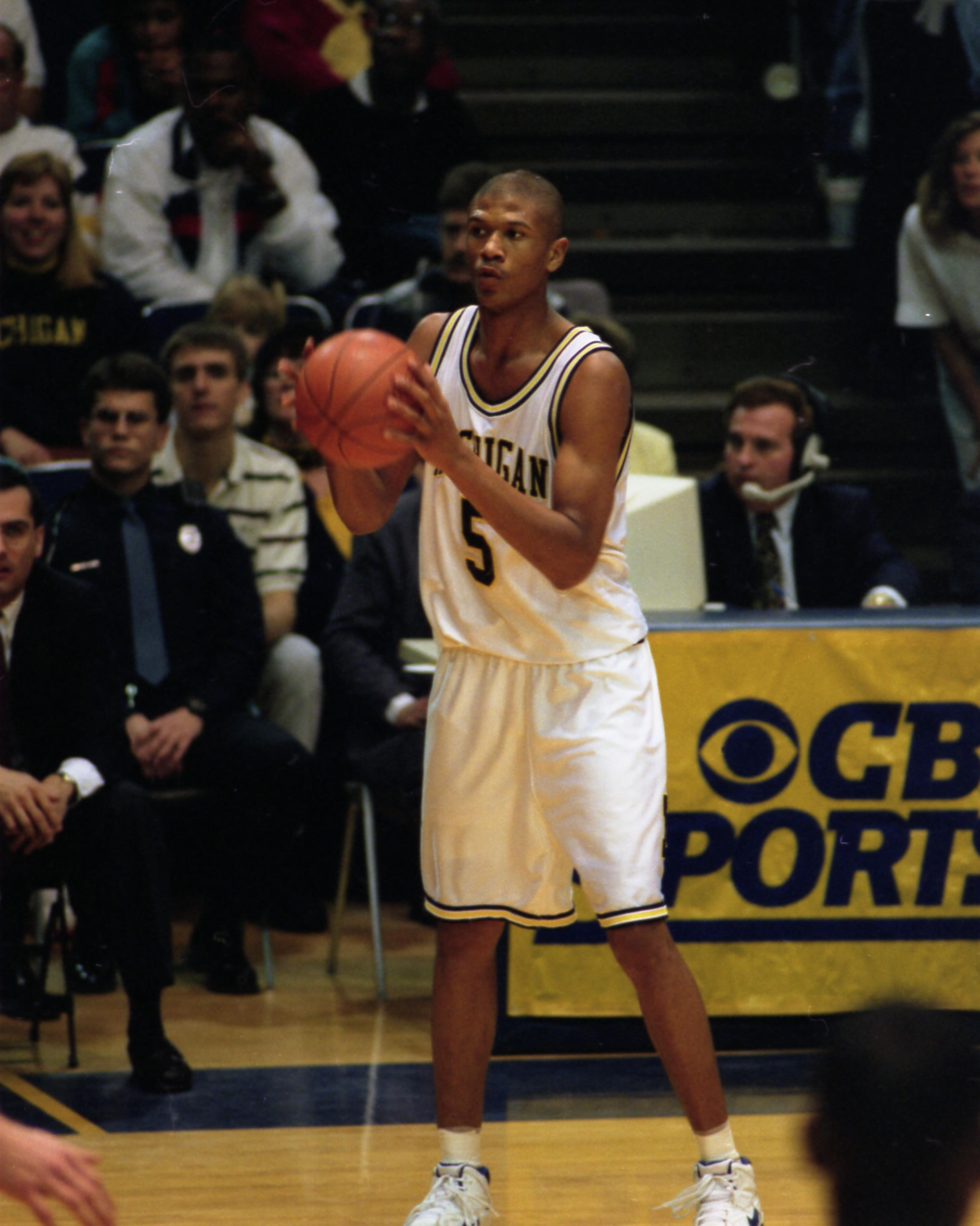
Rose while playing with the Michigan Wolverines men's basketball team

Rose attended the University of Michigan where the Wolverines reached two NCAA Finals games in 1992 and 1993, finishing as national runners up both times. Rose was a part of Wolverines coach Steve Fisher's legendary 1991 recruiting class, dubbed the "Fab Five." He led the Fab Five in scoring his freshman year, averaging 17.6 points per game, and set the school freshman scoring record with 597 total points. While he did not win an NCAA title, he racked up over 1700 points, 400 rebounds, 400 assists, and 100 steals. At 6 ft 8 in and playing as a versatile point guard, some reporters started comparing Rose to his childhood idol Magic Johnson. Of the players called before the grand jury (Robert Traylor, Webber, Rose, Maurice Taylor, and Louis Bullock) in the University of Michigan basketball scandal, Rose was the only one not listed as having received large amounts of money. When questioned by the grand jury, though, Rose confessed to having received money from Martin. He said that it was only occasional gifts of a couple hundred dollars in spending money.

== NBA career ==
=== Denver Nuggets (1994–1996) ===
Rose was selected 13th overall by the Denver Nuggets in the 1994 NBA draft. He averaged 8.2 points and 2.0 rebounds per game in 81 games (37 starts) for his rookie season. He averaged ten points and 2.7 rebounds in 80 games (37 starts) for his second and last season in Denver.

=== Indiana Pacers (1996–2002) ===
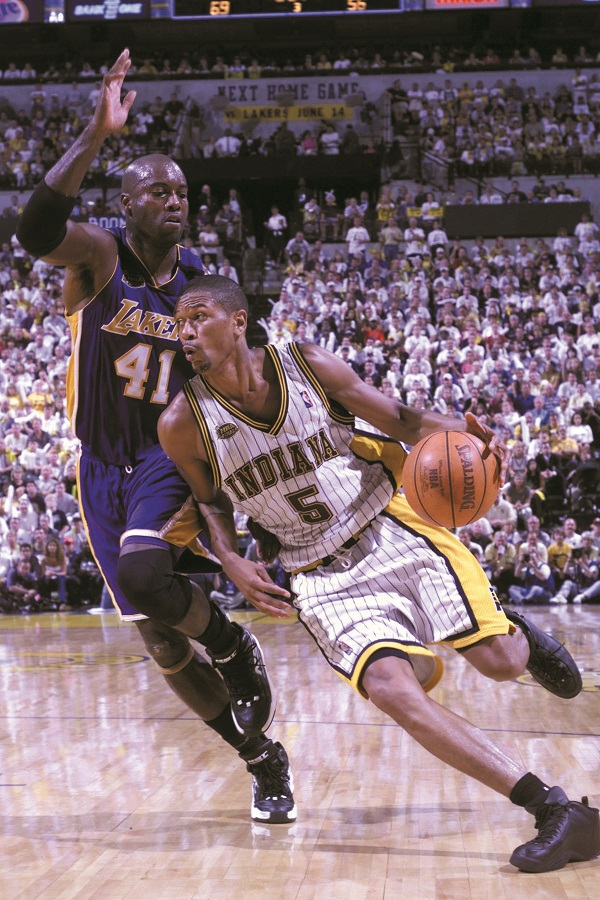
Rose as a member of the Indiana Pacers during the 2000 NBA Finals

After two years with Denver, Rose was traded to the Indiana Pacers, along with Reggie Williams and a future first round draft pick, for Mark Jackson, Ricky Pierce, and a 1st round draft pick.

Despite his successes in Indiana, he was not readily accepted early on. Rose frequently logged DNPCDs (Did Not Play – Coach's Decision) under Coach Larry Brown. Rose also often spoke out about the fact he was being used as a backup two-guard and small forward over his preference, which was point guard. It was not until Larry Bird took over coaching duties did Rose finally begin to blossom, eventually realizing he was most effective at small forward.

As a member of the Indiana Pacers, Rose helped the team get back on its feet after a disastrous 1996–97 season and make it to three consecutive Eastern Conference Finals appearances. Rose became the first player in eight years other than Reggie Miller to lead the Pacers in scoring in the 1999–2000 season when he averaged 18.2 points per game for the eventual Eastern Conference Champions, winning the NBA Most Improved Player Award in the process, the first time in Pacers history. During the 2000 NBA playoffs, Rose scored 40 points during Indiana’s Eastern Conference Semifinals Game 1 win over the Philadelphia 76ers. After winning that series, and helping lead his team all the way to the 2000 NBA Finals, Rose went on to average 25 points per game in the six game series, including a 32-point effort in a game five win. However, the Pacers lost the series to the Los Angeles Lakers. This playoff series is also remembered for Rose intentionally placing his foot underneath Kobe Bryant in game 2, while Bryant was landing back to the ground after shooting a jump shot, in an effort to cause Bryant injury (which Rose later admitted to intentionally doing). Bryant would miss Game 3 of the series due to an injury after landing on Rose's foot.

=== Chicago Bulls (2002–2003) ===
During the 2001–02 season, Rose was traded to the Chicago Bulls along with Travis Best, Norman Richardson, and a future second round draft pick in exchange for Brad Miller, Ron Mercer, Ron Artest and Kevin Ollie. On March 16, 2002, Rose scored a career-high 44 points and hit a game-winning shot during 114–112 overtime win against the Houston Rockets.

=== Toronto Raptors (2003–2006) ===
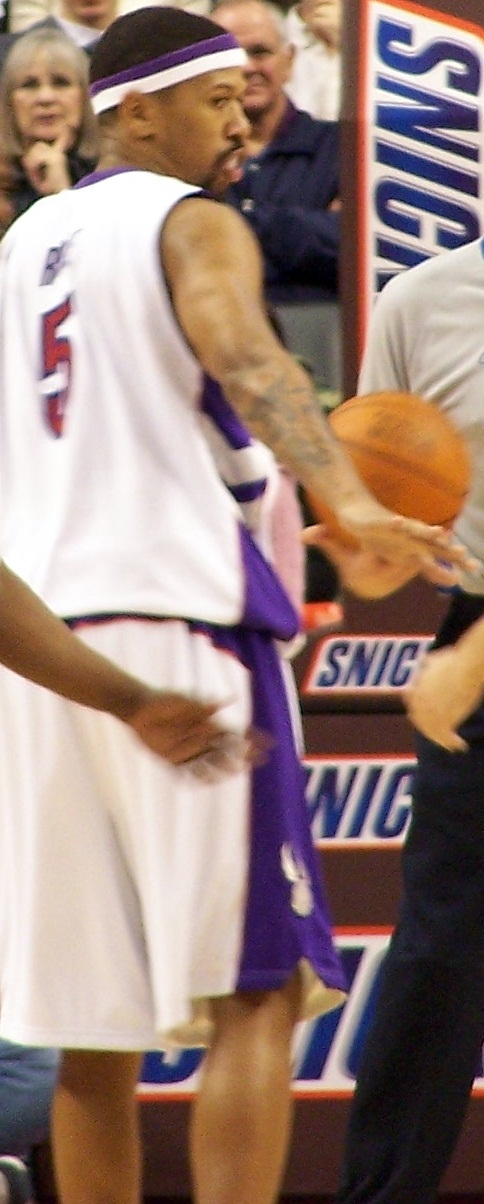
Rose with the Toronto Raptors

After 16 games in the 2003–04 season, Rose was traded to the Toronto Raptors, along with power forwards Donyell Marshall and Lonny Baxter, for Antonio Davis, Jerome Williams, and Chris Jefferies. On January 22, 2006, Kobe Bryant scored 81 points while being defended by Rose, the third-greatest scoring performance in NBA history (behind Wilt Chamberlain's 100 point game and Bam Adebayo's 83 point game).

=== New York Knicks (2006) ===
On February 3, 2006, midway through the 2005–06 season, Rose was traded, along with a first-round draft pick, and an undisclosed sum of cash (believed to be around $3 million), to the New York Knicks for Antonio Davis, where he was reunited with Larry Brown, his coach for one year with the Indiana Pacers. The motivation behind this trade was apparently to free up cap space (Rose earned close to $16 million a year) and to allow the Raptors to acquire an experienced center who could relieve some of Chris Bosh's rebounding duties. Rose's final game and contribution for the Raptors was a home win against the Sacramento Kings, where he scored the winning basket in overtime.

=== Phoenix Suns (2006–2007) ===
On November 3, 2006, Rose announced he would sign with the Suns. On November 7, it was officially announced that Rose had signed a $1.5 million one-year deal with Phoenix.

=== Retirement ===
Rose retired from the NBA in 2007 with a career average of 14.3 points, 3.8 assists and 3.5 rebounds per game.

== Post-NBA career and broadcasting ==
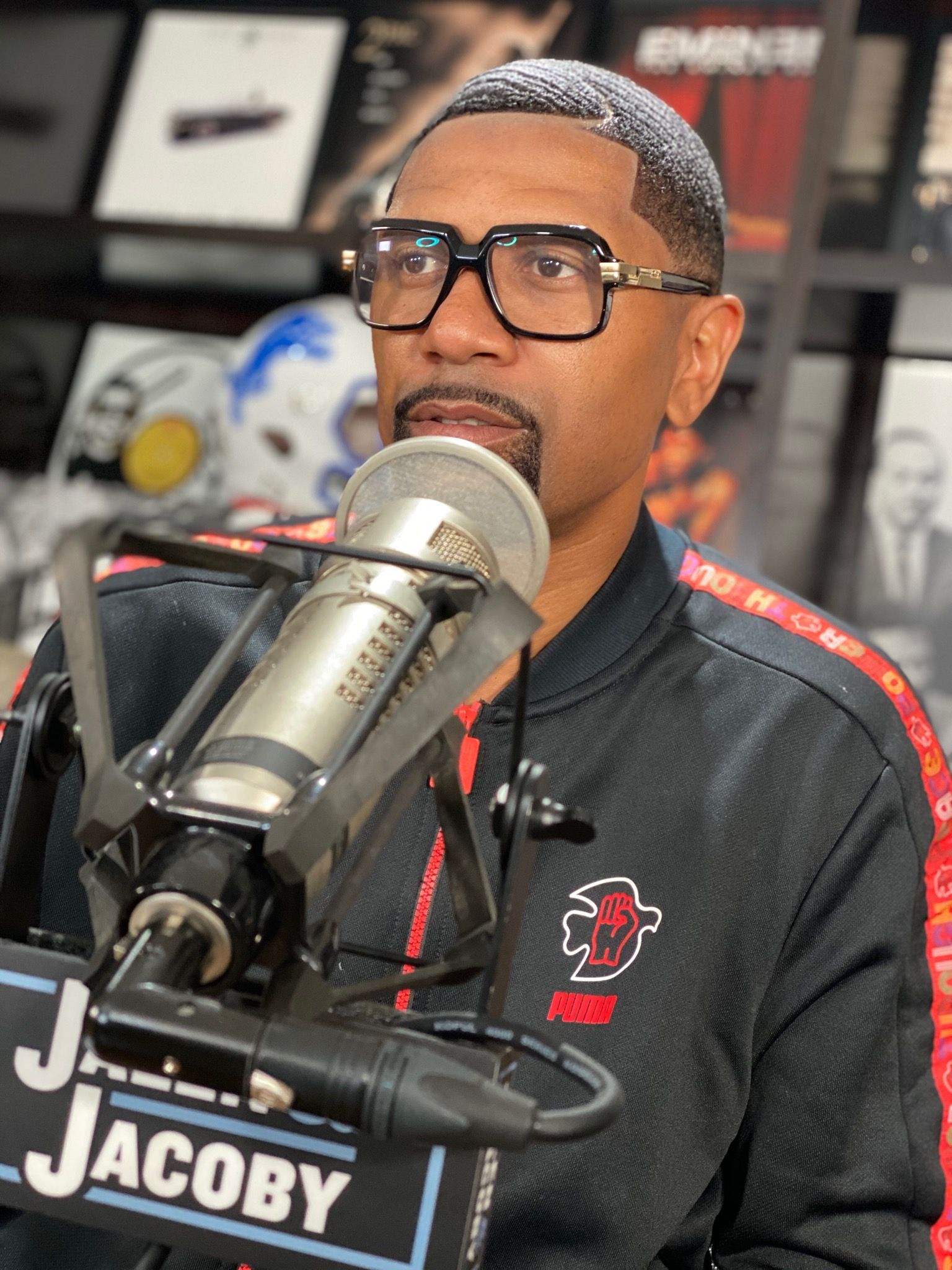
Rose on the set of Jalen & Jacoby

Rose worked as a Sideline Reporter for the 2006 NBA Playoffs for TNT. From his retirement in 2007 until 2023, Rose has worked at ABC/ESPN, first as an analyst on SportsCenter and in 2012 he became one of the hosts for NBA Countdown. Rose has also worked on ESPN's Grantland.

Rose is the owner of Three Tier Entertainment, an independent, Los Angeles-based management and production company. Created in 2007, Three Tier Entertainment develops television and film projects and also manages talent including directors, actors and screenplay writers. In 2011, he produced the ESPN documentary The Fab Five. The Fab Five earned a 2.1 rating to become ESPNʼs highest rated documentary according to the Nielsen Company. The documentary even sparked a controversy that led to a series of media exchanges between members of the press, Michigan Wolverines men's basketball players, and Duke Blue Devils men's basketball players.

In 2015, Rose released Got to Give the People What They Want, a book about his personal life story. It is a New York Times Bestseller and made the list of Michigan Notable Books from 2016. He co-hosted Jalen & Jacoby, a national US sports radio show on ESPN Radio, with David Jacoby, until late 2022. Starting in April 2018, Rose was a guest analyst of Get Up!, a three-hour morning sports talk show on ESPN.

Rose was one of the three regular panelists on ABC's revival of the game show To Tell the Truth in 2016. The other two were Betty White and Nene Leakes. The regular panelists were dropped after the first season, but he still made occasional appearances as a panelist on the program.

Rose also has a multi-platform partnership with the New York Post where he hosts a podcast and weekly column under the name Renaissance Man.

Rose was laid off by ESPN on June 30, 2023, in a round of cost cuts of public-facing commentators.

After taking a year off from broadcasting, Rose joined NBC Sports as an analyst for their college basketball coverage. Rose also joined TNT Sports and has made guest appearances on Inside the NBA, as well as appearing regularly on NBA TV. TNT, along with CBS Sports, also added Rose to their commentator roster for March Madness in 2025. Rose joined the #7 team with Lisa Byington, Robbie Hummel, and AJ Ross, as well as the studio team with Adam Lefkoe, Seth Davis, and Jay Wright in Atlanta for the First Four. He will also be part of CBS's pregame coverage for the Final Four.

== NBA career statistics ==
Legend
GP	Games played	GS	Games started	MPG	Minutes per game
FG%	Field goal percentage	3P%	3-point field goal percentage	FT%	Free throw percentage
RPG	Rebounds per game	APG	Assists per game	SPG	Steals per game
BPG	Blocks per game	PPG	Points per game	**Bold**	Career high
*	Led the league

=== Regular season ===
Year	Team	GP	GS	MPG	FG%	3P%	FT%	RPG	APG	SPG	BPG	PPG
1994–95	Denver	81	37	22.2	.454	.316	.739	2.7	4.8	.8	.3	8.2
1995–96	Denver	80	37	26.7	**.480**	.296	.690	3.3	**6.2**	.7	.5	10.0
1996–97	Indiana	66	6	18.0	.456	.292	.750	1.8	2.3	.9	.3	7.3
1997–98	Indiana	82*	0	20.8	.478	.342	.728	2.4	1.9	.7	.2	9.4
1998–99	Indiana	49	1	25.3	.403	.262	.791	3.1	1.9	1.0	.3	11.1
1999–00	Indiana	80	80	37.2	.471	.393	.827	4.8	4.0	**1.1**	**.6**	18.2
2000–01	Indiana	72	72	**40.9**	.457	.339	.828	**5.0**	6.0	.9	**.6**	20.5
2001–02	Indiana	**53***	**53***	36.5	.444	.356	.839	4.7	3.7	.8	.5	18.5
2001–02	Chicago	**30***	**30***	40.5	.470	.370	.839	4.1	5.3	**1.1**	.5	**23.8**
2002–03	Chicago	82	82*	**40.9**	.406	.370	.854	4.3	4.8	.9	.3	22.1
2003–04	Chicago	16	14	33.1	.375	.426	.765	4.0	3.5	.8	.3	13.3
2003–04	Toronto	50	50	39.4	.410	.311	.822	4.0	5.5	.8	.4	16.2
2004–05	Toronto	81	65	33.5	.455	.394	.854	3.4	2.6	.8	.1	18.5
2005–06	Toronto	46	22	26.9	.404	.270	.765	2.8	2.5	.4	.2	12.0
2005–06	New York	26	23	28.7	.460	**.491**	.812	3.2	2.6	.4	.1	12.7
2006–07	Phoenix	29	0	8.5	.442	.447	**.917**	3.6	2.5	.2	.1	3.7
Career		923	572	30.3	.443	.355	.801	3.5	3.8	.8	.3	14.3

=== Playoffs ===
Year	Team	GP	GS	MPG	FG%	3P%	FT%	RPG	APG	SPG	BPG	PPG
1995	Denver	3	3	33.0	.464	.250	.600	3.7	**6.0**	1.0	**.7**	10.0
1998	Indiana	15	0	19.5	**.480**	.375	.741	1.8	1.9	.7	.4	8.1
1999	Indiana	13	0	27.3	.442	.348	.824	2.4	2.5	1.0	.4	12.2
2000	Indiana	**24**	**23**	**41.9**	.437	**.429**	.805	4.4	3.4	.7	.5	**20.8**
2001	Indiana	4	4	41.0	.380	.313	**1.000**	**4.5**	2.8	**1.5**	.3	18.0
2007	Phoenix	1	0	9.0	.250	.000	.000	1.0	2.0	.0	.0	2.0
Career		59	30	31.9	.438	.385	.801	3.2	2.9	.8	.4	14.6

== Player profile ==
A left-handed player, Rose was known to have a smooth and versatile offensive game, and was particularly gifted as a scorer from the perimeter or the post. Rose was used throughout his career at three different positions. He began his career as a point guard for the Denver Nuggets and became a shooting guard/small forward for the Indiana Pacers. He then returned to the point guard position briefly with the Toronto Raptors. However, during his career he was most effective as a small forward or swingman. Rose was also a good passer, especially for his height, and Indiana often employed him as a point forward. Not known for his defense, Rose's best moment defensively came during the 1997–1998 season, when Rose emerged as a defensive stopper on Michael Jordan in the Eastern Conference Finals, though the Bulls pulled out the series in seven games. Rose has sometimes been regarded as a team leader, particularly under head coach Larry Bird, though he reportedly was a disruptive force in the Pacers' locker room during his feud with the coach at that time Isiah Thomas, after Thomas cut former Fab Five teammate Jimmy King on the final day to do so before the 2000–2001 season.

While in Toronto, Rose also frequently clashed with Raptors coach Sam Mitchell, who benched a struggling Jalen early in the 2005–06 season in favor of rookie Joey Graham.

In the following months, Rose increased his Player Efficiency Rating more than three points (to 13.7) while averaging 12.1 points, 2.5 assists, and 2.8 rebounds per game. However, he only shot 40.4% from the field and 27% from three-point range (including a 51.4 true shooting percentage) through 46 games.

In 2003, Rose was honored with the Professional Basketball Writers Association Magic Johnson Award. Jalen was inducted into the Detroit High School Hall of Fame in 2013 and Michigan Basketball Hall of Fame in 2017. In 2019, Rose was inducted into the American Basketball Hall of Fame in his hometown of Detroit.

== Philanthropy ==
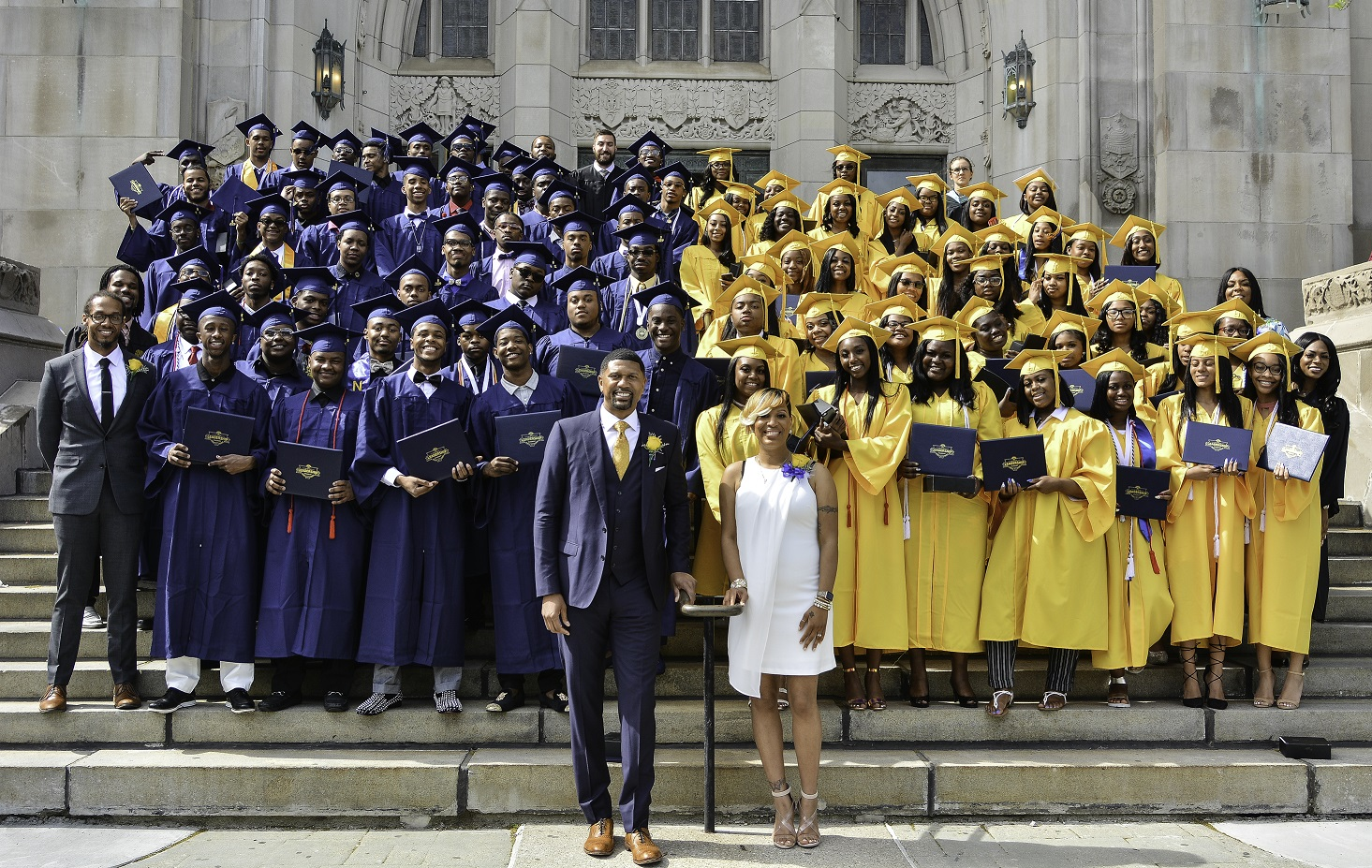
Rose with graduates of the Jalen Rose Leadership Academy

In 2000, Rose established the Jalen Rose Foundation/Charitable Fund to create life-changing opportunities for underserved youth through the development of unique programs and the distribution of grants to qualified nonprofit organizations. Grants focus on education and sports and are distributed in Jalen's hometown of Detroit and in other communities in need.

Rose established the Jalen Rose Leadership Academy (JRLA) in 2011. The academy is an open enrollment, tuition free, public charter high school on the Northwest side of Detroit. The academy serves over 400 ninth through twelfth grade students and graduated its inaugural class in June 2015. Rose serves as the President of the Board of Directors.

The Detroit News has recognized Rose with the Michiganian of the Year Award in recognition of his excellence, courage and philanthropy to uplift the metropolitan area and Michigan. In 2016, he was awarded the 11th Annual National Civil Rights Museum Sports Legacy Award for his contributions to civil and human rights, and for laying the foundation for future leaders through his career in sports in the spirit of Dr. King. Rose won the award for establishing the Jalen Rose Foundation, which creates opportunities for underprivileged youth. In addition, the Naismith Memorial Basketball Hall of Fame awarded Rose the 2016 Mannie Jackson – Basketball's Human Spirit Award and the 2025 Ice Cube Impact Award.

== Personal life ==
In 2005, Rose earned a Bachelor of Science in Management Studies from the University of Maryland University College. He received an honorary doctorate of Humane Letters from the University of Michigan in 2026. He remains an active supporter of his alma mater, the University of Michigan, and was seen rooting for their men's basketball team during the 2006 NIT Final Four with fellow ex-Wolverine, Maurice Taylor. He also was seen in Atlanta, Georgia for the Wolverines' 2013 NCAA National Title game.

In July 2018, Rose married ESPN personality Molly Qerim in a private ceremony in a public park. In 2021, the pair divorced. He stated that their marriage broke down after she moved to Connecticut. Qerim briefly went by Molly Qerim Rose on air. In August 2026 Rose married again to aspiring R&B singer GiGi in a private desert elopement. GiGi, a Detroit native signed to Warner Music Group, stated in an April 2025 interview that her relationship with Rose "has ups and downs" and that she has a daughter from a previous relationship.
