= Sky Sport (New Zealand) =

Group of New Zealand sports television channels

- Country: New Zealand

Programming
- Languages: English, Māori (special events)
- Picture format: 1080i (HDTV) UHD 16:9

Ownership
- Owner: Sky Network Television

History
- Launched: 18 May 1990

Links
- Website: Official Site

Availability

Streaming media
- Sky Go: skygo.co.nz
- Sky Sport Now: skysportnow.co.nz

Sky Sport is a group of sports-oriented television channels operated by New Zealand's satellite pay-TV company, Sky.

== History ==
Sky Sport 1 is the original Sky Television sport channel in New Zealand. It was first introduced in 1990 as Sky Sport on the Sky UHF service. When Sky Sport began it operated between the hours of noon and around midnight, and occasionally screened live sports events outside these hours. By July 1991, Sky Sport commenced 24-hour transmission with a direct feed of ESPN at certain times during the week.

Test transmissions began on 23 March 1990 with a test pattern and were followed on 6 April with free-to-view coverage of Sydney rugby league, used to test possible subscriptions. Broadcasts began on 18 May.

A sister channel, Sky Sport 2 was launched in 1997 when Sky introduced a nationwide analogue direct broadcasting via satellite (DBS) service, followed by a third channel, Sky Sport 3 in 2003 and Sky Sport 4 in 2013.

On 1 August 2019, Sky launched five more Sky Sport channels, numbered from 5 to 9. Additionally all the channels were re-aligned to be sport-specific, and a Sky Sport News channel was launched providing the latest news and updates from across all sports. However, due to the COVID-19 pandemic in New Zealand, the Sky Sport News channel was rebranded as Sky Sport Select, a combination of sports news and general sporting coverage.

== Channels ==
Ten main channels comprise the Sky Sport service:

Channel	Name	Content
050	Sky Sport Select	A mix of international sporting news supplied by Fox Sports News and general sport coverage.
051	Sky Sport 1	Rugby union coverage and a mix of other sports.
052	Sky Sport 2	General sport coverage.
053	Sky Sport 3	Cricket coverage and a mix of other sports.
054	Sky Sport 4	Rugby league coverage and a mix of other sports.
055	Sky Sport 5	Motorsport coverage and a mix of other sports. Includes content from Red Bull TV.
056	Sky Sport 6	Golf coverage, 24 hours a day.
057	Sky Sport 7	Association football coverage, 24 hours a day. Previously known as Sky Sport 7 beIN Sports from 2019 to 2023.
058	Sky Sport Premier League	Premier League coverage, 24 hours a day. Includes coverage of all matches and Premier League-related content (e.g. match previews, highlights, documentaries).
059	Sky Sport 9	General sport coverage.

All Sky Sport channels are broadcast in 1080i high definition.

=== Pop-up channels ===
Additional Sky Sport channels are launched in order to broadcast major events such as the Australian Tennis Open and the Olympic Games.

== Outside Broadcasting ==
Sky owned Outside Broadcasting Limited from 2010 to 2021, providing outside broadcast facilities for Sky Sport coverage with eight broadcast trucks and fly away kits. These traveled the length of New Zealand and overseas to cover events for Sky Sport. These trucks were also contracted out to other television networks like TVNZ and Māori Television. On 12 August 2020, Sky announced it had sold Outside Broadcasting to NEP New Zealand, part of American production company NEP Group. As part of the transaction, NEP will be Sky's outsourced technical production partner in New Zealand until at least 2030. The sale was cleared by the Commerce Commission on 5 February 2021.

== Sky Sport Now ==
Sky Sport Now logo

On 14 August 2019, Sky launched Sky Sport Now, featuring online live streams for all 10 Sky Sport channels, highlights, on demand, match statistics and points tables. Three passes are available for purchase: a week pass, a month pass and a 12-month Pass. Pay-Per-View events can be purchased separately when they become available. Sky Sport Now is available via internet browsers as well as on iOS, Android and PlayStation 4 devices.

On 27 October 2020, Sky announced that its Sky Sport Now streaming service would be bundled with Spark Sport for a NZ$49.99 monthly subscription from 16 November 2020 onwards.

== Sports ==
=== Association football ===
==== Football ====
From 2019 until 2023, matches aired on beIN Sports platforms were also available on Sky Sport due to a four-year partnership contract.

Leagues

- A-League Men
- A-League Women
- Premier League

Domestic cups

- English FA Cup
- FA Community Shield
- Women's FA Cup
- FA Women's Community Shield

National teams

- AFC Asian Cup
- OFC Nations Cup
- Australia men's national football team
- England men's national football team
- United States men's national football team

Former

- All Whites (Men's national team)
- Football Ferns (Women's national team)

International club competitions

- AFC Champions League Elite
- AFC Champions League Two
- AFC Challenge League
- OFC Champions League

International matches

- UEFA Nations League
- European Championship qualifying
- World Cup Qualifying
- Friendlies and other International Matches

Former

- New Zealand Men's National League
- New Zealand Women's National League
- New Zealand Football Championship
- La Liga
- La Liga 2
- Serie A
- Bundesliga
- 2. Bundesliga
- Ligue 1
- Ligue 2
- EFL Cup
- EFL Trophy
- Copa Del Rey
- Supercopa España
- DFB Pokal
- Franz Beckenbauer Supercup
- Coupe De France
- Coupe De La Ligue
- Trophee Des Champions
- Portuguese Cup
- Supertaca
- Copa Del Rey
- DFB-Supercup Frauen
- Coupe De France Women
- Chatham Cup
- Kate Sheppard Cup
- Charity Cup
- UEFA Champions League
- UEFA Europa League
- UEFA Conference League
- UEFA Super Cup
- UEFA Youth League
- Copa Libertadores
- Copa Sudamericana
- CONMEBOL Recopa
- FIFA Club World Cup (2019–2022)
- FIFA World Cups (through 2022)
  - Men's:
    - FIFA World Cup
    - FIFA U-20 World Cup
    - FIFA U-17 World Cup
  - Women's:
    - FIFA Women's World Cup
    - FIFA U-20 Women's World Cup
    - FIFA U-17 Women's World Cup
- UEFA
  - UEFA Euro 2020
- Copa America
- Africa Cup of Nations

==== Beach Soccer ====
International tournaments

- FIFA Beach Soccer World Cup (2019 and 2021)

==== Futsal ====
International tournaments

- FIFA Futsal World Cup

=== Athletics ===
- IAAF Golden League
- World Athletics

=== Australian rules ===
- Australian Football League: One live game per week, plus weekly highlights.

=== Basketball ===
- National Basketball League

=== Cricket ===
- Overseas cricket:
  - International fixtures - Cricket Australia, BCCI (India), Cricket South Africa, Cricket West Indies and Pakistan Cricket Board.
  - Australian domestic competitions: Sheffield Shield, One-Day Cup, Women's National Cricket League, Big Bash League and Women's Big Bash League.
  - Indian Premier League, Caribbean Premier League, Super50 Cup and Pakistan Super League.
- ICC
  - All major ICC events: Men's Cricket World Cup, Women's Cricket World Cup, Men's T20 World Cup, Women's T20 World Cup, World Test Championship and Under-19 Cricket World Cup.

=== Cycling ===
- Tour de France

=== Golf ===
- The Open Championship
- Ryder Cup
- European Tour
- PGA Tour
- U.S. Open
- U.S. Masters
- World Golf Championships
- World Cup
- New Zealand Open
- LPGA Tour
- Evian Masters

=== Motor racing ===
- Formula One
- IndyCar Series
- Formula E
- Australian Supercars Championship (Includes support categories)
- Dunlop Super2 Series
- Superbike World Championship
- Supersprint NZ Championship
- D1NZ

=== Multi-discipline events ===
- Commonwealth Games (2022 and 2026)
- Summer Olympics (2020, free coverage is sublicensed with TVNZ)
- Winter Olympics

=== Netball ===
- ANZ Premiership
- 2019 Netball World Cup
- International Netball
- National Netball League
- Suncorp Super Netball

=== Rowing ===
- World Rowing Championships
- Rowing World Cup

=== Rugby league ===
- National Rugby League: Live coverage of all games
- New South Wales Cup: All Warriors home games live, plus any games available from Fox Sports
- State of Origin
- Super League
- Rugby League Challenge Cup
- Four Nations

=== Rugby union ===
- All Blacks, Black Ferns and Maori All Blacks
- The Rugby Championship: Live coverage of all games
- Super Rugby: Live coverage of all games
- Rugby World Cup
- World Rugby Sevens Series
- College 1st XV coverage: Live and delayed coverage and highlights of televised matches during the week.
- National Provincial Championship: Live coverage of all games
- Heartland Championship
- Farah Palmer Cup: Live coverage of all games
- National Sevens
- Six Nations Championship
- Premiership Rugby
- Top 14
- United Rugby Championship
- Super Rugby Pacific
- Investec Champions Cup & EPCR Challenge Cup
- Currie Cup

=== Swimming ===
- FINA World Aquatics Championships

=== Tennis ===
- Australian Open
- French Open
- ASB Classic
- Davis Cup
- Fed Cup

=== Through ESPN channels ===
==== American Football ====
- National Football League (includes NFL draft, Sunday Night Football, Monday Night Football, Thursday Night Football, three Sunday afternoon games, all NFL Network games, Thanksgiving Day, NFL RedZone, Pro Bowl plus all the Playoff games and Super Bowl)
- College football (includes regular season, Heisman Trophy, College Football Playoff and College Football Championship Game)
- United Football League

==== Baseball ====
- Major League Baseball (includes Sunday, Monday, Tuesday, Wednesday, Thursday, Friday and Saturday Night Baseball, MLB Strike Zone, Home Run Derby, All-Star Game, all playoff games and World Series)
- World Baseball Classic
- College baseball
- Little League World Series

==== Basketball ====
- National Basketball Association (includes NBA draft, NBA All-Star Weekend, Wednesday and some Friday games (mostly doubleheaders), Saturday games (including all ABC games), ESPN/ABC games on Sundays, all NBC/Peacock games, playoff games and NBA Finals)
- FIBA Basketball World Cup
- FIBA Women's Basketball World Cup
- FIBA Asia Cup
- FIBA Women's Asia Cup
- National Basketball League
- Women's National Basketball League
- Women's National Basketball Association
- College basketball
- NBA Summer League
- NBA G League
- Athletes Unlimited Basketball

==== Cricket ====
- Australia Tour of West Indies (men and women)
- New Zealand Tour of West Indies
- Pakistan Super League

==== Ice Hockey ====
- National Hockey League
- Australian Ice Hockey League

==== Mixed Martial Arts ====
- ONE Championship

==== Multi-Sport Events ====
- Special Olympics World Games

==== Padel ====
- Hexagon Cup

==== Poker ====
- World Series of Poker

==== Professional wrestling ====
- All Elite Wrestling (includes AEW Dynamite

==== Soccer ====
- UEFA Women's Champions League
- Eredivisie
- Campeonato Brasileiro Série A
- CONCACAF Gold Cup

==== Tennis ====
- Wimbledon Championships
- U.S. Open
- ATP Finals (only in New Zealand)
- ATP 1000
- ATP 500

==== Other programming ====
- NCAA events
- ESPN Films
- World's Strongest Man
- ESPY Award

==== News and talk shows ====
- Around the Horn
- College Gameday
- E:60
- First Take
- Highly Questionable
- Jalen & Jacoby
- Outside the Lines
- Pardon the Interruption Australia
- SportsCenter
- SportsCenter Australia
- The Pat McAfee show

== Former logos ==
2003–2008 (used for Sky Sport 1.)

2008–2017

2017–2019
