= John Doleva =

President and CEO of the Naismith Memorial Basketball Hall of Fame

John Doleva is the president and CEO of the Naismith Memorial Basketball Hall of Fame.

He became COO in 2000 and the president and CEO in 2001, and has helped the Hall prevent many financial issues and has gotten them out of crisis multiple times.
