= Ice Cube Impact Award =

Annual American basketball award

- Awarded for: those who use basketball as a platform for good works in their own communities
- Country: United States
- Presented by: Naismith Memorial Basketball Hall of Fame

History
- First award: 2024
- Most recent: Jalen Rose, 2025
- Website: Official website

The Ice Cube Impact Award is an annual Naismith Memorial Basketball Hall of Fame award in the United States intended to honor those who use basketball as a platform for good works in their own communities.

The award, named in honor of rapper Ice Cube, was established and first awarded in 2024.

Ice Cube himself will chair the selection committee for future award nominations. Accompanying the establishment of this award, the Ice Cube Impact Award Exhibit was debuted.

== Winners ==
Name	Year	Ref
Ice Cube	2024	
Jalen Rose	2025	
