= Jalen Rose Leadership Academy =

Charter high school in Detroit, Michigan

Coordinates: 42.4418°N 83.1947°W

- 15000 Trojan St; Detroit, Michigan 48235; United States

Information
- School type: Charter school
- Motto: Enter a Learner, Exit a Leader
- Opened: 2011
- School district: Independent
- President: Jalen Rose
- Principal: Jazmine Allen
- Grades: 9–12
- Gender: co-educational
- Enrollment: 420
- Campus type: Suburban
- Colors: Navy and Gold
- Athletics: 6 Athletic teams
- Athletics conference: Michigan High School Athletic Association
- Mascot: Jaguar
- Nickname: Jaguars
- Website: www.jrladetroit.com

Jalen Rose Leadership Academy (JRLA) is an open enrollment charter high school in northwest Detroit, Michigan. It was cofounded by Jalen Rose. It was reported in 2014 as being in partnership with the University of Detroit Mercy (UDM). The contract document on the school website in February 2024 indicates that it has been authorized by Central Michigan University since (at least) 2016

== History ==
The school opened in fall 2011. The purpose was to reduce dropout rates and increase test scores. Rose had earlier offered university scholarships but took additional measures by opening the school.

Because of Rose's celebrity status, the school received over $1 million in donations by September 2012. Several foundations have given funds to the school, and legendary Detroit Pistons point guard Isiah Thomas pledged to give $100,000. Rose himself gave a six figure donation to have the school established. Chastity Pratt Dawsey of the Detroit Free Press wrote that "Rose's celebrity and connections differentiate this new school from others". An employee of Chrysler Corporation recommended that the company adopt the school, so the company did so. The company's Jeep division gives year-round financial support. By September 2012 Jeep had given $100,000 in scholarships to students.

120 students in the ninth grade were the first students. The organization Operation Graduation had spent $450,000 to purchase the school campus and about $1 million to renovate it. The students entering the school were about two to three grade levels behind the standard.

Dawsey stated that in the 2011-2012 school year, the first school year, there was "high" turnover of employees, a curriculum that "didn't meet expectations", an "inadequate" building, a "tight" financial situation, and low ACT scores at the beginning and end of the school year. The goal is to, by graduation, have the average ACT score be 21 out of 36. As of September 2012 the average was 13. After one year of education at JRLA, the students' test scores did not change. All of the teachers in the 2012-2013 school year were new. Some of the previous teachers chose to move to public schools to get higher pay, and the school dismissed some teachers. The remaining teachers outright quit.

The Detroit Free Press frequently visited the school in the year 2012. In the summer of that year the school sent teachers to a conference about Spencer Kagan's small group learning model in Battle Creek, Michigan. As of that year the school had plans to introduce methods by Lorraine Monroe.

On July 1, 2013, American Promise Schools assumed management responsibilities of the JRLA. In September 2013 the school serves grades 9 through 11 and had over 300 students. That month, Tom Gores and his wife Holly donated $250,000 to the school.

== Operations ==
Dawsey wrote that "Parents are attracted to the new school's small class sizes, safe atmosphere, longer school year and caring staff." Classes operate from 8 AM to 4:30 PM, and once each month students take classes on a Saturday. The school year lasts for 11 months. The school, as of 2012, only recesses in the month of August. Each weekday the school offers tutoring from 4:30-5:00 PM. Students are tested by the school every Thursday.

As of September 2012 the maximum class size was 20 students. Originally English language and mathematics classes had maximum sizes of 10 students, and because of that salaries of staff made up over half of the school's budget. For the 2012-2014 school year the class sizes increased to 20 to save funds while the class sizes were smaller than those in Detroit Public Schools. As a result, the school had $1.6 million in savings in its state aid budget.

Dawsey wrote "The school aims to create a safe learning environment without the use of metal detectors."

Once every month, Rose travels from Los Angeles, where he is resident, to Detroit.

== Curriculum ==
As of the 2012-2013 school year, the school offered music production, Spanish, Mandarin Chinese, art, sports management, and web design. Its physical education class includes golf, tennis, and outdoor survival skills. All of the classes were newly introduced during that school year.

The original curriculum was designed by a Canadian researcher. When the school opened in 2011 its curriculum had heavy involvement on the internet with most classes having internet-based projects, known as e-labs. Accordingly, each student was assigned a laptop. The grading scale had A, B, and Incomplete.

Many laptops required repairs by the middle of the school year. For the final trimester the school decreased the number of technology lessons since it did not have the funds to fix the computers. The school hired a technology contractor, with his assignment effective the 2012-2013 school year. The annual budget for the contractor is $35,000 as of 2012.

The e.labs were not aligned with the Common Core, and by the end of the first year, the school determined the e.labs were not rigorous enough and therefore stopped using it. The new curriculum has laptops used in research and technology-related projects, as well as daily homework. Schoolwide every two students were to have one laptop. In addition, five desktop computers were to be assigned per core class. These classes are English, mathematics, science, and social studies.

The school began using weekly testing data, a common set of teaching strategies for all teachers, daily teacher meetings, and weekly staff training. It also switched to the traditional A-F grading scale.

In 2015 the first senior class of Rose Academy graduated. In June of that year the school announced that it had a new graduation requirement: each graduating student must be accepted to at least two post-secondary educational institutions.

== Campus ==
As of 2012 the campus is in the Vandenberg Elementary School campus, a former Detroit Public Schools (DPS) elementary school. The campus is surrounded by Comstock Park and is in proximity to the intersection of the John C. Lodge Freeway and 8 Mile Road. The surrounding neighborhood is Rose's childhood neighborhood.

JRLA has blue and yellow furniture to match the colors of the University of Michigan. As of 2012 the science classrooms had no sinks, so students cleaned science tools in restrooms. As of that year the dance classes were held in a former office. At the time the school used a "cafenasium," a 40-foot (12 m) by 60-foot (18 m) gymnasium as its cafeteria facility. Every lunchtime students moved tables and chairs to the cafenasium. Dawsey wrote "It's hard to find an intact building in Detroit that will suit a high school, so new schools often have to make facilities adjustments to meet their needs." She added that "the building woes do not deter parents."

In the fall of 2012 there were plans to begin construction on a 30,000-square-foot (2,800 m^{2}) addition to the campus. This addition will include a new gymnasium and additional classrooms. Operation Graduation had taken out a $5 million loan to have this addition built.

== Athletics ==
The jaguar is the school mascot. As of 2012 the only sport offered at the school was basketball. There were no home games due to the small size of the gymnasium facility. As of 2012 the gym had no showers.

== See also ==
- List of public school academy districts in Michigan
