= David Jacoby (sportscaster) =

American television sports anchor

David Jacoby is a podcaster with The Ringer and former television ESPN producer and host.

Jacoby was with ESPN from 1999 to 2022. Jacoby joined ESPN as a development executive before becoming an executive producer at ESPN's Grantland and contributed to a number of podcasts related to basketball and reality television. He was the senior producer of The Grantland Basketball Hour as well as It's The Shoes. While with Grantland, he received three Emmy nominations. He was a host on the Grantland podcast, ESPN Radio show, and then ESPN television show Jalen & Jacoby from 2011-2022. He also created and produced the 2015 feature-length documentary Son of the Congo about Serge Ibaka. Jacoby created and produced SportsNation.

In January 2022, Jacoby began hosting The Ringer Food podcast with Juliet Litman. He joined The Ringer full time in October 2024 and co-hosts The Mismatch podcast with Chris Vernon.

From August 2023 until 2024, Jacoby joined FS1 and cohosted a show with Craig Carton.

Jacoby graduated with degrees in management and marketing from the Stern School of Business at New York University in 2000.
