= Jalen & Jacoby =

Radio and television program

Jalen & Jacoby was a sports talk radio and television program that aired on ESPN, featuring ex-NBA player Jalen Rose and sportscaster David Jacoby. The show began as a radio podcast hosted by the two in 2011. The final episode of the series was on November 24, 2022, after the departure of Jacoby from the network. During its run, the television series was also known for interviewing hip-hop musicians live on air. The podcast on which the show is based was awarded an honorary Webby award in 2021.
