= Award share =

An award share is a statistic in baseball, basketball and other sports. It is usually used as part of a formula to determine if a player will likely be elected to the Hall of Fame in his particular sport. It is calculated by the number of points a player received for a particular award over the total points of all first-place votes. For example, in the 2000 NBA MVP race, Shaquille O'Neal received every first place vote but one (120 votes at ten points each), and one second place vote (seven points), and therefore his MVP award share for that season is 0.998 (1207/1210 max points). Cumulative award shares for a career are calculated by adding up all the award shares a particular player got throughout his career.

== Career leaders ==
=== Baseball MVP Award Shares ===
1. Barry Bonds (9.30)
2. Stan Musial (6.96)
3. Albert Pujols (6.91)
4. Mike Trout (6.53)
5. Ted Williams (6.43)
6. Lou Gehrig (5.98)
7. Willie Mays (5.94)
8. Mickey Mantle (5.79)
9. Hank Aaron (5.45)
10. Joe DiMaggio (5.45)

=== Cy Young Award Winner Shares ===
1. Roger Clemens (7.66)
2. Randy Johnson (6.50)
3. Justin Verlander (5.21)
4. Greg Maddux (4.92)
5. Max Scherzer (4.61)
6. Clayton Kershaw (4.58)
7. Steve Carlton (4.29)
8. Pedro Martinez (4.26)
9. Tom Seaver (3.85)
10. Jim Palmer (3.57)

=== Basketball MVP Award Shares ===
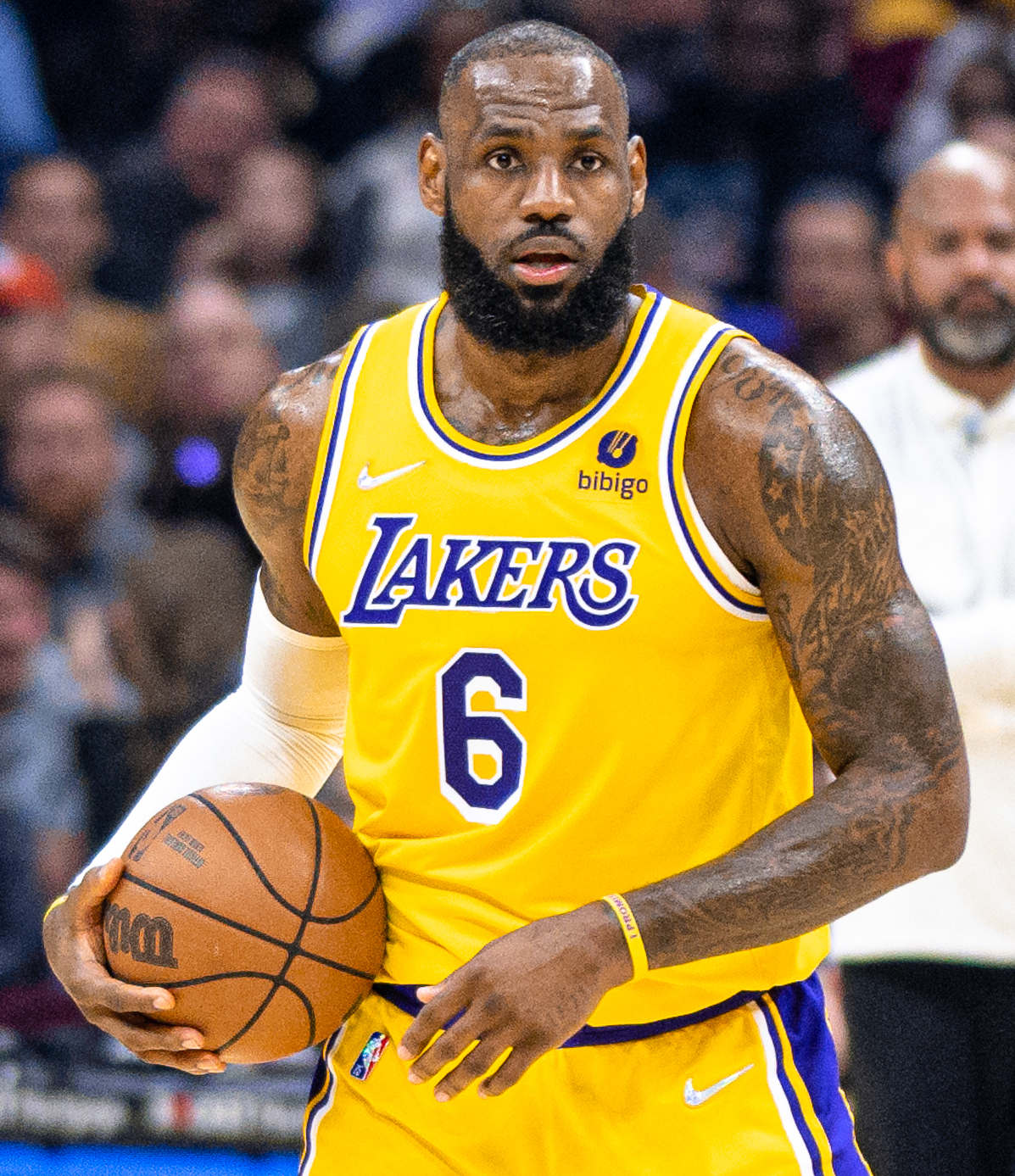
Lebron James, who won four MVP awards, has the most NBA MVP Award shares

1. LeBron James (8.831)
2. Michael Jordan (8.115)
3. Kareem Abdul-Jabbar (6.105)
4. Larry Bird (5.612)
5. Magic Johnson (5.104)
6. Nikola Jokić (5.094)
7. Bill Russell (4.852)
8. Wilt Chamberlain (4.423)
9. Shaquille O'Neal (4.380)
10. Karl Malone (4.296)

=== WNBA MVP Award Shares ===
1. Lisa Leslie (5.614)
2. Tamika Catchings (4.844)
3. A'ja Wilson (4.758)
4. Lauren Jackson (4.698)
5. Breanna Stewart (3.974)
6. Candace Parker (3.913)
7. Diana Taurasi (3.674)
8. Elena Delle Donne (3.381)
9. Tina Charles (3.375)
10. Sheryl Swoopes (3.260)
