= 1991–92 Big East Conference men's basketball season =

American college basketball season

1991–92 Big East Conference Men's Basketball Season
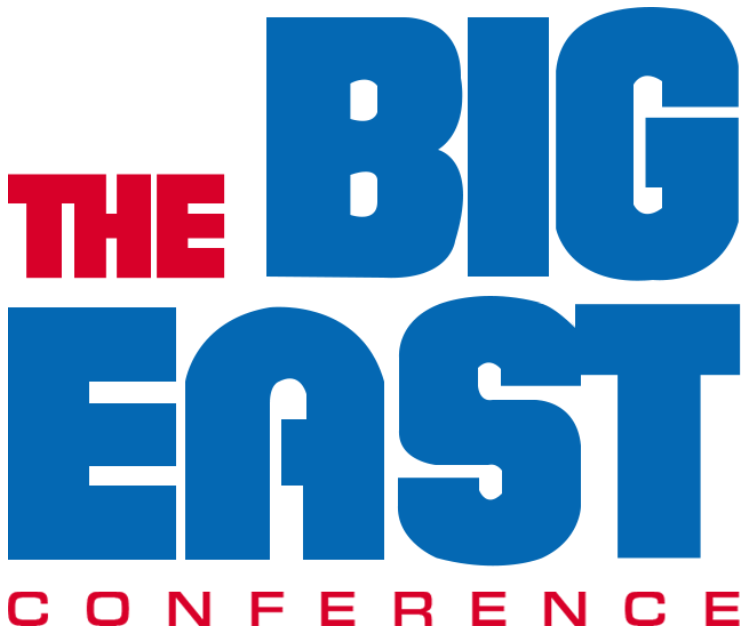
- League: NCAA Division I
- Sport: Basketball
- Duration: November 22, 1991 through March 15, 1992
- Teams: 10
- TV partner: ESPN

Regular Season
- Champion: Georgetown, St. John's, and Seton Hall (12–6)
- Season MVP: Alonzo Mourning – Georgetown

Tournament
- Champions: Syracuse
- Finals MVP: Alonzo Mourning – Georgetown

Basketball seasons
- 1990–91 1992–93

1991–92 Big East men's basketball standings
	Conf.				Overall
Team	W		L	PCT	W		L	PCT
No. 19 Seton Hall	12	–	6	.667	23	–	9	.719
No. 22 Georgetown	12	–	6	.667	22	–	10	.688
St. John's	12	–	6	.667	19	–	11	.633
Villanova	11	–	7	.611	14	–	15	.483
No. 21 Syracuse†	10	–	8	.556	22	–	10	.688
Connecticut	10	–	8	.556	20	–	10	.667
Pittsburgh	9	–	9	.500	18	–	16	.529
Boston College	7	–	11	.389	17	–	14	.548
Providence	6	–	12	.333	14	–	17	.452
Miami	1	–	17	.056	8	–	24	.250
† 1992 Big East tournament winner As of April 6, 1992; Rankings from AP Poll

The 1991–92 Big East Conference men's basketball season was the 13th in conference history, and involved its ten full-time member schools.

Georgetown, St. John's, and Seton Hall were the regular-season co-champions with an identical records of 12–6. Syracuse won the Big East tournament championship.

== Season summary & highlights ==
- The Big East expanded to 10 teams, adding Miami as a member.
- The expansion of the conference lengthened the conference regular season from 16 to 18 games.
- Georgetown, St. John's, and Seton Hall finished as the regular-season co-champions with identical records of 12–6. It was the fifth regular-season championship or co-championship for Georgetown, the fifth for St. John's, and the first for Seton Hall.
- Syracuse won its third Big East tournament championship. It was Syracuse's first victory over Georgetown in a Big East Tournament game in four tries.

== Head coaches ==
School	Coach	Season	Notes
Boston College	Jim O'Brien	6th	
Connecticut	Jim Calhoun	6th	
Georgetown	John Thompson, Jr.	20th	Big East Coach of the Year (3rd award)
Miami	Leonard Hamilton	2nd	
Pittsburgh	Paul Evans	6th	
Providence	Rick Barnes	4th	
St. John's	Lou Carnesecca	22nd	Retired April 12, 1992
Seton Hall	P. J. Carlesimo	10th	
Syracuse	Jim Boeheim	16th	
Villanova	Rollie Massimino	17th	Resigned April 1, 1992

== Rankings ==
Connecticut, Georgetown, St. John's, Seton Hall, and Syracuse were ranked in the Top 25 of the Associated Press poll for most of the season, with Connecticut peaking at No. 5. Pittsburgh also made a brief appearance in the Top 25.

1991–92 Big East Conference Weekly Rankings Key: ██ Increase in ranking. ██ Decrease in ranking.
AP Poll	Pre	11/25	12/2	12/9	12/16	12/23	12/30	1/6	1/13	1/20	1/27	2/3	2/10	2/17	2/24	3/2	3/9	Final
Boston College																		
Connecticut	15	15	12	8	7	5	5	5	8	7	6	10	18	21	24			
Georgetown	16	17	18	23	23	24	22		22					25	18	17	21	22
Miami																		
Pittsburgh		24																
Providence																		
St. John's	10	8	7	11	10	18	18	17	17	22				24	20		25	
Seton Hall	9	7	6	12	11	12	12	18	21				25	22		22	15	19
Syracuse							23	20	20	13	12	13	10	17	22	24		21
Villanova																		

== Regular-season statistical leaders ==
Scoring
Name	School	PPG
Malik Sealy	SJU	22.6
Alonzo Mourning	GU	21.3
Chris Smith	Conn	21.2
Dave Johnson	Syr	19.8
Terry Dehere	SHU	19.4

Rebounding
Name	School	RPG
Alonzo Mourning	GU	10.7
Michael Smith	Prov	10.3
Chris McNeal	Pitt	9.1
Rod Sellers	Conn	8.9
Bill Curley	BC	8.1

Assists
Name	School	APG
Sean Miller	Pitt	6.6
Jason Buchanan	SJU	6.2
Joey Brown	GU	5.4
Howard Eisely	BC	4.4
Bryan Caver	SHU	4.3

Steals
Name	School	SPG
Scott Burrell	Conn	2.5
Jerome Scott	Mia	2.4
Chris Walker	Vill	2.0
Malik Sealy	SJU	2.0
Howard Eisley	BC	2.0

Blocks
Name	School	BPG
Alonzo Mourning	GU	5.0
Donyell Marshall	Conn	2.6
Conrad McRae	Syr	2.5
Constantin Popa	Mia	2.0
Robert Werdann	SJU	1.8

Field Goals
Name	School	FG%
Alonzo Mourning	GU	.595
Bill Curley	BC	.577
Lawrence Moten	Syr	.497
Chris McNeal	Pitt	.492
Malik Sealy	SJU	.472

3-Pt Field Goals
Name	School	3FG%
Chris Smith	Conn	.420
(no other qualifiers)

Free Throws
Name	School	FT%
Sean Miller	Pitt	.873
Terry Dehere	SHU	.830
Greg Woodard	Vill	.819
Joey Brown	GU	.807
Chris Smith	Conn	.800

== Postseason ==
=== Big East tournament ===
==== Seeding ====
Seeding in the Big East tournament was based on conference record, with tiebreakers applied as necessary. Teams seeded seventh through tenth played a first-round game, and the other six teams received a bye into the quarterfinals.

The tournament's seeding was as follows: (1) Seton Hall, (2) Georgetown, (3) St. John's, (4) Villanova, (5) Syracuse, (6) Connecticut, (7) Pittsburgh, (8) Boston College, (9) Boston College, (10) Miami.

==== Bracket ====
First round March 12, 1992
8	Boston College	78
9	Providence	68
7	Pittsburgh	71
10	Miami	83

Quarterfinals; March 13, 1992
1	#15 Seton Hall	62
8	Boston College	60
4	Villanova	52
5	Syracuse	55
3	#25 St. John's	64^{OT}
6	Connecticut	59
2	#21 Georgetown	77
10	Miami	64

Semifinals; March 14, 1992
1	#15 Seton Hall	66
5	Syracuse	70
3	#25 St. John's	64
2	#21 Georgetown	68

Championship Game; March 15, 1992
5	Syracuse	56
2	#21 Georgetown	54

=== NCAA tournament ===
Five Big East teams received bids to the NCAA Tournament. St. John's lost in the first round, Connecticut, Georgetown, and Syracuse in the second round, and Seton Hall in the regional semifinals.

School	Region	Seed	Round 1	Round 2	Sweet 16
Seton Hall	East	4	13 La Salle, W 78–76	5 Missouri, W 88–71	1 Duke, L 81–68
Georgetown	West	6	11 South Florida, W 75–60	3 Florida State, L 78–68	
Syracuse	East	6	11 Princeton, W 51–43	3 UMass, L 78–68	
Connecticut	Southeast	9	8 Nebraska, W 86–65	1 Ohio State, L 78–55	
St. John's	Southeast	7	10 Tulane, L 61–57		

=== National Invitation Tournament ===
Three Big East teams received bids to the National Invitation Tournament, which did not yet have seeding. Playing in three different unnamed brackets, Villanova lost in the first round to eventual tournament champion Virginia, Boston College suffered a double-overtime loss in the second round, and Pittsburgh also lost in the second round.

School	Round 1	Round 2
Boston College	Southern Illinois, W 78–69	Rhode Island, L 81–80^{(2OT)}
Pittsburgh	Penn State, W 67–65	Florida, L 77–74
Villanova	Virginia, L 83–80	

== Awards and honors ==
=== Big East Conference ===
Player of the Year:

- * Alonzo Mourning, Georgetown, C, Sr.

Defensive Player of the Year:

- Alonzo Mourning, Georgetown, C, Sr.

Rookie of the Year:

- Lawrence Moten, Syracuse, G, Fr.

Coach of the Year:

- John Thompson Jr., Georgetown (20th season)

All-Big East First Team

- Chris Smith, Connecticut, G Sr., 5 ft 11 in (180 cm), 163 lb (74 kg), Bridgeport, Conn.
- Alonzo Mourning, Georgetown, C Sr. 6 ft 10 in (208 cm), 261 lb (118 kg), Chesapeake, Va.
- Terry Dehere, Seton Hall, G, Jr., 6 ft 2 in (188 cm), 190 lb (86 kg), Jersey City, N.J.
- Malik Sealy, St. John's, F, Sr., 6 ft 8 in (203 cm), 200 lb (91 kg), The Bronx, N.Y.
- Dave Johnson, Connecticut, F Jr., 6 ft 7 in (201 cm), 210 lb (95 kg), Morgan City, La.

All-Big East Second Team:

- Bill Curley, Boston College, F, So., 6 ft 9 in (206 cm), 220 lb (100 kg), Boston, Mass.
- Scott Burrell, Connecticut, G, Jr., 6 ft 7 in (201 cm), 218 lb (99 kg), New Haven, Conn.
- Sean Miller, Pittsburgh, G, Sr., 6 ft 2 in (188 cm), Ellwood City, Pa.
- Jerry Walker, Seton Hall, F, Jr., 6 ft 7 in (201 cm)
- Lance Miller, Villanova, F, Jr., 6 ft 7 in (201 cm), Bridgewater, N.J.

All-Big East Third Team:

- Rod Sellers, Connecticut, C, Sr., 6 ft 9 in (206 cm), 236 lb (107 kg), Florence, S.C.
- Joey Brown, Georgetown, G, So. 5 ft 10 in (178 cm), 185 lb (84 kg), Morgan City, La.
- Darren Morningstar, Pittsburgh, C Sr., 6 ft 10 in (208 cm), 325 lb (147 kg), Stevenson, Wash.
- Marques Bragg, Providence, F, Sr., 6 ft 9 in (206 cm), 270 lb (122 kg), East Orange, N.J.
- Michael Smith, Providence, F, So., 6 ft 8 in (203 cm), 230 lb (104 kg), Washington, D.C.
- Lawrence Moten, Syracuse, G, Fr., 6 ft 5 in (196 cm), 185 lb (84 kg), Washington, D.C.

Big East All-Rookie Team:

- Donyell Marshall, Connecticut, F, Fr., 6 ft 9 in (206 cm), 245 lb (111 kg), Reading, Pa.
- Irvin Church, Georgetown, G, Fr., 6 ft 1 in (185 cm), 185 lb (84 kg), Riverdale, Md.
- Orlando Antigua, Pittsburgh, F, Fr. 6 ft 7 in (201 cm), 209 lb (95 kg), The Bronx, N.Y.
- Michael Smith, Providence, F, So., 6 ft 8 in (203 cm), 230 lb (104 kg), Washington, D.C.
- Lawrence Moten, Syracuse, G, Fr., 6 ft 5 in (196 cm), 185 lb (84 kg), Washington, D.C.

=== All-Americans ===
The following players were selected to the 1992 Associated Press All-America teams.

Consensus All-America First Team:

- Alonzo Mourning, Georgetown, Key Stats: 21.3 ppg, 10.7 rpg, 5.0 bpg, 59.5 FG%, 681 points

Consensus All-America Second Team:

- Malik Sealy, St. John's, Key Stats: 22.6 ppg, 6.8 rpg, 2.0 spg, 47.2 FG%, 30.2 3P%, 679 points

First Team All-America:

- Alonzo Mourning, Georgetown, Key Stats: 21.3 ppg, 10.7 rpg, 5.0 bpg, 59.5 FG%, 681 points

Third Team All-America:

- Malik Sealy, St. John's, Key Stats: 22.6 ppg, 6.8 rpg, 2.0 spg, 47.2 FG%, 30.2 3P%, 679 points

AP Honorable Mention

- Terry Dehere, Seton Hall
- Chris Smith, Connecticut

== See also ==
- 1991–92 NCAA Division I men's basketball season
- 1991–92 Connecticut Huskies men's basketball team
- 1991–92 Georgetown Hoyas men's basketball team
- 1991–92 Pittsburgh Panthers men's basketball team
- 1991–92 St. John's Redmen basketball team
- 1991–92 Seton Hall Pirates men's basketball team
- 1991–92 Syracuse Orangemen basketball team
