= 1991–92 NCAA Division I men's basketball season =

Basketball season

- Preseason AP No. 1: Duke Blue Devils
- NCAA Tournament: 1992
- Tournament dates: March 19 – April 6, 1992
- National Championship: Hubert H. Humphrey Metrodome; Minneapolis, Minnesota
- NCAA Champions: Duke Blue Devils
- Other champions: Virginia Cavaliers (NIT)
- Player of the Year (Naismith, Wooden): Christian Laettner, Duke Blue Devils

The 1991–92 NCAA Division I men's basketball season began in November 1991 and ended with the Final Four at the Hubert H. Humphrey Metrodome in Minneapolis, Minnesota on April 6, 1992.

== Season headlines ==
- Michigan became the first program to land four McDonald's All-Americans – Chris Webber, Juwan Howard, Jalen Rose, and Jimmy King – in a single recruiting class. Joined by Ray Jackson, the group of freshmen was known as the Fab Five.
- The Great Midwest Conference began play, with six original members.
- The 1992 East Regional Final, a 104–103 Duke win over Kentucky in overtime, is considered by many to be the greatest NCAA tournament game (or college basketball game overall) of all time.
- Duke held the #1 ranking in both polls for the entire season, played in its fifth consecutive Final Four, and became the first repeat national champion since the 1972–73 UCLA Bruins.

== Season outlook ==
=== Pre-season polls ===
The top 25 from the AP Poll and Coaches Poll during the pre-season.

Associated Press
Ranking	Team
1	Duke
2	Indiana
3	Arkansas
4	Kentucky
5	Arizona
6	LSU
7	Ohio State
8	North Carolina
9	Seton Hall
10	St. John's
11	UCLA
12	Kansas
13	Oklahoma State
14	Utah
15	Connecticut
16	Georgetown
17	Alabama
18	DePaul
19	Oklahoma
20	Michigan
21	Iowa
22	Wake Forest
23	Georgia Tech
24	Arizona State
25	Louisville

UPI Coaches
Ranking	Team
1	Duke
2	Indiana
3	Arkansas
4	North Carolina
5	Ohio State
6	LSU
7	Arizona
8	Kentucky
9	Seton Hall
10	St. John's
11	UCLA
12	Oklahoma State
13	Kansas
14	Georgetown
15	Connecticut
16	Alabama
17	Utah
18	Wake Forest
19	Michigan
20	Iowa
21	Oklahoma
22	Arizona State
23	DePaul
24	Georgia Tech
25	Texas

== Conference membership changes ==
School	Former conference	New conference
Alabama–Birmingham (UAB) Blazers	Sun Belt Conference	Great Midwest Conference
Arkansas Razorbacks	Southwest Conference	Southeastern Conference
Arkansas-Little Rock Trojans	Trans America Athletic Conference	Sun Belt Conference
Arkansas State Red Wolves	American South Conference	Sun Belt Conference
Augusta State Jaguars	Big South Conference	Peach Belt Conference (D-II)
Brooklyn Bulldogs	NCAA Division I independent	East Coast Conference
Buffalo Bulls	NCAA Division III independent	East Coast Conference
Central Florida (UCF) Knights	American South Conference	Sun Belt Conference
College of Charleston Cougars	NAIA independent	NCAA Division I independent
UNC Charlotte 49ers	Sun Belt Conference	Metro Conference
Cincinnati Bearcats	Metro Conference	Great Midwest Conference
Delaware Fightin' Blue Hens	East Coast Conference	North Atlantic Conference
DePaul Blue Demons	NCAA Division I independent	Great Midwest Conference
Drexel Dragons	East Coast Conference	North Atlantic Conference
Florida International Panthers	NCAA Division I independent	Trans America Athletic Conference
Florida State Seminoles	Metro Conference	Atlantic Coast Conference
UNC Greensboro Spartans	NCAA Division II independent	NCAA Division I independent
Lamar Cardinals	American South Conference	Sun Belt Conference
Liberty Flames	NCAA Division I independent	Big South Conference
Louisiana Tech Bulldogs	American South Conference	Sun Belt Conference
Marquette Warriors	Midwestern Collegiate Conference	Great Midwest Conference
Memphis State Tigers	Metro Conference	Great Midwest Conference
Miami (Fla.) Hurricanes	NCAA Division I independent	Big East Conference
Navy Midshipmen	Colonial Athletic Association	Patriot League
New Orleans Privateers	American South Conference	Sun Belt Conference
Nicholls State Colonels	NCAA Division I independent	Southland Conference
Northern Iowa Panthers	Mid-Continent Conference	Missouri Valley Conference
Old Dominion Monarchs	Sun Belt Conference	Colonial Athletic Association
Penn State Nittany Lions	Atlantic 10 Conference	NCAA Division I independent
Sacramento State Hornets	NCAA Division II independent	NCAA Division I independent
Saint Louis Billikens	Midwestern Collegiate Conference	Great Midwest Conference
South Carolina Gamecocks	Metro Conference	Southeastern Conference
South Florida Bulls	Sun Belt Conference	Metro Conference
Southeast Missouri State Redhawks	MIAA (D-II)	Ohio Valley Conference
Southeastern Louisiana Lions	NCAA Division I independent	Trans America Athletic Conference
Southwestern Louisiana Ragin' Cajuns	American South Conference	Sun Belt Conference
Texas–Pan American Broncs	American South Conference	Sun Belt Conference
Texas–San Antonio (UTSA) Roadrunners	Trans America Athletic Conference	Southland Conference
US International Gulls	NCAA Division I independent	Discontinued athletic programs
Virginia Commonwealth (VCU) Rams	Sun Belt Conference	Metro Conference
Wright State Raiders	NCAA Division I independent	Mid-Continent Conference

== Regular season ==
=== Conferences ===
==== Conference winners and tournaments ====
Conference	Regular season first place	Conference player of the year	Conference Coach of the Year	Conference tournament	Tournament venue (city)	Tournament winner
Atlantic 10 Conference	UMass	Harper Williams, UMass	Al Skinner, Rhode Island	1992 Atlantic 10 men's basketball tournament	McGonigle Hall & The Palestra; Philadelphia, Pennsylvania; Curry Hicks Cage; Amherst, Massachusetts	UMass
Atlantic Coast Conference	Duke	Christian Laettner, Duke	Pat Kennedy, Florida State	1992 ACC men's basketball tournament	Charlotte Coliseum; Charlotte, North Carolina	Duke
Big East Conference	Georgetown, St. John's, & Seton Hall	Alonzo Mourning, Georgetown	John Thompson, Georgetown	1992 Big East men's basketball tournament	Madison Square Garden; New York, New York	Syracuse
Big Eight Conference	Kansas	Anthony Peeler, Missouri	Roy Williams, Kansas	1992 Big Eight Conference men's basketball tournament	Kemper Arena; Kansas City, Missouri	Kansas
Big Sky Conference	Montana	Kevin Soares, Nevada, & Delvon Anderson, Montana	Blaine Taylor, Montana	1992 Big Sky Conference men's basketball tournament	Dahlberg Arena; Missoula, Montana	Montana
Big South Conference	Radford	Tony Dunkin, Coastal Carolina	Ron Bradley, Radford	1992 Big South Conference men's basketball tournament	Civic Center of Anderson; Anderson, South Carolina	Campbell
Big Ten Conference	Ohio State	Jim Jackson, Ohio State	Randy Ayers, Ohio State	No Tournament		
Big West Conference	UNLV	Lucius Davis, UC Santa Barbara	Jerry Pimm, UC Santa Barbara, & Jerry Tarkanian, UNLV	1992 Big West Conference men's basketball tournament	Long Beach Arena; Long Beach, California	New Mexico State
Colonial Athletic Association	James Madison & Richmond	Curtis Blair, Richmond	Lefty Driesell, James Madison	1992 CAA men's basketball tournament	Richmond Coliseum; Richmond, Virginia	Old Dominion
East Coast Conference	Hofstra	Terrance Jacobs, Towson State		1992 East Coast Conference men's basketball tournament	RAC Arena; Catonsville, Maryland	Towson State
Great Midwest Conference	Cincinnati & DePaul	Penny Hardaway, Memphis State		1992 Great Midwest Conference men's basketball tournament	Chicago Stadium; Chicago, Illinois	Cincinnati
Ivy League	Princeton	Sean Jackson, Princeton	Not named	No Tournament		
Metro Conference	Tulane	Clarence Weatherspoon, Southern Miss	Perry Clark, Tulane	1992 Metro Conference men's basketball tournament	Freedom Hall; Louisville, Kentucky	UNC Charlotte
Metro Atlantic Athletic Conference	Manhattan	Randy Woods, La Salle	Steve Lappas, Manhattan	1992 MAAC men's basketball tournament	Knickerbocker Arena; Albany, New York	La Salle
Mid-American Conference	Miami (OH)	Lewis Geter, Ohio	Bob Donewald, Western Michigan	1992 MAC men's basketball tournament	Cobo Arena; Detroit, Michigan	Miami (OH)
Mid-Continent Conference	Wisconsin–Green Bay	Tony Bennett, Wisconsin–Green Bay	Dick Bennett, Wisconsin–Green Bay	1992 Mid-Continent Conference men's basketball tournament	CSU Convocation Center; Cleveland, Ohio	Eastern Illinois
Mid-Eastern Athletic Conference	Howard & North Carolina A&T	DeLon Turner, Florida A&M	Butch Beard, Howard	1992 MEAC men's basketball tournament	Norfolk Scope; Norfolk, Virginia	Howard
Midwestern Collegiate Conference	Evansville	Parrish Casebier, Evansville	Jim Crews, Evansville	1992 Midwestern Collegiate Conference men's basketball tournament	Riverfront Coliseum; Cincinnati, Ohio	Evansville
Missouri Valley Conference	Illinois State & Southern Illinois	Ashraf Amaya, Southern Illinois	Bob Bender, Illinois State	1992 Missouri Valley Conference men's basketball tournament	St. Louis Arena; St. Louis, Missouri	Southwest Missouri State
North Atlantic Conference	Delaware	Kevin Roberson, Vermont	Steve Steinwedel, Delaware	1992 North Atlantic Conference men's basketball tournament	Delaware Field House, Newark, Delaware	Delaware
Northeast Conference	Robert Morris	Myron Walker, Robert Morris	Tim Capstraw, Wagner	1992 Northeast Conference men's basketball tournament	Charles L. Sewall Center; Moon Township, Pennsylvania	Robert Morris
Ohio Valley Conference	Murray State	Brett Roberts, Morehead State	Scott Edgar, Murray State	1992 Ohio Valley Conference men's basketball tournament	Rupp Arena; Lexington, Kentucky	Murray State
Pacific-10 Conference	UCLA	Harold Miner, USC	George Raveling, USC	No Tournament		
Patriot League	Bucknell & Fordham	Patrick King, Bucknell	Jack Bruen, Colgate	1992 Patriot League men's basketball tournament	Stabler Arena; Bethlehem, Pennsylvania	Fordham
Southeastern Conference	Kentucky (East); Arkansas (West)	Shaquille O'Neal, LSU	Lon Kruger, Florida	1992 SEC men's basketball tournament	Birmingham-Jefferson Convention Complex; Birmingham, Alabama	Kentucky
Southern Conference	Chattanooga & East Tennessee State	Terry Boyd, Western Carolina, & Keith Nelson, Chattanooga	Mack McCarthy, Chattanooga	1992 Southern Conference men's basketball tournament	Asheville Civic Center; Asheville, North Carolina	East Tennessee State
Southland Conference	Texas–San Antonio	Ryan Stuart, Northeast Louisiana	Rickey Broussard, Nicholls State	1992 Southland Conference men's basketball tournament	Convocation Center; San Antonio, Texas	Northeast Louisiana
Southwest Conference	Houston & Texas	Will Flemons, Texas Tech	James Dickey, Texas Tech, & Pat Foster, Houston	1992 Southwest Conference men's basketball tournament	Reunion Arena; Dallas, Texas	Houston
Southwestern Athletic Conference	Mississippi Valley State & Texas Southern	Steve Rogers, Alabama State	Lafayette Stribling, Mississippi Valley State	1992 SWAC men's basketball tournament	Riverside Centroplex; Baton Rouge, Louisiana	Mississippi Valley State
Sun Belt Conference	Louisiana Tech & Southwestern Louisiana	Ron Ellis, Louisiana Tech	Marty Fletcher, Louisiana Tech	1992 Sun Belt Conference men's basketball tournament	Mississippi Coast Coliseum; Biloxi, Mississippi	Southwestern Louisiana
Trans America Athletic Conference	Georgia Southern	Tony Windless, Georgia Southern	Frank Kerns, Georgia Southern	1992 TAAC men's basketball tournament	Hanner Fieldhouse; Statesboro, Georgia	Georgia Southern
West Coast Athletic Conference	Pepperdine	Doug Christie, Pepperdine	Tom Asbury, Pepperdine	1992 West Coast Conference men's basketball tournament	Chiles Center; Portland, Oregon	Pepperdine
Western Athletic Conference	BYU & UTEP	Reggie Slater, Wyoming	Roger Reid, BYU	1992 WAC men's basketball tournament	Moby Arena; Fort Collins, Colorado	BYU

==== Conference standings ====
1991–92 ACC men's basketball standings
	Conf.				Overall
Team	W		L	PCT	W		L	PCT
No. 1 Duke †	14	–	2	.875	34	–	2	.944
No. 20 Florida State	11	–	5	.688	22	–	10	.688
No. 18 North Carolina	9	–	7	.563	23	–	10	.697
Georgia Tech	8	–	8	.500	23	–	12	.657
Virginia	8	–	8	.500	20	–	13	.606
Wake Forest	7	–	9	.438	17	–	12	.586
NC State	6	–	10	.375	12	–	18	.400
Maryland	5	–	11	.313	14	–	15	.483
Clemson	4	–	12	.250	14	–	14	.500
† 1992 ACC tournament winner Rankings from AP Poll

1991–92 Atlantic 10 men's basketball standings
	Conf.				Overall
Team	W		L	PCT	W		L	PCT
No. 17 UMass †	13	–	3	.813	30	–	5	.857
Temple	11	–	5	.688	17	–	13	.567
West Virginia	10	–	6	.625	20	–	12	.625
Rhode Island	9	–	7	.563	22	–	10	.688
George Washington	8	–	8	.500	16	–	12	.571
Rutgers	6	–	10	.375	16	–	15	.516
Duquesne	6	–	10	.375	13	–	15	.464
Saint Joseph's	6	–	10	.375	13	–	15	.464
St. Bonaventure	3	–	13	.188	9	–	19	.321
† 1992 Atlantic 10 Tournament winner Rankings from AP Poll

1991–92 Big East men's basketball standings
	Conf.				Overall
Team	W		L	PCT	W		L	PCT
No. 19 Seton Hall	12	–	6	.667	23	–	9	.719
No. 22 Georgetown	12	–	6	.667	22	–	10	.688
St. John's	12	–	6	.667	19	–	11	.633
Villanova	11	–	7	.611	14	–	15	.483
No. 21 Syracuse†	10	–	8	.556	22	–	10	.688
Connecticut	10	–	8	.556	20	–	10	.667
Pittsburgh	9	–	9	.500	18	–	16	.529
Boston College	7	–	11	.389	17	–	14	.548
Providence	6	–	12	.333	14	–	17	.452
Miami	1	–	17	.056	8	–	24	.250
† 1992 Big East tournament winner As of April 6, 1992; Rankings from AP Poll

1991–92 Big Eight Conference men's basketball standings
	Conf.				Overall
Team	W		L	PCT	W		L	PCT
No. 2 Kansas †	11	–	3	.786	27	–	5	.844
No. 11 Oklahoma State	8	–	6	.571	28	–	8	.778
No. 16 Missouri	8	–	6	.571	21	–	9	.700
No. 23 Oklahoma	8	–	6	.571	21	–	9	.700
Nebraska	7	–	7	.500	19	–	10	.655
Iowa State	5	–	9	.357	21	–	13	.618
Kansas State	5	–	9	.357	16	–	14	.533
Colorado	4	–	10	.286	13	–	15	.464
† 1992 Big Eight tournament winner As of April 6, 1992; Rankings from AP poll

1991–92 Big Sky men's basketball standings
	Conf.				Overall
Team	W		L	PCT	W		L	PCT
Montana †	14	–	2	.875	27	–	4	.871
Nevada	13	–	3	.813	19	–	10	.655
Weber State	10	–	6	.625	16	–	13	.552
Idaho	10	–	6	.625	18	–	14	.563
Boise State	7	–	9	.438	16	–	13	.552
Idaho State	6	–	10	.375	9	–	21	.300
Montana State	6	–	10	.375	14	–	14	.500
Northern Arizona	3	–	13	.188	7	–	20	.259
Eastern Washington	3	–	13	.188	6	–	21	.222
† Conference tournament winner

1991–92 Big South Conference men's basketball standings
	Conf.				Overall
Team	W		L	PCT	W		L	PCT
Radford	12	–	2	.857	20	–	9	.690
Liberty	10	–	4	.714	22	–	7	.759
Campbell †	7	–	7	.500	19	–	12	.613
Charleston Southern	7	–	7	.500	16	–	14	.533
Coastal Carolina	6	–	8	.429	12	–	19	.387
Davidson	6	–	8	.429	11	–	17	.393
UNC Asheville	6	–	8	.429	9	–	19	.321
Winthrop	2	–	12	.143	6	–	22	.214
† 1992 Big South tournament winner Rankings from AP Poll

1991–92 Big Ten Conference men's basketball standings
	Conf.				Overall
Team	W		L	PCT	W		L	PCT
No. 3 Ohio State	15	–	3	.833	26	–	6	.813
No. 5 Indiana	14	–	4	.778	27	–	7	.794
No. 15 Michigan	11	–	7	.611	24	–	9	.727
No. 14 Michigan State	11	–	7	.611	22	–	8	.733
Iowa	10	–	8	.556	19	–	11	.633
Purdue	8	–	10	.444	18	–	15	.545
Minnesota	8	–	10	.444	16	–	16	.500
Illinois	7	–	11	.389	13	–	15	.464
Wisconsin	4	–	14	.222	13	–	18	.419
Northwestern	2	–	16	.111	9	–	19	.321
Rankings from AP Poll

1991–92 Big West men's basketball standings
	Conf.				Overall
Team	W		L	PCT	W		L	PCT
No. 7 UNLV	18	–	0	1.000	26	–	2	.929
UC Santa Barbara	13	–	5	.722	20	–	9	.690
New Mexico State†	12	–	6	.667	25	–	8	.758
Long Beach State	11	–	7	.611	18	–	12	.600
Utah State	10	–	8	.556	16	–	12	.571
Pacific	8	–	10	.444	14	–	16	.467
Cal State Fullerton	8	–	10	.444	12	–	16	.429
Fresno State	6	–	12	.333	15	–	16	.484
UC Irvine	3	–	15	.167	7	–	22	.241
San Jose State	1	–	17	.056	2	–	24	.077
† 1992 Big West tournament winner Rankings from AP poll

1991–92 CAA men's basketball standings
	Conf.				Overall
Team	W		L	PCT	W		L	PCT
Richmond	12	–	2	.857	22	–	8	.733
James Madison	12	–	2	.857	21	–	11	.656
American	8	–	6	.571	11	–	18	.379
Old Dominion †	8	–	6	.571	15	–	15	.500
UNC Wilmington	6	–	8	.429	13	–	15	.464
East Carolina	4	–	10	.286	10	–	18	.357
William & Mary	3	–	11	.214	10	–	19	.345
George Mason	3	–	11	.214	7	–	21	.250
† 1992 CAA tournament winner Rankings from AP Poll

1991–92 East Coast Conference men's basketball standings
	Conf.				Overall
Team	W		L	PCT	W		L	PCT
Hofstra	10	–	2	.833	20	–	9	.690
Towson State †	9	–	3	.750	17	–	13	.567
Rider	9	–	3	.750	16	–	13	.552
UMBC	8	–	4	.667	10	–	19	.345
Central Connecticut State	3	–	9	.250	7	–	21	.250
Brooklyn	3	–	9	.250	5	–	23	.179
Buffalo	0	–	12	.000	2	–	26	.071
† 1992 ECC tournament winner Rankings from AP Poll

1991–92 Great Midwest Conference men's basketball standings
	Conf.				Overall
Team	W		L	PCT	W		L	PCT
No. 12 Cincinnati †	8	–	2	.800	29	–	5	.853
No. 24 DePaul	8	–	2	.800	20	–	9	.690
Marquette	5	–	5	.500	16	–	13	.552
Memphis State	5	–	5	.500	23	–	11	.676
UAB	4	–	6	.400	20	–	9	.690
Saint Louis	0	–	10	.000	5	–	23	.179
† 1992 GMC tournament winner Rankings from AP Poll

1991–92 Ivy League men's basketball standings
	Conf.				Overall
Team	W		L	PCT	W		L	PCT
Princeton	12	–	2	.857	22	–	6	.786
Penn	9	–	5	.643	16	–	10	.615
Columbia	8	–	6	.571	10	–	16	.385
Yale	7	–	7	.500	17	–	9	.654
Brown	5	–	9	.357	11	–	15	.423
Dartmouth	5	–	9	.357	10	–	16	.385
Cornell	5	–	9	.357	7	–	19	.269
Harvard	5	–	9	.357	6	–	20	.231
Rankings from AP Poll

1991–92 Metro Conference men's basketball standings
	Conf.				Overall
Team	W		L	PCT	W		L	PCT
Tulane	8	–	4	.667	22	–	9	.710
UNC Charlotte †	7	–	5	.583	23	–	9	.719
South Florida	7	–	5	.583	19	–	10	.655
Louisville	7	–	5	.583	19	–	11	.633
VCU	5	–	7	.417	14	–	15	.483
Southern Miss	5	–	7	.417	13	–	16	.448
Virginia Tech	3	–	9	.250	10	–	18	.357
† 1992 Metro Conference tournament winner Rankings from AP poll

1991–92 MAAC men's basketball standings
	Conf.				Overall
Team	W		L	PCT	W		L	PCT
Manhattan	13	–	3	.813	25	–	9	.735
La Salle †	12	–	4	.750	20	–	11	.645
Siena	11	–	5	.688	19	–	10	.655
Loyola (MD)	10	–	6	.625	14	–	14	.500
Iona	8	–	8	.500	14	–	15	.483
Niagara	8	–	8	.500	14	–	14	.500
Fairfield	4	–	12	.250	8	–	20	.286
Saint Peter's	3	–	13	.188	8	–	21	.276
Canisius	3	–	13	.188	8	–	22	.267
† 1992 MAAC tournament winner Rankings from AP Poll

1991–92 Mid-American Conference men's basketball standings
	Conf.				Overall
Team	W		L	PCT	W		L	PCT
Miami (OH) †	13	–	3	.813	23	–	8	.742
Ball State	11	–	5	.688	24	–	9	.727
Western Michigan	11	–	5	.688	21	–	9	.700
Ohio	10	–	6	.625	18	–	10	.643
Bowling Green	8	–	8	.500	14	–	15	.483
Kent State	6	–	10	.375	9	–	19	.321
Central Michigan	6	–	10	.375	12	–	16	.429
Eastern Michigan	4	–	12	.250	9	–	22	.290
Toledo	3	–	13	.188	7	–	20	.259
† 1992 MAC tournament winner Rankings from AP Poll

1991–92 Mid-Continent Conference men's basketball standings
	Conf.				Overall
Team	W		L	PCT	W		L	PCT
Wisconsin–Green Bay	14	–	2	.875	25	–	5	.833
Akron	10	–	6	.625	16	–	12	.571
Illinois–Chicago	10	–	6	.625	16	–	14	.533
Eastern Illinois †	9	–	7	.563	17	–	14	.548
Wright State	9	–	7	.563	15	–	13	.536
Northern Illinois	7	–	9	.438	11	–	17	.393
Cleveland State	7	–	9	.438	16	–	13	.552
Western Illinois	4	–	12	.250	10	–	18	.357
Valparaiso	2	–	14	.125	5	–	22	.185
† 1992 Mid-Con Tournament winner

1991–92 MEAC men's basketball standings
	Conf.				Overall
Team	W		L	PCT	W		L	PCT
North Carolina A&T	12	–	4	.750	18	–	9	.667
Howard †	12	–	4	.750	17	–	14	.548
Florida A&M	11	–	5	.688	16	–	14	.533
Coppin State	9	–	7	.563	15	–	13	.536
South Carolina State	9	–	7	.563	14	–	15	.483
Delaware State	9	–	7	.563	12	–	16	.429
Morgan State	5	–	11	.313	6	–	23	.207
Bethune–Cookman	3	–	13	.188	4	–	25	.138
Maryland Eastern Shore	2	–	14	.125	3	–	25	.107
† 1992 MEAC tournament winner Rankings from AP Poll

1991–92 Midwestern Collegiate Conference men's basketball standings
	Conf.				Overall
Team	W		L	PCT	W		L	PCT
Evansville †	8	–	2	.800	24	–	6	.800
Xavier	7	–	3	.700	15	–	12	.556
Butler	7	–	3	.700	21	–	10	.677
Dayton	5	–	5	.500	15	–	15	.500
Loyola (IL)	2	–	8	.200	13	–	16	.448
Detroit Mercy	1	–	9	.100	12	–	17	.414
† 1992 MCC tournament winner Rankings from AP Poll

1991–92 Missouri Valley Conference men's basketball standings
	Conf.				Overall
Team	W		L	PCT	W		L	PCT
Southern Illinois	14	–	4	.778	22	–	8	.733
Illinois State	14	–	4	.778	18	–	11	.621
Southwest Missouri State †	13	–	5	.722	23	–	8	.742
Indiana State	12	–	6	.667	13	–	15	.464
Tulsa	12	–	6	.667	17	–	13	.567
Creighton	7	–	11	.389	9	–	19	.321
Northern Iowa	6	–	12	.333	10	–	18	.357
Wichita State	6	–	12	.333	8	–	20	.286
Drake	3	–	15	.167	6	–	21	.222
Bradley	3	–	15	.167	7	–	23	.233
† 1992 MVC tournament winner Rankings from AP Poll

1991–92 North Atlantic Conference men's basketball standings
	Conf.				Overall
Team	W		L	PCT	W		L	PCT
Delaware †	14	–	0	1.000	27	–	4	.871
Drexel	9	–	5	.643	16	–	14	.533
Maine	8	–	6	.571	17	–	15	.531
Vermont	7	–	7	.500	16	–	13	.552
Northeastern	5	–	9	.357	9	–	19	.321
Boston University	5	–	9	.357	10	–	18	.357
New Hampshire	5	–	9	.357	7	–	21	.250
Hartford	3	–	11	.214	6	–	21	.222
† 1992 NAC tournament winner Rankings from AP poll

1991–92 Northeast Conference men's basketball standings
	Conf.				Overall
Team	W		L	PCT	W		L	PCT
Robert Morris†	12	–	4	.750	19	–	12	.613
Monmouth	11	–	5	.688	20	–	9	.690
Fairleigh Dickinson	11	–	5	.688	14	–	14	.500
Wagner	9	–	7	.563	16	–	12	.571
St. Francis (NY)	8	–	8	.500	15	–	14	.517
Long Island	7	–	9	.438	11	–	18	.379
Marist	6	–	10	.375	10	–	20	.333
Saint Francis (PA)	5	–	11	.313	13	–	16	.448
Mount St. Mary's	3	–	13	.188	6	–	22	.214
† 1992 NEC tournament winner

1991–92 Ohio Valley Conference men's basketball standings
	Conf.				Overall
Team	W		L	PCT	W		L	PCT
Murray State †	11	–	3	.786	17	–	13	.567
Eastern Kentucky	9	–	5	.643	19	–	14	.576
Middle Tennessee State	9	–	5	.643	16	–	11	.593
Tennessee Tech	8	–	6	.571	14	–	15	.483
Austin Peay	6	–	8	.429	11	–	17	.393
Morehead State	6	–	8	.429	14	–	15	.483
Southeast Missouri State	5	–	9	.357	12	–	16	.429
Tennessee State	2	–	12	.143	4	–	24	.143
† 1992 OVC tournament winner Rankings from AP Poll

1991–92 Pacific-10 Conference men's basketball standings
	Conf.				Overall
Team	W		L	PCT	W		L	PCT
No. 4 UCLA	16	–	2	.889	28	–	5	.848
No. 8 USC	15	–	3	.833	24	–	6	.800
No. 10 Arizona	13	–	5	.722	24	–	7	.774
Stanford	10	–	8	.556	18	–	11	.621
Washington State	9	–	9	.500	22	–	11	.667
Arizona State	9	–	9	.500	19	–	14	.576
Oregon State	7	–	11	.389	15	–	16	.484
Washington	5	–	13	.278	12	–	17	.414
California	4	–	14	.222	10	–	18	.357
Oregon	2	–	16	.111	6	–	21	.222
As of April 15, 1991; Rankings from AP Poll

1991–92 Patriot League men's basketball standings
	Conf.				Overall
Team	W		L	PCT	W		L	PCT
Fordham †	11	–	3	.786	18	–	13	.581
Bucknell	11	–	3	.786	21	–	9	.700
Holy Cross	10	–	4	.714	18	–	11	.621
Lehigh	8	–	6	.571	14	–	15	.483
Colgate	7	–	7	.500	14	–	14	.500
Lafayette	6	–	8	.429	8	–	20	.286
Army	2	–	12	.143	4	–	24	.143
Navy	1	–	13	.071	6	–	22	.214
† 1992 Patriot League tournament winner

1991–92 Southeastern Conference men's basketball standings
	Conf.				Overall
Team	W		L	PCT	W		L	PCT
East
No. 6 Kentucky †	12	–	4	.750	29	–	7	.806
Florida	9	–	7	.563	19	–	14	.576
Tennessee	8	–	8	.500	19	–	15	.559
Georgia	7	–	9	.438	15	–	14	.517
Vanderbilt	6	–	10	.375	15	–	15	.500
South Carolina	3	–	13	.188	11	–	17	.393
West
No. 9 Arkansas	13	–	3	.813	26	–	8	.765
No. 25 LSU	12	–	4	.750	21	–	10	.677
No. 13 Alabama	10	–	6	.625	26	–	9	.743
Mississippi State	7	–	9	.438	15	–	13	.536
Auburn	5	–	11	.313	12	–	15	.444
Ole Miss	4	–	12	.250	11	–	17	.393
† 1992 SEC tournament winner Rankings from AP Poll

1991–92 Southern Conference men's basketball standings
	Conf.				Overall
Team	W		L	PCT	W		L	PCT
East Tennessee State †	12	–	2	.857	24	–	7	.774
Chattanooga	12	–	2	.857	23	–	7	.767
Furman	9	–	5	.643	17	–	11	.607
Appalachian State	9	–	5	.643	15	–	14	.517
Western Carolina	5	–	9	.357	11	–	17	.393
Marshall	3	–	11	.214	7	–	22	.241
VMI	3	–	11	.214	10	–	18	.357
The Citadel	3	–	11	.214	10	–	18	.357
† 1992 SoCon Tournament winner As of April 30, 1992; Rankings from AP poll

1991–92 Southland Conference men's basketball standings
	Conf.				Overall
Team	W		L	PCT	W		L	PCT
UTSA	15	–	3	.833	21	–	8	.724
NE Louisiana †	12	–	6	.667	19	–	10	.655
Nicholls State	12	–	6	.667	15	–	13	.536
North Texas State	12	–	6	.667	15	–	14	.517
UT Arlington	11	–	7	.611	16	–	13	.552
Stephen F. Austin	10	–	8	.556	15	–	13	.536
Northwestern State	9	–	9	.500	15	–	13	.536
Southwest Texas State	4	–	14	.222	7	–	20	.259
McNeese State	4	–	14	.222	7	–	22	.241
Sam Houston State	1	–	17	.056	2	–	25	.074
† 1992 Southland Conference tournament winner Rankings from AP Poll

1991–92 Southwest Conference men's basketball standings
	Conf.				Overall
Team	W		L	PCT	W		L	PCT
Houston †	11	–	3	.786	25	–	6	.806
Texas	11	–	3	.786	23	–	12	.657
TCU	9	–	5	.643	23	–	11	.676
Rice	8	–	6	.571	20	–	11	.645
Texas Tech	6	–	8	.429	15	–	14	.517
Baylor	5	–	9	.357	13	–	15	.464
SMU	4	–	10	.286	10	–	18	.357
Texas A&M	2	–	12	.143	6	–	22	.214
† 1992 SWC tournament winner Rankings from AP poll

1991–92 SWAC men's basketball standings
	Conf.				Overall
Team	W		L	PCT	W		L	PCT
Mississippi Valley State †	11	–	3	.786	16	–	14	.533
Texas Southern	11	–	3	.786	15	–	14	.517
Southern	9	–	5	.643	18	–	12	.600
Alcorn State	8	–	6	.571	15	–	14	.517
Alabama State	8	–	6	.571	14	–	14	.500
Jackson State	7	–	7	.500	12	–	16	.429
Grambling State	2	–	12	.143	4	–	24	.143
Prairie View A&M	0	–	14	.000	0	–	28	.000
† 1992 SWAC tournament winner Rankings from AP Poll

1991–92 Sun Belt Conference men's basketball standings
	Conf.				Overall
Team	W		L	PCT	W		L	PCT
Louisiana Tech	12	–	4	.750	22	–	9	.710
SW Louisiana †	12	–	4	.750	21	–	11	.656
Arkansas State	11	–	5	.688	17	–	11	.607
Western Kentucky	10	–	6	.625	21	–	11	.656
South Alabama	9	–	7	.563	14	–	14	.500
Arkansas-Little Rock	8	–	8	.500	17	–	13	.567
New Orleans	9	–	7	.563	17	–	15	.531
Lamar	7	–	9	.438	12	–	19	.387
Jacksonville	6	–	10	.375	12	–	17	.414
UCF	3	–	13	.188	10	–	18	.357
Texas-Rio Grande Valley	1	–	15	.063	3	–	26	.103
† 1992 Sun Belt Conference tournament winner Rankings from AP Poll

1991–92 Trans America Athletic Conference men's basketball standings
	Conf.				Overall
Team	W		L	PCT	W		L	PCT
Georgia Southern †	13	–	1	.929	25	–	6	.806
Georgia State	8	–	6	.571	16	–	14	.533
Florida International	7	–	7	.500	11	–	17	.393
Samford	7	–	7	.500	11	–	18	.379
Stetson	6	–	8	.429	11	–	17	.393
Mercer	6	–	8	.429	11	–	18	.379
Centenary (LA)	5	–	9	.357	10	–	18	.357
Southeastern Louisiana	4	–	10	.286	6	–	22	.214
† 1992 TAAC tournament winner Rankings from AP Poll

1991–92 West Coast Conference men's basketball standings
	Conf.				Overall
Team	W		L	PCT	W		L	PCT
Pepperdine †	14	–	0	1.000	24	–	7	.774
Santa Clara	9	–	5	.643	14	–	15	.483
Loyola Marymount	8	–	6	.571	15	–	13	.536
Gonzaga	8	–	6	.571	20	–	10	.667
San Diego	6	–	8	.429	14	–	14	.500
San Francisco	4	–	10	.286	13	–	16	.448
Saint Mary's (CA)	4	–	10	.286	13	–	17	.433
Portland	3	–	11	.214	10	–	18	.357
† Conference tournament winner Rankings from AP poll

1991–92 WAC men's basketball standings
	Conf.				Overall
Team	W		L	PCT	W		L	PCT
BYU †	12	–	4	.750	25	–	7	.781
UTEP	12	–	4	.750	27	–	7	.794
New Mexico	11	–	5	.688	20	–	13	.606
Utah	9	–	7	.563	24	–	11	.686
Hawaii	9	–	7	.563	16	–	12	.571
Wyoming	8	–	8	.500	16	–	13	.552
Colorado State	8	–	8	.500	14	–	17	.452
Air Force	3	–	13	.188	9	–	20	.310
San Diego State	0	–	16	.000	2	–	26	.071
† 1992 WAC tournament winner Rankings from AP poll

=== Division I independents ===
A total of 12 college teams played as Division I independents. Among them, UMKC (21–7) had the best winning percentage (.750), and UMKC and Penn State (21–8) had the most wins.

1991–92 NCAA Division I men's basketball independents standings
	Conf.				Overall
Team	W		L	PCT	W		L	PCT
UMKC	-	–	-	–	21	–	7	.750
Penn State	-	–	-	–	21	–	8	.724
UW-Milwaukee	-	–	-	–	20	–	8	.714
Southern Utah	-	–	-	–	20	–	8	.714
College of Charleston	-	–	-	–	19	–	8	.704
Notre Dame	-	–	-	–	18	–	15	.545
Cal State Northridge	-	–	-	–	11	–	17	.393
Northeastern Illinois	-	–	-	–	8	–	20	.286
Chicago State	-	–	-	–	7	–	21	.250
UNC Greensboro	-	–	-	–	7	–	21	.250
Youngstown State	-	–	-	–	6	–	22	.214
Sacramento State	-	–	-	–	4	–	24	.143
Rankings from AP Poll

=== Informal championships ===
Conference	Regular season winner	Most Valuable Player
Philadelphia Big 5	La Salle, Penn, Saint Joseph's, Temple, & Villanova	Randy Woods, La Salle

For the first time since its first season of competition in the 1955–56 season, the Philadelphia Big 5 did not play a full round-robin schedule in which each team met each other team once. Instead, each team played only two games against other Big 5 members, and all five teams finished with 1–1 records in head-to-head competition among the Big 5. The Big 5 did not revive its full round-robin schedule until the 1999–2000 season.

=== Statistical leaders ===
Points per game			Rebounds per game			Assists per game			Blocked shots per game		
Player	School	PPG	Player	School	RPG	Player	School	APG	Player	School	BPG
Brett Roberts	Morehead State	28.1	Popeye Jones	Murray State	14.4	Van Usher	Tennessee Tech	8.8	Shaquille O'Neal	LSU	5.2
Vin Baker	Hartford	27.6	Shaquille O'Neal	LSU	14.0	Sam Crawford	New Mexico State	8.5	Alonzo Mourning	Georgetown	5.0
Alphonso Ford	Mississippi Valley State	27.5	Tim Burroughs	Jacksonville	13.2	Orlando Smart	San Francisco	8.3	Kevin Roberson	Vermont	5.0
Randy Woods	La Salle	27.3	Adam Keefe	Stanford	12.2	Kevin Soares	Nevada	7.8	Acie Earl	Iowa	4.0
Steve Rogers	Alabama State	27.3	Leonard White	Southern	12.2	Chuck Evans	Mississippi State	7.8	Vin Baker	Hartford	3.7

== Postseason tournaments ==
=== NCAA Tournament ===
==== Final Four - Hubert H. Humphrey Metrodome, Minneapolis, Minnesota ====
National semifinals
E1	Duke	81
W2	Indiana	78
S6	Michigan#	76
M4	Cincinnati	72

National championship game
E1	Duke	71
S6	Michigan#	51

# signifies Michigan's final two games, in the 1992 Final Four, were vacated on November 7, 2002, as part of the settlement of the University of Michigan basketball scandal. Unlike forfeiture, a vacated game does not result in the other school being credited with a win, only with the removal of any Michigan wins from all records.

=== National Invitation Tournament ===
==== NIT Semifinals and Final ====
Semifinals
Florida	56
Virginia	62
Notre Dame	58
Utah	55

Finals
Virginia	81^{OT}
Notre Dame	76

Third place game
Florida	78
Utah	81

== Award winners ==
=== Consensus All-American teams ===
Consensus First Team
Player	Position	Class	Team
Jimmy Jackson	G/F	Junior	Ohio State
Christian Laettner	F	Senior	Duke
Harold Miner	G	Junior	Southern California
Alonzo Mourning	C	Senior	Georgetown
Shaquille O'Neal	C	Junior	LSU

Consensus Second Team
Player	Position	Class	Team
Byron Houston	F	Senior	Oklahoma State
Don MacLean	F	Senior	UCLA
Anthony Peeler	G	Senior	Missouri
Malik Sealy	G/F	Senior	St. John's
Walt Williams	G	Senior	Maryland

=== Major player of the year awards ===
- Wooden Award: Christian Laettner, Duke
- Naismith Award: Christian Laettner, Duke
- Associated Press Player of the Year: Christian Laettner, Duke
- UPI Player of the Year: Jim Jackson, Ohio State
- NABC Player of the Year: Christian Laettner, Duke
- Oscar Robertson Trophy (USBWA): Christian Laettner, Duke
- Adolph Rupp Trophy: Christian Laettner, Duke
- Sporting News Player of the Year: Christian Laettner, Duke

=== Major coach of the year awards ===
- Associated Press Coach of the Year: Roy Williams, Kansas
- UPI Coach of the Year: Perry Clark, Tulane
- Henry Iba Award (USBWA): Perry Clark, Tulane
- NABC Coach of the Year: George Raveling, USC
- Naismith College Coach of the Year: Mike Krzyzewski, Duke
- CBS/Chevrolet Coach of the Year: George Raveling, USC
- Sporting News Coach of the Year: Mike Krzyzewski, Duke

=== Other major awards ===
- Frances Pomeroy Naismith Award (Best player under 6'0): Tony Bennett, Wisconsin-Green Bay
- Robert V. Geasey Trophy (Top player in Philadelphia Big 5): Randy Woods, La Salle
- NIT/Haggerty Award (Top player in New York City metro area): Malik Sealy, St. John's
- USBWA National Freshman of the Year: Chris Webber, Michigan

== Coaching changes ==
A number of teams changed coaches during the season and after it ended.

Team	Former Coach	Interim Coach	New Coach	Reason
Alabama	Wimp Sanderson		David Hobbs	Sanderson resigned after the season after having an affair with his secretary. Alabama elevated Hobbs from assistant to head coach.
Baylor	Gene Iba		Darrel Johnson	Iba's contract was not renewed. Johnson was hired after winning back to back NAIA national championships for Oklahoma City.
Cal State Fullerton	John Sneed		Brad Holland	Holland was hired from the UCLA coaching staff.
Canisius	Marty Marbach		John Beilein	
The Citadel	Randy Nesbit		Pat Dennis	
Eastern Kentucky	Mike Pollio		Mike Calhoun	
Kent State	John McDonald		Dave Grube	
Loyola Marymount	Jay Hillock		John Olive	Olive was hired from the Villanova coaching staff.
Manhattan	Steve Lappas		Fran Fraschilla	Lappas left for Villanova and Providence assistant Fraschilla replaced him.
Maryland Eastern Shore	Bob Hopkins	Bob Wilkerson	Rob Chavez	
Navy	Pete Herrmann		Don DeVoe	Herrmann was left go after the season and joined the Kansas State coaching staff.
New Hampshire	Jim Boylan		Gib Chapman	Chapman was hired as athletic director in 1989 and stepped in to be head coach to save costs for school.
Ole Miss	Ed Murphy		Rob Evans	Evans was hired from the Oklahoma State coaching staff.
Oregon	Don Monson		Jerry Green	Green was hired from the Kansas coaching staff.
Rice	Scott Thompson		Willis Wilson	Thompson left to coach Wichita State. Wilson was hired from the Stanford coaching staff.
Sacramento State	Joseph Anders		Don Newman	Newman was hired from the Washington State coaching staff.
Saint Francis (PA)	Jim Baron		Tom McConnell	Baron left to coach St. Bonaventure.
Saint Louis	Rich Grawer		Charlie Spoonhour	
San Diego State	Jim Brandenburg	Jim Harrick Jr.	Tom Fuller	Brandenburg was fired in the middle of the season after a 2–19 start. Harrick Jr. came on and finished the season 0–7. Fuller was hired from the UCLA coaching staff.
Santa Clara	Carroll Williams		Dick Davey	Williams was promoted to athletic director after 22 years at Santa Clara. Davey was promoted to head coach after being Williams assistant for 15 years.
Southeastern Louisiana	Don Wilson		Norm Picou	
Southwest Missouri State	Charlie Spoonhour		Mark Bernsen	Spoonhour left to coach Saint Louis.
Southern Utah	Neil Roberts	Bill Evans		Roberts resigned midseason after allegations of stealing a necktie.
St. Bonaventure	Tom Chapman		Jim Baron	
St. John's	Lou Carnesecca		Brian Mahoney	Carnesecca retired after 27 years and assistant Mahoney replaced him.
Texas–Rio Grande Valley	Kevin Wall		Mark Adams	Adams was hired from Division II West Texas A&M
UNLV	Jerry Tarkanian		Rollie Massimino	Tarkanian left to coach the San Antonio Spurs and Massimino replaced him.
UT Arlington	Mark Nixon		Eddie McCarter	
Villanova	Rollie Massimino		Steve Lappas	Massimino left to coach UNLV and Lappas replaced him.
Western Illinois	Jack Margenthaler		Jim Kerwin	Kerwin was hired from the Kansas State staff.
Wichita State	Mike Cohen		Scott Thompson	
Winthrop	Steve Vacendak		Dan Kenney	
Wisconsin	Steve Yoder		Stu Jackson	Yoder was forced to resign after the end of the season.
