= 1992 Big East men's basketball tournament =

American college basketball tournament

- Classification: Division I
- Season: 1991–92
- Teams: 10
- Site: Madison Square Garden; New York City
- Champions: Syracuse (3rd title)
- Winning coach: Jim Boeheim (3rd title)
- MVP: Alonzo Mourning (Georgetown)

1991–92 Big East men's basketball standings
| | Conf. | | | | Overall |
| Team | W | | L | PCT | W | | L | PCT |
|---|---|---|---|---|---|---|---|---|
| No. 19 Seton Hall | 12 | – | 6 | .667 | 23 | – | 9 | .719 |
| No. 22 Georgetown | 12 | – | 6 | .667 | 22 | – | 10 | .688 |
| St. John's | 12 | – | 6 | .667 | 19 | – | 11 | .633 |
| Villanova | 11 | – | 7 | .611 | 14 | – | 15 | .483 |
| No. 21 Syracuse† | 10 | – | 8 | .556 | 22 | – | 10 | .688 |
| Connecticut | 10 | – | 8 | .556 | 20 | – | 10 | .667 |
| Pittsburgh | 9 | – | 9 | .500 | 18 | – | 16 | .529 |
| Boston College | 7 | – | 11 | .389 | 17 | – | 14 | .548 |
| Providence | 6 | – | 12 | .333 | 14 | – | 17 | .452 |
| Miami | 1 | – | 17 | .056 | 8 | – | 24 | .250 |
† 1992 Big East tournament winner As of April 6, 1992; Rankings from AP Poll

The 1992 Big East men's basketball tournament took place at Madison Square Garden in New York City, from March 12 to March 15, 1992. Its winner received the Big East Conference's automatic bid to the 1992 NCAA tournament. It is a single-elimination tournament with four rounds. With the addition of Miami to the conference, 1992 was the first time the tournament included ten teams. Seton Hall, Georgetown and St. John's all finished with the best regular season conference record. Through tiebreakers, Seton Hall was awarded the #1 seed.

Syracuse defeated Georgetown in the championship game 56–54, to claim its third Big East tournament championship.

== Bracket ==
First round March 12, 1992
8 | Boston College | 78
9 | Providence | 68
7 | Pittsburgh | 71
10 | Miami | 83

Quarterfinals; March 13, 1992
1 | #15 Seton Hall | 62
8 | Boston College | 60
4 | Villanova | 52
5 | Syracuse | 55
3 | #25 St. John's | 64^{OT}
6 | Connecticut | 59
2 | #21 Georgetown | 77
10 | Miami | 64

Semifinals; March 14, 1992
1 | #15 Seton Hall | 66
5 | Syracuse | 70
3 | #25 St. John's | 64
2 | #21 Georgetown | 68

Championship Game; March 15, 1992
5 | Syracuse | 56
2 | #21 Georgetown | 54

== Awards ==
Dave Gavitt Trophy (Most Valuable Player): Alonzo Mourning, Georgetown

All Tournament Team

- Terry Dehere, Seton Hall
- Dave Johnson, Syracuse
- Lawrence Moten, Syracuse
- Alonzo Mourning, Georgetown
- Malik Sealy, St. John's
- Jerome Scott, Miami
