= Ronny Thompson =

American basketball player-coach (born 1969)

Biographical details
- Born: April 7, 1969 (age 57); Washington, D.C., U.S.

Playing career
- 1988–1992: Georgetown
- Position: Guard

Coaching career (HC unless noted)
- 1993–1994: Oregon (assistant)
- 1994–1996: Loyola (MD) (assistant)
- 1996-1998: Philadelphia 76ers (assistant)
- 1998–2003: Georgetown (assistant)
- 2003–2006: Arkansas (assistant)
- 2006–2007: Ball State

Administrative career (AD unless noted)
- 2017–2023: Georgetown (chief of staff)

Head coaching record
- Overall: 9–22

Ronald Thompson (born April 7, 1969) is an American former college basketball player, coach, and broadcaster.

== Early years and education ==
Born in Washington, DC, Thompson spent his formative years on basketball courts in the Boys & Girls Clubs throughout the Washington metropolitan area. He contributed on Amateur Athletic Union (AAU) teams in the Washington, D.C, region and played high school basketball for coach Stu Vetter at Flint Hill School in Oakton, Virginia.

Thompson played college basketball at Georgetown University, where he was coached by his father, John Thompson. He graduated in 1992 with a degree in sociology.

== Career ==
=== Assistant coaching (1993-2006) ===
After a brief stint as a trading assistant with Prudential Securities in New York City, Thompson became an assistant coach. His coaching career began at the University of Oregon from 1993 to 1994, then with Loyola University in Maryland from 1994 to 1996. His career in professional sports began as a video coordinator for coach Larry Brown and the Philadelphia 76ers in 1996. Shortly afterward, he became a 76ers scout.

In 1998, Thompson returned to Georgetown as an assistant coach under his father from 1998 to 1999 and then under head coach Craig Esherick from 1999 to 2003. He then was an assistant coach at the University of Arkansas from 2003 to 2006.

=== Ball State (2006-2007) ===
Thompson accepted the head coaching job at Ball State University in April 2006. In his one season as coach of the Cardinals they finished a disappointing 9-22. During his tenure at Ball State Thompson coached a game against his older brother, John Thompson III, who was then the head coach at Georgetown.

==== Abrupt resignation ====
Following the season, controversy developed surrounding a potential NCAA investigation into the basketball coaching staff attending voluntary player workouts outside of the regulated practice dates. The Ball State newspaper reported that on Sunday, June 24, 2007, "men's basketball coach Ronny Thompson was greeted at his office with seven note cards that simply read 'liars, cheaters, [racial slur].'" Thompson resigned as men's basketball coach in July 2007, later claiming that he had been in a "racially hostile work environment." Ball State later exonerated Thompson of rules violations, apologized, and awarded him a $200,000 settlement. "In return, Thompson agreed to waive all claims he may have against the university and that nothing in the settlement constitutes an admission of liability or illegality by either party."

=== Later career (2007-present) ===
==== Broadcasting ====
Thompson joined Comcast SportsNet in 2007, offering pre-game/postgame analysis for the Washington Wizards and color commentary for college games. He hosted the series My Life 365 with Ron Thompson, which featured interviews with the preeminent athletes and media figures. His subjects included moguls Ted Leonsis and Sheila Johnson, former Duke University star Grant Hill, Georgetown teammate Alonzo Mourning, and legendary Hoyas player Allen Iverson; Thompson received a regional Emmy award for the latter interview.

Thompson also conducted a rare, exclusive interview with Los Angeles Lakers guard Kobe Bryant months before he helped the Lakers secure their seventeenth franchise title. In the summer of 2010, Thompson served as director of the Kobe Bryant/Nike Summer Basketball Camp which toured China.

Thompson has also been a contributor to NBA TV and occasionally served as guest-host for his father's The John Thompson Show, which was broadcast daily on-air and online on ESPN Radio until February 2012.

==== Return to Georgetown ====
In July 2017, following the hiring of Patrick Ewing as the head basketball coach at Georgetown, it was announced that Thompson would be rejoining the Hoyas' coaching staff. During Ewing's tenure as head coach, Thompson was the program's chief of staff. Thompson left Georgetown after Ewing's 2023 firing.

== Personal life ==
Thompson is the son of Gwen Thompson and former Georgetown University head coach John Thompson. He has two siblings, Tiffany and John Thompson III, the latter of whom is also a former Georgetown head coach.

== Head coaching record ==
Record table
Season	Team	Overall	Conference	Standing	Postseason
Ball State Cardinals (Mid-American Conference) (2006–2007)
2006–07	Ball State	9–22	5–11	5th (West)	
Ball State:		9–22 (.290)	5–11 (.313)		
Total:		9–22 (.290)			

== See also ==
- John Thompson
- John Thompson III
- 1988–89 Georgetown Hoyas men's basketball team
- 1989–90 Georgetown Hoyas men's basketball team
- 1990–91 Georgetown Hoyas men's basketball team
- 1991–92 Georgetown Hoyas men's basketball team
