= 1991–92 Syracuse Orangemen basketball team =

American college basketball season

1991–92 Syracuse Orangemen basketball

Big East tournament champions

NCAA tournament, Second round
- Conference: Big East Conference

Ranking
- Coaches: No. 20
- AP: No. 21
- Record: 22–10 (10–8 Big East)
- Head coach: Jim Boeheim (16th season)
- Assistant coaches: Bernie Fine (16th season); Wayne Morgan (8th season)
- Home arena: Carrier Dome

1991–92 Big East men's basketball standings
	Conf.				Overall
Team	W		L	PCT	W		L	PCT
No. 19 Seton Hall	12	–	6	.667	23	–	9	.719
No. 22 Georgetown	12	–	6	.667	22	–	10	.688
St. John's	12	–	6	.667	19	–	11	.633
Villanova	11	–	7	.611	14	–	15	.483
No. 21 Syracuse†	10	–	8	.556	22	–	10	.688
Connecticut	10	–	8	.556	20	–	10	.667
Pittsburgh	9	–	9	.500	18	–	16	.529
Boston College	7	–	11	.389	17	–	14	.548
Providence	6	–	12	.333	14	–	17	.452
Miami	1	–	17	.056	8	–	24	.250
† 1992 Big East tournament winner As of April 6, 1992; Rankings from AP Poll

The 1991–92 Syracuse Orangemen basketball team represented Syracuse University in the 1991–92 NCAA Division I men's basketball season. The head coach was Jim Boeheim, serving for his 16th year. The team played home games at the Carrier Dome in Syracuse, New York. The team finished with a 22–10 (10–8) record, was Big East tournament champions, and advanced to second round of the NCAA tournament.

== Roster ==
1991–92 Syracuse Orange men's basketball team
Players
Coaches

Pos.	#	Name	Height	Weight	Year	Hometown
G	3	Steve Keating	6 ft 4 in (1.93 m)	185 lb (84 kg)	Fr	Scranton, Pennsylvania
SF	4	Dave Johnson	6 ft 7 in (2.01 m)	200 lb (91 kg)	Sr	Morgan City, Louisiana
F	11	Todd Barlok	6 ft 4 in (1.93 m)	204 lb (93 kg)	Sr	Bristol, Connecticut
PG	12	Michael Edwards	5 ft 10 in (1.78 m)	160 lb (73 kg)	Jr	Voorhees, New Jersey
PF	13	Conrad McRae	6 ft 10 in (2.08 m)	215 lb (98 kg)	Jr	Brooklyn, New York
PG	15	Adrian Autry	6 ft 4 in (1.93 m)	207 lb (94 kg)	So	Monroe, North Carolina
SG	21	Lawrence Moten	6 ft 5 in (1.96 m)	180 lb (82 kg)	Fr	Washington, D.C.
PG	23	Vinnie Cohen	5 ft 8 in (1.73 m)	175 lb (79 kg)	Sr	Washington, D.C.
C	24	Dave Siock	6 ft 10 in (2.08 m)	240 lb (109 kg)	Jr	Vestal, New York
G	31	Anthony Harris	6 ft 1 in (1.85 m)	215 lb (98 kg)	Fr	Danbury, Connecticut
SG	33	Mike Hopkins	6 ft 5 in (1.96 m)	—	Jr	San Mateo, California
G/F	34	Luke Jackson	6 ft 6 in (1.98 m)	205 lb (93 kg)	Fr	Beaumont, Texas
G/F	35	Scott McCorkle	6 ft 5 in (1.96 m)	225 lb (102 kg)	So	Mission Viejo, California
F	50	Glenn Sekunda	6 ft 7 in (2.01 m)	215 lb (98 kg)	Fr	Parsippany-Troy Hills, New Jersey

Head coach

- Jim Boeheim (Syracuse)

Assistant coach(es)

- Bernie Fine (Syracuse)
- Wayne Morgan (St. Lawrence)

Legend

- (C) Team captain
- (S) Suspended
- (I) Ineligible
- (W) Walk-on
- Injured
- Current redshirt

Roster
Last update: 2020-Jan-25

== Schedule and results ==
Date time, TV	Rank^{#}	Opponent^{#}	Result	Record	Site city, state
Nov 26, 1991*		Cornell	W 78–71	1–0	Carrier Dome; Syracuse, NY
Nov 30, 1991*		UNC Asheville	W 83–68	2–0	Carrier Dome; Syracuse, NY
Dec 3, 1991*		vs. Florida State; Big East–ACC Challenge	W 89–71	3–0	Omni Coliseum; Atlanta, GA
Dec 6, 1991*		Eastern Kentucky	W 84–78	4–0	Carrier Dome; Syracuse, NY
Dec 7, 1991*		Saint Joseph's	W 72–70	5–0	Carrier Dome; Syracuse, NY
Dec 14, 1991*		TCU	W 89–72	6–0	Carrier Dome; Syracuse, NY
Dec 21, 1991*		Lafayette	W 87–58	7–0	Carrier Dome; Syracuse, NY
Dec 30, 1991*	No. 23	Wichita State	W 88–63	8–0	Carrier Dome; Syracuse, NY
Jan 2, 1992	No. 23	at Boston College	W 100–90	9–0 (1–0)	Silvio O. Conte Forum
Jan 4, 1992	No. 23	Providence	W 79–66	10–0 (2–0)	Carrier Dome; Syracuse, NY
Jan 8, 1992	No. 20	at Pittsburgh	L 74–83	10–1 (2–1)	Fitzgerald Field House; Pittsburgh, PA
Jan 11, 1992	No. 20	Miami (FL)	W 73–57	11–1 (3–1)	Carrier Dome; Syracuse, NY
Jan 15, 1992	No. 20	at No. 22 Georgetown; Rivalry	W 74–62	12–1 (4–1)	Capital Centre; Landover, MD
Jan 18, 1992	No. 20	Pittsburgh	W 83–79	13–1 (5–1)	Carrier Dome; Syracuse, NY
Jan 21, 1992	No. 13	at Villanova	L 60–70	13–2 (5–2)	The Pavilion
Jan 25, 1992	No. 13	No. 22 St. John's	W 58–56	14–2 (6–2)	Carrier Dome; Syracuse, NY
Jan 28, 1992	No. 12	at Providence	L 73–87	14–3 (6–3)	Dunkin' Donuts Center; Providence, RI
Feb 1, 1992	No. 12	Seton Hall	W 70–67	15–3 (7–3)	Carrier Dome; Syracuse, NY
Feb 3, 1992	No. 13	No. 10 Connecticut	W 84–83	16–3 (8–3)	Carrier Dome; Syracuse, NY
Feb 11, 1992	No. 10	at No. 25 Seton Hall	L 76–86	16–4 (8–4)	Brendan Byrne Arena; East Rutherford, NJ
Feb 15, 1992*	No. 10	Notre Dame	L 98–101	16–5	Carrier Dome; Syracuse, NY
Feb 19, 1992	No. 17	at No. 24 St. John's	L 62–63	16–6 (8–5)	Madison Square Garden; New York, NY
Feb 23, 1992	No. 17	No. 25 Georgetown; Rivalry	L 68–72	16–7 (8–6)	Carrier Dome; Syracuse, NY
Feb 25, 1992	No. 22	Boston College	W 76–70	17–7 (9–6)	Carrier Dome; Syracuse, NY
Feb 29, 1992	No. 22	at Miami (FL)	W 68–63	18–7 (10–6)	Miami Arena; Miami, FL
Mar 4, 1992	No. 24	at Connecticut	L 78–85	18–8 (10–7)	Harry A. Gampel Pavilion
Mar 8, 1992	No. 24	Villanova	L 56–76	18–9 (10–8)	Carrier Dome; Syracuse, NY
Big East tournament
Mar 13, 1992		vs. Villanova; Quarterfinal	W 55–52	19–9	Madison Square Garden; New York, NY
Mar 14, 1992		vs. No. 15 Seton Hall; Semifinal	W 70–66	20–9	Madison Square Garden; New York, NY
Mar 15, 1992		vs. No. 21 Georgetown; Final/Rivalry	W 56–54	21–9	Madison Square Garden; New York, NY
NCAA tournament
Mar 20, 1992*	(6 E) No. 21	vs. (11 E) Princeton; First round	W 51–43	22–9	Centrum in Worcester; Worcester, MA
Mar 22, 1992*	(6 E) No. 21	vs. (3 E) No. 17 Massachusetts; Second round	L 71–77 ^{OT}	22–10	Centrum in Worcester; Worcester, MA
*Non-conference game. ^{#}Rankings from AP. (#) Tournament seedings in parentheses. E=East. All times are in EST.

== 1992 NBA draft ==
Round	Pick	Player	NBA club
1	26	Dave Johnson	Portland Trail Blazers
