= 1991–92 Georgetown Hoyas men's basketball team =

American college basketball season

1991–92 Georgetown Hoyas men's basketball

Big East regular season co-champions

NCAA tournament, second round
- Conference: Big East Conference

Ranking
- Coaches: No. 18
- AP: No. 22
- Record: 22–10 (12–6 Big East)
- Head coach: John Thompson (20th season)
- Assistant coaches: Craig Esherick (10th season); Mike Riley (10th season); Mel Reid (2nd season)
- Captains: Alonzo Mourning; Ronny Thompson
- Home arena: Capital Centre

1991–92 Big East men's basketball standings
	Conf.				Overall
Team	W		L	PCT	W		L	PCT
No. 19 Seton Hall	12	–	6	.667	23	–	9	.719
No. 22 Georgetown	12	–	6	.667	22	–	10	.688
St. John's	12	–	6	.667	19	–	11	.633
Villanova	11	–	7	.611	14	–	15	.483
No. 21 Syracuse†	10	–	8	.556	22	–	10	.688
Connecticut	10	–	8	.556	20	–	10	.667
Pittsburgh	9	–	9	.500	18	–	16	.529
Boston College	7	–	11	.389	17	–	14	.548
Providence	6	–	12	.333	14	–	17	.452
Miami	1	–	17	.056	8	–	24	.250
† 1992 Big East tournament winner As of April 6, 1992; Rankings from AP Poll

The 1991–92 Georgetown Hoyas men's basketball team represented Georgetown University in the 1991–92 NCAA Division I college basketball season. John Thompson, coached them in his 20th season as head coach. They played their home games at the Capital Centre in Landover, Maryland. They were members of the Big East Conference and finished the season with a record of 22–10, 12–6 in Big East play, sharing the regular-season conference championship with Seton Hall and St. John's. Their record earned them a bye in the first round of the 1992 Big East men's basketball tournament, and they advanced to the final before losing to Syracuse. They were the No. 6 seed in the West Region of the 1992 NCAA Division I men's basketball tournament – the last of 14 consecutive Georgetown NCAA tournament appearances – and advanced to the second round before losing to West Region No. 3 seed Florida State. They were ranked No. 22 in the season's final Associated Press Poll and No. 18 in the final Coaches' Poll.

== Season recap ==
Georgetown's starting lineup of senior center and team co-captain Alonzo Mourning, sophomore forward Robert Churchwell, senior forward Brian Kelly, sophomore point guard Joey Brown, and freshman guard Irvin Church was so acclaimed that observers picked the Hoyas as a co-favorite to win the 1991-92 Big East regular-season title. With Dikembe Mutombo having graduated in May 1991, Mourning was now Georgetown's sole "big man," and he led the team, starting and scoring in double figures in all 32 games and collecting rebounds in double figures in 22 games. He led the team in scoring in 27 games and in rebounding in 26.

In the first game of the year, Mourning had his second career triple double with 32 points, 14 rebounds, and 10 blocked shots against Hawaii Loa in the Hawaii Loa Classic. Over the next two weeks, he fell just short of two more triple doubles, with 21 points, 22 rebounds, and nine blocked shots against Delaware State and 25 points, 14 rebounds, and five blocked shots in only 27 minutes of play against the University of the District of Columbia. He fell just short of a triple double again in the first Big East game of the year, with 24 points, 15 rebounds, and eight blocked shots against Villanova at the Capital Centre on January 4, 1992. He followed that up with 28 points and 12 rebounds against Providence and 23 points and 11 rebounds against Seton Hall. In the 16 Big East games Georgetown played during the regular season, Mourning averaged 20.7 points and 10.9 rebounds a game, and his expertise in shooting free throws was an important part of the Hoyas' offense. His career-high 38-point performance in a double-overtime loss at Boston College included scoring on a school-record 18 free throws as he shot 69.2% from the free throw line in 26 attempts. Three days later, in a rematch in which the Hoyas upset Villanova, he again almost had a triple double against the Wildcats, scoring 26 points, grabbing 11 rebounds, and blocking seven shots as well as shooting 14-for-15 (93.3%) from the free-throw line.

Churchwell's sophomore season was virtually a repeat of his freshman year. He shot 49% from the field overall and 38% from three-point range, and he made 120 field goals and had 153 rebounds, an increase of six and one, respectively, from the year before. Although he had only one shot per 3 minutes 32 seconds of playing time, he averaged 9.6 points per game.

Brown improved his shooting from the field, from 23.1% the previous year to 35.2%, but made some of his biggest contributions on defense. On February 19, 1992, 25th-ranked Georgetown faced 21st-ranked Connecticut at the Capital Centre in an important game for the Hoyas for their chances both for a Big East regular season championship and for an NCAA tournament bid. The game was tied 58–58 with 13 seconds left to play and the Huskies holding the ball for the final shot when Brown stole a Connecticut pass and made a layup at the buzzer to give the Hoyas a 60–58 last-second upset win. At 17th-ranked Syracuse four days later, Brown scored 23 points to lead Georgetown to another upset win. Against Pittsburgh at the Capital Centre in the regular-season finale, he had a 17-point effort in a win that tied Georgetown with Seton Hall and St. John's for the regular-season Big East championship.

After a bye in the first round, Georgetown defeated Miami in the quarterfinals of the 1992 Big East tournament and St. John's in the semifinals. In the final game, the Hoyas met archrival Syracuse. The Hoyas fell 11 points behind the Orangemen in the second half, but the Hoyas, led by Mourning's 23 points, came back to tie the game with 24 seconds left to play. Unfortunately for the Hoyas, Syracuse senior forward Dave Johnson connected on a shot with four seconds left to give the Orangemen a 54–52 win. It was Syracuse's first defeat of Georgetown in a Big East tournament championship game in four tries. Mourning scored 76 points and 22 rebounds during the tournament, averaging 25.3 points per game, and was named the tournament's Most Valuable Player, becoming the first player ever named the Big East's Player of the Year, Defensive Player of the Year, and Tournament MVP in the same season, and only the second Tournament MVP from a team that did not win the tournament.

The Hoyas were the No. 6 seed in the West Region of the 1992 NCAA Division I men's basketball tournament – the last of 14 consecutive Georgetown NCAA Tournament appearances. In the first round, they defeated South Florida, with Mourning scoring 21 points and pulling down 11 rebounds. They met the West Region No. 3 seed, 20th-ranked Florida State, in the second round. The Seminoles largely denied Mourning the ball, and in the last game of his collegiate career he had only three rebounds and seven field goal attempts, making four of them. Meanwhile, Florida State junior point guard Sam Cassell scored 19 points and sophomore forward Doug Edwards had 15 points and 16 rebounds, and the Seminoles defeated the Hoyas 78–68 in one of the biggest wins in Florida State basketball history. It was the third straight season that Georgetown had been eliminated in the second round of the NCAA Tournament. The Hoyas were ranked No. 22 in the season's final Associated Press Poll and No. 18 in the final Coaches' Poll.

During the season, Mourning had averaged 21.3 points, 10.7 rebounds, and 5.0 blocked shots per game, shooting 59.5% from the field and 75.9% from the free-throw line. He graduated in May 1992 as one of the greatest players in Georgetown men's basketball history. During his four-year career, he had averaged 16.6 points, 8.6 rebounds, and 3.8 blocked shots per game. Still, he had never led his team to a Final Four appearance, even with Dikembe Mutombo as his teammate the first three seasons. This was largely because an unusually high number of scholarship players – 11 of 23 – transferred from Georgetown between 1987–1988 and 1992–1993, preventing the team from building a core of veterans to play with its two dominating centers. Without that core of veterans, the Mourning-Mutombo teams were unable to replicate the success of the veteran-filled Patrick Ewing teams of the early 1980s, which had reached the Final Four – and indeed the national championship game – three times in four seasons.

== Roster ==
Senior guard Ronny Thompson was the son of head coach John Thompson, Jr.

#	Name	Height	Weight (lbs.)	Position	Class	Hometown	Previous Team(s)
4	John Jacques	6'3"	175	F	Fr.	Delco, NC, U.S.	Acme-Delco HS
10	Joey Brown	5'10"	185	G	So.	Morgan City, LA, U.S.	Morgan City HS
11	Irvin Church	6'1"	185	G	Fr.	Riverdale, MD, U.S.	Parkdale HS
21	Lonnie Harrell	6'6"	179	G/F	Fr.	Washington, DC, U.S.	Eastern HS
22	Robert Churchwell	6'6"	200	F	So.	South Bend, IN, U.S.	Gonzaga College HS (D.C.)
24	Vladimir Bosanac	6'9"	180	F	So.	Belgrade, Yugoslavia	Second Economic School
30	Ronny Thompson	6'4"	180	G	Sr.	Washington, DC, U.S.	Flint Hill School (Oakton, VA)
32	Kevin Millen	6'6"	185	F	Fr.	Memphis, TN, U.S.	Raleigh-Egypt HS
33	Alonzo Mourning	6'10"	240	C	Sr.	Chesapeake, VA, U.S.	Indian River HS
34	Lamont Morgan	6'3"	175	G	Fr.	Washington, DC, U.S.	Gonzaga College HS
40	Brian Kelly	6'6"	230	F	Sr.	Cincinnati, OH, U.S.	Cincinnati State Technical and Community College
43	Derrick Patterson	6'6"	200	F	Fr.	Chicago, IL, U.S.	Dunbar Vocational HS
50	Pascal Fleury	7'2"	220	C	So.	Saint-Jean-sur-Richelieu, Quebec, Canada	Dawson College Prep
52	Don Reid	6'8"	250	F	Fr.	Largo, MD, U.S.	Largo HS

== Rankings ==
Ranking movement Legend: ██ Improvement in ranking. ██ Decrease in ranking. ██ Not ranked the previous week. RV=Others receiving votes.
Poll	Pre	Wk 1	Wk 2	Wk 3	Wk 4	Wk 5	Wk 6	Wk 7	Wk 8	Wk 9	Wk 10	Wk 11	Wk 12	Wk 13	Wk 14	Wk 15	Wk 16	Final
AP	16	17	18	23	23	24	22		22					25	18	17	21	22
Coaches	14	16	16	20	21	24	21		23						17	14	19	18

== 1991–92 Schedule and results ==
Sources

- All times are Eastern

Date time, TV	Rank^{#}	Opponent^{#}	Result	Record	Site (attendance) city, state
Regular Season
Wed., Nov. 27, 1991*	No. 17	vs. Hawaii Loa; Hawaii Loa Classic	W 101–76	1–0	Kaneohe Armory (403); Kaneohe, HI
Fri., Nov. 29, 1991*	No. 17	vs. Hawaii Pacific; Hawaii Loa Classic	W 95–65	2–0	Kaneohe Armory (650); Kaneohe, HI
Thu., Dec. 5, 1991*	No. 18	vs. Virginia; ACC-Big East Challenge	L 66–76	2–1	Greensboro Coliseum (15,781); Greensboro, NC
Mon., Dec. 9, 1991*	No. 23	Delaware State	W 93–76	3–1	Capital Centre (N/A); Landover, MD
Sat., Dec. 14, 1991*	No. 23	District of Columbia	W 98–48	4–1	Capital Centre (N/A); Landover, MD
Wed., Dec. 18, 1991*	No. 23	Saint Leo	W 89–51	5–1	Capital Centre (N/A); Landover, MD
Sat., Dec. 21, 1991*	No. 23	Maryland Eastern Shore	W 79–37	6–1	Capital Centre (4,727); Landover, MD
Sun., Dec. 29, 1991*	No. 24	vs. Bethune-Cookman	W 89–54	7–1	Florida Suncoast Dome (7,563); St. Petersburg, FL
Sat., Jan. 4, 1992	No. 22	Villanova	L 73–75	7–2 (0–1)	Capital Centre (8,943); Landover, MD
Mon., Jan. 6, 1992		at Providence	W 70–63	8–2 (1–1)	Providence Civic Center (13,106); Providence, RI
Sat., Jan. 11, 1992		Seton Hall	W 73–65	9–2 (2–1)	Capital Centre (10,018); Landover, MD
Wed., Jan. 15, 1992; 7:00 p.m.	No. 22	No. 20 Syracuse; Rivalry	L 62–74	9–3 (2–2)	Capital Centre (15,141); Landover, MD
Sat., Jan. 18, 1992*		at DePaul	L 62–72	9–4	Rosemont Horizon (N/A); Rosemont, IL
Wed., Jan. 22, 1992		at Pittsburgh	W 63–59	10–4 (3–2)	Civic Arena (16,489); Pittsburgh, PA
Sat., Jan. 25, 1992		Miami	W 60–40	11–4 (4–2)	Capital Centre (11,217); Landover, MD
Wed., Jan. 29, 1992		St. John's	W 61–48	12–4 (5–2)	Capital Centre (10,109); Landover, MD
Sat., Feb. 1, 1992		at Boston College	L 86–88 ^{2OT}	12–5 (5–3)	Silvio O. Conte Forum (8,606); Chestnut Hill, MA
Tue., Feb. 4, 1992		at Villanova	W 71–63	13–5 (6–3)	Spectrum (15,053); Philadelphia, PA
Sat., Feb. 8, 1992		Providence	L 63–86	13-6 (6–4)	Capital Centre (12,109); Landover, MD
Wed., Feb. 12, 1992		at No. 18 Connecticut; Rivalry	W 70–63	14-6 (7–4)	Hartford Civic Center (16,294); Hartford, CT
Sat., Feb. 15, 1992		at Miami	W 75–58	15–6 (8–4)	Miami Arena (10,896); Miami, FL
Wed., Feb. 19, 1992	No. 25	No. 21 Connecticut; Rivalry	W 60–58	16–6 (9–4)	Capital Centre (13,106); Landover, MD
Sun., Feb. 23, 1992; 12:00 noon	No. 25	at No. 17 Syracuse; Rivalry	W 72–68	17–6 (10–4)	Carrier Dome (32,996); Syracuse, NY
Wed., Feb. 26, 1992	No. 18	at Seton Hall	L 71–76 ^{OT}	17–7 (10–5)	Brendan Byrne Arena (17,049); East Rutherford, NJ
Sat., Feb 29, 1992	No. 18	Boston College	W 68–54	18–7 (11–5)	Capital Centre (14,649); Landover, MD
Mon., Mar. 2, 1992	No. 17	at St. John's	L 49–65	18–8 (11–6)	Madison Square Garden (16,816); New York, NY
Sat., Mar. 7, 1992	No. 17	Pittsburgh	W 67–57	19–8 (12–6)	Capital Centre (14,478); Landover, MD
Big East tournament
Fri., Mar. 13, 1992	(2) No. 21	vs. (10) Miami; Quarterfinals	W 77–64	20–8	Madison Square Garden (18,897); New York, NY
Sat., Mar. 14, 1992	(2) No. 21	vs. (3) No. 25 St. John's; Semifinals	W 68–64	21–8	Madison Square Garden (18,897); New York, NY
Sun., Mar. 15, 1992; 1:00 p.m.	(2) No. 21	vs. (5) Syracuse; Championship/Rivalry	L 54–56	21–9	Madison Square Garden (18,483); New York, NY
NCAA tournament
Thu., Mar. 19, 1992	(6 W) No. 22	vs. (11 W) South Florida; First round	W 75–60	22–9	BSU Pavilion (11,300); Boise, ID
Fri., Mar. 20, 1992	(6 W) No. 22	vs. (3 W) No. 20 Florida State; Second round	L 68–78	22–10	BSU Pavilion (12,200); Boise, ID
*Non-conference game. ^{#}Rankings from AP Poll. (#) Tournament seedings in parentheses.
