= 1991–92 Seton Hall Pirates men's basketball team =

American college basketball season

1991–92 Seton Hall Pirates men's basketball

Big East Regular season co-champions

NCAA tournament, Sweet 16
- Conference: Big East Conference

Ranking
- Coaches: No. 19
- AP: No. 19
- Record: 23–9 (12–6 Big East)
- Head coach: P. J. Carlesimo (10th season)
- Home arena: Brendan Byrne Arena

1991–92 Big East men's basketball standings
	Conf.				Overall
Team	W		L	PCT	W		L	PCT
No. 19 Seton Hall	12	–	6	.667	23	–	9	.719
No. 22 Georgetown	12	–	6	.667	22	–	10	.688
St. John's	12	–	6	.667	19	–	11	.633
Villanova	11	–	7	.611	14	–	15	.483
No. 21 Syracuse†	10	–	8	.556	22	–	10	.688
Connecticut	10	–	8	.556	20	–	10	.667
Pittsburgh	9	–	9	.500	18	–	16	.529
Boston College	7	–	11	.389	17	–	14	.548
Providence	6	–	12	.333	14	–	17	.452
Miami	1	–	17	.056	8	–	24	.250
† 1992 Big East tournament winner As of April 6, 1992; Rankings from AP Poll

The 1991–92 Seton Hall Pirates men's basketball team represented Seton Hall University during the 1991–92 NCAA men's college basketball season. The Pirates were led by tenth-year head coach P.J. Carlesimo. They finished with an overall record of 23–9 (12–6 Big East). Seton Hall grabbed an at-large bid to the 1992 NCAA Tournament. As a #4 seed, the Pirates opened with victories over LaSalle and Missouri. In the Sweet Sixteen, Seton Hall fell to the eventual National Champions Duke 81–69.

== Roster ==
1991–92 Seton Hall Pirates men's basketball team
Players
Coaches

Pos.	#	Name	Height	Weight	Year	Previous school	Hometown
G	15	Dan Hurley	6 ft 2 in (1.88 m)	—	Fr	St. Anthony HS	Jersey City, New Jersey
F	21	Jerry Walker	6 ft 7 in (2.01 m)	—	Jr
F	22	Gordon Winchester	6 ft 7 in (2.01 m)	—	Sr
G	24	Terry Dehere	6 ft 2 in (1.88 m)	185 lb (84 kg)	Jr	St. Anthony	Jersey City, New Jersey
C	50	Luther Wright	7 ft 2 in (2.18 m)	255 lb (116 kg)	So	Elizabeth HS	Jersey City, New Jersey
F	55	Artūras Karnišovas	6 ft 8 in (2.03 m)	220 lb (100 kg)	So

Head coach

- P. J. Carlesimo

Assistant coach(es)

Legend

- (C) Team captain
- (S) Suspended
- (I) Ineligible
- (W) Walk-on
- Injured
- Current redshirt

Roster

== Schedule and results ==
Date time, TV	Rank^{#}	Opponent^{#}	Result	Record	Site (attendance) city, state
Regular season
Nov 22, 1992*	No. 9	St. Francis (NY)	W 99–78	1–0	Brendan Byrne Arena (3,200); East Rutherford, NJ
Dec 4, 1992*	No. 6	No. 5 North Carolina	L 54–83	1–1	Brendan Byrne Arena; East Rutherford, NJ
Jan 20, 1992		No. 22 St. John's	W 75–60	9–5 (3–4)	Brendan Byrne Arena; East Rutherford, NJ
Jan 26, 1992*		No. 6 Ohio State	W 68–64	10–5	Brendan Byrne Arena; East Rutherford, NJ
Mar 7, 1992	No. 22	at St. John's	W 75–60	19–7 (12–6)	Madison Square Garden; New York, NY
Big East Tournament
Mar 13, 1992*	No. 15	vs. Boston College; Big East Tournament Quarterfinal	W 62–60	20–7	Madison Square Garden; New York, NY
Mar 14, 1992*	No. 15	vs. Syracuse; Big East Tournament Semifinal	L 66–70	20–8	Madison Square Garden; New York, NY
NCAA Tournament
Mar 19, 1992*	(4 E) No. 19	vs. (13 E) La Salle; First round	W 78–76	22–8	Greensboro Coliseum; Greensboro, NC
Mar 21, 1992*	(4 E) No. 19	vs. (5 E) No. 16 Missouri; Second Round	W 88–71	23–8	Greensboro Coliseum; Greensboro, NC
Mar 26, 1992*	(4 E) No. 19	vs. (1 E) No. 1 Duke; Sweet 16 – East Regional semifinal	L 69–81	23–9	The Spectrum (17,878); Philadelphia, PA
*Non-conference game. ^{#}Rankings from AP Poll. (#) Tournament seedings in parentheses. E=East.
