= Eddie McCarter =

American basketball player and coach (born 1953)

Biographical details
- Born: August 3, 1953 (age 73); Birmingham, Alabama, U.S.
- Education: UAB (1975)

Coaching career (HC unless noted)
- ???: Fairfield Prep (assistant)
- ???: Howard JC (assistant)
- 1981–1990: Charles Henderson HS
- 1990–1992: UT Arlington (assistant)
- 1992–2006: UT Arlington
- 2006–2007: UAB (assistant)
- 2007–2011: West Alabama
- 2011–2014: Arkansas-Pine Bluff (assistant)
- 2014–2018: North Alabama (assistant)
- 2018–2022: Shelton State CC (assistant)

Head coaching record
- Overall: 226–272 (.454) (college)

Edward Louis McCarter (born August 3, 1953) is an American basketball coach who was most recently an assistant coach for Shelton State.

== Coaching career ==
McCarter begain his coaching career at Fairfield High School as an assistant coach, he then went to coach at Howard Junior College before getting a head coaching job at Charles Henderson High School, he coached at Charles Henderson for nines years achieving an 188–77 record. The teams he compiled three trips to the state tournament including a berth to the 1987 championship game. To add on, his teams won four area championships, four South Alabama tournament titles, three South Alabama conference titles, and tacking on a pair of regional championships. For his performances he won the South Alabama coach of the year five times. Next he was hired at UT Arlington as an assistant coach for two years before being promoted to head coach. He would serve as UT Arlington's head coach for 14 years amassing a record of 179–211. He was the Southland Regular Season Champion once in 2004. On March 9, 2006, he resigned as UT Arlington's head coach. From there he got an assistant coaching job at UAB for one season, before becoming West Alabama's head coach. At his time at West Alabama he went 47–61. After that he got assistant coaching jobs at Arkansas-Pine Bluff for three years and at North Alabama for four years. After that he was hired by Shelton State as an assistant where he spent four seasons as an assistant coach.
