= 1991–92 Pittsburgh Panthers men's basketball team =

American college basketball season

1991–92 Pittsburgh Panthers men's basketball

NIT, Second Round, L 74–77 vs. Florida
- Conference: Big East Conference (1979–2013)
- Record: 18–16 (9–9 Big East)
- Head coach: Paul Evans (6th season)
- Assistant coaches: Norm Law (6th season); Mark Coleman (6th season); John Sarandrea (4th season)
- Home arena: Fitzgerald Field House (Capacity: 4,122)

1991–92 Big East men's basketball standings
| | Conf. | | | | Overall |
| Team | W | | L | PCT | W | | L | PCT |
|---|---|---|---|---|---|---|---|---|
| No. 19 Seton Hall | 12 | – | 6 | .667 | 23 | – | 9 | .719 |
| No. 22 Georgetown | 12 | – | 6 | .667 | 22 | – | 10 | .688 |
| St. John's | 12 | – | 6 | .667 | 19 | – | 11 | .633 |
| Villanova | 11 | – | 7 | .611 | 14 | – | 15 | .483 |
| No. 21 Syracuse† | 10 | – | 8 | .556 | 22 | – | 10 | .688 |
| Connecticut | 10 | – | 8 | .556 | 20 | – | 10 | .667 |
| Pittsburgh | 9 | – | 9 | .500 | 18 | – | 16 | .529 |
| Boston College | 7 | – | 11 | .389 | 17 | – | 14 | .548 |
| Providence | 6 | – | 12 | .333 | 14 | – | 17 | .452 |
| Miami | 1 | – | 17 | .056 | 8 | – | 24 | .250 |
† 1992 Big East tournament winner As of April 6, 1992; Rankings from AP Poll

The 1991–92 Pittsburgh Panthers men's basketball team represented the University of Pittsburgh in the 1991–92 NCAA Division I men's basketball season. Led by head coach Paul Evans, the Panthers finished with a record of 18–16. They received an invite to the 1992 National Invitation Tournament where they lost in the second round to Florida.
