= Gib Chapman =

American basketball coach and athletic director

Biographical details
- Born: March 7, 1936 (age 90); Houlton, Maine
- Education: University of Maine

Coaching career (HC unless noted)

Men's basketball
- 1957–1958: Danforth HS (ME)
- 1959–1960: Perth Regional HS (NB)
- 1960–1967: Ricker
- 1967–1973: Acadia
- 1979–1982: Guelph
- 1986–1989: Toronto
- 1992–1996: New Hampshire

Administrative career (AD unless noted)
- 1960–1967: Ricker
- 1968–1979: Acadia
- 1979–1982: Guelph
- 1982–1989: Toronto
- 1989–1996: New Hampshire (Men's AD)

Head coaching record
- Overall: 38–6 (.864) (High school); 188–44 (.810) (U Sports); 46–64 (.418) (NCAA)

Accomplishments and honors

Championships
- 1x U Sports men's basketball championship champion (1971)

Gilbert W. Chapman (born March 8, 1936) is an American coach and administrator who was head basketball coach and athletic director at Acadia University, University of Guelph, the University of Toronto, and the University of New Hampshire.

== Early life ==
Chapman graduated from Ricker Junior College. After military service, he enrolled in the University of Maine, where he earned a Bachelor of Science degree in physical education in 1960.

== Coaching ==
=== High school ===
Chapman began his coaching career in 1957 at Danforth High School in Danforth, Maine. During the 1959–60 season he coached at Perth Regional High School in Perth, New Brunswick. His overall record at the high school level was 38–6.

=== Ricker College ===
From 1960 to 1967, Chapman was the head men's basketball coach at Ricker College, where he compiled a 107–30 record. He was also the school's athletic director and in 1963, the college was accepted as an associate member of the National Collegiate Athletic Association.

=== Acadia University ===
In 1967, Chapman was named varsity men's basketball and soccer coach at Acadia University. The following year, he was promoted to head of the physical education department and director of athletics while continuing to coach basketball. His 1968–69 team, led by Brian Heaney, made it to the semi-finals of the Canadian Intercollegiate Athletic Union national basketball championship tournament. The Axemen were able to win the tournament in 1971, which was held on Acadia's campus. Following the 1972–73 season, Chapman was named dean of the School of Recreation and Physical Education. His overall record at Acadia was 128–26.

=== University of Guelph ===
From 1979 to 1982, Chapman was the athletic director and men's basketball coach at Guelph. The team went 25–11 over three seasons and did not make the national tournament.

=== University of Toronto ===
In 1982, Chapman became director of athletics at the University of Toronto, succeeding the retiring Bud Fraser. He took over as head men's basketball coach in 1986 and led the team to a 35-7 record over three seasons. In 1989, he led the Varsity Blues to their first appearance in the national semifinals.

=== University of New Hampshire ===
Chapman returned to the United States in 1989 when he became men's athletic director at the University of New Hampshire. In 1992, he took on the dual role of men's basketball coach as a cost-saving measure during a university-wide hiring freeze. The Wildcats compiled a 46–64 record in four seasons under Chapman, including two winning seasons (1993–94 and 1994–95). Following the 1995–96 season, the positions of men's and women's athletic director were consolidated under Judy Ray and Chapman was fired as both men's basketball coach and men's athletic director.
