= 1991–92 Connecticut Huskies men's basketball team =

American college basketball season

1991–92 Connecticut Huskies men's basketball

NCAA Division I men's tournament, Round of 32
- Conference: Big East Conference
- Record: 20–10 (10–8 Big East)
- Head coach: Jim Calhoun (6th season)
- Assistant coaches: Howie Dickenman; Dave Leitao; Glen Miller; Steve Pikiell
- Home arena: Hartford Civic Center; Harry A. Gampel Pavilion

1991–92 Big East men's basketball standings
	Conf.				Overall
Team	W		L	PCT	W		L	PCT
No. 19 Seton Hall	12	–	6	.667	23	–	9	.719
No. 22 Georgetown	12	–	6	.667	22	–	10	.688
St. John's	12	–	6	.667	19	–	11	.633
Villanova	11	–	7	.611	14	–	15	.483
No. 21 Syracuse†	10	–	8	.556	22	–	10	.688
Connecticut	10	–	8	.556	20	–	10	.667
Pittsburgh	9	–	9	.500	18	–	16	.529
Boston College	7	–	11	.389	17	–	14	.548
Providence	6	–	12	.333	14	–	17	.452
Miami	1	–	17	.056	8	–	24	.250
† 1992 Big East tournament winner As of April 6, 1992; Rankings from AP Poll

The 1991–92 Connecticut Huskies men's basketball team represented the University of Connecticut in the 1991–92 collegiate men's basketball season. The Huskies completed the season with a 20–10 overall record. The Huskies were members of the Big East Conference where they finished with a 10–8 record. They made it to the Second Round in the 1992 NCAA Division I men's basketball tournament. The Huskies played their home games at Harry A. Gampel Pavilion in Storrs, Connecticut and the Hartford Civic Center in Hartford, Connecticut, and they were led by sixth-year head coach Jim Calhoun.

== Schedule ==
Date time, TV	Rank^{#}	Opponent^{#}	Result	Record	Site (attendance) city, state
Regular Season
11/22/1991*	No. 15	Hartford	W 76–46	1–0	Hartford Civic Center (16,184); Hartford, Connecticut
11/29/1991*	No. 15	Yale	W 79–55	2–0	Hartford Civic Center (16,184); Hartford, Connecticut
12/2/1991*; ESPN	No. 12	No. 23 Wake Forest; ACC/BIG EAST Challenge	W 84–75	3–0	Hartford Civic Center (13,169); Hartford, Connecticut
12/7/1991*	No. 12	Maine	W 85–71	4–0	Harry A. Gampel Pavilion (8,241); Storrs, Connecticut
12/14/1991*; ESPN	No. 8	at Texas	W 94–77	5–0	Frank Erwin Center (14,309); Austin, Texas
12/23/1991*	No. 5	Fairfield	W 89–59	6–0	Harry A. Gampel Pavilion (8,241); Storrs, Connecticut
12/27/1991*	No. 5	Central Connecticut; Connecticut Mutual Classic	W 112–58	7–0	Hartford Civic Center (16,024); Hartford, Connecticut
12/28/1991*; NESN	No. 5	Furman; Connecticut Mutual Classic	W 87–68	8–0	Hartford Civic Center (16,174); Hartford, Connecticut
1/2/1992; WTNH	No. 5	Miami	W 85–62	9–0 (1–0)	Harry A. Gampel Pavilion (8,241); Storrs, Connecticut
1/4/1992*; CBS	No. 5	at Illinois	W 70–66	10–0	Assembly Hall (12,376); Champaign, Illinois
1/7/1992; WTNH	No. 5	No. 17 St. John's	W 85–76	11–0 (2–0)	Harry A. Gampel Pavilion (8,241); Storrs, Connecticut
1/11/1992; WTNH	No. 5	at Villanova	L 70–79	11–1 (2–1)	The Pavilion (6,500); Villanova, Pennsylvania
1/14/1992; WTNH	No. 8	Pittsburgh	W 87–77	12–1 (3–1)	Hartford Civic Center (16,254); Hartford, Connecticut
1/18/1992; WTNH	No. 8	at Miami	W 77–58	13–1 (4–1)	Miami Arena (10,231); Miami, Florida
1/22/1992; ESPN	No. 7	at Providence	W 97–86 ^{OT}	14–1 (5–1)	Providence Civic Center (13,106); Providence, Rhode Island
1/25/1992; NESN	No. 7	Boston College	W 83–77 ^{OT}	15–1 (6–1)	Hartford Civic Center (16,294); Hartford, Connecticut
1/27/1992; ESPN	No. 6	Villanova	W 72–58	16–1 (7–1)	Harry A. Gampel Pavilion (8,241); Storrs, Connecticut
2/1/1992; CBS	No. 6	at St. John's	L 57–90	16–2 (7–2)	Madison Square Garden (19,876); New York City, New York
2/3/1992; ESPN	No. 10	at No. 13 Syracuse; Rivalry	L 83–84	16–3 (7–3)	Carrier Dome (27,347); Syracuse, New York
2/8/1992; WTNH	No. 10	Seton Hall	L 69–81	16–4 (7–4)	Harry A. Gampel Pavilion (8,241); Storrs, Connecticut
2/12/1992; WTNH	No. 18	Georgetown; Rivalry	L 63–70	16–5 (7–5)	Hartford Civic Center (16,294); Hartford, Connecticut
2/19/1992; WTNH	No. 21	at No. 25 Georgetown; Rivalry	L 58–60	16–6 (7–6)	Capital Centre (13,108); Landover, Maryland
2/22/1992; NESN	No. 21	Providence	W 94–73	17–6 (8–6)	Harry A. Gampel Pavilion (8,241); Storrs, Connecticut
2/25/1992; WTNH	No. 24	at Pittsburgh	L 77–86	17–7 (8–7)	Civic Arena (6,511); Pittsburgh, Pennsylvania
3/1/1992; CBS	No. 24	at No. 22 Seton Hall	L 64–77	17–8 (8–8)	Brendan Byrne Arena (20,029); East Rutherford, New Jersey
3/4/1992; ESPN		No. 21 Syracuse; Rivalry	W 85–78	18–8 (9–8)	Hartford Civic Center (16,294); Hartford, Connecticut
3/7/1992; WTNH		at Boston College	W 89–79	19–8 (10–8)	Conte Forum (8,606); Boston, Massachusetts
Big East tournament
3/12/1992; WTNH		vs. St. John's; Quarterfinals	L 59–64 ^{OT}	19–9	Madison Square Garden (18,899); New York City, New York
NCAA tournament
3/19/1992*; CBS	No. (9)	vs. No. (8) Nebraska; First Round	W 86–65	20–9	Riverfront Coliseum (10,002); Cincinnati, Ohio
3/21/1992*; CBS	No. (9)	vs. No. 3 (1) Ohio State; Second Round	L 55–78	20–10	Riverfront Coliseum (16,002); Cincinnati, Ohio
*Non-conference game. ^{#}Rankings from AP Poll. (#) Tournament seedings in parentheses. All times are in Eastern Time.

Schedule Source:
