= 1991–92 St. John's Redmen basketball team =

American college basketball season

1991–92 St. John's Redmen men's basketball

Big East Regular Season Co-Champions Lapchick Memorial Champions ECAC Holiday Festival Champions

NCAA men's Division I tournament, first round
- Conference: Big East Conference

Ranking
- Coaches: No. 23
- Record: 19–11 (12–6 Big East)
- Head coach: Lou Carnesecca
- Assistant coaches: Brian Mahoney; Al LoBalbo; Ron Rutledge
- Home arena: Alumni Hall; Madison Square Garden

1991–92 Big East men's basketball standings
	Conf.				Overall
Team	W		L	PCT	W		L	PCT
No. 19 Seton Hall	12	–	6	.667	23	–	9	.719
No. 22 Georgetown	12	–	6	.667	22	–	10	.688
St. John's	12	–	6	.667	19	–	11	.633
Villanova	11	–	7	.611	14	–	15	.483
No. 21 Syracuse†	10	–	8	.556	22	–	10	.688
Connecticut	10	–	8	.556	20	–	10	.667
Pittsburgh	9	–	9	.500	18	–	16	.529
Boston College	7	–	11	.389	17	–	14	.548
Providence	6	–	12	.333	14	–	17	.452
Miami	1	–	17	.056	8	–	24	.250
† 1992 Big East tournament winner As of April 6, 1992; Rankings from AP Poll

The 1991–92 St. John's Redmen basketball team represented St. John's University during the 1991–92 NCAA Division I men's basketball season. The team was coached by Lou Carnesecca in his twenty fourth and final season at the school. St. John's home games are played at Alumni Hall and Madison Square Garden and the team is a member of the Big East Conference.

== Off season ==
=== Departures ===
Name	Number	Pos.	Height	Weight	Year	Hometown	Notes
Billy Singleton	33	F	6'7"		Senior		Graduated
Sean Muto	50	C	7'0"		Senior		Graduated

=== Class of 1991 signees ===
College recruiting information
Name	Hometown	School	Height	Weight	Commit date
Derek Brown; SG	Franklin Square, NY	H. Frank Carey High School	6 ft 3 in (1.91 m)	N/A	
Derek Brown; SG	Recruit ratings: No ratings found				
Mitchell Foster; PF	Newark, NJ	Arizona Western College	6 ft 9 in (2.06 m)	N/A	
Mitchell Foster; PF	Recruit ratings: No ratings found				
Overall recruit ranking:
Note: In many cases, Scout, Rivals, 247Sports, On3, and ESPN may conflict in their listings of height and weight.; In these cases, the average was taken. ESPN grades are on a 100-point scale.; Sources: "1991 Team Ranking". Rivals.

== Roster ==
1991–92 St. John's Red Storm men's basketball team
Players
Coaches

Pos.	#	Name	Height	Weight	Year	Previous school	Hometown
F	3	Sergio Luyk (redshirt)	6 ft 7 in (2.01 m)	—	So	University Heights	Madrid, Spain
G	10	Terence Mullin	6 ft 0 in (1.83 m)	—	Sr	Xaverian	Brooklyn, NY
G	11	David Cain	6 ft 0 in (1.83 m)	—	Jr	Adlai E. Stevenson	Bronx, NY
G	12	Jason Buchanan	6 ft 2 in (1.88 m)	—	Sr	Nottingham	Syracuse, NY
G	13	Lee Green	6 ft 2 in (1.88 m)	—	So	Tolentine/Cheshire	Bronx, NY
F/C	15	Mitchell Foster	6 ft 9 in (2.06 m)	—	Jr	Arizona Western	Newark, NJ
F	21	Malik Sealy	6 ft 8 in (2.03 m)	—	Sr	Tolentine	Bronx, NY
G/F	22	Chucky Sproling	6 ft 6 in (1.98 m)	—	Sr	Manual	Denver, CO
G	23	Derek Brown	6 ft 3 in (1.91 m)	—	Fr	H. Frank Carey	Franklin Square, NY
G	30	Carl Beckett (redshirt)	6 ft 4 in (1.93 m)	—	Jr	Christ the King	Queens, NY
F	31	Lamont Middleton	6 ft 6 in (1.98 m)	—	RS Jr	Walton/Hartford	Bronx, NY
C	41	Robert Werdann (injured)	6 ft 11 in (2.11 m)	—	Sr	Archbishop Molloy	Sunnyside, NY
C	42	Shawnelle Scott	6 ft 11 in (2.11 m)	—	So	All Hallows	New York, NY
G	45	Ron DeQueiroz	6 ft 3 in (1.91 m)	—	So	Xaverian	Rio de Janeiro, Brazil

Head coach

- Lou Carnesecca (St. John's, '50)

Assistant coach(es)

- Brian Mahoney
- Al LoBalbo
- Ron Rutledge

Legend

- (C) Team captain
- (S) Suspended
- (I) Ineligible
- (W) Walk-on
- Injured
- Current redshirt

== Schedule and results ==
Date time, TV	Rank^{#}	Opponent^{#}	Result	Record	Site (attendance) city, state
Regular season
11/23/91*	No. 10	Niagara	W 73–64	1–0	Alumni Hall; Queens, NY
11/29/91*	No. 8	UNC Wilmington; Lapchick Tournament Opening Round	W 75–57	2–0	Alumni Hall; Queens, NY
11/30/91*	No. 8	Drexel; Lapchick Tournament Championship Final	W 81–61	3–0	Alumni Hall (5,431); Queens, NY
12/05/91*; 9:00 p.m.	No. 7	vs. No. 1 Duke; ACC-Big East Challenge	L 81–91	3–1	Greensboro Coliseum (15,781); Greensboro, NC
12/14/91*	No. 11	vs. Manhattan	W 86–50	4–1	Knickerbocker Arena; Albany, NY
12/21/91*	No. 10	No. 14 Indiana	L 77–82	4–2	Madison Square Garden; New York, NY
12/27/91*	No. 18	Fordham; ECAC Holiday Festival Semifinal	W 70–53	5–2	Madison Square Garden; New York, NY
12/28/91*	No. 18	Memphis State; ECAC Holiday Festival Championship	W 75–54	6–2	Madison Square Garden; New York, NY
01/02/92	No. 18	at Villanova	W 79–69	7–2 (1–0)	du Pont Pavilion; Villanova, PA
01/04/92	No. 18	Miami (F.L.)	W 83–69	8–2 (2–0)	Alumni Hall; Queens, NY
01/07/92; WTNH	No. 17	at No. 5 Connecticut	L 76–85	8–3 (2–1)	Gampel Pavilion (8,241); Storrs, CT
01/11/92	No. 17	Boston College	W 85–72	9–3 (3–1)	Alumni Hall; Queens, NY
01/14/92	No. 17	at Miami (F.L.)	L 42–45	9–4 (3–2)	Miami Arena; Miami, FL
01/18/92	No. 17	at Providence	W 85–75	10–4 (4–2)	Alumni Hall; Queens, NY
01/20/92	No. 22	at Seton Hall	L 60–75	10–5 (4–3)	Meadowlands Arena; East Rutherford, NJ
01/25/92	No. 22	at No. 13 Syracuse	L 56–58	10–6 (4–4)	Carrier Dome; Syracuse, NY
01/29/92		at Georgetown	L 48–61	10–7 (4–5)	Capital Centre (10,109); Landover, MD
02/01/92; CBS		No. 6 Connecticut	W 90–57	11–7 (5–5)	Madison Square Garden (19,876); New York, NY
02/05/92		at Boston College	W 70–60	12–7 (6–5)	Silvio O. Conte Forum; Chestnut Hill, MA
02/08/92		Villanova	W 69–53	13–7 (7–5)	Alumni Hall; Queens, NY
02/15/92		at Pittsburgh	W 84–74	14–7 (8–5)	Fitzgerald Field House; Pittsburgh, PA
02/19/92	No. 24	No. 17 Syracuse	W 63–62	15–7 (9–5)	Madison Square Garden; New York, NY
02/22/92	No. 24	Pittsburgh	W 71–65	16–7 (10–5)	Alumni Hall; Queens, NY
02/24/92	No. 20	at Providence	W 72–68 ^{OT}	17–7 (11–5)	Providence Civic Center; Providence, RI
02/29/92*	No. 20	at Notre Dame	L 70–79	17–8	Edmund P. Joyce Center; Notre Dame, IN
03/02/92		No. 17 Georgetown	W 65–49	18–8 (12–5)	Madison Square Garden (16,816); New York, NY
03/07/92		No. 22 Seton Hall	L 71–78	18–9 (12–6)	Madison Square Garden; New York, NY
Big East tournament
03/13/92; WTNH	(3) No. 25	vs. Connecticut; Big East tournament quarterfinal	W 64–59 ^{OT}	19–9	Madison Square Garden (18,899); New York, NY
03/14/92	(3) No. 25	vs. (2) No. 21 Georgetown; Big East tournament semifinal	L 64–68	19–10	Madison Square Garden (18,897); New York, NY
NCAA tournament
03/20/92	(7 SE)	vs. (10 SE) Tulane; NCAA First Round	L 57–61	19–11	Omni Coliseum; Atlanta, GA
*Non-conference game. ^{#}Rankings from AP Poll. (#) Tournament seedings in parentheses.

== Team players drafted into the NBA ==
Round	Pick	Player	NBA club
1	14	Malik Sealy	Indiana Pacers
2	46	Robert Werdann	Denver Nuggets
