= Dave Johnson (basketball) =

American basketball player (born 1970)

Personal information
- Born: November 16, 1970 (age 55) Morgan City, Louisiana, U.S.
- Listed height: 6 ft 7 in (2.01 m)
- Listed weight: 210 lb (95 kg)

Career information
- High school: Maine Central Institute (Pittsfield, Maine)
- College: Syracuse (1988–1992)
- NBA draft: 1992: 1st round, 26th overall pick
- Drafted by: Portland Trail Blazers
- Playing career: 1992–2001
- Position: Shooting guard / small forward
- Number: 4, 8

Career history
- 1992–1993: Portland Trail Blazers
- 1993–1994: Chicago Bulls
- 1994: NatWest Zaragoza
- 1994–1995: Grand Rapids Mackers
- 1995: Rapid City Thrillers
- 1995–1996: JDA Dijon
- 1996–1997: Florida Beachdogs
- 1997–1998: Pasta Baronia Napoli
- 1998: Cangrejeros de Santurce
- 1998–1999: Rockford Lightning
- 1999: Idaho Stampede
- 1999: Cangrejeros de Santurce
- 2000: Mets de Guaynabo
- 2000–2001: Cangrejeros de Santurce

Career highlights
- First-team All-Big East (1992); Second-team All-Big East (1991)
- Stats at NBA.com
- Stats at Basketball Reference

Dave M. Johnson (born November 16, 1970) is an American former professional basketball player who had a brief career in the National Basketball Association (NBA) in the early 1990s.

Born in Morgan City, Louisiana, Johnson played his prep ball at Maine Central Institute prep school and earned All American honors in the highly-touted high school boy's class of 1988 with such notable players as Billy Owens, Alonzo Mourning and Shawn Kemp to name a few & participated in the 1988 Dapper Dan Classic. He attended Syracuse University, where, as a junior and senior, he developed into a high scoring small forward. Following his senior year, he participated in the now defunct Orlando Classic NBA pre-draft camp/tournament and made the all-tourney team, had the highest measured vertical leap of all the camp participants (34 inches), was the leading scorer in the tournament (19 points per game) and also won the Slam Dunk Contest. He was selected by the Portland Trail Blazers as the 26th pick in the 1992 NBA draft. He played one season for Portland before moving on to the Chicago Bulls in his second and final NBA season, for whom he played 17 games in 1993–94.
