= Alonzo Mourning =

American basketball player (born 1970)

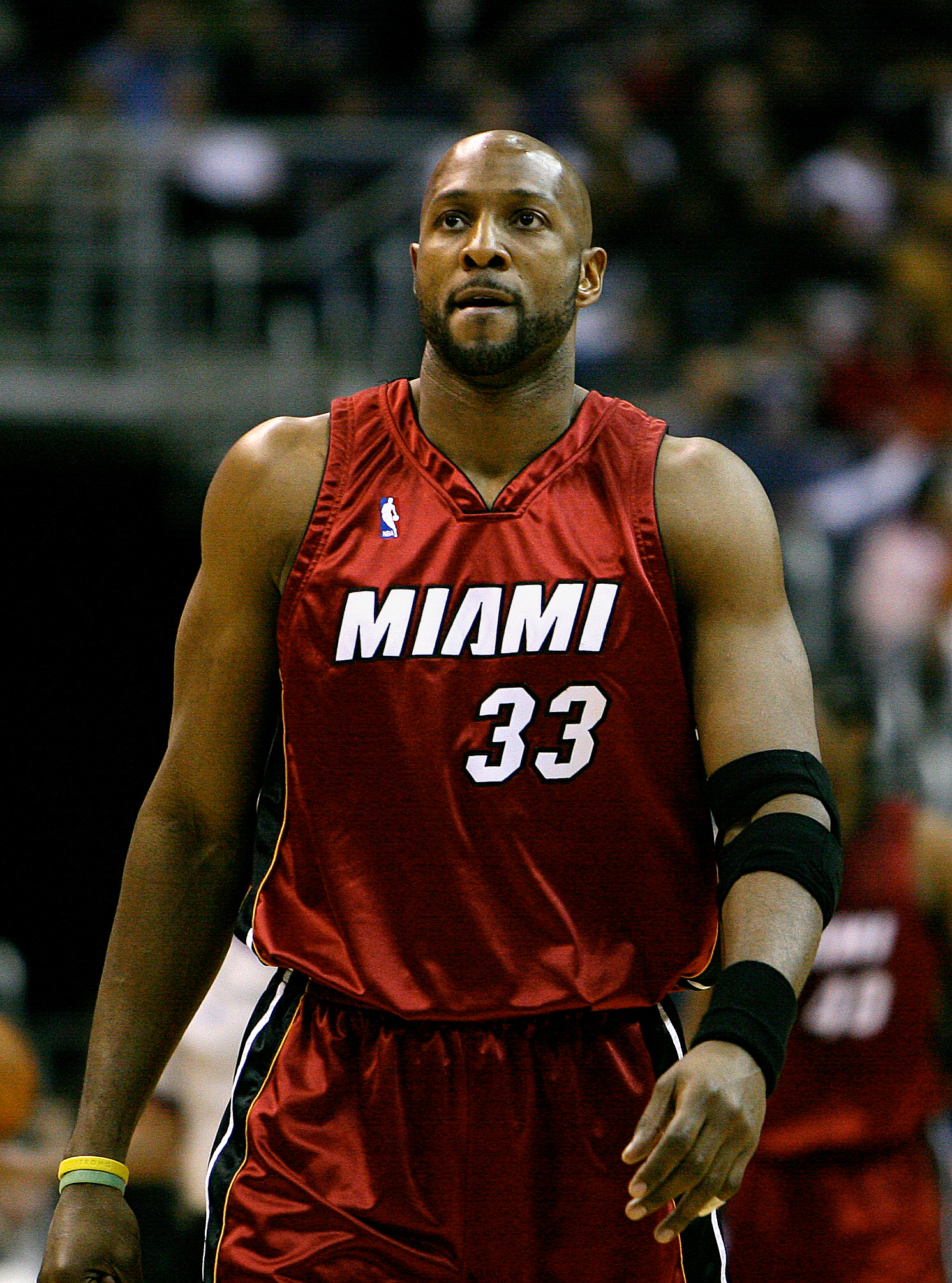
- Mourning with the Miami Heat in 2007

Miami Heat
- Title: Vice president of player programs and development
- League: NBA

Personal information
- Born: February 8, 1970 (age 56) Chesapeake, Virginia, U.S.
- Listed height: 6 ft 10 in (2.08 m)
- Listed weight: 261 lb (118 kg)

Career information
- High school: Indian River (Chesapeake, Virginia)
- College: Georgetown (1988–1992)
- NBA draft: 1992: 1st round, 2nd overall pick
- Drafted by: Charlotte Hornets
- Playing career: 1992–2008
- Position: Center
- Number: 33

Career history
- 1992–1995: Charlotte Hornets
- 1995–2003: Miami Heat
- 2003–2004: New Jersey Nets
- 2005–2008: Miami Heat

Career highlights
- NBA champion (2006); 7× NBA All-Star (1994–1997, 2000–2002); All-NBA First Team (1999); All-NBA Second Team (2000); 2× NBA Defensive Player of the Year (1999, 2000); 2× NBA All-Defensive First Team (1999, 2000); 2× NBA blocks leader (1999, 2000); NBA All-Rookie First Team (1993); No. 33 retired by Miami Heat; Consensus first-team All-American (1992); Consensus second-team All-American (1990); Third-team All-American – NABC (1991); Big East Player of the Year (1992); 2× First-team All-Big East (1990, 1992); 3× Big East Defensive Player of the Year (1989, 1990, 1992); NCAA blocks leader (1989); 2× USA Basketball Male Athlete of the Year (1990, 2000); National high school player of the year (1988); McDonald's All-American Game Co-MVP (1988); 2× First-team Parade All-American (1987, 1988); Second-team Parade All-American (1986); 2× Virginia Mr. Basketball (1987, 1988)

Career statistics
- Points: 14,311 (17.1 ppg)
- Rebounds: 7,137 (8.5 rpg)
- Blocks: 2,356 (2.8 bpg)
- Stats at NBA.com
- Stats at Basketball Reference
- Basketball Hall of Fame
- FIBA Hall of Fame
Medals
Men's basketball
Representing United States
Summer Olympics
Gold medal – first place	2000 Sydney
FIBA World Cup
Gold medal – first place	1994 Canada
Bronze medal – third place	1990 Argentina
Goodwill Games
Silver medal – second place	1990 Seattle

Alonzo Harding Mourning Jr. (born February 8, 1970) is an American former professional basketball player who has served since 2009 as vice president of player programs and development for the Miami Heat. Mourning played most of his 15-year National Basketball Association (NBA) career for the Heat.

Nicknamed "Zo", Mourning played the center position. Following his college basketball career at Georgetown University, his tenacity on defense twice earned him the NBA Defensive Player of the Year Award and twice placed him on the NBA All-Defensive Team. Mourning made a comeback after undergoing a kidney transplant and later won the 2006 NBA championship with the Heat. He also played for the Charlotte Hornets and New Jersey Nets. On March 30, 2009, Mourning became the first Miami Heat player to have his number retired. In 2010, Mourning was inducted into the Virginia Sports Hall of Fame. In 2014, Mourning was inducted into the Naismith Memorial Basketball Hall of Fame, and in 2019 he was inducted into the FIBA Hall of Fame.

== Early life ==
Mourning was born on February 8, 1970, in Chesapeake, Virginia. He attended Indian River High School, where he excelled in basketball. He led the team to 51 straight victories and a state title his junior year (1987), beating Robinson Secondary School in the state finals. As a senior, he averaged 25 points, 15 rebounds and 12 blocked shots per game.

Mourning was named Player of the Year by USA Today, Parade, Gatorade, and Naismith, and was the #1 recruit of the 1988 class, over Christian Laettner, Shawn Kemp, Billy Owens, Kenny Williams, Stanley Roberts, Rick Fox, and Malik Sealy.

== College career ==
Mourning played college basketball for John Thompson at Georgetown University. He made an immediate impact as a freshman, starting all 34 games for the Hoyas, averaging 13.1 points and 7.3 rebounds per game. But his most notable accomplishment was leading the nation in total blocked shots (169) and blocks per game (5.0); both figures led the nation and set NCAA records for a freshman at that time.

Mourning's scoring and rebounding improved over the next two seasons, but his shot-blocking declined significantly, as his taller teammate Dikembe Mutombo established himself as starting center for Georgetown, forcing Mourning to play at power forward. After Mutombo entered the NBA draft in 1991, Mourning re-took his place as starting center, and responded with a spectacular senior season in 1991–92. He averaged 21.3 points, 10.7 rebounds, and 5.0 blocks per game that year, and collected numerous awards, including Consensus First-Team All-American and Big East Conference Player of the Year. He was also named Big East Defensive Player of the Year, which he had won twice previously (as a freshman in 1988–89, and again as a sophomore in 1989–90, sharing the award with Mutombo that season; Mutombo won the award alone in 1990–91).

Mourning finished his college career with 2,001 points and 1,032 rebounds, reaching the exclusive 2,000-point and 1,000-rebound milestone. More impressively, he finished with 453 blocked shots in his college career, ranking first all-time in NCAA history at that time. Mourning was never listed as the all-time leader in Georgetown history, as the school credits Patrick Ewing with 493 blocks during his college career, but blocked shots were not an official NCAA statistic at that time.

== Professional career ==
=== Charlotte Hornets (1992–1995) ===
Mourning was selected second overall in the 1992 NBA draft by the Charlotte Hornets, behind Shaquille O'Neal and before Christian Laettner. Mourning was named to the league's all-rookie team in 1993 after averaging 21.0 points, 10.3 rebounds, and 3.47 blocks. He finished second to Shaquille O'Neal in rookie of the year voting. He posted the highest scoring average of any rookie in Hornets history. Mourning and O'Neal were the first NBA rookies since David Robinson in the 1989–90 season to average 20 or more points and 10-plus rebounds in their first seasons. Mourning shattered Charlotte's blocked-shots records, becoming the Hornets' all-time career leader in the 49th game of the season. The greatest moment of Mourning's rookie season came on May 5, 1993, in Game 4 of a first-round playoff series against the Boston Celtics. His 20-footer with .4 seconds left gave the Hornets a 104–103 victory in the game and a 3–1 victory in the series. The Hornets lost in the second round to the New York Knicks in five games, with Mourning averaging 23.8 points, 9.9 rebounds and 3.4 blocks in nine playoff games. The following year, Mourning played in just 60 games, posting almost similar averages of 21.5 points, 10.2 rebounds and 3.1 blocks per game, but the Hornets missed the playoffs.

In the 1994–95 season, Mourning and teammate Larry Johnson led the Hornets to a 50-win season and reached the playoffs. Mourning ranked first on the team in scoring (21.3 per game), rebounding (9.9 per game), blocked shots (2.92 per game), and field goal percentage (.519), and played in the 1995 NBA All-Star Game where he scored 10 points and grabbed 8 rebounds. The Hornets lost in four games to the Chicago Bulls in the first round of the playoffs, despite Mourning averaging 22 points, 13.3 rebounds, and 3.3 blocks during the series.

=== Miami Heat (1995–2003) ===
On November 3, 1995, after Mourning rejected Charlotte's contract extension offer worth an average of $11.2 million for seven years and knowing they would not be able to re-sign him, the Hornets traded him, along with reserves Pete Myers and LeRon Ellis to the Miami Heat in exchange for Glen Rice, Matt Geiger, Khalid Reeves and a first-round pick in the 1996 NBA draft.

Mourning would immediately serve as the centerpiece of the Pat Riley-coached Heat, and in his first season in Miami he averaged 23.2 points, 10.4 rebounds and 2.7 blocks per game as Miami made the playoffs before being swept in the first round by the 72-win Bulls. Mourning played in the 1996 NBA All-Star Game and was joined by All-Star point guard Tim Hardaway who arrived through a mid-season trade.

In July 1996, Mourning signed a seven-year, $105 million contract with the Heat. In the 1996–97 season, the Heat would go on to win a then franchise-record 61 games, finishing second in the Eastern Conference behind the defending champions Bulls, while Mourning averaged 19.8 points, 9.9 rebounds and 2.9 blocks per game. In the playoffs, Miami defeated the Orlando Magic in five games, and advanced to the conference semifinals against the Knicks, where the rivalry between the Heat and the New York Knicks intensified. The Knicks took a 3–1 series lead, but following a brawl between Charlie Ward and P. J. Brown late in Game 5, multiple suspensions were handed down. Mourning scored 28 points in Game 6, followed by a 22-point, 12-rebound performance in Game 7 to help Miami advance to the Eastern Conference Finals, a franchise first, to face Chicago. The Bulls took a 3–0 series lead, and Mourning guaranteed a victory in Game 4 as the Heat won 87–80. However, with a 100–87 loss in Game 5, the Heat were eliminated by the Bulls.

In the 1997–98 season, Mourning played 58 games and averaged 19.2 points, 9.6 rebounds and 2.2 blocks per game as the Heat won 55 games. However, Miami lost in the first round to the Knicks, with Mourning missing the deciding Game 5 due to a suspension caused by a fight between Mourning and former teammate Larry Johnson in Game 4. The brawl also involved Knicks head coach Jeff Van Gundy, who was seen dangling on Mourning's leg in an attempt to break up the fight. The following season, the Heat won 31 games in a lockout-shortened 50-game schedule, and Mourning won his first of two consecutive Defensive Player of the Year awards after leading the league in blocks with 3.9 per game. Despite finishing with the best record in the Eastern Conference, the Heat once again fell short to the Knicks in the first round, with Allan Houston securing the series victory with a last-second jumper in Game 5. Mourning again led the NBA in blocks in the 1999–2000 season, this time with a 3.7 average, and won Defensive Player of the Year. Miami finished the regular season with 52 wins and faced the Knicks in the second round. But for a third straight season, the Heat lost to the Knicks in a winner-take-all game, this time in Game 7.

Shortly after playing for the gold medal-winning U.S. national team in the 2000 Summer Olympics, Mourning was diagnosed with a serious kidney disease. Initially deemed out for the remainder of the season, Mourning returned for the final 13 games, helping the Heat win 50 games despite playing limited minutes. However, Miami was swept 3–0 in the first round by the Hornets. In the 2001–02 season, Mourning played 75 games and averaged 15.7 points, 8.4 rebounds and 2.5 blocks per game, earning his final All-Star nod. Despite that, the Heat missed the playoffs with a 36–46 record. Mourning missed the entire 2002–03 season as he continued to deal with a serious kidney disorder, and without their star center, the Heat won only 25 games and missed the playoffs again.

=== New Jersey Nets (2003–2004) ===
Mourning signed a four-year deal with the New Jersey Nets in July 2003 as a free agent. On November 24, 2003, after appearing in 12 games, Mourning retired from the NBA due to complications from his kidney disease. On December 19, he underwent a successful kidney transplant. In 2004, he started practicing with the Nets again, and made the team's regular season roster during the 2004–05 season. He did not play a significant role with the Nets, however, and openly complained to the media that he wanted out of New Jersey, especially after the team traded away Kenyon Martin. After playing in just 30 total games for New Jersey, Mourning, Eric Williams and Aaron Williams (and two first-round draft picks) were traded to the Toronto Raptors for Vince Carter on December 17, 2004. Mourning never reported to the Raptors, and was bought out of his contract at a remaining $9 million on February 11, 2005. Raptors team officials later said that he did not meet the medical conditions to play for the team. Mourning then finished the season with the Heat being paid a second salary, the veteran's minimum.

=== Return to the Heat (2005–2008) ===
Mourning re-signed with the Heat on March 1, 2005. His role was reduced as a backup because of superstar Shaquille O'Neal, although he was called upon as a starter due to O'Neal missing stretches due to injury. O'Neal and Mourning even played together on the court at times, with Mourning playing power forward. Because of physical limitations, his minutes were reduced, but was still a steady contributor. Mourning's tenacious defense, steady offense, and all around hustle helped the Heat gain and maintain the first seed in Eastern Conference during the 2004–05 season. Mourning finished the regular season ranking third in blocked shots at 2.66 per game, despite only playing 20 minutes per contest. Miami swept the Nets in the first round of the playoffs, with Mourning recording 21 points and nine rebounds in just 16 minutes in Game 2. In the second round against the Washington Wizards, Mourning stepped in for the injured O'Neal and scored 14 points with 13 rebounds and blocked four shots in Game 3 as Miami completed another four-game sweep. Miami fell in seven games to the defending champions, the Detroit Pistons, in the Eastern Conference Finals, with Mourning leading the team in blocks with three per game for the series.

On June 17, 2005, the Heat picked up the team option on Mourning, as the Heat once again overhauled their roster, acquiring other veterans seeking a title such as Antoine Walker and Gary Payton. Mourning continued to serve as the Heat's backup center, and early on stepped in to serve as the team's starting center after O'Neal suffered an injury. Mourning started in 20 games out of a total of 65 games played, averaging 7.8 points and 5.5 rebounds, while finishing third in the league with 2.7 blocks per game despite playing as a reserve. In the playoffs, Mourning continued to shine in his role as a defensive player off the bench, as Miami advanced past the Bulls and the Nets before defeating the Pistons in six games to advance to the 2006 NBA Finals, the first NBA Finals in franchise history and the first for Mourning. After a 2–0 deficit, Miami won all three of its home games led by the spectacular play of Dwyane Wade, and in Game 6 in Dallas, Mourning came off the bench to score eight points with six rebounds and a team-high five blocks to help Miami win its first NBA championship in franchise history.

After winning the championship, Mourning announced that he would return to the Heat in the 2006–07 season to defend their title, despite receiving offers of more money from other teams, including the San Antonio Spurs. In 2007, Mourning announced he would return for one more year with the Heat and his 15th season. "It will definitely be my last year", Mourning said. After starting the season on a solid note averaging 6 points, 3.8 rebounds and 1.75 blocks in just over 16 minutes played per 24 games, Mourning tore his patellar tendon in his right knee on December 19, 2007, during the first quarter of the 117–111 overtime loss to the Atlanta Hawks.

During the 2007–08 season, he became the Heat's all-time leader in points scored (which has since been surpassed by Dwyane Wade).

== Retirement ==
Mourning announced his retirement from the NBA on January 22, 2009. In his press conference he said, "At 38 I feel like I've physically done all I can for this game." One month later, the Heat announced that they would retire Mourning's number 33 jersey, making him the first Heat player to be so honored. The jersey retirement ceremony occurred on March 30, 2009, when the Heat hosted the Orlando Magic. During the extended halftime ceremony, Mourning was introduced by Florida Governor Charlie Crist; former Georgetown University basketball coach John Thompson; Basketball Hall of Famer Patrick Ewing; Heat players Dwyane Wade and Udonis Haslem; and Heat head coach Pat Riley.

In May 2009, he was named to the Hampton Roads Sports Hall of Fame, which honors athletes, coaches, and administrators who contributed to sports in southeastern Virginia. In the following April, he was inducted into the Virginia Sports Hall of Fame in recognition of his outstanding high school, collegiate, and professional career as well as his commitment to volunteer service in the communities in which he has lived and worked throughout his life.

Mourning announced his return to the Heat in late June 2009; he holds the position of vice president of player programs and development, which covers community outreach and mentoring young players.

Mourning played in a basketball game for Barack Obama's 50th birthday at the basketball court at the White House in 2011. In addition to Mourning, the game featured Shane Battier, LeBron James, Magic Johnson, Maya Moore, Joakim Noah, Chris Paul and Derrick Rose and Obama's friends from high school. Kobe Bryant and Bill Russell were spectators.

On April 7, 2014, it was announced that Mourning would be inducted into the Naismith Memorial Basketball Hall of Fame on August 8.

On March 26, 2019, Mourning was named to the FIBA Hall of Fame, and was inducted on August 30.

In 2021, to commemorate the NBA's 75th anniversary The Athletic ranked their top 75 players of all time, and named Mourning as the 69th greatest player in NBA history.

Mourning told ESPN on June 4, 2024, that he is cancer-free after his March prostatectomy following a February medical diagnosis of high-grade stage 3 cancer.

== Awards and achievements ==
- 3-time NBA champion: 2006 (as a player), 2012, 2013 (as vice president of player programs)
- 7-time NBA All-Star: 1994–1997, 2000–2002
- All-NBA First Team: 1999
- All-NBA Second Team: 2000
- 2-time NBA Defensive Player of the Year: 1999, 2000
- 2-time NBA All-Defensive First Team: 1999, 2000
- NBA All-Rookie First Team: 1993
- J. Walter Kennedy Citizenship Award: (2002)
- 2-time NBA blocks leader: 1999, 2000
- Heat franchise second leading scorer with 9,459 points
- Won gold at the 1994 FIBA World Championship and the 2000 Summer Olympics with the United States national team
- Won bronze at the 1990 FIBA World Championship with the United States national team
- McDonald's All-American Game MVP : 1988
- Mr. Basketball USA: 1988
- Naismith Prep Player of the Year: 1988
- USA Today High School Player of the Year: 1988
- 2× First-team Parade All-American: 1987, 1988
- Second-team Parade All-American: 1986
- Virginia Mr. Basketball: 1988

== Charitable work ==
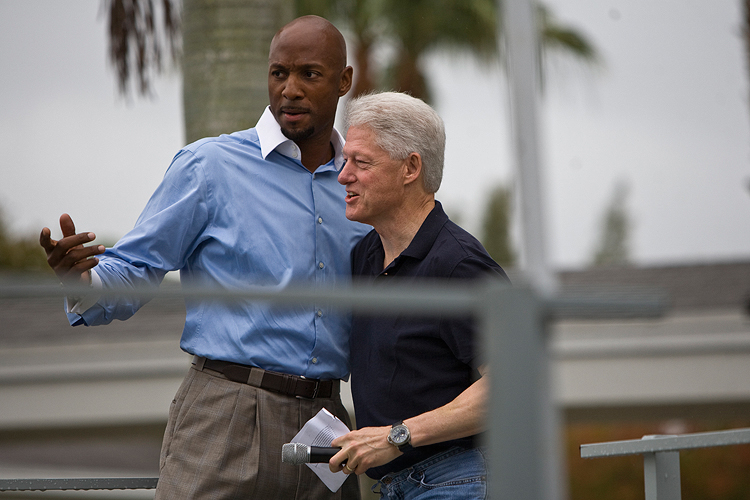
Alonzo Mourning with former U.S. President Bill Clinton during Clinton Global Initiative University Day of Service at Carrfour Supportive Housing community for formerly homeless families in Miami, Florida, April 2010

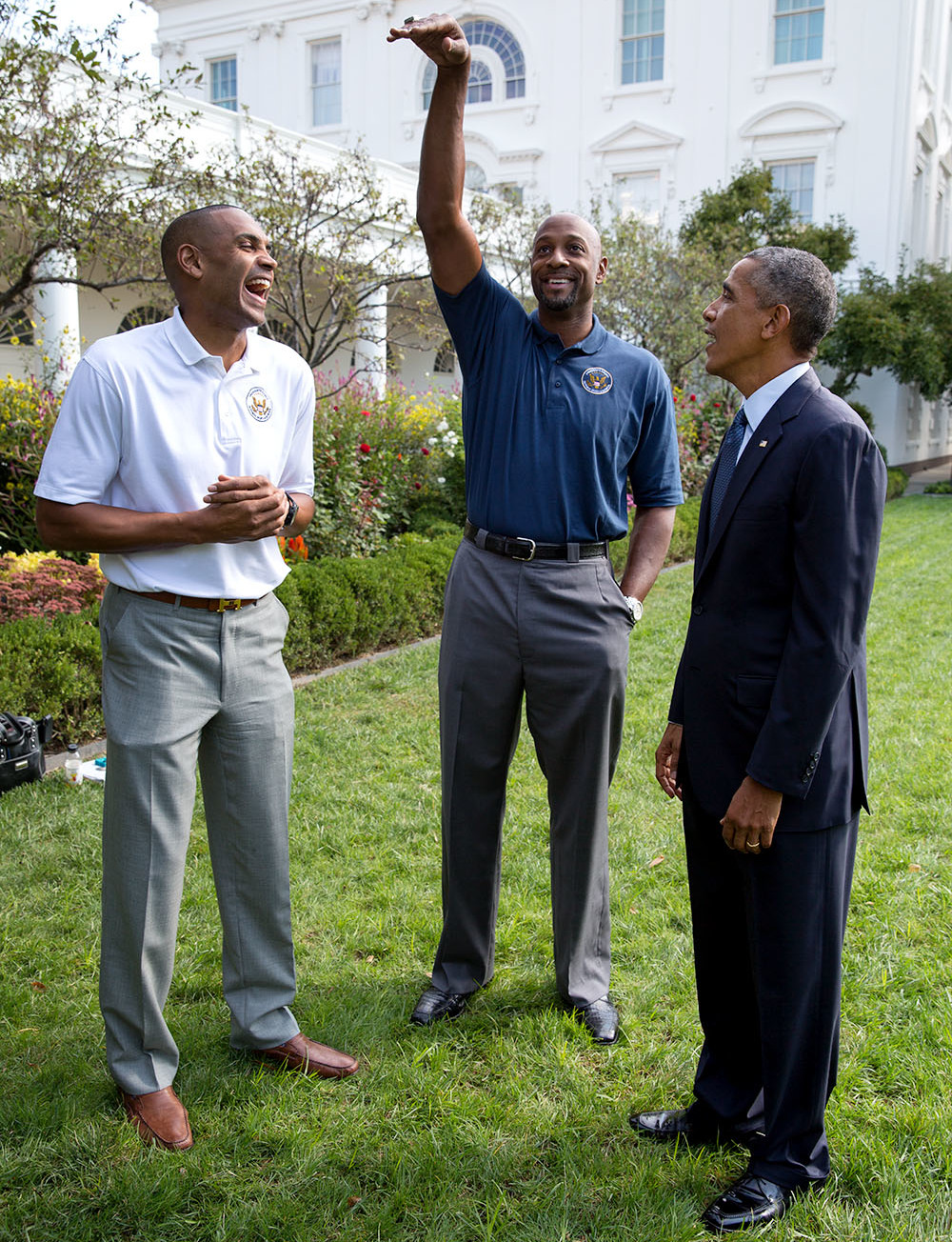
Mourning (center) with Grant Hill and President Barack Obama in the White House Rose Garden in 2014

In 1997, Mourning established Alonzo Mourning Charities Inc. to aid in the development of children and families living in at-risk situations and provides support and services that enhance the lives of youth of promise.

After being diagnosed with focal glomerulosclerosis (FSGS), Mourning launched Zo's Fund for Life, a campaign which seeks to raise funds for research, education, and testing to fight focal glomerulosclerosis. Funds are allocated toward research for a cure, education for doctors and the general public, testing for early detection and a fund for those not able to afford medication.

In 2007, Mourning along with Andre Agassi, Muhammad Ali, Lance Armstrong, Warrick Dunn, Mia Hamm, Jeff Gordon, Tony Hawk, Andrea Jaeger, Jackie Joyner-Kersee, Mario Lemieux, and Cal Ripken Jr. founded Athletes for Hope, a charitable organization, which helps professional athletes get involved in charitable causes and inspires millions of non-athletes to volunteer and support the community.

In 2003, he also founded the Overtown Youth Center for underprivileged kids, located in Miami, Florida. The program aims to inspire, empower, and enrich these children while teaching them to become positive contributing citizens.

In 2009, the Miami-Dade school board named a new high school in North Miami, Florida, in his honor, Alonzo and Tracy Mourning Senior High Biscayne Bay Campus.

== Personal life ==
Mourning and his ex-wife Tracy have three children. Like his father, his oldest son, Trey Mourning played for the Georgetown Hoyas basketball team, wearing his father's signature number 33 jersey. They resided in Pinecrest, Florida, where Mourning purchased a two-story, 9,786-square-foot residence for $4.5 million in 2012. On June 26, 2019, Trey was included on the Miami Heat roster for the 2019 NBA Summer League, and was later selected second overall by the Sioux Falls Skyforce of the NBA G League in the 2019 NBA G League draft.

In July 2011, Mourning was sued by Miami-based lawyer Spencer Aronfeld on behalf of Alberto Candoleria for crashing his car into another car and then leaving the scene of the accident. The Florida Highway Patrol later charged Mourning with leaving the scene of a car accident. The accident allegedly occurred after he left Chris Bosh's wedding in Miami Beach after 3:00 a.m. Candoleria had just been in an accident when Mourning struck his car.

In 2015, Mourning was one of eight Virginians honored in the Library of Virginia's "Strong Men & Women in Virginia History" for his charitable work and for his contributions to the sport of basketball.

=== Kidney transplant ===
On November 25, 2003, Mourning's cousin and a retired U.S. Marine, Jason Cooper, was visiting Mourning's gravely ill grandmother in the hospital. Mourning's father was present and informed Cooper that Mourning was retiring that day from the NBA because of a life-threatening kidney disease, focal segmental glomerulosclerosis, the same problem that Sean Elliott had in 1999. Cooper asked if there was anything he could do, and began to contemplate donating one of his kidneys to his estranged cousin, whom he had not seen in 25 years and whom he only knew through basketball. Cooper was tested for compatibility, along with many other family members and friends (including fellow NBA center and good friend Patrick Ewing); during his grandmother's funeral, Mourning received the news that Jason Cooper was a match.

Mourning received Cooper's left kidney on December 19, 2003.

As of 2022, Mourning has partnered with Vertex Pharmaceuticals to launch “Power Forward” an educational initiative aimed at raising awareness of APOL1-mediated kidney disease (AMKD), highlighting the importance of early diagnosis and genetic testing. "Mourning's partnership with Vertex". Vertex Pharmaceuticals. November 4, 2022.

== Career statistics ==
Legend
GP	Games played	GS	Games started	MPG	Minutes per game
FG%	Field goal percentage	3P%	3-point field goal percentage	FT%	Free throw percentage
RPG	Rebounds per game	APG	Assists per game	SPG	Steals per game
BPG	Blocks per game	PPG	Points per game	**Bold**	Career high
†	Won an NBA championship	*	Led the league

=== NBA ===
==== Regular season ====
Year	Team	GP	GS	MPG	FG%	3P%	FT%	RPG	APG	SPG	BPG	PPG
1992–93	Charlotte	78	**78**	33.9	.511	.000	.781	10.3	1.0	.3	3.5	21.0
1993–94	Charlotte	60	59	33.6	.505	.000	.762	10.2	1.4	.5	3.1	21.5
1994–95	Charlotte	77	77	**38.2**	.519	.324	.761	9.9	1.4	.6	2.9	21.3
1995–96	Miami	70	70	**38.2**	.523	.300	.685	10.4	**2.3**	**1.0**	2.7	**23.2**
1996–97	Miami	66	65	35.2	.534	.111	.642	9.9	1.6	.8	2.9	19.8
1997–98	Miami	58	56	33.4	.551	.000	.665	9.6	.9	.7	2.2	19.2
1998–99	Miami	46	46	38.1	.511	.000	.652	**11.0**	1.6	.7	**3.9***	20.1
1999–00	Miami	**79**	**78**	34.8	.551	.000	.711	9.5	1.6	.5	3.7*	21.7
2000–01	Miami	13	3	23.5	.518	.000	.564	7.8	.9	.3	2.4	13.6
2001–02	Miami	75	74	32.7	.516	**.333**	.657	8.4	1.2	.4	2.5	15.7
2003–04	New Jersey	12	0	17.9	.465	.000	**.882**	2.3	.7	.2	.5	8.0
2004–05	New Jersey	18	14	25.4	.453	.000	.593	7.1	.8	.3	2.3	10.4
2004–05	Miami	19	3	12.9	.516	.000	.564	3.7	.2	.2	1.7	5.0
2005–06†	Miami	65	20	20.0	**.597**	.000	.594	5.5	.2	.2	2.7	7.8
2006–07	Miami	77	43	20.4	.560	.000	.601	4.5	.2	.2	2.3	8.6
2007–08	Miami	25	0	15.6	.547	.000	.592	3.7	.3	.2	1.7	6.0
Career		838	686	31.0	.527	.247	.692	8.5	1.1	.5	2.8	17.1
All-Star		4	1	18.8	.545	.000	.667	4.8	1.0	.8	2.0	10.0

==== Playoffs ====
Year	Team	GP	GS	MPG	FG%	3P%	FT%	RPG	APG	SPG	BPG	PPG
1993	Charlotte	9	9	40.8	.480	.000	.774	9.9	1.4	.7	**3.4**	**23.8**
1995	Charlotte	4	4	**43.5**	.421	**.500**	**.837**	**13.3**	**2.8**	.8	3.3*	22.0
1996	Miami	3	3	30.7	.486	.000	.714	6.0	1.3	.7	1.0	18.0
1997	Miami	17	**17**	37.1	.491	.375	.555	10.2	1.1	.6	2.7*	17.8
1998	Miami	4	4	34.5	.518	.000	.655	8.5	1.3	.8	2.5	19.3
1999	Miami	5	5	38.8	.521	.000	.653	8.2	.8	**1.6**	2.8	21.6
2000	Miami	10	10	37.6	.484	.000	.667	10.0	1.4	.2	3.3*	21.6
2001	Miami	3	3	30.3	.480	.000	.579	5.3	1.0	.0	1.7	11.7
2005	Miami	15	2	16.9	.705	.000	.558	4.8	.3	.3	2.2	6.1
2006†	Miami	**21**	0	10.8	.703	.000	.667	2.9	.1	.2	1.1	3.8
2007	Miami	4	0	13.8	**.909**	.000	.385	2.0	.3	.0	.8	6.3
Career		95	57	27.3	.512	.368	.649	7.0	.9	.5	2.3	13.6

=== College ===
Year	Team	GP	GS	MPG	FG%	3P%	FT%	RPG	APG	SPG	BPG	PPG
1988–89	Georgetown	**34**	**34**	28.3	**.603**	.250	.667	7.3	.7	.4	**5.0***	13.1
1989–90	Georgetown	31	31	30.2	.525	.000	.783	8.5	1.2	.5	2.2	16.5
1990–91	Georgetown	23	23	29.7	.522	**.308**	**.793**	7.7	1.1	.4	2.4	15.8
1991–92	Georgetown	32	31	**32.8**	.595	.000	.758	**10.7**	**1.7**	**.6**	**5.0**	**21.3**
Career		120	119	30.3	.566	.261	.754	8.6	1.2	.5	3.8	16.7

== See also ==
- List of NBA career blocks leaders
- List of NBA career playoff blocks leaders
- List of NBA annual blocks leaders
- List of NBA single-season blocks per game leaders
- List of NCAA Division I men's basketball career blocks leaders
- List of NCAA Division I men's basketball season blocks leaders
- List of NCAA Division I men's basketball career free throw scoring leaders
- List of NCAA Division I men's basketball players with 2000 points and 1000 rebounds
