= List of Old Dominion Monarchs men's basketball head coaches =

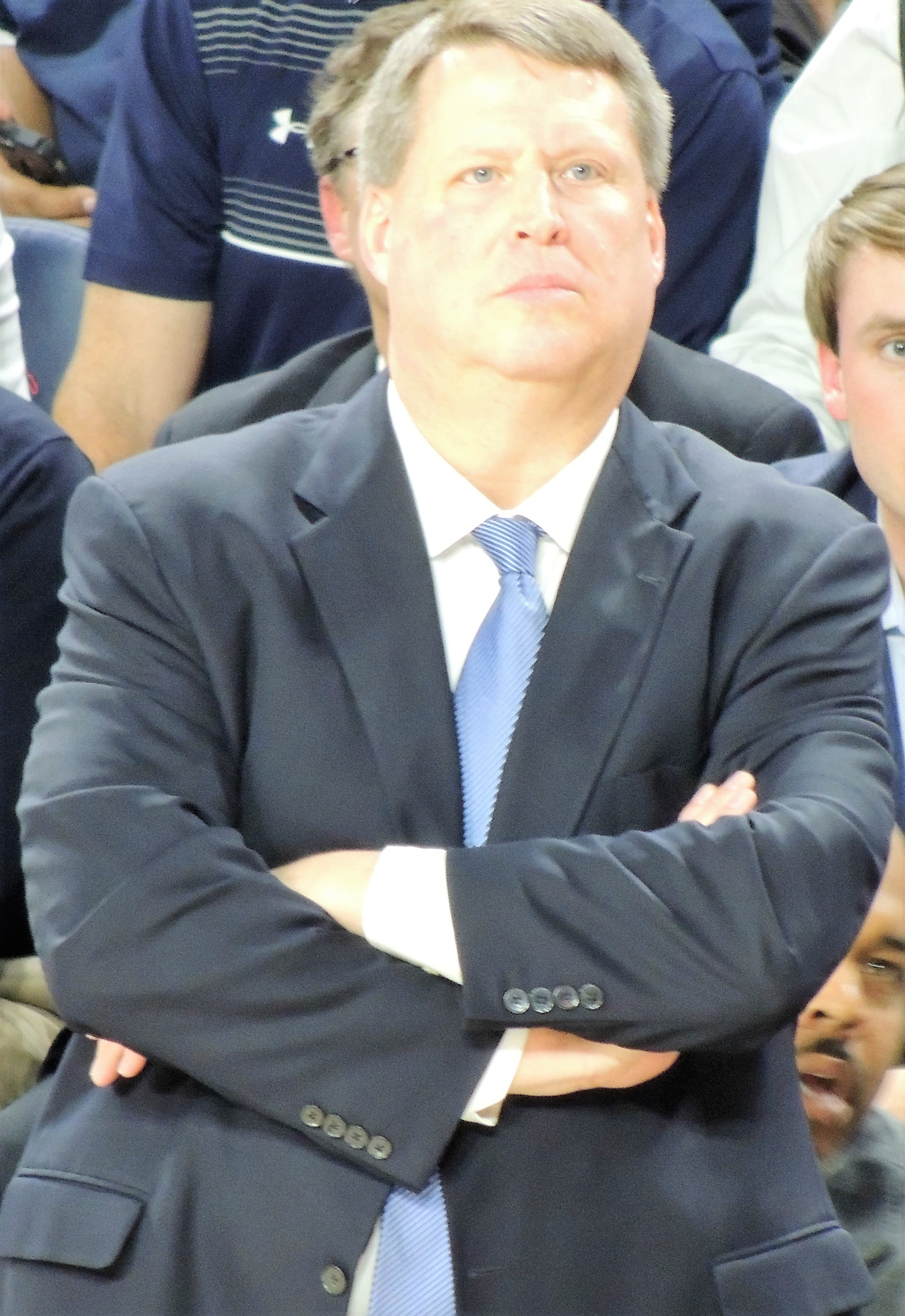
Jeff Jones, the former head coach of the Old Dominion Monarchs.

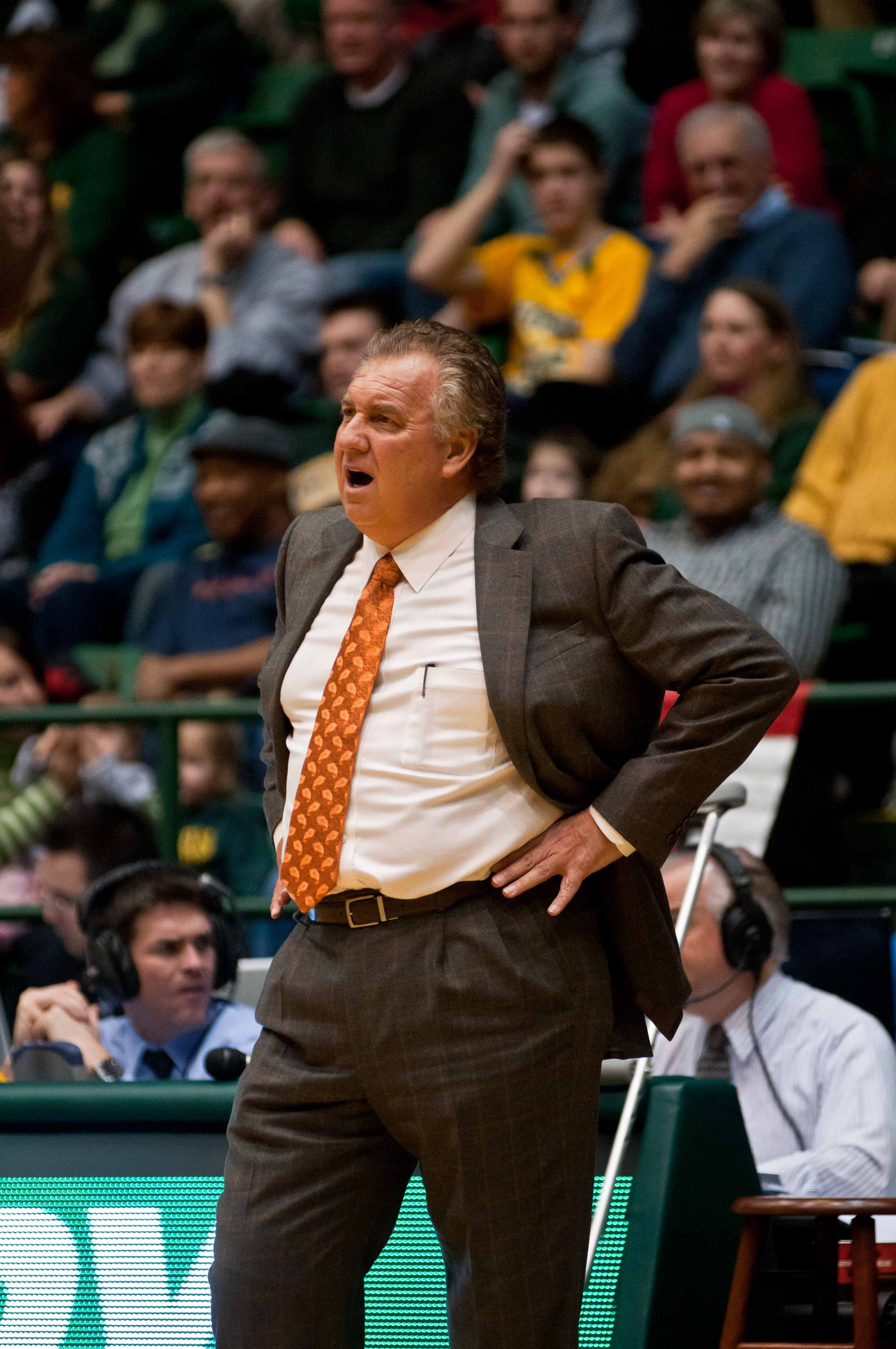
Blaine Taylor, the winningest head coach in Monarchs men's basketball history.

The following is a list of Old Dominion Monarchs men's basketball head coaches. There have been 16 head coaches of the Monarchs in their 94-season history.

Old Dominion's current head coach is Mike Jones. He was hired as the Monarchs' head coach in March 2024, replacing Jeff Jones, who retired at the end of the 2023–24 season after stepping away from the team while recovering from a midseason heart attack.

No.	Tenure	Coach	Years	Record	Pct.
1	1930–1940	Tommy Scott	10	92–83	.526
2	1940–1942	George Stirnweiss	2	4–29	.121
3	1942–1946	Scrap Chandler	4	28–31	.475
4	1946–1947	Julius Rubin	1	14–8	.636
5	1947–1948	Jack Callahan	1	21–8	.724
6	1948–1965	Bud Metheny	17	198–163	.548
7	1965–1975	Sonny Allen	10	181–94	.658
8	1975–1985	Paul Webb	10	196–99	.664
9	1985–1991	Tom Young	6	90–87	.508
10	1991–1994	Oliver Purnell	3	57–33	.633
11	1994–2001	Jeff Capel II	7	122–98	.555
12	2001–2013 (Note: Taylor was fired in February 2013. Jim Corrigan served as interim head coach for the remainder of the 2012–13 season.)	Blaine Taylor	12	239–144	.624
13	2013*	Jim Corrigan	1	3–5	.375
14	2013–2023 (Note: Jones suffered a heart attack in December 2023 at the Diamond Head Classic. Kieran Donohue served as interim head coach for the remainder of the 2023–24 season.)	Jeff Jones	10	203–131	.608
15	2023*	Kieran Donohue	1	4–17	.190
16	2024	Mike Jones		–	–
Totals		16 coaches	93 seasons	1,445–1,007	.589
Records updated through end of 2023–24 season * - Denotes interim head coach. Source
