= 1991–92 Old Dominion Monarchs basketball team =

American college basketball season

1991–92 Old Dominion Monarchs basketball

CAA tournament champions

NCAA tournament, First Round
- Conference: Colonial Athletic Association
- Record: 15–15 (8–6 CAA)
- Head coach: Oliver Purnell (1st season)
- Home arena: ODU Fieldhouse; Hampton Coliseum (alternate)

1991–92 CAA men's basketball standings
	Conf.				Overall
Team	W		L	PCT	W		L	PCT
Richmond	12	–	2	.857	22	–	8	.733
James Madison	12	–	2	.857	21	–	11	.656
American	8	–	6	.571	11	–	18	.379
Old Dominion †	8	–	6	.571	15	–	15	.500
UNC Wilmington	6	–	8	.429	13	–	15	.464
East Carolina	4	–	10	.286	10	–	18	.357
William & Mary	3	–	11	.214	10	–	19	.345
George Mason	3	–	11	.214	7	–	21	.250
† 1992 CAA tournament winner Rankings from AP Poll

The 1991–92 Old Dominion Monarchs basketball team represented Old Dominion University in the 1991–92 college basketball season. This was head coach Oliver Purnell's first of three seasons at Old Dominion. The Monarchs compete in the Colonial Athletic Association and played their home games at the ODU Fieldhouse. They finished the season 15–15, 8–6 in CAA play to finish in fourth place during the regular season. They went on to win the 1992 CAA men's basketball tournament to earn the CAA's automatic bid to the NCAA tournament. They earned a 15 seed in the East Region where they were beaten by 2 seed Kentucky in the opening round.

== Roster ==
1991–92 Old Dominion Monarchs men's basketball team
Players
Coaches

Pos.	#	Name	Height	Weight	Year	Hometown
G	14	Mike Jones	6 ft 5 in (1.96 m)	—	Fr
F	40	Ricardo Leonard	6 ft 7 in (2.01 m)	—	Sr

Head coach

- Oliver Purnell

Assistant coach(es)

Legend

- (C) Team captain
- (S) Suspended
- (I) Ineligible
- (W) Walk-on
- Injured
- Current redshirt

== Schedule and results ==
Date time, TV	Rank^{#}	Opponent^{#}	Result	Record	Site (attendance) city, state
Exhibition
Nov 9, 1991*		Samara-Russia	L 80–91	–	Norfolk Scope; Norfolk, Virginia
Nov 16, 1991*		Marathon Oil	W 82–79	–	Norfolk Scope; Norfolk, Virginia
Regular season
Nov 25, 1991*		Roanoke	W 83–71	1–0	ODU Fieldhouse; Norfolk, Virginia
Nov 30, 1991*		South Florida	L 71–90	1–1	Norfolk Scope; Norfolk, Virginia
Dec 2, 1991*		at Iona	L 71–86	1–2	Hynes Athletics Center; New Rochelle, New York
Dec 7, 1991*		VCU	L 83–98	1–3	Norfolk Scope; Norfolk, Virginia
Dec 14, 1991*		at No. 20 Alabama	L 67–105	1–4	Coleman Coliseum; Tuscaloosa, Alabama
Dec 23, 1991*		West Virginia	W 83–82	2–4	Norfolk Scope; Norfolk, Virginia
Dec 28, 1991*		Virginia; Richmond Times Dispatch Tournament	L 67–83	2–5	Norfolk Scope; Norfolk, Virginia
Dec 29, 1991*		at VCU; Richmond Times Dispatch Tournament	W 67–66	3–5	Richmond Coliseum; Richmond, Virginia
Jan 4, 1992*		at Virginia Tech	L 62–78	3–6	Cassell Coliseum; Blacksburg, Virginia
Jan 11, 1992		George Mason	W 80–73	4–6 (1–0)	Norfolk Scope; Norfolk, Virginia
Jan 13, 1992		at George Washington	W 86–85	5–6 (2–0)	Charles E. Smith Center; Washington, D.C.
Jan 15, 1992		American	L 74–79	5–7 (2–1)	Norfolk Scope; Norfolk, Virginia
Jan 18, 1992		at James Madison	L 76–92	5–8 (2–2)	JMU Convocation Center; Harrisonburg, Virginia
Jan 22, 1992		Richmond	L 77–82	5–9 (2–3)	Norfolk Scope; Norfolk, Virginia
Jan 25, 1992		at East Carolina	W 80–72	6–9 (3–3)	Williams Arena at Minges Coliseum; Greenville, North Carolina
Jan 29, 1992		at UNC Wilmington	L 62–83	6–10 (3–4)	Trask Coliseum; Wilmington, North Carolina
Feb 1, 1992		William & Mary	W 102–92 ^{OT}	7–10 (4–4)	Norfolk Scope; Norfolk, Virginia
Feb 5, 1992*		Penn State	L 79–84	7–11	Norfolk Scope; Norfolk, Virginia
Feb 8, 1992		at George Mason	W 71–61	8–11 (5–4)	EagleBank Arena; Fairfax, Virginia
Feb 12, 1992		at American	L 69–83	8–12 (5–5)	Bender Arena; Washington, D.C.
Feb 15, 1992		James Madison	W 72–71	9–12 (6–5)	Norfolk Scope; Norfolk, Virginia
Feb 17, 1992		at Richmond	L 69–73	9–13 (6–6)	Robins Center; Richmond, Virginia
Feb 22, 1992		East Carolina	W 89–83 ^{OT}	10–13 (7–6)	Norfolk Scope; Norfolk, Virginia
Feb 24, 1992*		at Penn State	L 51–71	10–14	Rec Hall; University Park, Pennsylvania
Feb 26, 1992		UNC Wilmington	W 69–68	11–14 (8–6)	Norfolk Scope; Norfolk, Virginia
Feb 29, 1992		at William & Mary	W 94–85	12–14 (9–6)	Kaplan Arena; Williamsburg, Virginia
CAA tournament
Mar 7, 1992*	(4)	vs. (5) UNC Wilmington; Quarterfinals	W 77–67	13–14	Richmond Coliseum; Richmond, Virginia
Mar 8, 1992*	(4)	vs. (1) Richmond; Semifinals	W 62–58	14–14	Richmond Coliseum; Richmond, Virginia
Mar 9, 1992*	(4)	vs. (2) James Madison; Championship Game	W 78–73	15–14	Richmond Coliseum; Richmond, Virginia
NCAA tournament
Mar 20, 1992*	(15 E)	vs. (2 E) No. 6 Kentucky; First Round	L 69–88	15–15	Centrum in Worcester; Worcester, Massachusetts
*Non-conference game. ^{#}Rankings from AP poll. (#) Tournament seedings in parentheses. E=East. All times are in Eastern Time.
