= Anthony Read (disambiguation) =

Anthony Read may refer to:

- Anthony Read, British writer
- Antony Read, British Army officer
- Anthony Reid, British racing driver
- Anthony Reed, American basketball player
- Anthony Reid (academic), Australian academic
