= 1992 CAA men's basketball tournament =

- Classification: Division I
- Season: 1991–92
- Teams: 8
- Site: Richmond Coliseum; Richmond, VA
- Champions: Old Dominion (3rd title)
- Winning coach: Oliver Purnell (1st title)
- MVP: Ricardo Leonard (Old Dominion)

1991–92 CAA men's basketball standings
	Conf.				Overall
Team	W		L	PCT	W		L	PCT
Richmond	12	–	2	.857	22	–	8	.733
James Madison	12	–	2	.857	21	–	11	.656
American	8	–	6	.571	11	–	18	.379
Old Dominion †	8	–	6	.571	15	–	15	.500
UNC Wilmington	6	–	8	.429	13	–	15	.464
East Carolina	4	–	10	.286	10	–	18	.357
William & Mary	3	–	11	.214	10	–	19	.345
George Mason	3	–	11	.214	7	–	21	.250
† 1992 CAA tournament winner Rankings from AP Poll

The 1992 Colonial Athletic Association men's basketball tournament was held March 7–9 at the Richmond Coliseum in Richmond, Virginia.

In only their first year in the CAA, Old Dominion defeated James Madison in the championship game, 78–73, to win their third CAA men's basketball tournament. The Monarchs, therefore, earned an automatic bid to the 1992 NCAA tournament.

Old Dominion rejoined the CAA from the Sun Belt Conference prior to the season, replacing Navy, who departed to join the Patriot League.

== Bracket ==
Quarterfinals; Saturday, March 7
1	Richmond	74
8	George Mason	59
5	UNC Wilmington	67
4	Old Dominion	77
3	American	76
6	East Carolina	69
7	William & Mary	53
2	James Madison	77

Semifinals; Sunday, March 8
1	Richmond	58
4	Old Dominion	62
3	American	59
2	James Madison	81

Championship; Monday, March 9
4	Old Dominion	78
2	James Madison	73
