= 2021–22 Virginia Tech Hokies men's basketball team =

American college basketball season

2021–22 Virginia Tech Hokies men's basketball

ACC tournament champions

NCAA tournament, First Round
- Conference: Atlantic Coast Conference
- Record: 23–13 (11–9 ACC)
- Head coach: Mike Young (3rd season)
- Associate head coach: Mike Jones
- Assistant coaches: Christian Webster; Kevin Giltner
- Home arena: Cassell Coliseum

2021–22 ACC men's basketball standings
	Conf.				Overall
Team	W		L	PCT	W		L	PCT
No. 9 Duke	16	–	4	.800	32	–	7	.821
North Carolina	15	–	5	.750	29	–	10	.744
Notre Dame	15	–	5	.750	24	–	11	.686
Miami (FL)	14	–	6	.700	26	–	11	.703
Wake Forest	13	–	7	.650	25	–	10	.714
Virginia	12	–	8	.600	21	–	14	.600
Virginia Tech †	11	–	9	.550	23	–	13	.639
Florida State	10	–	10	.500	17	–	14	.548
Syracuse	9	–	11	.450	16	–	17	.485
Clemson	8	–	12	.400	17	–	16	.515
Louisville	6	–	14	.300	13	–	19	.406
Boston College	6	–	14	.300	13	–	20	.394
Pittsburgh	6	–	14	.300	11	–	21	.344
Georgia Tech	5	–	15	.250	12	–	20	.375
NC State	4	–	16	.200	11	–	21	.344
† 2022 ACC tournament winner Rankings from AP poll

The 2021–22 Virginia Tech Hokies men's basketball team represented Virginia Polytechnic Institute and State University during the 2021–22 NCAA Division I men's basketball season. The Hokies are led by third-year head coach Mike Young and played their home games at Cassell Coliseum in Blacksburg, Virginia, as members of the Atlantic Coast Conference. They finished the season 23–13, 11–9 in ACC play to finish in seventh place. As the No. 7 seed, they defeated Clemson, Notre Dame, North Carolina, and Duke to win the ACC tournament. They received the conference's automatic bid to the NCAA tournament as the No. 11 seed in the East Region, where they lost in the first round to Texas.

== Previous season ==
The Hokies finished the 2020–21 season 15–7, 9–4 in ACC play, to finish in third place. They lost to North Carolina in the quarterfinals of the ACC tournament after earning a double-bye into the quarterfinals. They received an at-large bid to the NCAA tournament as the No. 10 seed in the South Region where they lost to Florida in the first round.

== Offseason ==
=== Departures ===
Departures
Name	Number	Pos.	Height	Weight	Year	Hometown	Reason for departure
Joe Bamisile	1	G	6'4"	195	Freshman	Chesterfield, VA	Transferred to George Washington
Cartier Diarra	2	G	6'4"	185	Graduate Student	Florence, SC	Graduated
Wabissa Bede	3	G	6'1"	195	Graduate Student	North Andover, MA	Graduated
Grant Yates	10	F	6'8"	205	RS Sophomore	Gainesville, VA	Walk-on; didn't return
Gill Williamson	11	F	6'8"	195	Freshman	Richmond, VA	Walk-on; didn't return
Jalen Cone	15	G	5'10"	165	Sophomore	Walkertown, NC	Transferred to Northern Arizona
Tyrece Radford	23	G	6'2"	200	RS Sophomore	Baton Rouge, LA	Transferred to Texas A&M
Cordell Pemsl	35	F	6'9"	250	Graduate Student	Dubuque, IA	Graduated

=== Incoming transfers ===
Incoming transfers
Name	Number	Pos.	Height	Weight	Year	Hometown	Previous school
Storm Murphy	5	G	6'0"	185	Graduate Student	Middleton, WI	Wofford
Lynn Kidd	15	C	6'10"	240	Sophomore	Gainesville, FL	Clemson

=== 2021 recruiting class ===
College recruiting information
Name	Hometown	School	Height	Weight	Commit date
Sean Pedulla #38 PG	Edmond, OK	Edmond Memorial High School	6 ft 1 in (1.85 m)	175 lb (79 kg)	Oct 19, 2020
Sean Pedulla #38 PG	Recruit ratings: Scout: Rivals: 247Sports: ESPN: (78)				
Jalen Haynes #28 C	Fort Lauderdale, FL	Monteverde Academy	6 ft 8 in (2.03 m)	225 lb (102 kg)	Apr 15, 2021
Jalen Haynes #28 C	Recruit ratings: Scout: Rivals: 247Sports: ESPN: (78)				
Overall recruit ranking:
Note: In many cases, Scout, Rivals, 247Sports, On3, and ESPN may conflict in their listings of height and weight.; In these cases, the average was taken. ESPN grades are on a 100-point scale.; Sources: "Virginia Tech Hokies". ESPN.; "2021 Team Ranking". Rivals.

=== 2022 Recruiting class ===
College recruiting information (2022)
Name	Hometown	School	Height	Weight	Commit date
M. J. Collins #20 SG	Clover, SC	Westminster Catawba Christian	6 ft 3 in (1.91 m)	175 lb (79 kg)	Jul 4, 2021
M. J. Collins #20 SG	Recruit ratings: Scout: Rivals: 247Sports: ESPN: (82)				
Pat Wessler #45 C	Charlotte, NC	Combine Academy	7 ft 0 in (2.13 m)	225 lb (102 kg)	Sep 19, 2021
Pat Wessler #45 C	Recruit ratings: Scout: Rivals: 247Sports: ESPN: (79)				
Overall recruit ranking:
Note: In many cases, Scout, Rivals, 247Sports, On3, and ESPN may conflict in their listings of height and weight.; In these cases, the average was taken. ESPN grades are on a 100-point scale.; Sources: "Virginia Tech Hokies". ESPN.; "2021 Team Ranking". Rivals.

== Roster ==
2021–22 Virginia Tech Hokies men's basketball team
Players
Coaches

Pos.	#	Name	Height	Weight	Year	Previous school	Hometown
G	0	Hunter Cattoor	6 ft 3 in (1.91 m)	200 lb (91 kg)	Jr	Bishop Moore	Orlando, FL
F	1	David N'Guessan	6 ft 9 in (2.06 m)	205 lb (93 kg)	So	Mt. Zion Prep	De Lier, Netherlands
G	3	Sean Pedulla	6 ft 1 in (1.85 m)	190 lb (86 kg)	Fr	Edmond Memorial	Edmond, OK
G	4	Nahiem Alleyne	6 ft 4 in (1.93 m)	195 lb (88 kg)	Jr	Mountain View	Buford, GA
G	5	Storm Murphy	6 ft 0 in (1.83 m)	185 lb (84 kg)	GS	Wofford	Middleton, WI
G	10	Camden Johnson (W)	6 ft 1 in (1.85 m)	175 lb (79 kg)	Fr	Metrolina Christian Academy	Waxhaw, NC
F	11	Jalen Haynes	6 ft 8 in (2.03 m)	250 lb (113 kg)	Fr	Montverde Academy	Fort Lauderdale, FL
G	13	Dairus Maddox	6 ft 5 in (1.96 m)	185 lb (84 kg)	So	Oak Hill Academy	Bowie, MD
G	14	Ben Varga (W)	5 ft 10 in (1.78 m)	170 lb (77 kg)	Fr	St. Xavier	Louisville, KY
C	15	Lynn Kidd	6 ft 10 in (2.08 m)	240 lb (109 kg)	So	Clemson	Gainesvlle, FL
C	21	John Ojiako	6 ft 10 in (2.08 m)	245 lb (111 kg)	Jr	Admiral Farragut	Lagos, Nigeria
F	22	Keve Aluma	6 ft 9 in (2.06 m)	235 lb (107 kg)	RS Sr	Wofford	Berlin, MD
F	25	Justyn Mutts	6 ft 7 in (2.01 m)	230 lb (104 kg)	GS	Delaware	Millville, NJ

Head coach

- Mike Young (Emory & Henry)

Assistant coach(es)

- Mike Jones (Old Dominion)
- Christian Webster (Harvard)
- Kevin Giltner (Wofford)

Legend

- (C) Team captain
- (S) Suspended
- (I) Ineligible
- (W) Walk-on
- Injured
- Current redshirt

Roster

== Schedule and results ==
Date time, TV	Rank^{#}	Opponent^{#}	Result	Record	High points	High rebounds	High assists	Site (attendance) city, state
Regular season
November 9, 2021*; 8:00 p.m., ACCNX		Maine	W 82–47	1–0	15 – Tied	7 – Tied	6 – Mutts	Cassell Coliseum (6,473); Blacksburg, VA
November 12, 2021*; 8:30 p.m., CBSSN		at Navy; Veterans Classic	W 77–57	2–0	20 – Aluma	7 – Mutts	4 – Cattoor	Alumni Hall (4,787); Annapolis, MD
November 15, 2021*; 7:00 p.m., ACCNX		Radford; New River Valley rivalry	W 65–39	3–0	17 – Murphy	9 – Cattoor	3 – Tied	Cassell Coliseum (6,835); Blacksburg, VA
November 18, 2021*; 8:00 p.m., ACCN		Saint Francis (PA)	W 85–55	4–0	18 – Tied	8 – N'Guessan	3 – Murphy	Cassell Coliseum (6,437); Blacksburg, VA
November 21, 2021*; 4:00 p.m., ACCRSN		Merrimack	W 72–43	5–0	14 – Murphy	7 – Mutts	5 – Mutts	Cassell Coliseum (4,730); Blacksburg, VA
November 24, 2021*; 9:30 p.m., ESPN2		vs. No. 9 Memphis; NIT Season Tip-Off semifinals	L 61–69	5–1	21 – Alleyne	12 – Mutts	4 – Alleyne	Barclays Center (2,804); Brooklyn, NY
November 26, 2021*; 7:00 p.m., ESPN2		vs. No. 25 Xavier; NIT Season Tip-Off 3rd place game	L 58–59	5–2	18 – Alleyne	11 – Mutts	4 – Cattoor	Barclays Center (0); Brooklyn, NY
December 1, 2021*; 7:15 p.m., ESPN2		at Maryland; ACC–Big Ten Challenge	W 62–58	6–2	17 – Aluma	12 – Aluma	4 – Tied	Xfinity Center (15,988); College Park, MD
December 4, 2021; 2:00 p.m., ACCN		Wake Forest	L 61–80	6–3 (0–1)	23 – Aluma	9 – Aluma	5 – Aluma	Cassell Coliseum (8,925); Blacksburg, VA
December 8, 2021*; 9:00 p.m., ACCN		Cornell	W 93–60	7–3	16 – Aluma	9 – N'Guessan	4 – Tied	Cassell Coliseum (6,403); Blacksburg, VA
December 12, 2021*; 2:00 p.m., ESPN2		at Dayton	L 57–62	7–4	14 – Tied	10 – Mutts	5 – Murphy	UD Arena (13,407); Dayton, OH
December 17, 2021*; 4:00 p.m., ESPN2		vs. St. Bonaventure; Basketball Hall of Fame Shootout	W 86–49	8–4	21 – Cattoor	7 – Mutts	4 – Aluma	Spertrum Center (0); Charlotte, NC
December 22, 2021; 9:00 p.m., ESPN2		at No. 2 Duke	L 65–76	8–5 (0–2)	25 – Aluma	10 – Aluma	4 – Murphy	Cameron Indoor Stadium (9,314); Durham, NC
January 4, 2022; 7:00 p.m., ACCN		NC State	L 63–68	8–6 (0–3)	18 – Aluma	7 – Mutts	5 – Murphy	Cassell Coliseum (5,148); Blacksburg, VA
January 12, 2022; 9:00 p.m., ESPN2		at Virginia; Rivalry	L 52–54	8–7 (0–4)	22 – Aluma	6 – Tied	5 – Cattoor	John Paul Jones Arena (13,573); Charlottesville, VA
January 15, 2022; 6:00 p.m., ACCN		Notre Dame	W 79–73	9–7 (1–4)	24 – Mutts	8 – Aluma	3 – Mutts	Cassell Coliseum (8,925); Blacksburg, VA
January 19, 2022; 7:00 p.m., ACCN		at NC State	W 62–59	10–7 (2–4)	13 – Mutts	11 – Aluma	4 – Tied	PNC Arena (13,286); Raleigh, NC
January 22, 2022; 12:00 p.m., ACCRSN		at Boston College	L 63–68	10–8 (2–5)	21 – Aluma	8 – Aluma	3 – Tied	Conte Forum (4,714); Chestnut Hill, MA
January 24, 2022; 8:00 p.m., ACCN		at North Carolina; Rescheduled from December 29	L 68–78	10–9 (2–6)	19 – Aluma	10 – Mutts	4 – Pedulla	Dean Smith Center (19,357); Chapel Hill, NC
January 26, 2022; 7:00 p.m., ACCN		Miami (FL)	L 75–78	10–10 (2–7)	14 – Aluma	10 – Mutts	8 – Mutts	Cassell Coliseum (7,086); Blacksburg, VA
January 29, 2022; 3:00 p.m., ABC		at Florida State	W 85–72	11–10 (3–7)	27 – Cattoor	5 – Mutts	5 – Murphy	Donald L. Tucker Civic Center (11,500); Tallahassee, Florida
February 2, 2022; 9:00 p.m., ACCN		Georgia Tech	W 81–66	12–10 (4–7)	24 – Aluma	8 – Mutts	4 – Mutts	Cassell Coliseum (6,887); Blacksburg, VA
February 5, 2022; 7:00 p.m., ACCN		at Pittsburgh	W 76–71	13–10 (5–7)	20 – Murphy	5 – Mutts	4 – Murphy	Petersen Events Center (8,533); Pittsburgh, PA
February 7, 2022; 7:00 p.m., ACCN		Pittsburgh; Rescheduled from January 1	W 74–47	14–10 (6–7)	18 – Aluma	9 – Mutts	7 – Pedulla	Cassell Coliseum (8,925); Blacksburg, VA
February 12, 2022; 6:00 p.m., ESPN2		Syracuse	W 71–59	15–10 (7–7)	20 – Aluma	14 – Mutts	11 – Mutts	Cassell Coliseum (8,925); Blacksburg, VA
February 14, 2022; 7:00 p.m., ESPN		Virginia; Rivalry	W 62–53	16–10 (8–7)	24 – Aluma	8 – Aluma	5 – Mutts	Cassell Coliseum (9,825); Blacksburg, VA
February 19, 2022; 4:00 p.m., ESPN2		North Carolina	L 57–65	16–11 (8–8)	16 – Aluma	9 – Aluma	4 – Murphy	Cassell Coliseum (9,825); Blacksburg, VA
February 23, 2022; 9:00 p.m., ACCN		at Georgia Tech	W 62–58	17–11 (9–8)	12 – 3 tied	10 – Aluma	3 – Tied	McCamish Pavilion (4,150); Atlanta, GA
February 26, 2022; 3:00 p.m., ACCRSN		at Miami (FL)	W 71–70	18–11 (10–8)	18 – Aluma	10 – Aluma	6 – Tied	Watsco Center (5,979); Coral Gables, FL
March 1, 2022; 9:00 p.m., ESPN2		Louisville	W 75–43	19–11 (11–8)	14 – Mutts	10 – Mutts	6 – Mutts	Cassell Coliseum (8,925); Blacksburg, VA
March 5, 2022; 2:00 p.m., ACCRSN		at Clemson	L 59–63	19–12 (11–9)	17 – Alleyne	9 – Mutts	3 – Aluma	Littlejohn Coliseum (7,295); Clemson, SC
ACC tournament
March 9, 2022; 7:00 p.m., ESPN2	(7)	vs. (10) Clemson; Second round	W 76–75 ^{OT}	20–12	19 – Aluma	10 – Aluma	4 – Murphy	Barclays Center (8,174); Brooklyn, NY
March 10, 2022; 7:00 p.m., ESPN2	(7)	vs. (2) Notre Dame; Quarterfinals	W 87–80	21–12	20 – Aluma	10 – Mutts	5 – Mutts	Barclays Center; Brooklyn, NY
March 11, 2022; 9:30 p.m., ESPN	(7)	vs. (3) No. 25 North Carolina; Semifinals	W 72–59	22–12	20 – Maddox	6 – Maddox	7 – Murphy	Barclays Center (15,994); Brooklyn, NY
March 12, 2022; 8:30 p.m., ESPN	(7)	vs. (1) No. 7 Duke; Championship	W 82–67	23–12	31 – Cattoor	10 – Aluma	7 – Aluma	Barclays Center (17,764); Brooklyn, NY
NCAA tournament
March 18, 2022; 4:30 p.m., TBS	(11 E)	vs. (6 E) No. 25 Texas; First Round	L 73–81	23–13	19 – Pedulla	6 – Aluma	5 – Mutts	Fiserv Forum (17,500); Milwaukee, WI
*Non-conference game. ^{#}Rankings from AP Poll. (#) Tournament seedings in parentheses. All times are in Eastern Time.

== Rankings ==
Ranking movements Legend: ██ Increase in ranking ██ Decrease in ranking — = Not ranked RV = Received votes
	Week																			
Poll	Pre	1	2	3	4	5	6	7	8	9	10	11	12	13	14	15	16	17	18	Final
AP	RV	RV	RV	RV	—	—	RV	—	—	—	—	—	—	—	—	—	—	—	RV	Not released
Coaches	RV	RV^	RV	—	—	—	—	—	—	—	—	—	—	—	—	—	—	—	24	RV

*AP does not release post-NCAA tournament rankings
^Coaches did not release a Week 1 poll.
