= 1991–92 South Florida Bulls men's basketball team =

American college basketball season

1991–92 South Florida Bulls men's basketball

NCAA tournament first round
- Conference: Metro Conference (1975–1995)
- Record: 19–10 (7–5 Metro)
- Head coach: Bobby Paschal (6th season)
- Associate head coach: Dennis Donaldson
- Assistant coaches: Tommy Tonelli; Dwayne Olinger; Kris Kearney
- Home arena: USF Sun Dome

1991–92 Metro Conference men's basketball standings
	Conf.				Overall
Team	W		L	PCT	W		L	PCT
Tulane	8	–	4	.667	22	–	9	.710
UNC Charlotte †	7	–	5	.583	23	–	9	.719
South Florida	7	–	5	.583	19	–	10	.655
Louisville	7	–	5	.583	19	–	11	.633
VCU	5	–	7	.417	14	–	15	.483
Southern Miss	5	–	7	.417	13	–	16	.448
Virginia Tech	3	–	9	.250	10	–	18	.357
† 1992 Metro Conference tournament winner Rankings from AP poll

The 1991–92 South Florida Bulls men's basketball team represented the University of South Florida Bulls in the 1991–92 NCAA Division I men's basketball season. This was the 21st season in school history. The team was coached by Bobby Paschal in his sixth year at the school, and USF played its home games in the USF Sun Dome. The Bulls finished the season 19–10, 7–5 in Metro Conference play, and received an at-large bid to the NCAA tournament. USF lost to Georgetown in the first round.

== Roster ==
1991–92 South Florida Bulls men's basketball team
Players
Coaches

Pos.	#	Name	Height	Weight	Year	Hometown
F	3	David Williams	6 ft 6 in (1.98 m)	—	So	Washington, D.C.
F	5	Fred Lewis	6 ft 7 in (2.01 m)	200 lb (91 kg)	Jr	Tampa, FL
G	10	Gerard Arcement	6 ft 5 in (1.96 m)	—	Sr	Stockton, CA
G	12	Corey Allen	6 ft 0 in (1.83 m)	—	Sr	Bronx, NY
F	21	Gary Alexander	6 ft 7 in (2.01 m)	230 lb (104 kg)	Sr	Jacksonville, FL
G	24	Derrick Sharp	6 ft 1 in (1.85 m)	—	Jr	Orlando, FL
G	31	Radenko Dobraš	6 ft 7 in (2.01 m)	190 lb (86 kg)	Sr	Banja Luka, Yugoslavia
F	32	Bobby Russell	6 ft 5 in (1.96 m)	—	Sr	Fort Lauderdale, FL
C	33	Jarvis Jackson	6 ft 7 in (2.01 m)	—	Fr	Chattahoochee, FL
G	34	Chad Dollar	6 ft 1 in (1.85 m)	—	So	Atlanta, GA
F	44	Landon Edmond	6 ft 7 in (2.01 m)	—	Sr	San Jose, CA
F	54	Scott Roczey	6 ft 9 in (2.06 m)	—	Sr	Cerritos, CA

Head coach

- Bobby Paschal

Assistant coach(es)

- Dennis Donaldson
- Tommy Tonelli
- Dwayne Olinger
- Kris Kearney (Graduate assistant)

Legend

- (C) Team captain
- (S) Suspended
- (I) Ineligible
- (W) Walk-on
- Injured
- Current redshirt

== Schedule and results ==
Date time, TV	Rank^{#}	Opponent^{#}	Result	Record	Site city, state
Regular season
Nov 22, 1991*		Stetson	W 91–75	1–0	Sun Dome; Tampa, FL
Nov 26, 1991*		Alcorn State	W 104–84	2–0	Sun Dome; Tampa, FL
Nov 30, 1991*		at Old Dominion	W 90–71	3–0	Norfolk Scope; Norfolk, VA
Dec 6, 1991*		vs. Wyoming; Key Centurion Memorial Classic	W 85–68	4–0	Cam Henderson Center; Huntington, WV
Dec 7, 1991*		vs. Oral Roberts; Key Centurion Memorial Classic	L 92–99	4–1	Cam Henderson Center; Huntington, WV
Dec 15, 1991*		at Florida	W 73–71	5–1	Stephen C. O'Connell Center; Gainesville, FL
Dec 20, 1991*		Florida State	W 92–88	6–1	Sun Dome; Tampa, FL
Dec 27, 1991*		Northeastern Illinois; Tampa Tribune Holiday Invitational	W 96–77	7–1	Sun Dome; Tampa, FL
Dec 28, 1991*		No. 23 Iowa; Tampa Tribune Holiday Invitational	W 85–78	8–1	Sun Dome; Tampa, FL
Dec 31, 1991*		at Cincinnati	L 60–80	8–2	Fifth Third Arena; Cincinnati, OH
Jan 4, 1992*		TCU	W 78–67	9–2	Sun Dome; Tampa, FL
Jan 7, 1992*		at Florida International	W 73–52	10–2	Golden Panther Arena; Miami, FL
Jan 11, 1992		No. 22 Charlotte	L 75–85	10–3	Sun Dome; Tampa, FL
Jan 16, 1992		at No. 25 Louisville	L 47–60	10–4	Freedom Hall; Louisville, KY
Jan 18, 1992		at VCU	W 71–63	10–5	Richmond Coliseum; Richmond, VA
Jan 23, 1992*		Bethune-Cookman	W 66–47	11–5	Sun Dome; Tampa, FL
Jan 25, 1992*		at TCU	L 49–77	11–6	Daniel–Meyer Coliseum; Fort Worth, TX
Feb 1, 1992		Virginia Tech	W 64–52	12–6	Sun Dome; Tampa, FL
Feb 6, 1992*		No. 14 Tulane	L 70–78 ^{OT}	12–7	Sun Dome; Tampa, FL
Feb 8, 1992		at Southern Miss	L 63–87	12–8	Reed Green Coliseum; Hattiesburg, MS
Feb 13, 1992		Louisville	W 69–66	13–8	Sun Dome; Tampa, FL
Feb 15, 1992		at No. 22 Charlotte	W 70–63	14–8	Charlotte Coliseum; Charlotte, NC
Feb 18, 1992*		Marshall	W 88–79	15–8	Sun Dome; Tampa, FL
Feb 22, 1992		at Virginia Tech	W 75–62	16–8	Cassell Coliseum; Blacksburg, VA
Feb 24, 1992		at No. 15 Tulane	W 81–76	17–8	Devlin Fieldhouse; New Orleans, LA
Feb 29, 1992		VCU	W 91–81	18–8	Sun Dome; Tampa, FL
Mar 4, 1992		Southern Miss	W 78–72	19–8	Sun Dome; Tampa, FL
Metro Conference tournament
Mar 13, 1992*		vs. Southern Miss; Quarterfinals	L 87–92 ^{2OT}	19–9	Freedom Hall; Louisville, KY
NCAA tournament
Mar 19, 1992*	(11 W)	vs. (6 W) No. 22 Georgetown; First round	L 60–75	19–10	BSU Pavilion; Boise, ID
*Non-conference game. ^{#}Rankings from AP Poll. (#) Tournament seedings in parentheses. W=West.

== Rankings ==
Ranking movements Legend: ██ Increase in ranking ██ Decrease in ranking — = Not ranked RV = Received votes
	Week																			
Poll	Pre	1	2	3	4	5	6	7	8	9	10	11	12	13	14	15	16	17	18	Final
AP	—	—	—	—	—	—	RV	—	—	—	—	—	—	—	—	—	—			Not released
Coaches	—	—	—	—	—	—	—	—	—	—	—	—	—	—	—	—	—			
