= Perry Clark =

American basketball player-coach

Biographical details
- Born: December 4, 1951 (age 74); Washington, D.C., U.S.

Playing career
- 1971–1974: Gettysburg
- Position: Guard

Coaching career (HC unless noted)
- 1975–1978: DeMatha Catholic HS (MD) (assistant)
- 1978–1982: Penn State (assistant)
- 1982–1988: Georgia Tech (assistant)
- 1989–2000: Tulane
- 2000–2004: Miami (FL)
- 2007–2011: Texas A&M–Corpus Christi
- 2013–2020: South Carolina (assistant)

Head coaching record
- Overall: 304–270 (.530)
- Tournaments: 3–4 (NCAA Division I); 5–5 (NIT)

Accomplishments and honors

Championships
- Metro regular season (1992)

Awards
- Henry Iba Award (1992); UPI Coach of the Year (1992); 2x Metro Coach of the Year (1991, 1992)

Perry Clark (born December 4, 1951) is an American former college basketball coach and the former head men's basketball coach at the University of Miami. He previously served as head coach of Tulane University, and later at Texas A&M University-Corpus Christi. From June 2013, until his retirement in June 2020, Clark was an assistant coach for the University of South Carolina basketball team.

Clark has over 30 years of collegiate coaching experience, including 15 years combined as head coach at both Tulane University and the University of Miami (Florida). As a head coach, Clark owned a 304–270 (.530) record, including seven 20-win seasons and nine postseason appearances (3 NCAA, 4 NIT) and won the Metro Conference championship in 1992. The 1992 National Coach of the Year, he was a two-time Metro Conference Coach of the Year (1991, 1992).

== Early career ==
Clark began his coaching career as an assistant coach at DeMatha Catholic High School. In 1978 he became an assistant coach at Penn State. Beginning in 1982, he served as the recruiting coordinator at Georgia Tech. During this time, five players earned honors as the top freshman – Mark Price (1983), Bruce Dalrymple (1984), Duane Ferrell (1985), Tom Hammonds (1986) and Dennis Scott (1988). At Tulane, Anthony Reed (1990), Kim Lewis (1991) and Pointer Williams (1992) claimed consecutive Metro Conference Freshman of the Year honors. Clark has coached 19 players who were drafted or have gone on to play in the NBA. Thirteen of those draftees have gone in the first or second rounds, including 2002 selection John Salmons, who was taken with the 26th pick of the first round by the San Antonio Spurs, and James Jones, who was a second-round selection by the Indiana Pacers in the 2003 NBA draft. In his stints at Georgia Tech and Tulane, Clark went a phenomenal eight for nine, from 1983 to 1992, in helping produce the conference's top rookie, including a Metro record three in a row at Tulane.

== Miami ==
He took over the program at Miami in 2000 and spent four seasons with the Hurricanes, where he led them to a 65–54 (.546) record. In his first three seasons with the program, he accumulated 51 wins, the most ever by a Hurricane coach, and became the only Miami coach to take the Hurricanes to the postseason in each of his first two seasons.

Clark's 2001–02 Hurricane squad finished 24–8 and received the school's fourth NCAA Tournament berth and set a school record for wins in a season. Included in the 24 wins were a school-record 14 consecutive victories to open the season. His Hurricanes were not ranked in the preseason, but were ranked for the final 13 weeks of the campaign, ending the year ranked No. 21 according to the Associated Press.

== Texas A&M Corpus Christi ==
In four seasons at Texas A&M-Corpus Christi, Clark led the Islanders to a 54–71 (.432) overall record. His 2008–09 squad doubled its win total from the previous season and Kevin Palmer earned Southland Newcomer of the Year honors after posting 18.2 points per game in leading a team in which no player had more than a season of NCAA Division I experience.

== Head coaching record ==
Record table
Season	Team	Overall	Conference	Standing	Postseason
Tulane Green Wave (Metro Conference) (1989–1995)
1989–90	Tulane	4–24	1–13	8th	
1990–91	Tulane	15–13	7–7	T–4th	
1991–92	Tulane	22–9	8–4	1st	NCAA Division I Second Round
1992–93	Tulane	22–9	9–3	2nd	NCAA Division I Second Round
1993–94	Tulane	18–11	7–5	T–2nd	NIT Second Round
1994–95	Tulane	23–10	7–5	T–2nd	NCAA Division I Second Round
Tulane Green Wave (Conference USA) (1995–2000)
1995–96	Tulane	22–10	9–5	1st (Red)	NIT Third Place
1996–97	Tulane	20–11	11–3	1st (Red)	NIT First Round
1997–98	Tulane	7–22	2–14	T–5th (National)	
1998–99	Tulane	12–15	6–10	T–2nd (National)	
1999–00	Tulane	20–11	8–8	T–1st (National)	NIT First Round
Tulane:		185–145 (.561)	75–77 (.493)		
Miami Hurricanes (Big East Conference) (2000–2004)
2000–01	Miami	16–13	8–8	T–3rd (East)	NIT First Round
2001–02	Miami	24–8	10–6	2nd (East)	NCAA Division I First Round
2002–03	Miami	11–17	4–12	T–6th (East)	
2003–04	Miami	14–16	4–12	T–12th	
Miami (FL):		65–54 (.546)	26–38 (.406)		
Texas A&M–Corpus Christi Islanders (Southland Conference) (2007–2011)
2007–08	Texas A&M–Corpus Christi	9–20	6–10	T–5th (West)	
2008–09	Texas A&M–Corpus Christi	18–15	11–5	2nd (West)	
2009–10	Texas A&M–Corpus Christi	17–15	10–6	2nd (West)	
2010–11	Texas A&M–Corpus Christi	10–21	5–11	6th (West)	
Texas A&M–Corpus Christi:		54–71 (.432)	32–32 (.500)		
Total:		304–270 (.530)			
National champion Postseason invitational champion Conference regular season champion Conference regular season and conference tournament champion Division regular season champion Division regular season and conference tournament champion Conference tournament champion
