= Anthony Reed =

American basketball player

Personal information
- Born: January 3, 1971 (age 55) Monroe, Louisiana, U.S.
- Listed height: 6 ft 6 in (1.98 m)
- Listed weight: 220 lb (100 kg)

Career information
- High school: Wossman (Monroe, Louisiana)
- College: Tulane (1989–1993)
- NBA draft: 1993: 2nd round, 41st overall pick
- Drafted by: Chicago Bulls
- Playing career: 1993–1999
- Position: Small forward

Career history
- 1993: KK Split
- 1993: Dinamo Sassari
- 1994: Saski Baskonia
- 1994–1996: Olimpija Ljubljana
- 1996–1997: APOEL
- 1998: Trotamundos
- 1998–1999: Nagoya Diamond Dolphins

Career highlights
- 2× Slovenian League champion (1995, 1996); Slovenian League All-Star (1996); Slovenian Cup winner (1995); 2× First-team All-Metro Conference (1991, 1993); 2× Second-team All-Metro Conference (1990, 1992); Metro Conference Freshman of the Year (1990); No. 55 retired by Tulane
- Stats at Basketball Reference

Anthony Lavell Reed (born January 3, 1971) is an American former professional basketball player. After playing high school basketball in his native state of Louisiana, Reed played college basketball at Tulane, being named the Metro Conference Freshman of the Year and gaining all-conference selections in each of his 4 seasons. He ended his career at Tulane as the all-time leading scorer with 1,896 total points (a record since passed by Jerald Honeycutt) and as the 4th best rebounder in program history with 871 total rebounds. Reed was selected in the second round (41st overall) of the 1993 NBA draft by the Chicago Bulls but was waived before the start of the NBA season, and he moved to Europe where he played in Croatia, Italy, Spain, Slovenia and Cyprus. He also played in Venezuela and ended his career in 1999 after one season in Japan. In 2015 he was inducted in the Louisiana Basketball Hall of Fame.

== High school career ==
Reed was born in Monroe, Louisiana and played varsity basketball at Wossman High School in his native town. He played the center and forward positions and in his junior year he averaged 17 points and 6 rebounds per game, being selected in the All-District 2-AAA First Team. At the end of his senior season he was a 1988–89 Triple-A All-State Boys Team Honorable Mention, and was named the MVP of the all-star game organized by the Louisiana High School Basketball Coaches Association (LHSBCA), having recorded 14 points and 10 rebounds playing for the East team.

== College career ==
Reed signed for Tulane in mid-November 1988. Coach Perry Clark chose Reed to be part of the starting five since his freshman year: Reed started all 28 games, led the team in rebounding (8.4) and minutes per game (35.3), and was second in scoring (18.4 points per game) behind Michael Christian. He set records for most points scored for a freshman in Tulane history with 514, and highest scoring average for a freshman with 18.4; he scored 20 or more points on 12 occasions. At the end of the season he received the Metro Conference Freshman of the Year award, and was selected in the All-Metro Conference second team.

The following year Reed again started all games and led his team in scoring (16 points per game), minutes (34.3), rebounding (7.9) and blocks (0.8). On December 8, 1989, Reed scored a career-high 32 points in a game against Tennessee Tech. His performances during his sophomore year earned him a first-team All-Metro Conference selection. Reed's junior year saw him lead the team in rebounding (6.5) and minutes per game (28.1) for the third straight season; he also ranked second on his team in scoring with a 14.4 points per game average behind Kim Lewis (15.4). That year Tulane won the Metro Conference title, with Reed as one of the main contributors. At the end of the season he was named in the NABC All-District first team, in the All-Conference second team, and in the All-Metro Tournament team. Tulane also qualified for the 1992 NCAA tournament: Reed played both games (against St. John's and Oklahoma State), scoring 12 points in each of them.

Reed's final season at Tulane saw him leading the team again in scoring (15.7 points), rebounding (6.8), minutes (33.5) and blocks (0.9). On December 23, 1992, he recorded a career-high 6 blocks against Jackson State. He also led the team in 3-point percentage (despite only attempting a single three-pointer in the previous 3 seasons), with .324 (33 of 102). On March 6, 1993 (senior day) his jersey number, 55, was retired by Tulane: in that night's game against South Florida Reed scored his 1,853rd point, becoming the all-time leader for career points at Tulane. At the end of the year Reed was selected in the All-Metro Conference first team and participated in the 1993 NABC all-star game. In the 1993 NCAA tournament Reed played both games: he scored 12 points against Kansas State and 11 against Florida State.

Reed retired with 118 games played (all starts) and 1,896 total points (which at the time made him the leading scorer in program history: the record has since been passed by Jerald Honeycutt). He ranks 9th in scoring average, 1st in field goals scored (802) and 2nd in field goals attempted (1,642), 4th in total rebounds with 871, 8th in total blocks (95) and tallied 3,858 total minutes. He recorded 26 career double-doubles and 32 20-point games. Reed contributed to bring Tulane to be nationally ranked during his last two seasons, and was inducted in the Louisiana Basketball Hall of Fame in 2015.

=== College statistics ===
Year	Team	GP	GS	MPG	FG%	3P%	FT%	RPG	APG	SPG	BPG	PPG
1989–90	Tulane	28	28	35.3	.533	.000	.658	8.4	0.8	1.1	0.8	18.4
1990–91	Tulane	28	28	34.3	.489	.000	.546	7.9	1.2	1.3	0.8	16.0
1991–92	Tulane	31	31	28.1	.477	.000	.624	6.5	1.0	1.5	0.7	14.4
1992–93	Tulane	31	31	33.5	.459	.324	.630	6.8	1.0	1.7	0.9	15.7
Career		118	118	32.7	.488	.320	.617	7.4	1.0	1.4	0.8	16.1

== Professional career ==
After the end of his senior season, Reed was automatically eligible for the 1993 NBA draft, during which he was selected by the Chicago Bulls with the 14th pick in the second round (41st overall). Reed participated in the Bulls preseason camp in July 1993 and also participated in the Rocky Mountain Revue in Salt Lake City. He signed a contract with the Bulls on October 1, but the team waived him on October 26. Reed then moved to Europe and joined KK Split in Croatia: he then moved to Dinamo Sassari and played 1 game in the Italian Lega Basket Serie A, scoring 8 points and grabbing 4 rebounds in 30 minutes of play.

In 1994 Reed moved to Spain and signed for Liga ACB team Saski Baskonia: he played 6 games in the regular season and 4 in the playoffs, averaging 7.1 points and 6 rebounds per game. After his experience in Spain he moved to Slovenia, joining Olimpija Ljubljana: he spent two seasons there, winning two national titles and one national cup; in 1996 he was also named a Slovenian league All-Star. After two seasons in Slovenia he moved to Cyprus, joining APOEL B.C. in Nicosia. In September 1997 Reed signed with Estudiantes de Olavarría of the Liga Nacional de Básquet in Argentina, but only played in friendly games during preseason before being released on September 18, 1997. In 1998 he briefly played for Trotamundos de Carabobo in Venezuela, being released after 10 days in February 1998 replaced by Puerto Rican player Charlie Lanauze, and he retired in 1999 after playing for the Nagoya Diamond Dolphins in Japan.

Despite being listed at 2.06 m (6 ft 9 in) throughout his whole career in the United States, later on, during his period in Europe, he was measured at 1.99 m (6 ft 6 1/2 in).
