= 1991–92 UNC Charlotte 49ers men's basketball team =

American college basketball season

1991–92 UNC Charlotte 49ers men's basketball
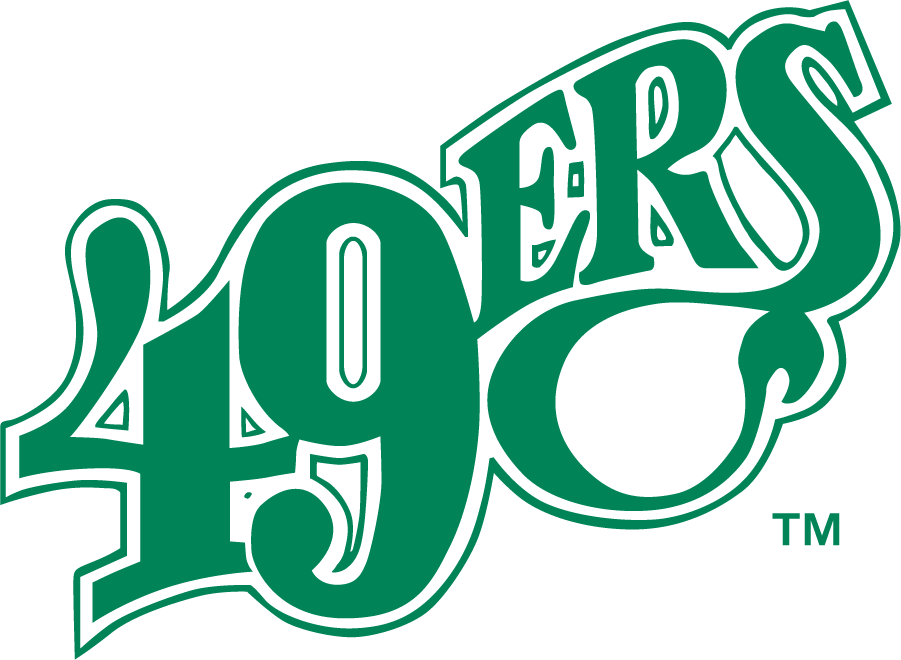

Metro Conference tournament champion

NCAA tournament
- Conference: Metro Conference (1975–1995)
- Record: 23–9 (7–5 Metro)
- Head coach: Jeff Mullins (7th season)
- Home arena: Charlotte Coliseum; Belk Gymnasium (alternate)

1991–92 Metro Conference men's basketball standings
	Conf.				Overall
Team	W		L	PCT	W		L	PCT
Tulane	8	–	4	.667	22	–	9	.710
UNC Charlotte †	7	–	5	.583	23	–	9	.719
South Florida	7	–	5	.583	19	–	10	.655
Louisville	7	–	5	.583	19	–	11	.633
VCU	5	–	7	.417	14	–	15	.483
Southern Miss	5	–	7	.417	13	–	16	.448
Virginia Tech	3	–	9	.250	10	–	18	.357
† 1992 Metro Conference tournament winner Rankings from AP poll

The 1991–92 UNC Charlotte 49ers men's basketball team represented the University of North Carolina at Charlotte in the 1991–92 college basketball season. This was head coach Jeff Mullins's seventh season at Charlotte. The 49ers competed in the Metro Conference and played their home games at Dale F. Halton Arena. They finished the season 23–9 (7–5 in Metro play) and won the Metro Conference tournament. The 49ers lost in the opening round to Iowa State.

== Roster ==
1991–92 UNC Charlotte 49ers men's basketball team
Players
Coaches

Pos.	#	Name	Height	Weight	Year	Hometown
F	23	Jarvis Lang	6 ft 7 in (2.01 m)	230 lb (104 kg)	Jr	Farmville, North Carolina
SG	34	Henry Williams	6 ft 3 in (1.91 m)	180 lb (82 kg)	Sr	Indianapolis, Indiana

Head coach

- Jeff Mullins

Assistant coach(es)

Legend

- (C) Team captain
- (S) Suspended
- (I) Ineligible
- (W) Walk-on
- Injured
- Current redshirt

== Schedule and results ==
Date time, TV	Rank^{#}	Opponent^{#}	Result	Record	Site city, state
Regular season
Nov 23, 1991*		College of Charleston	L 54–68	0–1	Charlotte Coliseum; Charlotte, North Carolina
Nov 25, 1991*		Long Beach State	W 72–49	1–1	Charlotte Coliseum; Charlotte, North Carolina
Dec 2, 1991*		at Appalachian State	W 83–68	2–1	Varsity Gymnasium; Boone, North Carolina
Dec 6, 1991*		No. 20 DePaul	W 68–63	3–1	Charlotte Coliseum; Charlotte, North Carolina
Dec 7, 1991*		No. 15 Alabama	W 79–74	4–1	Charlotte Coliseum; Charlotte, North Carolina
Dec 16, 1991*	No. 24	North Carolina A&T	W 90–59	5–1	Charlotte Coliseum; Charlotte, North Carolina
Dec 20, 1991*	No. 24	vs. William & Mary; Kauai Classic	W 83–75	6–1	Kauaʻi, Hawaii
Dec 21, 1991*	No. 24	vs. Chaminade; Kauai Classic	W 110–77	7–1	Kauaʻi, Hawaii
Jan 4, 1992*	No. 21	Coastal Carolina	W 76–61	8–1	Charlotte Coliseum; Charlotte, North Carolina
Jan 6, 1992*	No. 22	at UNC Wilmington	W 99–89 ^{OT}	9–1	Trask Coliseum; Wilmington, North Carolina
Jan 8, 1992	No. 22	Virginia Tech	W 62–53	10–1 (1–0)	Charlotte Coliseum; Charlotte, North Carolina
Jan 11, 1992	No. 22	at South Florida	W 85–75	11–1 (2–0)	Sun Dome; Tampa, Florida
Jan 16, 1992	No. 18	at Southern Miss	W 77–69	12–1 (3–0)	Reed Green Coliseum; Hattiesburg, Mississippi
Jan 18, 1992*	No. 18	at No. 1 Duke	L 82–104	12–2	Cameron Indoor Stadium (9,314); Durham, North Carolina
Jan 21, 1992*	No. 19	Davidson	W 82–70	13–2	Charlotte Coliseum; Charlotte, North Carolina
Jan 23, 1992*	No. 19	Johnson C. Smith	W 82–80 ^{OT}	14–2	Charlotte Coliseum; Charlotte, North Carolina
Jan 27, 1992*	No. 17	at Butler	L 84–87	14–3	Hinkle Fieldhouse; Indianapolis, Indiana
Jan 30, 1992	No. 17	No. 24 Louisville	W 77–68 ^{OT}	15–3 (4–0)	Charlotte Coliseum; Charlotte, North Carolina
Feb 6, 1992	No. 20	at Louisville	L 63–73	15–4 (4–1)	Freedom Hall; Louisville, Kentucky
Feb 8, 1992*	No. 20	at Davidson	W 95–85	16–4	John M. Belk Arena; Davidson, North Carolina
Feb 13, 1992	No. 22	No. 14 Tulane	L 68–76	16–5 (4–2)	Charlotte Coliseum; Charlotte, North Carolina
Feb 15, 1992	No. 22	South Florida	L 63–70	16–6 (4–3)	Charlotte Coliseum; Charlotte, North Carolina
Feb 20, 1992		Southern Miss	W 77–61	17–6 (5–3)	Charlotte Coliseum; Charlotte, North Carolina
Feb 22, 1992		at VCU	L 66–69	17–7 (5–4)	Richmond Coliseum; Richmond, Virginia
Feb 24, 1992*		Tennessee	W 72–65	18–7	Charlotte Coliseum; Charlotte, North Carolina
Feb 29, 1992		at Virginia Tech	L 65–73	18–8 (5–5)	Cassell Coliseum; Blacksburg, Virginia
Mar 2, 1992		at No. 21 Tulane	W 79–69	19–8 (6–5)	Devlin Fieldhouse; New Orleans, Louisiana
Mar 4, 1992		VCU	W 75–63	20–8 (7–5)	Charlotte Coliseum; Charlotte, North Carolina
Metro Conference tournament
Mar 13, 1992*	(2)	vs. (7) Virginia Tech; Quarterfinals	W 70–52	21–8	Freedom Hall; Louisville, Kentucky
Mar 14, 1992*	(2)	vs. (6) Southern Miss; Semifinals	W 76–72	22–8	Freedom Hall; Louisville, Kentucky
Mar 15, 1992*	(2)	vs. (1) No. 25 Tulane; Championship Game	W 64–63	23–8	Freedom Hall; Louisville, Kentucky
NCAA tournament
Mar 20, 1992*	(7 E)	vs. (10 E) Iowa State; First Round	L 74–76	23–9	Centrum in Worcester; Worcester, Massachusetts
*Non-conference game. ^{#}Rankings from AP Poll. (#) Tournament seedings in parentheses.

== Players in the 1992 NBA draft ==
Round	Pick	Player	NBA Club
2	44	Henry Williams	San Antonio Spurs
