= 1991–92 Louisville Cardinals men's basketball team =

American college basketball season

1991–92 Louisville Cardinals men's basketball

NCAA tournament, Round of 32
- Conference: Metro Conference (1975–1995)
- Record: 19–11 (7–5 Metro)
- Head coach: Denny Crum (21st season)
- Home arena: Freedom Hall

1991–92 Metro Conference men's basketball standings
	Conf.				Overall
Team	W		L	PCT	W		L	PCT
Tulane	8	–	4	.667	22	–	9	.710
UNC Charlotte †	7	–	5	.583	23	–	9	.719
South Florida	7	–	5	.583	19	–	10	.655
Louisville	7	–	5	.583	19	–	11	.633
VCU	5	–	7	.417	14	–	15	.483
Southern Miss	5	–	7	.417	13	–	16	.448
Virginia Tech	3	–	9	.250	10	–	18	.357
† 1992 Metro Conference tournament winner Rankings from AP poll

The 1991–92 Louisville Cardinals men's basketball team represented the University of Louisville in the 1991–92 NCAA Division I men's basketball season. The head coach was Denny Crum and the team finished the season with an overall record of 19–11.
