= 1992–93 Tulane Green Wave men's basketball team =

American college basketball season

1992–93 Tulane Green Wave men's basketball

NCAA tournament, second round
- Conference: Metro Conference (1975–1995)
- Record: 22–9 (9–3 Metro)
- Head coach: Perry Clark (4th season)
- Assistant coach: Greg Gary (1st season)
- Home arena: Devlin Fieldhouse

1992–93 Metro Conference men's basketball standings
	Conf.				Overall
Team	W		L	PCT	W		L	PCT
No. 15 Louisville †	11	–	1	.917	22	–	9	.710
Tulane	9	–	3	.750	22	–	9	.710
VCU	7	–	5	.583	20	–	10	.667
UNC Charlotte	6	–	6	.500	15	–	13	.536
Southern Miss	6	–	6	.500	10	–	17	.370
South Florida	2	–	10	.167	8	–	19	.296
Virginia Tech	1	–	11	.083	10	–	18	.357
† 1993 Metro Conference tournament winner Rankings from AP Poll

The 1992–93 Tulane Green Wave men's basketball team represented Tulane University in the 1992–93 college basketball season. This was head coach Perry Clark's fourth season at Tulane. The Green Wave competed in the Metro Conference and played their home games at Devlin Fieldhouse. They finished the season 22–9 (9–3 in Metro play) and finished second in the conference regular season standings. Tulane lost in the quarterfinal round of the Metro Conference tournament, but received an at-large bid to the 1993 NCAA tournament. The Green Wave defeated Kansas State in the opening round before losing to Florida State in the round of 32.

== Roster ==
1992–93 Tulane Green Wave men's basketball team
Players
Coaches

Pos.	#	Name	Height	Weight	Year	Hometown
G	23	Kim Lewis	6 ft 4 in (1.93 m)	—	Jr
F	55	Anthony Reed	6 ft 9 in (2.06 m)	220 lb (100 kg)	Sr	Monroe, Louisiana
F		Carlin Hartman	6 ft 7 in (2.01 m)	—	Jr	Grand Island, New York
G		Pointer Williams	6 ft 0 in (1.83 m)	—	So	New Orleans, Louisiana

Head coach

- Perry Clark

Assistant coach(es)

- Greg Gary

Legend

- (C) Team captain
- (S) Suspended
- (I) Ineligible
- (W) Walk-on
- Injured
- Current redshirt

== Schedule and results ==
Date time, TV	Rank^{#}	Opponent^{#}	Result	Record	Site city, state
Regular season
Nov 18, 1992*		Wagner; Preseason NIT First Round	W 70–54	1–0	Avron B. Fogelman Arena; New Orleans, Louisiana
Nov 20, 1992*		at No. 4 Indiana; Preseason NIT Second Round	L 92–102	1–1	Assembly Hall; Bloomington, Indiana
Dec 3, 1992*		Nicholls State	W 96–54	2–1	Avron B. Fogelman Arena; New Orleans, Louisiana
Dec 5, 1992*		SMU	W 103–92 ^{OT}	3–1	Avron B. Fogelman Arena; New Orleans, Louisiana
Dec 9, 1992*	No. 20	at No. 21 Memphis State	W 86–85	4–1	The Pyramid; Memphis, Tennessee
Dec 12, 1992*		Northwestern State	W 91–81	5–1	Avron B. Fogelman Arena; New Orleans, Louisiana
Dec 15, 1992*		at UAB	L 69–75	5–2	Bartow Arena; Birmingham, Alabama
Dec 23, 1992*		Jackson State	L 84–92	5–3	Avron B. Fogelman Arena; New Orleans, Louisiana
Dec 27, 1992*		Hofstra	W 64–55	6–3	Avron B. Fogelman Arena; New Orleans, Louisiana
Dec 30, 1992*		Prairie View A&M	W 107–74	7–3	Avron B. Fogelman Arena; New Orleans, Louisiana
Jan 2, 1993*		UC Irvine	W 86–65	8–3	Avron B. Fogelman Arena (3,500); New Orleans, Louisiana
Jan 4, 1993*		at Mercer	W 70–52	9–3	Macon Coliseum; Macon, Georgia
Jan 9, 1993		Virginia Tech	W 84–72	10–3 (1–0)	Avron B. Fogelman Arena; New Orleans, Louisiana
Jan 13, 1993*		Texas Tech	W 70–54	11–3	Avron B. Fogelman Arena; New Orleans, Louisiana
Jan 16, 1993		at Southern Miss	W 84–71	12–3 (2–0)	Reed Green Coliseum; Hattiesburg, Mississippi
Jan 21, 1993		at VCU	W 84–76	13–3 (3–0)	Richmond Coliseum; Richmond, Virginia
Jan 23, 1993		at South Florida	W 71–53	14–3 (4–0)	Sun Dome; Tampa, Florida
Jan 30, 1993		Southern Miss	W 65–52	15–3 (5–0)	Avron B. Fogelman Arena; New Orleans, Louisiana
Feb 4, 1993		at Virginia Tech	W 72–59	16–3 (6–0)	Cassell Coliseum; Blacksburg, Virginia
Feb 7, 1993		at UNC Charlotte	L 64–68 ^{OT}	16–4 (6–1)	Charlotte Coliseum; Charlotte, North Carolina
Feb 11, 1993		Louisville	W 62–60	17–4 (7–1)	Avron B. Fogelman Arena; New Orleans, Louisiana
Feb 15, 1993*		Canisius	W 63–41	18–4	Avron B. Fogelman Arena; New Orleans, Louisiana
Feb 18, 1993		UNC Charlotte	W 75–70	19–4 (8–1)	Avron B. Fogelman Arena; New Orleans, Louisiana
Feb 20, 1993*		Florida Atlantic	W 87–62	20–4	Avron B. Fogelman Arena; New Orleans, Louisiana
Feb 22, 1993*	No. 16	at Temple	L 57–79	20–5	McGonigle Hall; Philadelphia, Pennsylvania
Feb 27, 1993		at Louisville	L 67–94	20–6 (8–2)	Freedom Hall; Louisville, Kentucky
Mar 4, 1993		VCU	L 65–77 ^{OT}	20–7 (8–3)	Avron B. Fogelman Arena; New Orleans, Louisiana
Mar 6, 1993		South Florida	W 91–75	21–7 (9–3)	Avron B. Fogelman Arena; New Orleans, Louisiana
Metro Conference tournament
Mar 12, 1993*	(2)	vs. (7) Virginia Tech; First round	L 55–64	21–8	Freedom Hall; Louisville, Kentucky
NCAA tournament
Mar 18, 1993*	(11 SE)	vs. (6 SE) Kansas State; First round	W 55–53	22–8	Orlando Arena; Orlando, Florida
Mar 20, 1993*	(11 SE)	vs. (3 SE) No. 11 Florida State; Second round	L 63–94	22–9	Orlando Arena; Orlando, Florida
*Non-conference game. ^{#}Rankings from AP Poll. (#) Tournament seedings in parentheses.
