= 1993 Metro Conference men's basketball tournament =

- Classification: Division I
- Season: 1992–93
- Teams: 7
- Site: Freedom Hall; Louisville, Kentucky
- Champions: Louisville (9th title)
- Winning coach: Denny Crum (9th title)
- MVP: Dwayne Morton (Louisville)

1992–93 Metro Conference men's basketball standings
| | Conf. | | | | Overall |
| Team | W | | L | PCT | W | | L | PCT |
|---|---|---|---|---|---|---|---|---|
| No. 15 Louisville † | 11 | – | 1 | .917 | 22 | – | 9 | .710 |
| Tulane | 9 | – | 3 | .750 | 22 | – | 9 | .710 |
| VCU | 7 | – | 5 | .583 | 20 | – | 10 | .667 |
| UNC Charlotte | 6 | – | 6 | .500 | 15 | – | 13 | .536 |
| Southern Miss | 6 | – | 6 | .500 | 10 | – | 17 | .370 |
| South Florida | 2 | – | 10 | .167 | 8 | – | 19 | .296 |
| Virginia Tech | 1 | – | 11 | .083 | 10 | – | 18 | .357 |
† 1993 Metro Conference tournament winner Rankings from AP Poll

The 1993 Metro Conference men's basketball tournament was held March 12–14 at Freedom Hall in Louisville, Kentucky.

Louisville defeated VCU in the championship game, 90–78, to win their ninth Metro men's basketball tournament.

The Cardinals received an automatic bid to the 1993 NCAA Tournament.

== Format ==
All seven of the conference's members participated. They were seeded based on regular season conference records, with the top team earning a bye into the semifinal round. The other six teams entered into the preliminary first round.

== Bracket ==
First round Friday, March 12
4 | Charlotte | 68
5 | Southern Miss | 60
6 | South Florida | 72
3 | VCU | 79
7 | Virginia Tech | 64
2 | Tulane | 55

Semifinals; Saturday, March 13
1 | Louisville | 71
4 | Charlotte | 59
3 | VCU | 85
7 | Virginia Tech | 71

Championship; Sunday, March 14
1 | Louisville | 90
3 | VCU | 78
