= 1992 Metro Conference men's basketball tournament =

- Classification: Division I
- Season: 1991–92
- Teams: 7
- Site: Freedom Hall; Louisville, Kentucky
- Champions: UNC Charlotte (1st title)
- Winning coach: Jeff Mullins (1st title)
- MVP: Henry Williams (UNC Charlotte)

1991–92 Metro Conference men's basketball standings
	Conf.				Overall
Team	W		L	PCT	W		L	PCT
Tulane	8	–	4	.667	22	–	9	.710
UNC Charlotte †	7	–	5	.583	23	–	9	.719
South Florida	7	–	5	.583	19	–	10	.655
Louisville	7	–	5	.583	19	–	11	.633
VCU	5	–	7	.417	14	–	15	.483
Southern Miss	5	–	7	.417	13	–	16	.448
Virginia Tech	3	–	9	.250	10	–	18	.357
† 1992 Metro Conference tournament winner Rankings from AP poll

The 1992 Metro Conference men's basketball tournament was held March 13–15 at Freedom Hall in Louisville, Kentucky.

UNC Charlotte defeated Tulane in the championship game, 64–63, to win their first Metro men's basketball tournament.

Although the conference was not granted an automatic bid to the NCAA tournament, four of its teams (Charlotte, Louisville, South Florida, and Tulane) received at-large bids.

== Format ==
All seven of the conference's members participated. They were seeded based on regular season conference records, with the top team earning a bye into the semifinal round. The other six teams entered into the preliminary first round.

== Bracket ==
First round Friday, March 13
4	Louisville	65
5	VCU	74
6	Southern Miss	92
3	South Florida	87
7	Virginia Tech	52
2	UNC Charlotte	70

Semifinals; Saturday, March 14
1	Tulane	87
5	VCU	69
6	Southern Miss	72
2	UNC Charlotte	76

Championship; Sunday, March 15
1	Tulane	63
2	UNC Charlotte	64
