= 1991–92 Tulane Green Wave men's basketball team =

American college basketball season

1991–92 Tulane Green Wave men's basketball

Metro Conference Regular Season Champion

NCAA tournament, second round
- Conference: Metro Conference (1975–1995)

Ranking
- Coaches: No. 25
- Record: 22–9 (8–4 Metro)
- Head coach: Perry Clark (3rd season)
- Home arena: Devlin Fieldhouse

1991–92 Metro Conference men's basketball standings
	Conf.				Overall
Team	W		L	PCT	W		L	PCT
Tulane	8	–	4	.667	22	–	9	.710
UNC Charlotte †	7	–	5	.583	23	–	9	.719
South Florida	7	–	5	.583	19	–	10	.655
Louisville	7	–	5	.583	19	–	11	.633
VCU	5	–	7	.417	14	–	15	.483
Southern Miss	5	–	7	.417	13	–	16	.448
Virginia Tech	3	–	9	.250	10	–	18	.357
† 1992 Metro Conference tournament winner Rankings from AP poll

The 1991–92 Tulane Green Wave men's basketball team represented Tulane University in the 1991–92 college basketball season. This was head coach Perry Clark's third season at Tulane. The Green Wave competed in the Metro Conference and played their home games at Devlin Fieldhouse. They finished the season 22–9 (8–4 in Metro play) and finished atop the conference regular season standings. Tulane lost by a point in the championship game of the Metro Conference tournament, but received an at-large bid to the 1992 NCAA tournament – the first tournament appearance in program history. The Green Wave defeated St. John's in the opening round before losing to Oklahoma State in the round of 32 – a game in which the Cowboys shot an astronomical 80% from the field.

== Roster ==
1991–92 Tulane Green Wave men's basketball team
Players
Coaches

Pos.	#	Name	Height	Weight	Year	Hometown
G	23	Kim Lewis	6 ft 4 in (1.93 m)	—	So
F		David Whitmore	6 ft 5 in (1.96 m)	—	Sr
G		Greg Gary	6 ft 2 in (1.88 m)	—	Sr	Anderson, Indiana
F		Carlin Hartman	6 ft 7 in (2.01 m)	—	So	Grand Island, New York
F	55	Anthony Reed	6 ft 9 in (2.06 m)	220 lb (100 kg)	Jr	Monroe, Louisiana
G		Pointer Williams	6 ft 0 in (1.83 m)	—	Fr	New Orleans, Louisiana

Head coach

- Perry Clark

Assistant coach(es)

Legend

- (C) Team captain
- (S) Suspended
- (I) Ineligible
- (W) Walk-on
- Injured
- Current redshirt

Roster

== Schedule and results ==
Date time, TV	Rank^{#}	Opponent^{#}	Result	Record	Site city, state
Regular season
Nov 22, 1991*		Samford	W 75–48	1–0	Devlin Fieldhouse; New Orleans, Louisiana
Nov 25, 1991*		at Nicholls State	W 72–64	2–0	Stopher Gymnasium; Thibodaux, Louisiana
Nov 27, 1991*		Prairie View A&M	W 120–64	3–0	Devlin Fieldhouse; New Orleans, Louisiana
Dec 4, 1991*		Northwestern	W 88–79	4–0	Devlin Fieldhouse; New Orleans, Louisiana
Dec 7, 1991*		at SMU	W 65–56	5–0	Moody Coliseum; University Park, Texas
Dec 10, 1991*		Southern	W 97–94	6–0	Devlin Fieldhouse; New Orleans, Louisiana
Dec 21, 1991*		Mercer	W 82–56	7–0	Devlin Fieldhouse; New Orleans, Louisiana
Dec 30, 1991*		at UC Irvine	W 96–77	8–0	Bren Events Center (1,591); Irvine, California
Jan 4, 1992		at No. 24 Louisville	W 87–83 ^{OT}	9–0 (1–0)	Freedom Hall; Louisville, Kentucky
Jan 6, 1992*	No. 24	Penn	W 88–74	10–0	Devlin Fieldhouse; New Orleans, Louisiana
Jan 9, 1992*	No. 24	Central Connecticut State	W 95–68	11–0	Devlin Fieldhouse; New Orleans, Louisiana
Jan 13, 1992*	No. 19	at New Orleans	W 83–61	12–0	Lakefront Arena; New Orleans, Louisiana
Jan 16, 1992	No. 19	Virginia Tech	W 80–60	13–0 (2–0)	Devlin Fieldhouse; New Orleans, Louisiana
Jan 18, 1992*	No. 19	at Texas Tech	L 98–101	13–1	Lubbock Municipal Coliseum; Lubbock, Texas
Jan 21, 1992	No. 21	at VCU	W 87–85 ^{OT}	14–1 (3–0)	Richmond Coliseum; Richmond, Virginia
Jan 25, 1992*	No. 21	Temple	W 99–75	15–1	Devlin Fieldhouse; New Orleans, Louisiana
Jan 30, 1992	No. 16	Southern Miss	W 98–86	16–1 (4–0)	Devlin Fieldhouse; New Orleans, Louisiana
Feb 3, 1992*	No. 14	at Wake Forest	L 66–69	16–2	Lawrence Joel Coliseum; Winston-Salem, North Carolina
Feb 6, 1992	No. 14	at South Florida	W 78–70 ^{OT}	17–2 (5–0)	Sun Dome; Tampa, Florida
Feb 8, 1992	No. 14	VCU	W 97–80	18–2 (6–0)	Devlin Fieldhouse; New Orleans, Louisiana
Feb 13, 1992	No. 14	at No. 22 UNC Charlotte	W 76–68	19–2 (7–0)	Charlotte Coliseum; Charlotte, North Carolina
Feb 15, 1992	No. 14	at Virginia Tech	L 73–89	19–3 (7–1)	Cassell Coliseum; Blacksburg, Virginia
Feb 24, 1992	No. 15	South Florida	L 76–81	19–4 (7–2)	Devlin Fieldhouse; New Orleans, Louisiana
Feb 27, 1992	No. 15	Louisville	L 72–87	19–5 (7–3)	Devlin Fieldhouse; New Orleans, Louisiana
Mar 2, 1992	No. 21	UNC Charlotte	L 69–79	19–6 (7–4)	Devlin Fieldhouse; New Orleans, Louisiana
Mar 4, 1992*	No. 21	Memphis State	L 67–68	19–7	Devlin Fieldhouse; New Orleans, Louisiana
Mar 7, 1992	No. 21	at Southern Miss	W 80–70	20–7 (8–4)	Reed Green Coliseum; Hattiesburg, Mississippi
Metro Conference tournament
Mar 14, 1992*	(1)	vs. (5) VCU; Semifinals	W 87–69	21–7	Freedom Hall; Louisville, Kentucky
Mar 15, 1992*	(1)	vs. (2) UNC Charlotte; Championship Game	L 63–64	21–8	Freedom Hall; Louisville, Kentucky
NCAA tournament
Mar 20, 1992*	(10 SE)	vs. (7 SE) St. John's; First Round	W 61–57	22–8	The Omni; Atlanta, Georgia
Mar 22, 1992*	(10 SE)	vs. (2 SE) No. 11 Oklahoma State; Second Round	L 71–87	22–9	The Omni; Atlanta, Georgia
*Non-conference game. ^{#}Rankings from AP Poll. (#) Tournament seedings in parentheses.
