= 1992–93 Louisville Cardinals men's basketball team =

American college basketball season

1992–93 Louisville Cardinals men's basketball

Metro Conference tournament champions Metro Conference regular season champions

NCAA tournament, Sweet Sixteen
- Conference: Metro Conference (1975–1995)

Ranking
- Coaches: No. 15
- AP: No. 15
- Record: 22–9 (11–1 Metro)
- Head coach: Denny Crum (22nd season)
- Home arena: Freedom Hall

1992–93 Metro Conference men's basketball standings
	Conf.				Overall
Team	W		L	PCT	W		L	PCT
No. 15 Louisville †	11	–	1	.917	22	–	9	.710
Tulane	9	–	3	.750	22	–	9	.710
VCU	7	–	5	.583	20	–	10	.667
UNC Charlotte	6	–	6	.500	15	–	13	.536
Southern Miss	6	–	6	.500	10	–	17	.370
South Florida	2	–	10	.167	8	–	19	.296
Virginia Tech	1	–	11	.083	10	–	18	.357
† 1993 Metro Conference tournament winner Rankings from AP Poll

The 1992–93 Louisville Cardinals men's basketball team represented the University of Louisville in the 1992–93 NCAA Division I men's basketball season. The head coach was Denny Crum and the team finished the season with an overall record of 22–9.

== Roster ==
1993–94 Louisville Cardinals men's basketball team
Players
Coaches

Pos.	#	Name	Height	Weight	Year	Previous school	Hometown
G/F	23	Greg Minor	6 ft 6 in (1.98 m)	205 lb (93 kg)	So	Washington Co.	Sandersville, Georgia
F/C	44	Clifford Rozier	6 ft 11 in (2.11 m)	235 lb (107 kg)	So	Southeast	Bradenton, Florida
F	50	Dwayne Morton	6 ft 7 in (2.01 m)	190 lb (86 kg)	So	Central	Louisville, Kentucky

Head coach

- Denny Crum (UCLA)

Assistant coach(es)

Legend

- (C) Team captain
- (S) Suspended
- (I) Ineligible
- (W) Walk-on
- Injured
- Current redshirt

== Schedule and results ==
Date time, TV	Rank^{#}	Opponent^{#}	Result	Record	Site city, state
Regular season
Dec 9, 1992*	No. 9	at Vanderbilt	L 88–90	1–1	Memorial Gymnasium; Nashville, Tennessee
Dec 12, 1992*	No. 9	No. 3 Kentucky	L 68–88	1–2	Freedom Hall; Louisville, Kentucky
Jan 11, 1993*		Xavier	W 76–73	6–4	Freedom Hall; Louisville, Kentucky
Metro Conference tournament
Mar 13, 1993*	No. 16	UNC Charlotte; Semifinals	W 71–59	19–8	Freedom Hall; Louisville, Kentucky
Mar 14, 1993*	No. 16	VCU; Championship game	W 90–78	20–8	Freedom Hall; Louisville, Kentucky
NCAA Tournament
Mar 19, 1993*	(4 MW) No. 15	vs. (13 MW) Delaware; First round	W 76–70	21–8	RCA Dome; Indianapolis, Indiana
Mar 21, 1993*	(4 MW) No. 15	vs. (5 MW) No. 23 Oklahoma State; Second round	W 78–63	22–8	RCA Dome; Indianapolis, Indiana
Mar 25, 1993*	(4 MW) No. 15	vs. (1 MW) No. 1 Indiana; Midwest Regional semifinal – Sweet Sixteen	L 69–82	22–9	St. Louis Arena; St. Louis, Missouri
*Non-conference game. ^{#}Rankings from AP poll. (#) Tournament seedings in parentheses. MW=Midwest. All times are in Eastern Time.
