= Tulane Green Wave men's basketball =

Basketball team

2026–27 Tulane Green Wave men's basketball team
- University: Tulane University
- Head coach: Ron Hunter (8th season)
- Location: New Orleans, Louisiana
- Arena: Avron B. Fogelman Arena in New Orleans Louisiana (capacity: 4,100)
- Conference: The American
- Nickname: The Green Wave
- Colors: Olive green and sky blue
- Student section: Wave Riders

NCAA Division I tournament round of 32
- 1992, 1993, 1995

NCAA Division I tournament appearances
- 1992, 1993, 1995

Conference regular-season champions
- 1924, 1944, 1976, 1992

Uniforms
Home	Away
Alternate	Alternate

The Tulane Green Wave men's basketball team represents Tulane University in New Orleans Louisiana in NCAA Division I college basketball. The team competes in the American Athletic Conference. They play home games on campus in Devlin Fieldhouse, the ninth-oldest active basketball venue in the nation.

Tulane is the only school from the original Metro Conference that remained in the conference through its 1975 founding, the 1991 breakup that saw several schools form the Great Midwest Conference, Conference USA, and the 2004 realignment of conferences. It rejoined many of its previous conference mates when it became a member of the American Athletic Conference in 2014.

== History ==
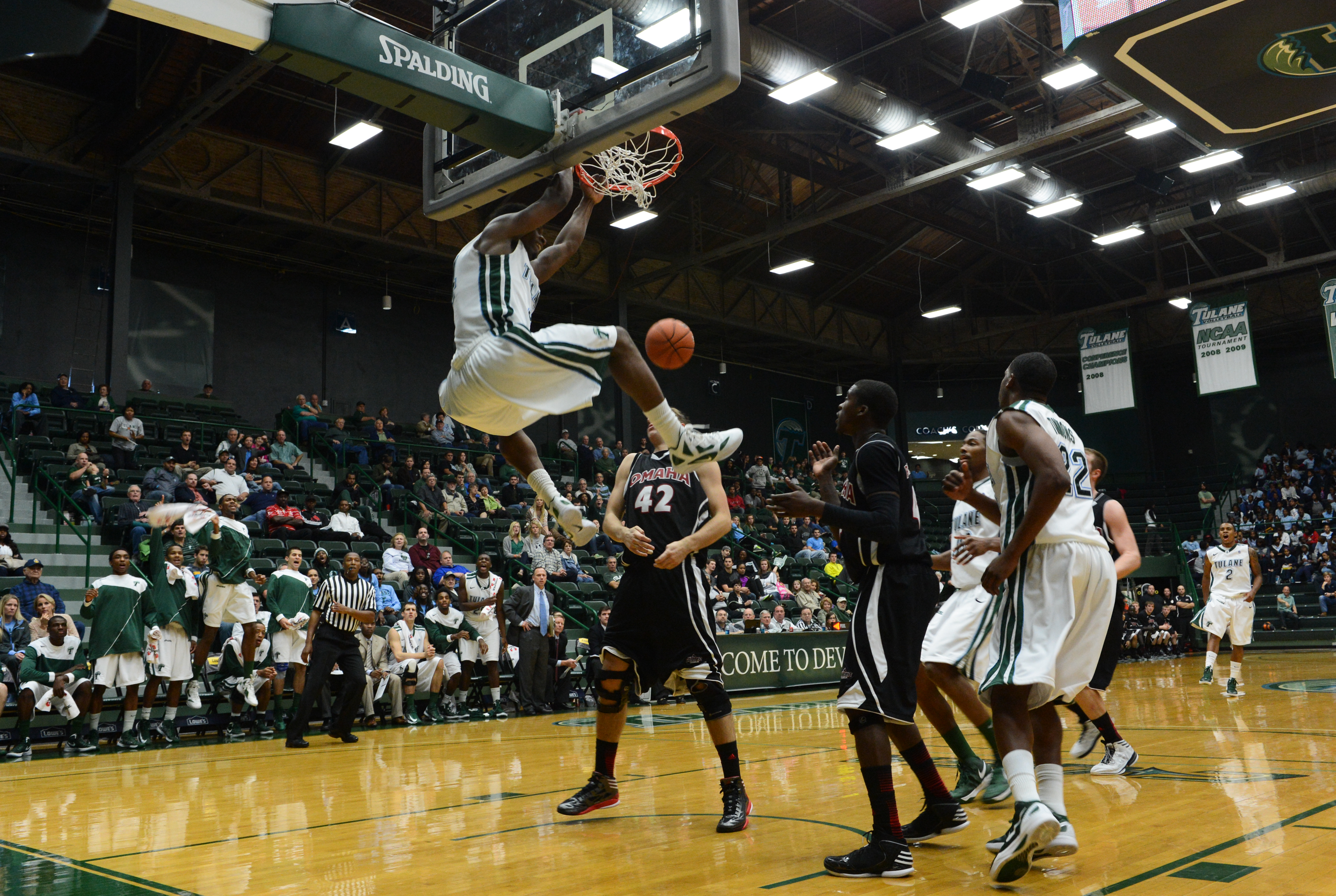
Tulane Green Wave men's basketball at Avron B. Fogelman Arena in Devlin Fieldhouse in New Orleans, Louisiana

Tulane's men's basketball team played its first game on December 9, 1905.

In March 1976, the Green Wave enticed Syracuse coach Roy Danforth--one year removed from taking the Orange to their first Final Four--to succeed Charles Moir as Green Wave coach when Moir left for the same position at Virginia Tech.

Danforth's successor at Syracuse, Jim Boeheim, coached the Orange for the next 47 seasons, winning 1,116 games and the 2003 national championship. Meanwhile, Danforth was fired by Tulane after the 1980-81 season, which included a 119–81 loss to in-state rival LSU.

Danforth's successor, Ned Fowler, led the Green Wave to a shocking 83–72 victory vs. LSU at Baton Rouge in the first round of the 1982 NIT. Tulane went on the road and defeated another national power, UNLV, in the second round before losing to Bradley in the quarterfinals.

The 1982–83 squad lost in the Metro Conference men's basketball tournament final.

The program fell victim to one of the biggest scandals of the 1980s in college sports when four players, including star forward "Hot Rod" Williams, were accused of taking money and cocaine to alter the final point spreads of games they played in. Clyde Eads and Jon Johnson were granted immunity to testify against Williams, the alleged ringleader. Although he was indicted, the judge eventually declared a mistrial, and no sentence was handed down. Williams spent the next nine years with the NBA's Cleveland Cavaliers. Within days of Williams' indictment, Fowler and his assistant coaches, and athletic director Hindman Wall all resigned. Newly-hired football coach Mack Brown became interim athletic director.

On April 4, 1985, president Eamon Kelly disbanded the basketball program. He did not intend ever to allow its return; he relented in 1988 after several students convinced him that they were being punished for something that occurred when they were not at Tulane.

New head coach Perry Clark rebuilt the program to unprecedented success, including a 1991–92 season that started 13–0. They made the Metro tournament final in 1992 and lost. However, they made it to the second round of the NCAA Tournament. The 1992–93 and 1994–95 teams matched that team's success, but Tulane has not approached such heights since. Clark resigned in 2000 to coach the Miami Hurricanes. The Green Wave failed to make any postseason tournament under Clark's successor, Shawn Finney, or under former Maryland assistant Dave Dickerson.

Ed Conroy was hired as the new head coach in 2010. His teams have seen initial success against out-of-conference foes in each of its seasons but have done poorly in conference games. The 2010–11 team finished 13–17 after a 12–3 start, while his 2011–12 team finished 15–16 after starting 14–6.

On March 14, 2016, Tulane fired Conroy after six years as head coach. He was replaced by former longtime NBA player and coach Mike Dunleavy Sr. On March 16, 2019, after a 4–27 season, the Tulane athletic department fired Dunleavy. As of 2026, the head coach is Ron Hunter.

== Popular culture ==
In the 1992 sports comedy film White Men Can't Jump, character Billy Hoyle mentions he is a former Green Wave player.

== Postseason ==
=== NCAA tournament results ===
The Green Wave have appeared in three NCAA Tournaments. Their combined record is 3–3.

Year	Seed	Round	Opponent	Result
1992	#10	First Round; Second Round	#7 St. John's #2 Oklahoma State	W 61–57; L 71–87
1993	#11	First Round; Second Round	#6 Kansas State #3 Florida State	W 55–53; L 63–94
1995	#9	First Round; Second Round	#8 BYU #1 Kentucky	W 76–70; L 60–82

=== NIT results ===
The Green Wave have appeared in six National Invitation Tournaments (NIT). Their combined record is 7–6.

Year	Round	Opponent	Result
1982	First Round; Second Round; Quarterfinals	LSU; UNLV; Bradley	W 83–72; W 56–51; L 61–77
1983	First Round	Nebraska	L 65–72
1994	First Round; Second Round	Evansville; Siena	W 76–63; L 79–89
1996	First Round; Second Round; Quarterfinals; Semifinals; 3rd Place Game	Auburn; Minnesota; Illinois State; Nebraska; Alabama	W 87–73; W 84–65; W 83–72; L 78–90; W 87–76
1997	First Round	Oklahoma State	L 72–79
2000	First Round	NC State	L 60–64

=== CBC results ===
The Green Wave have appeared in one College Basketball Crown (CBC). Their combined record is 0–1.

Year	Round	Opponent	Result
2025	First Round	USC	L 60–89

=== CBI results ===
The Green Wave have appeared in one College Basketball Invitational (CBI). Their combined record is 0–1.

Year	Round	Opponent	Result
2014	First Round	Princeton	L 55–56

=== CIT results ===
The Green Wave have appeared in one CollegeInsider.com Postseason Tournament (CIT). Their combined record is 1–1.

Year	Round	Opponent	Result
2013	First Round; Second Round	South Alabama; Bradley	W 84–73; L 72–77

== Notable players ==
The following Green Wave players have played in the NBA:

- John Arthurs
- John "Hot Rod" Williams
- Linton Johnson
- Paul Thompson
- Jerald Honeycutt
- Melvin Frazier
- Cameron Reynolds
- Sion James

Others:

- Sammis Reyes (born 1995), Chilean player who switched to American football
- Taylor Rochestie (born 1985), American-Montenegrin player in the Israel Basketball Premier League

== See also ==
- List of NCAA Division I men's basketball programs
