= Oliver Purnell =

American former college basketball coach (born 1953)

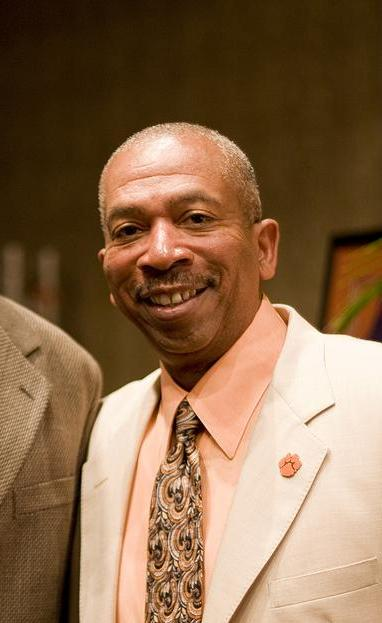
- Purnell as Clemson coach in 2007

Biographical details
- Born: May 19, 1953 (age 73); Berlin, Maryland, U.S.

Playing career
- 1972–1975: Old Dominion

Coaching career (HC unless noted)
- 1975–1977: Old Dominion (GA)
- 1977–1985: Old Dominion (assistant)
- 1985–1988: Maryland (assistant)
- 1988–1991: Radford
- 1991–1994: Old Dominion
- 1994–2003: Dayton
- 2003–2010: Clemson
- 2010–2015: DePaul

Head coaching record
- Overall: 448–386
- Tournaments: 0–6 (NCAA Division I); 10–8 (NIT)

Accomplishments and honors

Championships
- CAA tournament (1992); 2 CAA regular season (1993, 1994); Atlantic 10 tournament (2003)

Awards
- Big South Coach of the Year (1991); CAA Coach of the Year (1993); Atlantic 10 Coach of the Year (1998)
Medal record
Men's basketball
Representing United States
Olympic Games
Assistant coach for United States
Bronze medal – third place	2004 Athens	Men's basketball
FIBA Americas Championship
Assistant coach for United States
Gold medal – first place	2003 San Juan	Men's basketball

Oliver Gordon Purnell Jr. (born May 19, 1953) is an American former college basketball coach. He served as the head men's basketball coach at Radford University from 1988 to 1991, Old Dominion University from 1991 to 1994, the University of Dayton from 1994 to 2003, Clemson University from 2003 to 2010, and DePaul University from 2010 to 2015, compiling a career record of 448–386.

== Early years ==
Purnell was born in Berlin, Maryland, the second of Oliver Sr. and Phyllis' four children. He attended Stephen Decatur High School, where he played on the boys' basketball team that captured the Maryland Public Secondary Schools Athletic Association Class B championship in 1970. Purnell was recruited to play basketball at Old Dominion University in Norfolk, Virginia. While at Old Dominion, Purnell enjoyed a highly successful playing career, finishing 18th on ODU's all-time scoring list with 1,090 points and leading the Monarchs to the 1975 NCAA Division II national championship. That year, Purnell was selected by Converse as an honorable mention Division II All-American.

Purnell averaged 14.4 points a game his senior year and 13.8 as a junior. He scored 25 points against Randolph-Macon in the NCAA South Atlantic Regional Championship game in 1975. As a junior, he averaged 6.7 assists per game and tallied 181 for the season. He was accorded the team MVP honors his senior year.

Purnell also dished out 474 career assists, which placed him sixth on the school's all-time list. He still shares ODU's single game steal record with eight against Washington and Lee in 1975.

Purnell was drafted in the sixth round of the 1975 NBA draft by the Milwaukee Bucks.

Purnell was inducted into the Stephen Decatur High School Hall of Fame on September 19, 2008. He was inducted into the ODU Sports Hall of Fame in April 1988.

== Coaching career ==
Purnell became a graduate assistant coach at ODU in July 1975, eventually becoming a full-time assistant at the university. During Purnell's tenure as a full-time assistant, he helped ODU reach the postseason seven times (3 NCAAs and 4 NITs). Lefty Driesell hired Purnell in 1985 to serve as an assistant on his Maryland staff. Purnell served three seasons at Maryland before being selected as head coach at Radford University. Purnell is credited with one of the biggest one year turnarounds in NCAA history as his 1990-91 Radford club posted a 22–7 record, a 15-game improvement over the previous season. In 1991, he returned to Old Dominion to take the head coaching position. After another successful stint, in 1994, he accepted a position as head coach at the University of Dayton where he led the Flyers to two NCAA tournament appearances (2000, 2003) before accepting the head coaching job at Clemson University shortly after the #4 seeded Flyers lost to #13 Tulsa in the first round of the 2003 NCAA tournament. Purnell was the head coach of the 1999 USA World University Team and led the squad to an 8–0 record and the gold medal in Brisbane, Australia. He was the recipient of USA Basketball's 1999 Developmental Coach of the Year Award for that accomplishment. He was selected to the board of directors at the 1998 convention for the National Association of Basketball Coaches (NABC). In 2000, he was appointed by the NABC to serve as a member of USA Basketball Men's Collegiate Committee. That committee is responsible for the selection of collegiate coaches and players for USA Basketball's teams.

During his tenure at Clemson, he built the program steadily, improving each subsequent season. He served as president of the National Association of Basketball Coaches in 2006–07. At the conclusion of that season, Purnell took his team to the championship game of the NIT, losing to West Virginia in the final, following wins against Syracuse, Air Force, and Ole Miss. In 2008, he guided the Tigers to a third-place 10–6 record in the Atlantic Coast Conference and a runner-up position in the ACC Tournament in Charlotte, losing to North Carolina by 5 points. The 2007–08 season marked Clemson's first appearance in the NCAA Tournament in ten years. However, Purnell was unable to win an NCAA tournament game (0–6) during his stints with ODU, Dayton and Clemson.

On March 18, 2008, Clemson extended Purnell's contract through 2014 and raised his salary.

On April 6, 2010, Purnell signed a seven-year deal with DePaul University. At the conclusion of the 2014–2015 season, Purnell announced his resignation.

== Head coaching record ==
Record table
Season	Team	Overall	Conference	Standing	Postseason
Radford Highlanders (Big South Conference) (1988–1991)
1988–89	Radford	15–13	5–7	T–5th	
1989–90	Radford	7–22	3–9	7th	
1990–91	Radford	22–7	12–2	2nd	
Radford:		44–42 (.512)	20–18 (.526)		
Old Dominion Monarchs (Colonial Athletic Association) (1991–1994)
1991–92	Old Dominion	15–15	8–6	T–3rd	NCAA Division I First Round
1992–93	Old Dominion	21–8	11–3	T–1st	NIT Second Round
1993–94	Old Dominion	21–10	10–4	T–1st	NIT Second Round
Old Dominion:		57–33 (.633)	29–13 (.690)		
Dayton Flyers (Great Midwest Conference) (1994–1995)
1994–95	Dayton	7–20	0–12	7th	
Dayton Flyers (Atlantic 10 Conference) (1995–2003)
1995–96	Dayton	15–14	6–10	4th (West)	
1996–97	Dayton	13–14	6–10	4th (West)	
1997-98	Dayton	21–12	11–5	3rd (West)	NIT Second Round
1998-99	Dayton	11–17	5–11	5th (West)	
1999–00	Dayton	22–9	11–5	1st (West)	NCAA Division I First Round
2000–01	Dayton	21–13	9–7	6th	NIT Quarterfinal
2001–02	Dayton	21–11	10–6	3rd (West)	NIT First Round
2002–03	Dayton	24–6	14–2	2nd (West)	NCAA Division I First Round
Dayton:		155–116 (.572)	72–68 (.514)		
Clemson Tigers (Atlantic Coast Conference) (2003–2010)
2003–04	Clemson	10–18	3–13	9th	
2004–05	Clemson	16–16	5–11	9th	NIT First Round
2005–06	Clemson	19–15	7–9	9th	NIT Second Round
2006–07	Clemson	25–11	7–9	T–8th	NIT Runner-Up
2007–08	Clemson	24–10	10–6	3rd	NCAA Division I First Round
2008–09	Clemson	23–9	9–7	T–5th	NCAA Division I First Round
2009–10	Clemson	21–11	9–7	T–5th	NCAA Division I First Round
Clemson:		138–90 (.605)	50–62 (.446)		
DePaul Blue Demons (Big East Conference) (2010–2015)
2010–11	DePaul	7–24	1–17	16th	
2011–12	DePaul	12–19	3–15	16th	
2012–13	DePaul	11–21	2–16	15th	
2013–14	DePaul	12–21	3–15	10th	
2014–15	DePaul	12–20	6–12	T–7th	
DePaul:		54–105 (.340)	15–75 (.167)		
Total:		448–386 (.537)			
National champion Postseason invitational champion Conference regular season champion Conference regular season and conference tournament champion Division regular season champion Division regular season and conference tournament champion Conference tournament champion
