= Old Dominion Monarchs men's basketball =

College basketball team

| 2026–27 Old Dominion Monarchs men's basketball team |
- University: Old Dominion University
- Head coach: Mike Jones (3rd season)
- Location: Norfolk, Virginia
- Arena: Chartway Arena (capacity: 8,472)
- Conference: Sun Belt Conference
- Nickname: Monarchs
- Colors: Slate blue, silver, and light blue

NCAA Division I tournament champions
- 1975*
Other NCAA Division I tournament results
| Runner-up | 1971* |
| Final Four | 1971*, 1975*, 1976* |
| Elite Eight | 1971*, 1975*, 1976* |
| Sweet Sixteen | 1971*, 1973*, 1974*, 1975*, 1976* |
| Appearances | 1969*, 1971*, 1973*, 1974*, 1975*, 1976*, 1980, 1982, 1985, 1986, 1992, 1995, 1997, 2005, 2007, 2010, 2011, 2019 |

Conference tournament champions
- 1969, 1980, 1982, 1992, 1995, 1997, 2005, 2010, 2011, 2019

Conference regular-season champions
- 1986, 1994, 1995, 1997, 2005, 2010, 2019

Uniforms
| Home | Away | Alternate |
- * at Division II level

The Old Dominion Monarchs men's basketball team represents Old Dominion University in Norfolk, Virginia, United States in NCAA Division I men's competition. The school's team currently competes in the Sun Belt Conference.

They were the Division II national champions in 1975, champions of the inaugural CollegeInsider.com Postseason Tournament in 2009, and champions of the inaugural Vegas 16 in 2016. The team last played in the Division I NCAA tournament in 2019. The Monarchs are currently coached by Mike Jones.

== History ==
Old Dominion University has enjoyed an impressive basketball tradition. Since fielding its first team in 1930, Old Dominion has won 1,240 games in 81 years, a winning percentage of .591. Founded in 1930 as the Norfolk Division of the College of William and Mary, the institution gained independence in 1962 and became Old Dominion College. In 1969, University status was granted and the name was changed to Old Dominion University. The Monarchs have been selected for postseason play 20 times since moving up to Division I in 1976–77, eight by the NCAA and ten by the NIT. Twenty-two players have been accorded All-American honors since 1958, including first team selections Wilson Washington (1975–76), Joel Copeland (1973–74) and Dave Twardzik (1972–73).

=== Early years ===
Tommy Scott was the first coach at Old Dominion. A 1930 Graduate of VMI, he coached the Old Dominion men's basketball team (then known as the Norfolk "Braves") for 10 seasons til 1940.He amassed a record of 84–83. Additionally, he coached the football, track, and baseball teams at Old Dominion. He retired from teaching and coaching in 1941 to pursue a business career. George Stirnweiss briefly coached Old Dominion for 2 seasons in the early 1940s, going just 4–29 during his tenure. Scrap Chandler followed as head coach of Old Dominion for 3 seasons going 27–24. The Old Dominion University Natatorium is named after Scrap Chandler. Old Dominion had two coaches in two years following Scrap Chandler in the mid-1940s. Julius Rubin and Jack Callahan went 14–8 and 21–8 respectively during their seasons.

=== Bud Metheny Era ===
Bud Metheny came to Old Dominion in 1948 and served as the baseball coach from 1948 to 1980 and the head basketball coach from 1948 to 1965, compiling a 198–163 record and posting 16 winning seasons. His 198 wins were ultimately surpassed by Blaine Taylor on January 5, 2011.[1] He also served as athletic director from 1963 to 1970.

=== Sonny Allen Era ===
Sonny Allen was named head coach at Old Dominion in 1965, following athletic director Bud Metheny’s outstanding career. In ten years, Allen led the Monarchs to 181 wins, and a second place national finish at the 1970 NCAA Division II championships. In 1975 his Monarchs took the ultimate prize with the Division II National Championship.

=== Paul Webb Era ===
Paul Webb took control in 1976–77 and led the Monarchs to the first NIT bid in program history. Webb successfully guided the Old Dominion program to one of the nation's premier Division I basketball programs. In nine seasons, Webb won 196 victories and took the Big Blue to eight national postseason tournaments. Webb reached the NCAA tournament three times and the NIT five times. He also won 2 conference titles during his time as head coach of Old Dominion.

=== Tom Young Era ===
In 1985, the reins were turned over to Tom Young and he guided the Monarchs to a 23–8 mark in 1986 and an NCAA bid. The Monarchs advanced to the second round for the first time ever. In 1987–88, Old Dominion was 18–12 and earned a NIT bid.

=== Oliver Purnell Era ===
In 1991–92, former captain Oliver Purnell returned to his alma mater and led Old Dominion to the CAA title and a trip to the NCAA. In 1993 and 1994 the Monarchs advanced to the second round of the NIT.

=== Jeff Capel Era ===
Jeff Capel took over in 1994–95 and guided the Monarchs to the second round of the NCAA after a stunning victory over third seed Villanova, 89–81 in triple overtime. Capel again guided Old Dominion to a CAA title and NCAA Tournament play in 1997.

=== Blaine Taylor ===
In April 2001, Blaine Taylor became the Monarchs fifth Division I head coach. He guided ODU to the school's most wins in a single season (28) in 2004–05, winning the CAA crown and advancing to the NCAA tournament. The following year, ODU won another 24 games and reached the semi-finals of the NIT at Madison Square Garden. The 2007 Monarchs won another 24 games and advanced to the NCAA tournament as an at-large team. In 2008, ODU reached the quarterfinals of the inaugural College Basketball Invitational (CBI). In 2008–09 the Monarchs won the championship of the inaugural College Insider.com tournament with a 25–10 record. In 2009–10, ODU captured its fifth CAA title andadvanced to the second round of the NCAA tournament after beating sixth seeded Notre Dame, 51–50. In 2010–11, ODU won its second straight CAA crown and lost at the buzzer to Butler in the NCAA tournament. In 2011–12, ODU advanced to the Quarterfinals of the CIT.

=== Jeff Jones Era ===
Jeff Jones became the head coach of Old Dominion for the 2013–14 season. Jones' teams had a 203–131 record during his 11 seasons. Jeff Jones lead the Monarchs to the 2015 NIT Final Four, 2016 Vegas 16 championship, 2019 Conference USA Championship and the 2019 NCAA Tournament where they fell to eventual Elite 8 participant Purdue in the first round. After recovering from a heart attack suffered during the 2023–24 season, Jones announced his retirement from coaching following his resignation for the remainder of the season due to health issues. Special Assistant Head Coach Kieran Donohue remained as the interim head coach for the rest of the season.

=== Mike Jones Era ===
Old Dominion class of 1995 alumnus Mike Jones was named head coach of the Monarchs on March 1, 2024.

== Coaches ==
=== Current coaching staff ===
- Mike Jones – Head Coach
- Jamal Robinson – Assistant Coach
- James Robinson – Assistant Coach
- Ryan Nadeau – Assistant Coach
- Matt Hamilton – Director of Basketball Operations/Player Personnel
- Jason Wade – Graduate Assistant
- Odell Hodge – Special Assistant to the Head Coach
- Aidan Brami – Video Coordinator/Assistant Director of Operations

== Postseason results ==
=== Division I NCAA tournament results ===
The Monarchs have appeared in 12 Division I NCAA Tournaments. Their combined record is 3–12.

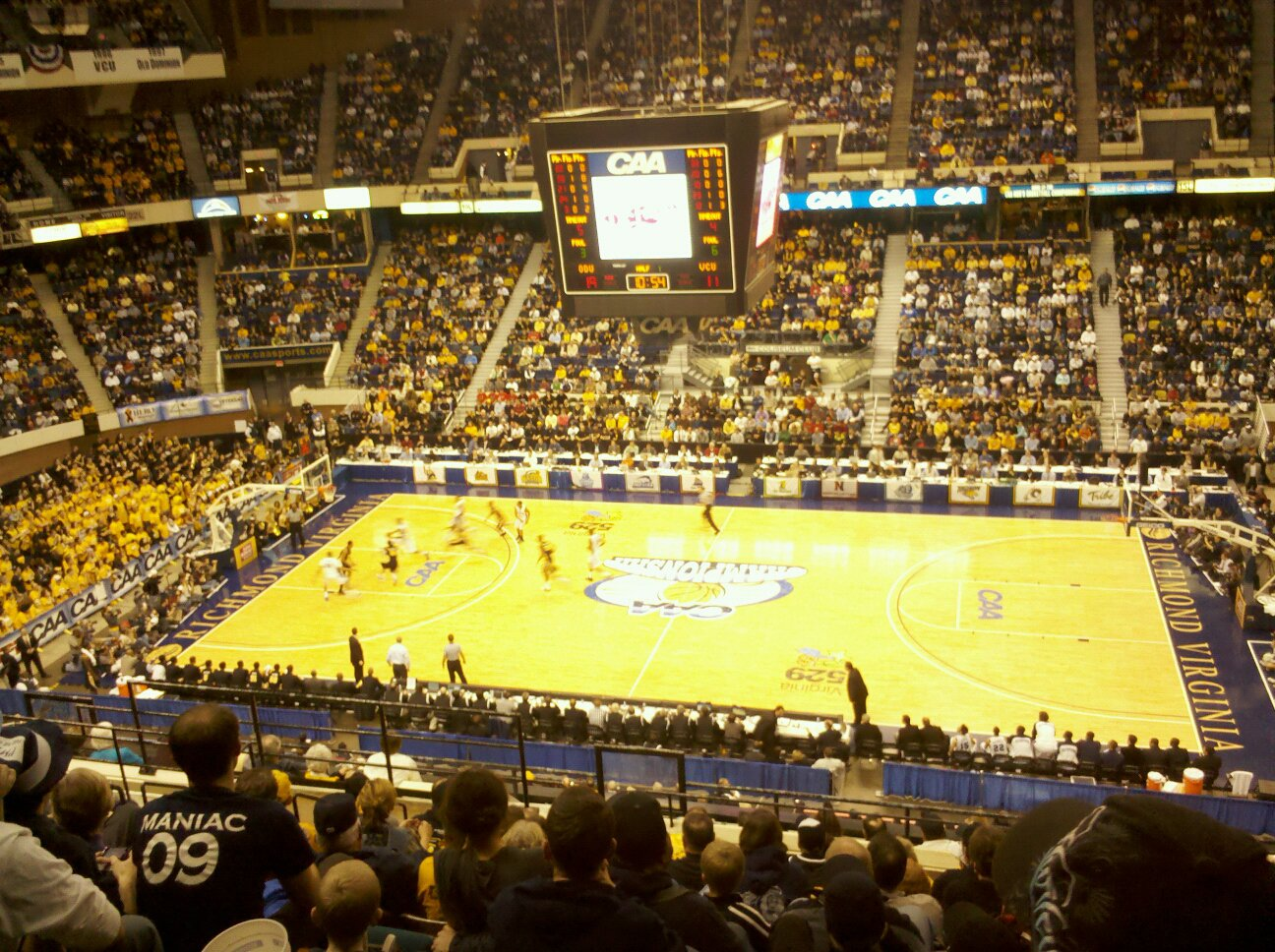
ODU vs VCU in the 2011 CAA Finals

| Year | Round | Opponent | Result |
|---|---|---|---|
| 1980 | First round | UCLA | L 74–87 |
| 1982 | First round | Wake Forest | L 57–74 |
| 1985 | First round | SMU | L 68–85 |
| 1986 | First round Second Round | West Virginia; Duke | W 75–64; L 61–89 |
| 1992 | First round | Kentucky | L 69–88 |
| 1995 | First round Second Round | Villanova; Tulsa | W 89–81 ^{3OT} L 52–65 |
| 1997 | First round | New Mexico | L 55–59 |
| 2005 | First round | Michigan State | L 81–89 |
| 2007 | First round | Butler | L 46–57 |
| 2010 | First round Second Round | Notre Dame; Baylor | W 51–50; L 68–76 |
| 2011 | Second Round | Butler | L 58–60 |
| 2019 | First round | Purdue | L 48–61 |

*Following the introduction of the "First Four" round in 2011, the Round of 64 and Round of 32 were referred to as the second round and third round, respectively, from 2011 to 2015. Then from 2016 moving forward, the Round 64 and Round of 32 were called the First and Second rounds, as they were prior to 2011.

=== NCAA Tournament seeding history ===
The NCAA began seeding the tournament with the 1979 NCAA tournament.

| Years | '80 | '82 | '85 | '86 | '92 | '95 | '97 | '05 | '07 | '10 | '11 | '19 |
|---|---|---|---|---|---|---|---|---|---|---|---|---|
| Seeds | 9 | 10 | 12 | 8 | 15 | 14 | 14 | 12 | 12 | 11 | 9 | 14 |

=== Division II NCAA tournament results ===
The Monarchs have appeared in six NCAA Men's Division II basketball tournaments. Their combined record is 14–7. They were national champions in 1975.

| Year | Round | Opponent | Result |
|---|---|---|---|
| 1969 | Regional Semifinals; Regional Third Place | Oglethorpe; Norfolk State | L 60–68; L 102–113 |
| 1971 | Regional Semifinals; Regional Finals; Elite Eight; Final Four; National Championship Game | Stetson; Norfolk State; Puget Sound; Kentucky Wesleyan; Evansville | W 89–65; W 102–97; W 81–80 ^{OT} W 97–83; L 82–97 |
| 1973 | Regional Semifinals; Regional Finals | Fayetteville State; Roanoke | W 80–74; L 87–88 ^{OT} |
| 1974 | Regional Semifinals; Regional Finals | Rollins; Norfolk State | W 80–77; L 76–89 |
| 1975 | Regional Semifinals; Regional Finals; Elite Eight; Final Four; National Championship Game | Baltimore; Randolph-Macon; North Dakota; Tennessee State; New Orleans | W 95–72; W 83–76; W 78–62; W 77–60; W 76–74 |
| 1976 | Regional Semifinals; Regional Finals; Elite Eight; Final Four; National Third Place | James Madison; Baltimore; Cheyney; Puget Sound; Eastern Illinois | W 86–77; W 73–58; W 90–85; L 78–83; L 74–78 |

=== NIT results ===
The Monarchs have appeared in 11 National Invitation Tournaments. Their combined record is 11–11.

| Year | Round | Opponent | Result |
|---|---|---|---|
| 1977 | First round | Villanova | L 68–71 |
| 1979 | First round Second Round; Quarterfinals | Wagner; Clemson; Purdue | W 83–81; W 61–59; L 59–67 |
| 1981 | First round | Georgia | L 60–74 |
| 1983 | First round | South Carolina | L 90–100 |
| 1984 | First round | Notre Dame | L 62–67 |
| 1988 | First round | Ohio State | L 73–86 |
| 1993 | First round Second Round | VCU; Miami (OH) | W 74–68; L 58–60 |
| 1994 | First round Second Round | Manhattan; Bradley | W 76–74; L 75–79 |
| 1999 | First round Second Round | Seton Hall; Butler | W 75–56; L 68–75 |
| 2006 | First round Second Round; Quarterfinals; Semifinals | Colorado; Manhattan; Hofstra; Michigan | W 79–61; W 70–66; W 61–51; L 43–66 |
| 2015 | First round Second Round; Quarterfinals; Semifinals | Charleston Southern; Illinois State; Murray State; Stanford | W 65–56; W 50–49; W 72–69; L 60–67 |

=== CBI results ===
The Monarchs have appeared in two College Basketball Invitational. Their combined record is 3–2.

| Year | Round | Opponent | Result |
|---|---|---|---|
| 2008 | First round Quarterfinals | Rider; Virginia | W 68–65; L 68–71 |
| 2014 | First round Quarterfinals; Semifinals | South Dakota State; Radford; Fresno State | W 72–65; W 82–59; L 64–71 |

=== CIT results ===
The Monarchs have appeared in two CollegeInsider.com Tournaments. They were champions of the inaugural tournament in 2009. Their combined record is 6–1.

| Year | Round | Opponent | Result |
|---|---|---|---|
| 2009 | First round Quarterfinals; Semifinals; Final | The Citadel; Belmont; James Madison; Bradley | W 67–59; W 70–62; W 81–43; W 66–62 |
| 2012 | First round Second Round; Quarterfinals | Coastal Carolina; USC Upstate; Mercer | W 68–66; W 65–56; L 73–79 |

=== Vegas 16 results ===
The Monarchs appeared in, and won, the first and only Vegas 16. Their record was 3–0.

| Year | Round | Opponent | Result |
|---|---|---|---|
| 2016 | Quarterfinals; Semifinals; Championship game | Tennessee Tech; UC Santa Barbara; Oakland | W 75–59; W 64–49; W 68–67 |

== Chartway Arena ==
Since moving into Chartway Arena in 2002, the Old Dominion men's basketball team has experienced a high winning percentage with an outstanding home court advantage.

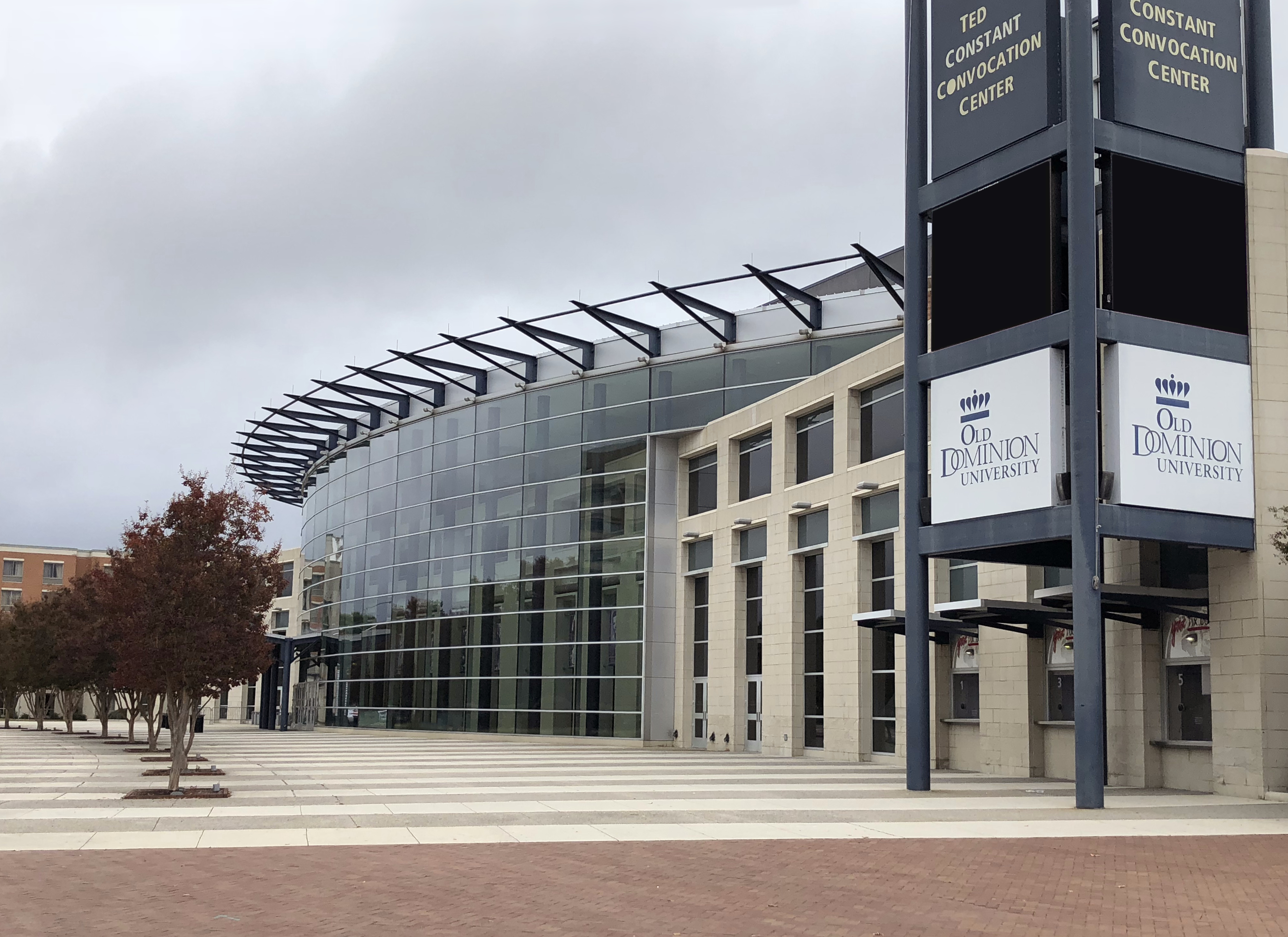
Chartway Arena

| Year | Home Record | Attendance | Average Per Game | National Ranking |
|---|---|---|---|---|
| 2002–03 | 8–6 | 82,742 | 5,910 | #95 |
| 2003–04 | 11–4 | 85,424 | 5,695 | #96 |
| 2004–05 | 14–1 | 90,327 | 6,021 | #91 |
| 2005–06 | 14–1 | 103,725 | 6,915 | #78 |
| 2006–07 | 15–2 | 105,851 | 6,227 | #88 |
| 2007–08 | 13–4 | 114,857 | 6,756 | #82 |
| 2008–09 | 16–3 | 114,911 | 6,048 | #88 |
| 2009–10 | 15–0 | 104,930 | 6,995 | #76 |
| 2010–11 | 14–2 | 123,922 | 7,745 | #66 |
| 2011–12 | 11–6 | 128,563 | 7,142 | #73 |
| 2012–13 | 2–15 | 112,335 | 6,608 | #77 |
| 2013–14 | 12–6 | 104,008 | 5,778 | #92 |
| 2014–15 | 20–0 | 140,072 | 7,004 | #69 |
| 2015–16 | 11–4 | 112,604 | 7,037 | #68 |
| 2016–17 | 11–4 | 98,590 | 6,572 | #81 |
| 2017–18 | 12–2 | 88,851 | 6,346 | #79 |
| 2018–19 | 14–2 | 105,916 | 6,620 | |
| 2019–20 | 10–4 | 83,215 | 5,944 | |
| 2020–21 | 9–1 | 2,500 | 250 | |
| 2021–22 | 10–4 | 69,741 | 4,982 | |
| Overall | 242–71 (.776) | | | |

== Players ==
=== First team All-Americans ===
| Year | Player | Ref. |
|---|---|---|
| 1972 | Dave Twardzik | |
| 1974 | Joel Copeland | |
| 1974–75 | Gray Eubank | |
| 1976 | Wilson Washington | |

=== Academic All-Americans ===
| Year | Player | Mention |
|---|---|---|
| 1974–75 | Gray Eubank | 1st. Team |
| 1976 | Dave Moyer | Honorific Mention |
| 1976 | Reese Neyland | 3rd. Team |
| 1994 | Kevin Larkin | 3rd. Team |
| 2006 | Alex Loughton | 3rd. Team |

=== Lefty Driesell National Defensive Player of the Year ===
| Year | Player |
|---|---|
| 2010 | Kent Bazemore |

=== Retired numbers ===
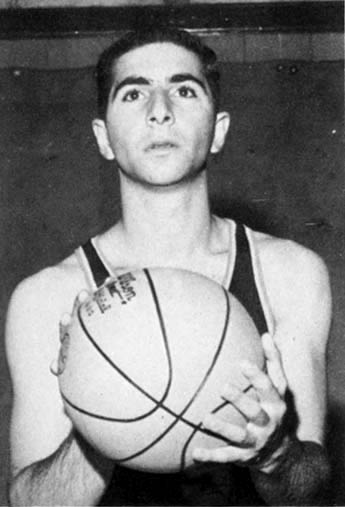
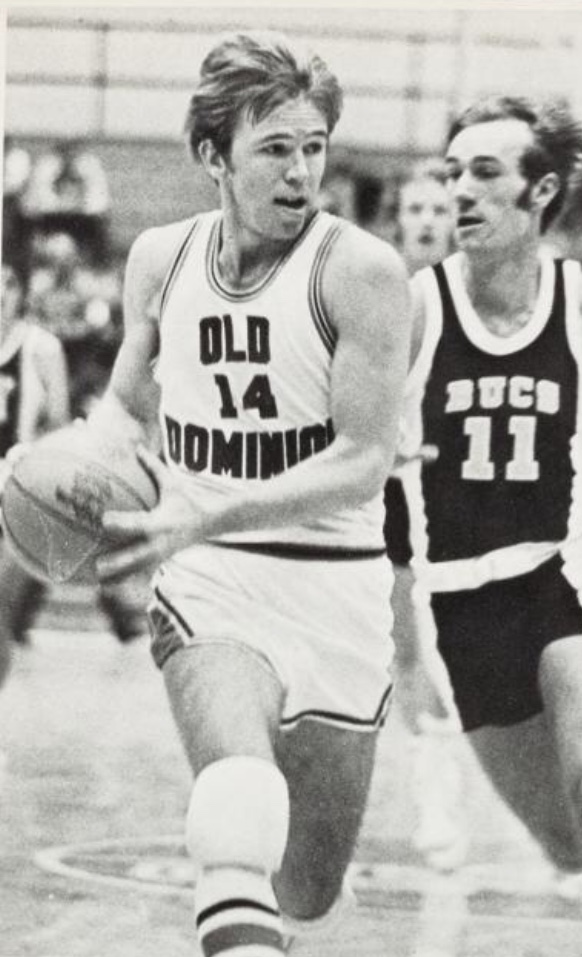
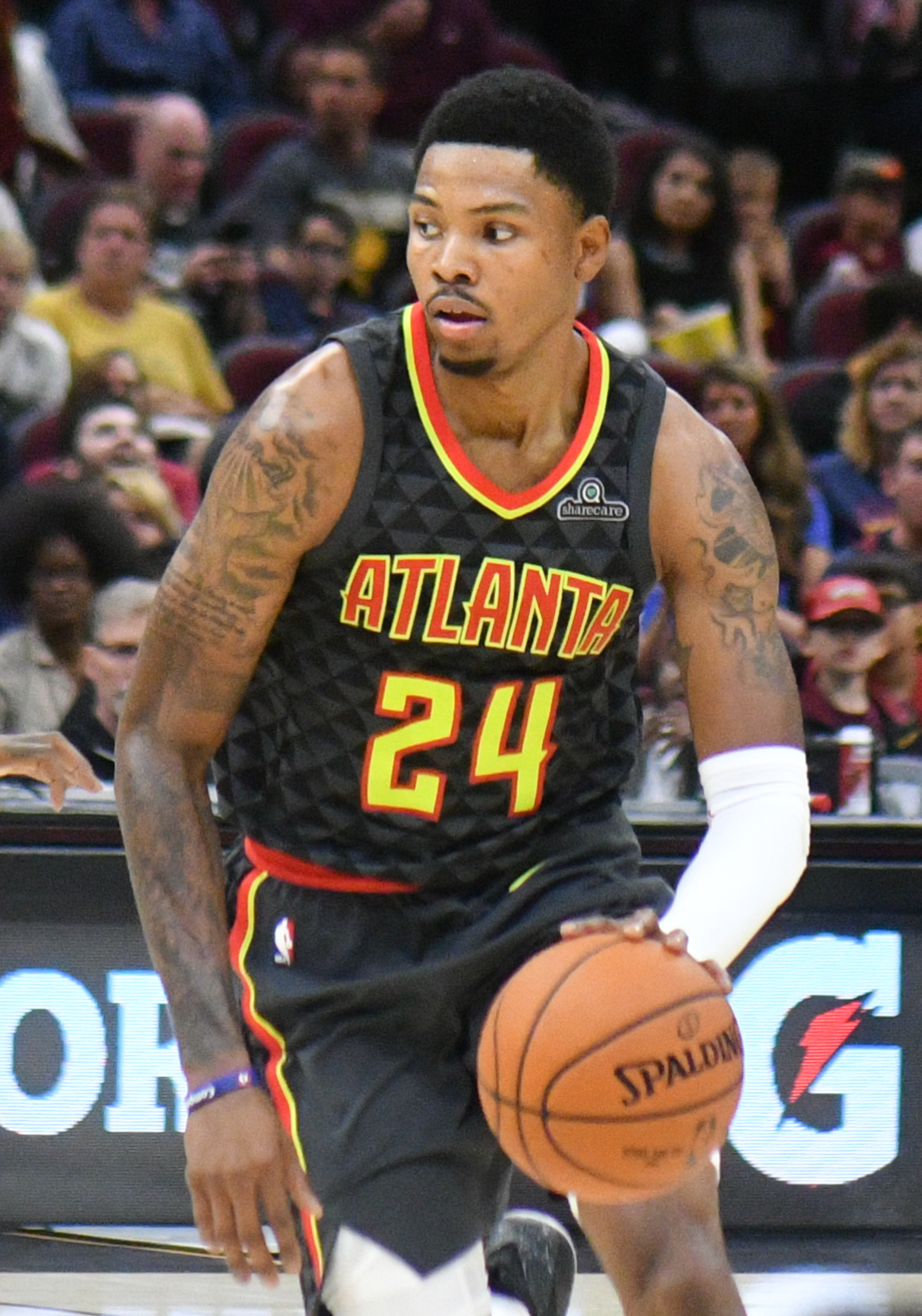
Fltr: Leo Anthony, Dave Twardzik, and Kent Bazemore, whose numbers were retired by the University

Old Dominion Monarchs retired numbers
| No. | Player | Tenure | No. ret. | Ref. |
| 5 | Leo Anthony | 1958–1961 | 1961 | |
| 14 | Dave Twardzik | 1969–1972 | 1972 | |
| 24 | Kent Bazemore | 2008–2012 | 2016 | |
| 32 | Joel Copeland | | 1974 | |
| 33 | Odell Hodge | 1992–1997 | 2010 | |
| 44 | Kenny Gattison | 1982–1986 | 1992 | |
| 45 | Mark West | 1979–1983 | 1984 | |
| 52 | Wilson Washington | 1974–1977 | 1978 | |

=== Old Dominion University Hall of Fame members ===
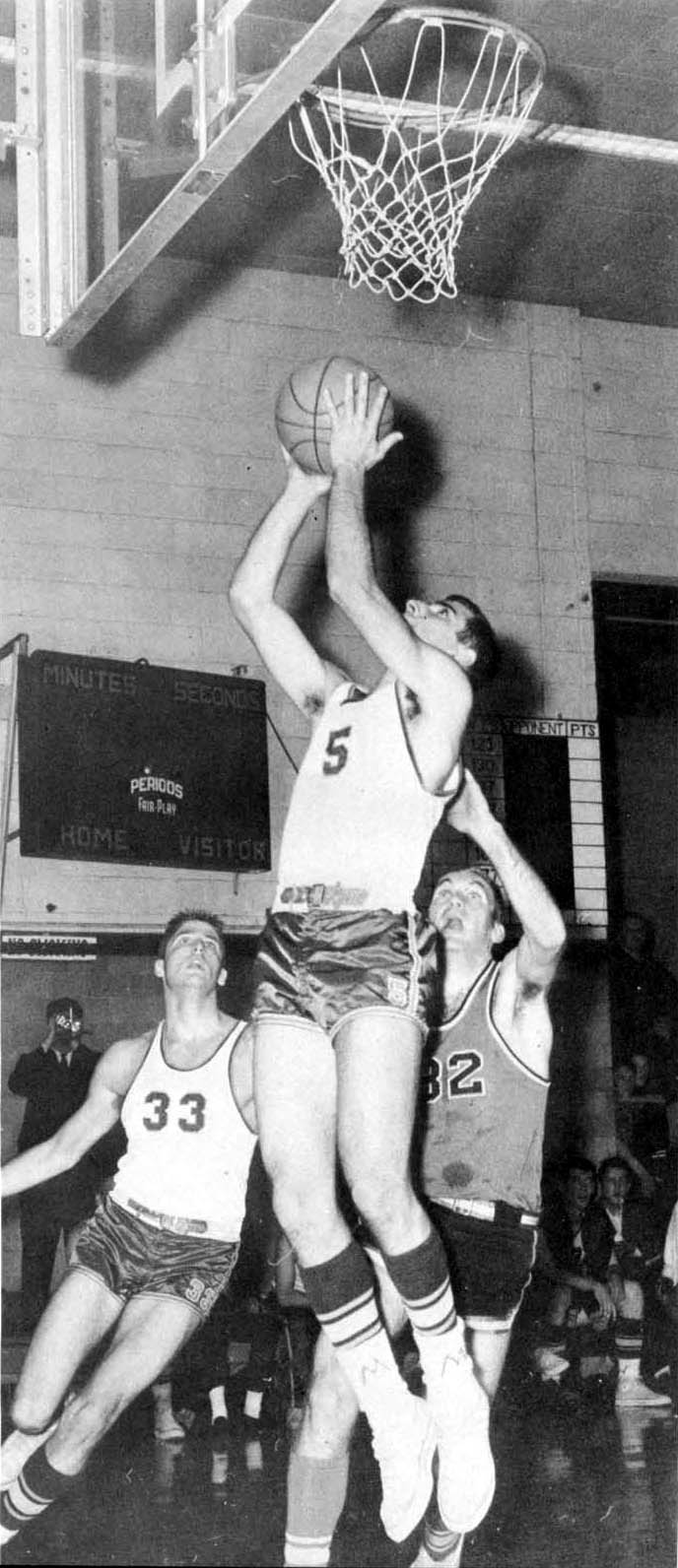
OD Hall of Famer Leo Anthony (#5) in a game c. 1961

Monarch Men's Basketball; Hall of Fame
| 1980 | Leo Anthony |
| 1980 | Tommy Scott (Coach) |
| 1980 | Rufus Tonelson |
| 1981 | Sonny Allen (Coach) |
| 1981 | Dave Twardzik |
| 1982 | Joel Copeland |
| 1982 | Fred Edmonds |
| 1982 | Harry Lozon |
| 1983 | Bud Metheny (Coach) |
| 1983 | Button Speakes |
| 1983 | Wilson Washington |
| 1984 | Dick St. Clair |
| 1985 | Tony Zontini |
| 1986 | Woody Barnes |
| 1986 | Randy Leddy |
| 1987 | Kirkie Harrison |
| 1987 | Everett Tolson |
| 1988 | Jack Harris |
| 1988 | Oliver Purnell |
| 1988 | Mark West |
| 2008 | Bob Pritchett |

=== Old Dominion players in the NBA ===
10 former Old Dominion players have gone on to play in the NBA.

- Kent Bazemore (2012–2022)
- Cal Bowdler (1999–2002)
- Ahmad Caver (2022)
- Mark Davis (1988–1989)
- Chris Gatling (1991–02; 1997 All-Star)
- Kenny Gattison (1986–1996)
- Dave Twardzik (1972–76 ABA, 1976–80 NBA) – 1977 NBA Champion & #13 retired with Portland
- Ronnie Valentine (1980–1981)
- Wilson Washington (1977–1979)
- Mark West (1983–2000)
