= Mike Jones (basketball, born 1973) =

American basketball player and coach

Current position
- Title: Head coach
- Team: Old Dominion
- Conference: Sun Belt
- Record: 32–42 (.432)

Biographical details
- Born: October 16, 1973 (age 53)

Playing career
- 1991–1995: Old Dominion

Coaching career (HC unless noted)
- 1999–2002: DeMatha Catholic (assistant)
- 2002–2021: DeMatha Catholic
- 2004–2021: USA Basketball (various)
- 2021–2023: Virginia Tech (associate)
- 2023–2024: Maryland (assistant)
- 2024–present: Old Dominion

Head coaching record
- Overall: 32–42 (.432)

Accomplishments and honors

Championships
- 8 WCAC tournament

Michael K. Jones (born October 16, 1973) is an American college basketball coach, currently serving as head coach for the Old Dominion Monarchs men's basketball team. Prior to Old Dominion, Jones served as an assistant coach for the Maryland Terrapins and associate head coach for the Virginia Tech Hokies following 19 seasons as head coach at DeMatha Catholic High School.

== Playing career ==
Jones played high school basketball at DeMatha before graduating and enrolling at Old Dominion University. Jones played at ODU from 1991–95 and earned All-CAA honors as a senior. Jones scored 19 points in ODU's triple overtime upset win over No. 3 seed Villanova in the first round of the 1995 NCAA Tournament. Jones' 168 career three-pointers are sixth most in Monarch history. He scored 1,166 career points in 111 games played.

After graduating from ODU, Jones played professionally in Portugal, Hong Kong, Finland and the Dominican Republic.

== Coaching career ==
Jones broke into coaching when he joined hall of fame coach Morgan Wootten's staff at DeMatha in 1999. He replaced Wootten as Head Coach in 2002. Jones led the Stags to nine Washington Catholic Athletic Conference regular-season championships, eight WCAC tournament championships and a national championship in 2006 while compiling a 511–119 record. Jones coached at least 6 future NBA players at DeMatha, including Markelle Fultz and Jerian Grant. DeMatha named their court in honor of Jones in 2023.

While at DeMatha, Jones also worked extensively with USA Basketball serving on the coaching staff of 22 various national teams including leading the US U16 national team to a gold medal at the 2019 FIBA Americas U16 championships.

Jones left DeMatha in 2021 to take role as the associate head coach for Virginia Tech under Mike Young. Young valued Jones' ability to recruit the D.C. area. After two seasons, Jones left Virginia Tech to become an assistant coach for Kevin Willard's staff at the University of Maryland. After one season at Maryland, Jones was hired as Head Coach at his alma mater, Old Dominion.

== Head coaching record ==
Record table
Season	Team	Overall	Conference	Standing	Postseason
Old Dominion Monarchs (Sun Belt Conference) (2024–present)
2024–25	Old Dominion	15–20	8–10	T–8th	
2025–26	Old Dominion	12–21	7–11	T–11th	
2026–27	Old Dominion	5–1	0–0		
Old Dominion:		32–42 (.432)	15–21 (.417)		
Total:		32–42 (.432)			
