= List of Kentucky Wildcats men's basketball players =

This is a list of Kentucky Wildcats basketball players who have attained notability through their performance in the sport of basketball and other endeavors. The list includes over 150 current and former players. The list is presented in alphabetical order but is sortable by the years and positions at which they played.

== List of current and former players ==
Name	Position	Hometown	First season	Last season	Notes
Chuck Aleksinas	Center	Litchfield, Connecticut	1978	1979	Member of the 1978 National Championship team. Transferred after his sophomore season to Connecticut.
Shagari Alleyne	Center	Bronx, New York	2004	2006	Tallest player in the history of Kentucky basketball (7'3").
Derek Anderson	Guard	Louisville, Kentucky	1996	1997	Member of the 1996 National Championship team. Transferred to Kentucky from Ohio State.
Dwight Anderson	Guard	Dayton, Ohio	1979	1980	Nicknamed the Blur. Transferred after his sophomore season to Southern Cal.
Kelenna Azubuike	Forward	Tulsa, Oklahoma	2003	2005	Entered the NBA Draft after his junior season.
Scotty Baesler	Guard	Lexington, Kentucky	1961	1963	Former U.S. Congressman, Kentucky 6th District (D).
Antwain Barbour	Guard	Elizabethtown, Kentucky	2003	2004	
Cliff Barker	Guard	Yorktown, Indiana	1947	1949	Member of the 1948 and the 1949 National Championship teams. Was an All-SEC guard in 1948 and 1949. His jersey hangs in the rafters of Rupp Arena.
Dale Barnstable	Guard	Antioch, Illinois	1947	1950	Member of the 1948 and the 1949 National Championship teams.
Ralph Beard	Guard	Louisville, Kentucky	1946	1949	Three time consensus First team All-American. Member of the 1948 and the 1949 National Championship teams. One of Rupp's Fabulous Five. His jersey hangs in the rafters of Rupp Arena.
Winston Bennett	Forward	Louisville, Kentucky	1984	1988	Was an All-SEC forward. Was Kentucky Mr. Basketball his senior season in high school. Former head coach of Kentucky State.
Jerry Bird	Forward	Corbin, Kentucky	1954	1956	His jersey hangs in the rafters of Rupp Arena.
James Blackmon	Guard	Marion, Indiana	1984	1987	
Eric Bledsoe	Guard	Birmingham, Alabama	2010	2010	An All-SEC Freshman in 2010. Declared for the NBA Draft after his freshman season.
Keith Bogans	Guard	Alexandria, Virginia	2000	2003	Was the 2003 SEC Player of the Year. Was a consensus second team All-American in 2003. He is #4 on Kentucky's scoring list.
Devin Booker	Guard	Moss Point, Mississippi	2015	2015	An All-SEC guard in 2015. Declared for the NBA Draft after his freshman season.
Sam Bowie	Center	Lebanon, Pennsylvania	1980	1984	Was a consensus second team All-American in 1983. His #31 jersey hangs in the rafters of Rupp Arena. Was the #2 overall pick in the 1984 NBA draft.
Michael Bradley	Forward	Worcester, Massachusetts	1998	1999	Member of the 1998 National Championship team. Transferred after his sophomore season to Villanova.
Ramel Bradley	Guard	New York, New York	2005	2008	Nicknamed Smooth. Averaged 20 points per game his senior season.
Bob Brannum	Center	Winfield, Kansas	1943	1944	Was a consensus first team All-American in 1944. Served in World War II. Transferred after his sophomore season to Michigan State.
Al Bruno	Center	West Chester, Pennsylvania	1949	1949	Member of the 1949 National Championship team. Also a three-sport athlete at Kentucky playing football and track with basketball.
Bob Burrow	Forward	Wells, Texas	1955	1956	Was a consensus second team All-American in 1956. His #50 jersey hangs in the rafters of Rupp Arena.
Dwane Casey	Guard	Morganfield, Kentucky	1976	1979	Member of the 1978 National Championship team. Current Head Coach of the Toronto Raptors.
Mike Casey	Guard	Shelbyville, Kentucky	1969	1971	Three-time First team All-SEC. Missed the 1970 season with a broken leg.
Willie Cauley-Stein	Center	Olathe, Kansas	2013	2015	Was a consensus first team All-American in 2015. Was the 2015 NABC Defensive Player of the Year. Declared for the NBA Draft after his junior season.
Rex Chapman	Guard	Owensboro, Kentucky	1987	1988	Nicknamed King Rex. Was First team All-SEC both of his two seasons. Declared for the NBA Draft after his sophomore season.
Larry Conley	Guard	Ashland, Kentucky	1964	1966	One of Rupp's Runts. A three-time All-SEC player. Current College Basketball TV broadcaster with Fox Sports.
Jimmy Dan Conner	Guard	Lawrenceburg, Kentucky	1973	1975	Was an All-SEC player in 1973.
DeMarcus Cousins	Center	Mobile, Alabama	2010	2010	Was a consensus second team All-American in 2010. Was the 2010 SEC Freshman of the Year. Declared for the NBA Draft after his freshman season.
Johnny Cox	Guard	Hazard, Kentucky	1956	1959	Member of the 1958 National Championship team. Was a consensus first team All-American in 1958. His #24 jersey hangs in the rafters of Rupp Arena.
Joe Crawford	Guard	Detroit, Michigan	2005	2008	
Louie Dampier	Guard	Indianapolis, Indiana	1965	1967	Was a two-time consensus second team All-American in 1966 and 1967. Was a member of Rupp's Runts. Played 12 seasons in the ABA and NBA with the Kentucky Colonels and San Antonio Spurs; named to the ABA All-Time Team in 1997; inducted as a player to the Naismith Memorial Basketball Hall of Fame in 2015.
Erik Daniels	Forward	Cincinnati, Ohio	2001	2004	
Dan Issel	Forward	Batavia, Illinois	1968	1970	The Wildcats' all-time leading men's scorer and a two-time consensus All-American in 1969 (second team) and 1970 (first team). Played 15 seasons in the ABA and NBA with the Kentucky Colonels and Denver Nuggets; named to the ABA All-Time Team in 1997; inducted as a player to the Naismith Memorial Basketball Hall of Fame in 1993. Also coached the Nuggets in six seasons during two stints.
Jamal Mashburn	Forward	The Bronx, New York	1990	1993	Consensus first-team All-American (1993) and SEC Player of the Year (1993)
Julius Randle	Forward	Dallas, Texas	2014	2014	Entered into 2014 NBA draft after his freshman season.
Pat Riley	Forward	Schenectady, New York	1965	1967	Member of Rupp's Runts who played nine seasons in the NBA, winning an NBA title with the 1971–72 Los Angeles Lakers. Went on to greater fame as a coach, winning four NBA titles with the Lakers and one with the Miami Heat; named one of the Top 10 Coaches in NBA History in 1996 and inducted to the Hall of Fame as a coach in 2008.
Aminu Timberlake	Forward	Chicago, Illinois	1992	1995	
Jack Tingle	Guard	Bedford, Kentucky	1944	1947	
Karl-Anthony Towns	Forward	Metuchen, New Jersey	2015	2015	Was a consensus second team All-American in 2015. The #1 overall pick in the 2015 NBA draft, the second in UK history. Unanimous selection as NBA Rookie of the Year in 2016.
Lou Tsioropoulos	Guard	Lynn, Massachusetts	1950	1953	1951 National Championship team. His #16 jersey hangs in the rafters of Rupp Arena.
Wayne Turner	Guard	Boston, Massachusetts	1996	1999	Member 1996 and 1998 National Championship teams.
Melvin Turpin	Center	Lexington, Kentucky	1981	1984	Was a consensus second team All-American in 1984.
Tyler Ulis	Guard	Lima, Ohio	2014	2016	
Eloy Vargas	Forward	Moca, Dominican Republic	2011	2012	Member of the 2012 National Championship team.
Antoine Walker	Forward	Chicago, Illinois	1995	1996	Member of the 1996 National Championship team. Was a first team All-SEC in 1996.
Kenny Walker	Forward	Roberta, Georgia	1983	1986	Was the 1985 and 1986 SEC Player of the Year. Was a consensus first team All-American in 1986.
Bobby Watson	Forward	Owensboro, Kentucky	1949	1952	Member of the 1949 and the 1951 National Championship teams.
John Wall	Guard	Raleigh, North Carolina	2010	2010	Was a consensus first team All-American in 2010. The #1 overall pick in the 2010 NBA draft, the first in UK history.
Kyle Wiltjer	Forward	Portland, Oregon	2012	2013	Member of the 2012 National Championship team. Transferred to Gonzaga after sophomore season.
Sean Woods	Guard	Indianapolis, Indiana	1989	1992	Was a member of the Unforgettables. Former head coach at Morehead State.
James Young	Guard	Rochester, Michigan	2014	2014	Entered into 2014 NBA draft after his freshman season.
