= Aminu Timberlake =

American basketball player (born 1973)

Personal information
- Born: 1973 (age 52–53) Chicago, Illinois, U.S.
- Listed height: 6 ft 10 in (2.08 m)

Career information
- High school: De La Salle (Chicago, Illinois)
- College: Kentucky (1991–1993); Southern Illinois (1994–1996)
- NBA draft: 1996: undrafted
- Playing career: 1996–1999
- Position: Forward

Aminu Timberlake (born 1973) is an American former basketball player who played in the NCAA with Kentucky Wildcats as a freshman, after having played in De LaSalle in his high school years.

After Kentucky, the 6'10" forward transferred in his sophomore year to Southern Illinois University. Upon graduation in 1995, Timberlake played professionally overseas for five years, in National Basketball leagues in Australia, New Zealand, China and in his final season 1998-1999 in the South Korea Basketball League in the LG Sakers before retiring from professional basketball.

== In popular culture ==
Timberlake is famous for being stomped on by Duke star player Christian Laettner, in one of the most memorable NCAA basketball games of all-time, between the Kentucky Wildcats and the Duke Blue Devils in the 1992 Elite Eight. Officials declined to eject Laettner, instead only charging him with a technical foul, a decision especially controversial because Laettner went on to score 30 points, did not miss a shot during the entire game, and hit the game-winning basket with an overtime buzzer-beating shot in which Grant Hill threw a 75-foot (23 m) inbounds pass to Laettner, who converted it from the free throw line.

After many years of speculation about whether the stomping incident was an accident or an intentional foul, Laettner admitted during the airing of 30 for 30 documentary titled I Hate Christian Laettner broadcast in March 2015 on ESPN, that it was intentional. During the program, Laettner gave his reason for doing it, citing physical play by Timberlake particularly the latter's earlier fouls on him during the game. The former Duke center star also apologized to Timberlake over the incident.

== Personal life ==
Timberlake is a devout Christian. He met his wife while both were studying in Southern Illinois University. He went on a mission trip to Zimbabwe, which helped strengthened his Christian faith. The couple has three girls. Timberlake remains a devout Christian today and is very active in North Atlanta Church of Christ where he also serves in a mentorship program of the church called Trail Guides.

After retiring from international basketball, Timberlake went on to work as a telecommunications executive in the Atlanta, Georgia. Besides his new professional career, he still finds time to coach youth basketball.
