= 1991–92 Alabama Crimson Tide men's basketball team =

American college basketball season

1991–92 Alabama Crimson Tide men's basketball

NCAA tournament, Second round
- Conference: Southeastern Conference

Ranking
- Coaches: No. 12
- AP: No. 13
- Record: 26–9 (10–6, 3rd in Southeastern Conference Western Division SEC)
- Head coach: Wimp Sanderson (12th season)
- Home arena: Coleman Coliseum

1991–92 Southeastern Conference men's basketball standings
	Conf.				Overall
Team	W		L	PCT	W		L	PCT
East
No. 6 Kentucky †	12	–	4	.750	29	–	7	.806
Florida	9	–	7	.563	19	–	14	.576
Tennessee	8	–	8	.500	19	–	15	.559
Georgia	7	–	9	.438	15	–	14	.517
Vanderbilt	6	–	10	.375	15	–	15	.500
South Carolina	3	–	13	.188	11	–	17	.393
West
No. 9 Arkansas	13	–	3	.813	26	–	8	.765
No. 25 LSU	12	–	4	.750	21	–	10	.677
No. 13 Alabama	10	–	6	.625	26	–	9	.743
Mississippi State	7	–	9	.438	15	–	13	.536
Auburn	5	–	11	.313	12	–	15	.444
Ole Miss	4	–	12	.250	11	–	17	.393
† 1992 SEC tournament winner Rankings from AP Poll

The 1991–92 Alabama Crimson Tide men's basketball team represented the University of Alabama in the 1991–92 NCAA Division I men's basketball season. The team's head coach was Wimp Sanderson, who was in his 12th season at Alabama. The team played their home games at Coleman Coliseum in Tuscaloosa, Alabama. They finished the season with a record of 26–9. The team's conference record was 10–6, which was good enough for third place in the SEC Western Division, third behind new SEC member Arkansas and LSU. This was the first season of divisional play in the SEC, due to the addition of new teams Arkansas and South Carolina.

Forward Melvin Cheatum and guard Gary Waites both graduated, and the Tide's freshman signees were center Cedric Moore, forwards Jason Caffey and Andre Perry, and guards Dennis Miller and Elliot Washington. These players joined a solid core of Robert Horry, Latrell Sprewell, and James "Hollywood" Robinson.

This was coach Wimp Sanderson's final season as coach of the Crimson Tide. Sanderson resigned amid sexual assault allegations from his former secretary.

The Tide advanced all the way to the 1992 SEC men's basketball tournament final, their fourth straight, but lost in the final to Kentucky. The Tide received an at-large bid to the 1992 NCAA tournament and defeated Stanford in the first round, but lost to North Carolina in the second round.

== Roster ==
1991–92 Alabama Crimson Tide men's basketball team
Players
Coaches

Pos.	#	Name	Height	Weight	Year	Previous school	Hometown
G	4	Kenneth Rice	6 ft 4 in (1.93 m)	—	Jr	Austin High	Decatur, Alabama
G	12	Elliot Washington	6 ft 0 in (1.83 m)	—	Fr	Southeast High School	Bradenton, Florida
G	13	Philip Pearson	6 ft 2 in (1.88 m)	—	So	Jeff Davis High School	Montgomery, Alabama
G	20	Jeff Lovell	5 ft 11 in (1.8 m)	—	Jr
F	21	Andre Perry	6 ft 6 in (1.98 m)	—	Fr
G	23	Darby Rich	6 ft 5 in (1.96 m)	—	Sr
G	24	Dennis Miller	6 ft 2 in (1.88 m)	—	Fr
F	25	Robert Horry	6 ft 9 in (2.06 m)	—	Sr	Andalusia (AL) High School	Harford County, Maryland
G	31	James Robinson	6 ft 2 in (1.88 m)	—	So	Murrah High School	Jackson, Mississippi
F	35	Jason Caffey	6 ft 8 in (2.03 m)	—	Fr	Davidson High School	Mobile, Alabama
G	42	Latrell Sprewell	6 ft 5 in (1.96 m)	—	Sr	Three Rivers CC, Missouri	Milwaukee, Wisconsin
C	51	Cedric Moore	6 ft 9 in (2.06 m)	—	Fr	Woodlawn High School	Birmingham, Alabama

Head coach

- Wimp Sanderson

Assistant coach(es)

Legend

- (C) Team captain
- (S) Suspended
- (I) Ineligible
- (W) Walk-on
- Injured
- Current redshirt

== Schedule and results ==
Date time, TV	Rank^{#}	Opponent^{#}	Result	Record	Site city, state
Regular Season
November 23, 1991*	No. 17	at Davidson	W 76–59	1–0	Belk Arena; Davidson, North Carolina
November 27, 1991*	No. 16	Tennessee Tech	W 105–85	2–0	Coleman Coliseum; Tuscaloosa, Alabama
December 1, 1991*	No. 16	Virginia	W 80–69	3–0	Coleman Coliseum; Tuscaloosa, Alabama
December 3, 1991*	No. 15	Chattanooga	W 76–61	4–0	Coleman Coliseum; Tuscaloosa, Alabama
December 6, 1991*	No. 15	NC State	W 77–66	5–0	Charlotte Coliseum; Charlotte, North Carolina
December 7, 1991*	No. 15	at Charlotte	L 74–79	5–1	Charlotte Coliseum; Charlotte, North Carolina
December 14, 1991*	No. 20	Old Dominion	W 105–67	6–1	Coleman Coliseum; Tuscaloosa, Alabama
December 18, 1991*	No. 20	The Citadel	W 107–67	7–1	Coleman Coliseum; Tuscaloosa, Alabama
December 21, 1991*	No. 20	Southern Miss	W 87–64	8–1	
December 28, 1991*	No. 20	Bradley	W 71–62	9–1	Neal S. Blaisdell Center; Honolulu, Hawaii
December 29, 1991*	No. 20	Villanova	W 78–76	10–1	Neal S. Blaisdell Center; Honolulu, Hawaii
December 30, 1991*	No. 19	Washington State	W 71–68	11–1	Neal S. Blaisdell Center; Honolulu, Hawaii
January 4, 1992	No. 19	at Mississippi State	W 78–64	12–1 (1–0)	Humphrey Coliseum; Starkville, Mississippi
January 8, 1992	No. 16	No. 13 Arkansas	W 65–63	13–1 (2–0)	Coleman Coliseum; Tuscaloosa, Alabama
January 11, 1992*	No. 16	Northeastern Illinois	W 82–56	14–1 (3–0)	Coleman Coliseum; Tuscaloosa, Alabama
January 14, 1992	No. 9	LSU	L 81–89	14–2 (3–1)	Coleman Coliseum; Tuscaloosa, Alabama
January 18, 1992	No. 9	at Auburn	L 63–81	14–3 (3–2)	Memorial Coliseum; Auburn, Alabama
January 22, 1992	No. 15	Ole Miss	L 77–78	14–4 (3–3)	Coleman Coliseum; Tuscaloosa, Alabama
January 25, 1992	No. 15	at Georgia	W 68–65	15–4 (4–3)	Stegeman Coliseum; Athens, Georgia
January 28, 1992	No. 22	at South Carolina	W 83–81	16–4 (5–3)	Carolina Coliseum; Columbia, South Carolina
February 1, 1992	No. 22	Florida	W 68–56	17–4 (6–3)	Coleman Coliseum; Tuscaloosa, Alabama
February 5, 1992*	No. 18	at Texas A&M	W 74–61	18–4	G. Rollie White Coliseum; College Station, Texas
February 8, 1992	No. 18	Tennessee	W 85–68	19–4 (7–3)	Coleman Coliseum; Tuscaloosa, Alabama
February 12, 1992	No. 16	at No. 19 Kentucky	L 83–107	19–5 (7–4)	Rupp Arena; Lexington, Kentucky
February 19, 1992	No. 14	Vanderbilt	W 85–64	20–5 (8–4)	Coleman Coliseum; Tuscaloosa, Alabama
February 22, 1992	No. 14	at No. 10 Arkansas	L 87–90	20–6 (8–5)	Barnhill Arena; Fayetteville, Arkansas
February 26, 1992	No. 16	Mississippi State	W 79–69	21–6 (9–5)	Coleman Coliseum; Tuscaloosa, Alabama
February 29, 1992	No. 16	LSU	L 65–73	21–7 (9–6)	Coleman Coliseum; Tuscaloosa, Alabama
March 4, 1992	No. 20	at Ole Miss	W 84–83	22–7 (10–6)	Tad Smith Coliseum; Oxford, Mississippi
March 7, 1992	No. 20	Auburn	W 82–80	23–7 (11–6)	Coleman Coliseum; Tuscaloosa, Alabama
SEC Tournament
March 13, 1992	(4) No. 17	(5) Florida; Second Round	W 62–60	24–7	Birmingham-Jefferson Civic Center; Birmingham, Alabama
March 14, 1992	(4) No. 17	(1) No. 6 Arkansas; Semifinals	W 90–89	25–7	Birmingham-Jefferson Civic Center; Birmingham, Alabama
March 15, 1992	(4) No. 17	(2) No. 9 Kentucky; SEC Championship	L 54–80	25–8	Birmingham-Jefferson Civic Center; Birmingham, Alabama
NCAA Tournament
March 19, 1992*	(5 SE) No. 13	(12 SE) Stanford; First Round	W 80–75	26–8	Riverfront Coliseum; Cincinnati, Ohio
March 21, 1992*	(5 SE) No. 13	(4 SE) No. 18 North Carolina; Second Round	L 55–64	26–9	Riverfront Coliseum; Cincinnati, Ohio
*Non-conference game. ^{#}Rankings from AP poll. (#) Tournament seedings in parentheses. SE=Southeast.
