= Rory Karpf =

American filmmaker

Rory Karpf is an American filmmaker specializing in sports related themes. He has won four Emmy's and a Peabody Award for his work.

In 2007, Karpf directed Dale, a theatrical film on the life of NASCAR driver Dale Earnhardt. When it premiered on the cable network CMT, it was the highest rated program in the network's history. It is also believed to be the highest selling sports DVD of all time.

He continued his relationship with ESPN directing more films for the network. In 2011, Karpf directed Wendell Scott: A Race Story and Herschel, the only authorized film on Heisman trophy winning football player Herschel Walker. He followed that up with Lolo, a documentary on Olympic track athlete Lolo Jones. Karpf was granted exclusive access to Jones and was able to uncover material never before seen on the athlete. Also in 2011, Rory wrote and directed the short film Marbles, an official selection in the Los Angeles Short Film Festival.

In 2012, Rory directed a film about a tornado that hit Atlanta in 2008. and its effect on the 2008 Southeastern Conference men's basketball tournament.

IN 2013, Rory worked on another ESPN films documentary SEC Storied: The Book of Manning that explores the personal and professional life of former NFL and Ole Miss quarterback Archie Manning and how the sudden loss of his father impacted his life and the way he and his wife Olivia Manning raised their three sons.

In 2017 Rory executive produced the television series Secret History of Comics. The Walking Dead comic book creator Robert Kirkman stars in this documentary series that takes a deeper look into the stories, people and events that have transformed the world of comic books.

In 2019 Rory wrote and directed Secrets in the Sky: The Untold Story of Skunk Works on the History Channel. The documentary pulls back the veil of secrecy on Lockheed Martin's enigmatic Skunk Works program.

In 2020 Rory completed work on Shaq Life for TNT, that followed the daily life of Shaquille O'Neal. His roles on the series included executive producer and showrunner.

ESPN 30 for 30 series

After the success of Dale, Karpf went on to direct the racing related films The Ride of Their Lives, Together and Tim Richmond: To the Limit, which was part of ESPN's 30 for 30 series. Karpf was praised for directing "one of only a few films in the series that tells its story with a clarity that we didn't have when the events occurred."

In 2015, Karpf directed for ESPN's 30 for 30 series, I Hate Christian Laettner, that explores Duke's history during the 90's and what motivated people to dislike Christian Laettner

Rory followed up with another 30 for 30 project, Nature Boy in 2018 where he directed the documentary film about professional wrestler Ric Flair. The documentary includes two candid interview sessions with Flair 16 months apart.

Work with Snoop Dogg

In 2015, Rory was Executive Producer on the popular series, Snoop & Son: A Dad's Dream, featuring pop culture icon Snoop Dogg and his son Cordell.

In between ESPN films, Rory directed both seasons of Coach Snoop. The series about Snoop Dogg, follows the rapper as he works with members of a youth football program. The first season aired in 2016 on AOL and season 2 aired on Netflix.

UFC

Since 2015, Rory has been producing for the UFC the series Lookin' for a fight. The series follows Dana White and other professional wrestlers searching for new talent to join the UFC.

In 2019 Rory executive produced UFC 25 Years in Short on YouTube The compilation of short films, which were created in celebration of UFC's silver anniversary in 2018, present 25 captivating UFC stories, one for each year of the promotion's existence.
