= 1991–92 Georgia Tech Yellow Jackets men's basketball team =

American college basketball season

1991–92 Georgia Tech Yellow Jackets men's basketball

NCAA tournament, Sweet Sixteen
- Conference: Atlantic Coast Conference
- Record: 23–12 (8–8 ACC)
- Head coach: Bobby Cremins (11th season)
- Assistant coaches: Kevin Cantwell (6th season); Sherman Dillard (4th season); Jimmy Hebron (11th season)
- Home arena: Alexander Memorial Coliseum

1991–92 ACC men's basketball standings
	Conf.				Overall
Team	W		L	PCT	W		L	PCT
No. 1 Duke †	14	–	2	.875	34	–	2	.944
No. 20 Florida State	11	–	5	.688	22	–	10	.688
No. 18 North Carolina	9	–	7	.563	23	–	10	.697
Georgia Tech	8	–	8	.500	23	–	12	.657
Virginia	8	–	8	.500	20	–	13	.606
Wake Forest	7	–	9	.438	17	–	12	.586
NC State	6	–	10	.375	12	–	18	.400
Maryland	5	–	11	.313	14	–	15	.483
Clemson	4	–	12	.250	14	–	14	.500
† 1992 ACC tournament winner Rankings from AP Poll

The 1991–92 Georgia Tech Yellow Jackets men's basketball team represented the Georgia Institute of Technology as a member of the Atlantic Coast Conference during the 1991–92 NCAA men's basketball season. Led by 11th year head coach Bobby Cremins, the Yellow Jackets reached the Sweet Sixteen of the NCAA tournament.

== Roster ==
1991–92 Georgia Tech Yellow Jackets men's basketball team
Players
Coaches

Pos.	#	Name	Height	Weight	Year	Hometown
G	34	Rod Balanis	6 ft 3 in (1.91 m)	192 lb (87 kg)	So	Williamsburg, Virginia
F	15	Darryl Barnes	6 ft 8 in (2.03 m)	202 lb (92 kg)	Jr	Brooklyn, New York
G	14	Jon Barry	6 ft 4 in (1.93 m)	190 lb (86 kg)	Sr	Oakland, California
G	3	Travis Best	5 ft 11 in (1.8 m)	175 lb (79 kg)	Fr	Springfield, Massachusetts
G	23	Brian Black	6 ft 1 in (1.85 m)	178 lb (81 kg)	So	Marietta, Georgia
PF	34	James Forrest	6 ft 8 in (2.03 m)	235 lb (107 kg)	Fr	Atlanta, Georgia
G	10	James Gaddy	6 ft 3 in (1.91 m)	178 lb (81 kg)	Jr	Macon, Georgia
C	52	Matt Geiger	7 ft 0 in (2.13 m)	235 lb (107 kg)	Sr	Clearwater, Florida
G	41	Brian Gemberling	6 ft 5 in (1.96 m)	215 lb (98 kg)	So	Vero Beach, Florida
G	11	Bryan Hill	6 ft 4 in (1.93 m)	226 lb (103 kg)	Jr	Arlington, Virginia
F	32	Malcolm Mackey	6 ft 10 in (2.08 m)	243 lb (110 kg)	Jr	Chattanooga, Tennessee
F	33	Ivano Newbill	6 ft 9 in (2.06 m)	224 lb (102 kg)	So	Macon, Georgia
SG	24	Fred Vinson	6 ft 4 in (1.93 m)	185 lb (84 kg)	RS Jr	Conway, North Carolina
G	14	Greg White	6 ft 2 in (1.88 m)	168 lb (76 kg)	Sr	Norcross, Georgia

Head coach

- Bobby Cremins (South Carolina)

Assistant coach(es)

- Kevin Cantwell
- Sherman Dillard
- Jimmy Hebron

Legend

- (C) Team captain
- (S) Suspended
- (I) Ineligible
- (W) Walk-on
- Injured
- Current redshirt

== Schedule ==
Date time, TV	Rank^{#}	Opponent^{#}	Result	Record	Site city, state
Non-conference regular season
Nov 20, 1991*	No. 23	James Madison; Preseason NIT	W 93–69	1–0	Alexander Memorial Coliseum; Atlanta, Georgia
Nov 21, 1991*	No. 23	Colorado State; Preseason NIT	W 84–67	2–0	Alexander Memorial Coliseum; Atlanta, Georgia
Nov 27, 1991*	No. 18	vs. Texas; Preseason NIT Semifinal	W 120–107	3–0	Madison Square Garden; New York, New York
Nov 29, 1991*	No. 18	vs. No. 11 Oklahoma State; Preseason NIT Championship	L 71–78	3–1	Madison Square Garden; New York, New York
Dec 3, 1991*	No. 17	vs. Villanova; ACC-Big East Challenge	W 80–59	4–1	The Omni; Atlanta, Georgia
Dec 7, 1991*	No. 17	Chattanooga	W 97–84	5–1	Alexander Memorial Coliseum; Atlanta, Georgia
Dec 14, 1991*	No. 13	Georgia State	W 90–72	6–1	Alexander Memorial Coliseum; Atlanta, Georgia
Dec 18, 1991*	No. 13	vs. Georgia	L 65–66	6–2	The Omni; Atlanta, Georgia
Dec 21, 1991*	No. 13	vs. No. 8 Kentucky	W 81–80	7–2	The Omni; Atlanta, Georgia
Dec 28, 1991*	No. 13	Mercer	W 97–67	8–2	Alexander Memorial Coliseum; Atlanta, Georgia
Dec 30, 1991*	No. 15	St. Bonaventure	W 98–60	9–2	Alexander Memorial Coliseum; Atlanta, Georgia
Jan 2, 1992*	No. 15	Richmond	W 82–75	10–2	Alexander Memorial Coliseum; Atlanta, Georgia
ACC regular season
Jan 5, 1992	No. 15	Maryland	W 92–67	11–2 (1–0)	Alexander Memorial Coliseum; Atlanta, Georgia
Jan 8, 1992	No. 14	at NC State	W 80–63	12–2 (2–0)	Reynolds Coliseum; Raleigh, North Carolina
Jan 11, 1992	No. 14	at No. 1 Duke	L 84–97	12–3 (2–1)	Cameron Indoor Stadium; Durham, North Carolina
Mar 8, 1992*		Clemson	W 101–82	20–10 (8–8)	Alexander Memorial Coliseum; Atlanta, Georgia
ACC tournament
Mar 13, 1992*		vs. Virginia; Quarterfinals	W 68–56	21–10	Charlotte Coliseum; Charlotte, North Carolina
Mar 14, 1992*		vs. No. 1 Duke; Semifinals	L 76–89	21–11	Charlotte Coliseum; Charlotte, North Carolina
NCAA tournament
Mar 19, 1992*	(7 MW)	vs. (10 MW) Houston; First round	W 65–60	22–11	Bradley Center; Milwaukee, Wisconsin
Mar 21, 1992*	(7 MW)	vs. (2 MW) No. 8 USC; Second Round	W 79–78	23–11	Bradley Center (18,392); Milwaukee, Wisconsin
Mar 27, 1992*	(7 MW)	vs. (6 MW) Memphis State; Midwest Regional semifinal – Sweet Sixteen	L 79–83 ^{OT}	23–12	Kemper Arena; Kansas City, Missouri
*Non-conference game. ^{#}Rankings from AP poll. (#) Tournament seedings in parentheses. MW=Midwest.

== Players in the 1992 NBA draft ==
Round	Pick	Player	NBA club
2	42	Matt Geiger	Miami Heat
