= 1992 SEC men's basketball tournament =

- Classification: Division I
- Season: 1991–92
- Teams: 11
- Site: Birmingham-Jefferson Convention Complex; Birmingham, Alabama
- Champions: Kentucky (17th title)
- Winning coach: Rick Pitino (1st title)
- MVP: Jamal Mashburn (Kentucky)
- Attendance: 163,812 (sellout)
- Television: Jefferson Pilot Sports (entire tournament); ESPN (Championship Game, Outside the SEC Footprint)

1991–92 Southeastern Conference men's basketball standings
	Conf.				Overall
Team	W		L	PCT	W		L	PCT
East
No. 6 Kentucky †	12	–	4	.750	29	–	7	.806
Florida	9	–	7	.563	19	–	14	.576
Tennessee	8	–	8	.500	19	–	15	.559
Georgia	7	–	9	.438	15	–	14	.517
Vanderbilt	6	–	10	.375	15	–	15	.500
South Carolina	3	–	13	.188	11	–	17	.393
West
No. 9 Arkansas	13	–	3	.813	26	–	8	.765
No. 25 LSU	12	–	4	.750	21	–	10	.677
No. 13 Alabama	10	–	6	.625	26	–	9	.743
Mississippi State	7	–	9	.438	15	–	13	.536
Auburn	5	–	11	.313	12	–	15	.444
Ole Miss	4	–	12	.250	11	–	17	.393
† 1992 SEC tournament winner Rankings from AP Poll

The 1992 SEC men's basketball tournament took place from March 12–15, 1992 at the Birmingham-Jefferson Convention Complex in Birmingham, Alabama. The Kentucky Wildcats, who returned to the tournament after a two-year NCAA-sanctioned ban, won the tournament and received the SEC’s automatic bid to the 1992 NCAA Men’s Division I Basketball Tournament by defeating the Alabama Crimson Tide by a score of 80–54. That win would be Kentucky’s 17th overall SEC tournament title. Auburn did not participate, leaving only 11 teams in the field.

== Media coverage ==
Television coverage of the tournament was produced and regionally syndicated entirely by Jefferson Pilot Sports (known on air as JP Sports due to the initials used on the logo at the time), in its fifth year as the syndicated rightsholder of SEC Basketball. However, ESPN broadcast the championship game outside the SEC footprint.

== Bracket ==
First round
E4	Georgia	85
W5	Ole Miss	66
W4	Mississippi State	55
E5	Vanderbilt	77
E3	Tennessee	70
E6	South Carolina	63

Second Round
W1	#6 Arkansas	73
E4	Georgia	60
E2	Florida	60
W3	#17 Alabama	62
E1	#9 Kentucky	76
E5	Vanderbilt	57
W2	#23 LSU	99
E3	Tennessee	89

Semifinals
W1	#6 Arkansas	89
W3	#17 Alabama	90
E1	#9 Kentucky	80
W2	#23 LSU	74

Championship Game
E1	#9 Kentucky	80
W3	#17 Alabama	54
