= 1991–92 North Carolina Tar Heels men's basketball team =

American college basketball season

1991–92 North Carolina Tar Heels men's basketball

NCAA tournament, Sweet Sixteen
- Conference: Atlantic Coast Conference

Ranking
- Coaches: No. 14
- AP: No. 18
- Record: 23–10 (9–7 ACC)
- Head coach: Dean Smith (30th season)
- Assistant coach: Bill Guthridge (24th season)
- Home arena: Dean Smith Center

1991–92 ACC men's basketball standings
	Conf.				Overall
Team	W		L	PCT	W		L	PCT
No. 1 Duke †	14	–	2	.875	34	–	2	.944
No. 20 Florida State	11	–	5	.688	22	–	10	.688
No. 18 North Carolina	9	–	7	.563	23	–	10	.697
Georgia Tech	8	–	8	.500	23	–	12	.657
Virginia	8	–	8	.500	20	–	13	.606
Wake Forest	7	–	9	.438	17	–	12	.586
NC State	6	–	10	.375	12	–	18	.400
Maryland	5	–	11	.313	14	–	15	.483
Clemson	4	–	12	.250	14	–	14	.500
† 1992 ACC tournament winner Rankings from AP Poll

The 1991–92 North Carolina Tar Heels men's basketball team represented the University of North Carolina at Chapel Hill.

Led by head coach Dean Smith, the Tar Heels reached the Sweet 16 in the NCAA tournament.

== Roster ==
1991–92 North Carolina Tar Heels men's basketball team
Players
Coaches

Pos.	#	Name	Height	Weight	Year	Hometown
C	0	Eric Montross	7 ft 0 in (2.13 m)	270 lb (122 kg)	So	Indianapolis, Indiana
F	3	Pat Sullivan	6 ft 8 in (2.03 m)	—	So	Bogota, New Jersey
G/F	5	Henrik Rodl	6 ft 7 in (2.01 m)	—	Jr	Heusenstamm, Germany
G	11	Scott Cherry	6 ft 4 in (1.93 m)	—	Jr	Ballston Spa, New York
G	14	Derrick Phelps	6 ft 4 in (1.93 m)	180 lb (82 kg)	So	Pleasantville, New York
G	15	Jason Burgess	6 ft 3 in (1.91 m)	—	Sr	Charlotte, North Carolina
G	21	Donald Williams	6 ft 3 in (1.91 m)	—	Fr	Garner, North Carolina
F	31	Brian Reese	6 ft 6 in (1.98 m)	—	So	The Bronx, New York
F	33	Kevin Salvadori	7 ft 0 in (2.13 m)	—	So	Pittsburgh, Pennsylvania
F	34	George Lynch	6 ft 7 in (2.01 m)	—	Jr	Roanoke, Virginia
F	35	Travis Stephenson	6 ft 6 in (1.98 m)	—	Jr	Angier, North Carolina
G	40	Hubert Davis	6 ft 4 in (1.93 m)	185 lb (84 kg)	Sr	Burke, Virginia
F	43	Larry Smith	6 ft 8 in (2.03 m)	—	So	Smithfield, North Carolina
C	55	Matt Wenstrom	7 ft 1 in (2.16 m)	250 lb (113 kg)	Jr	Katy, Texas

Head coach

- Dean Smith (Kansas)

Assistant coach(es)

- Bill Guthridge (Kansas State)

Legend

- (C) Team captain
- (S) Suspended
- (I) Ineligible
- (W) Walk-on
- Injured
- Current redshirt

== Schedule and results ==
Date time, TV	Rank^{#}	Opponent^{#}	Result	Record	Site city, state
Regular season
Nov 24, 1991*	No. 8	The Citadel	W 97–58	1–0	Dean Smith Center; Chapel Hill, NC
Nov 27, 1991*	No. 6	at Houston	W 68–65	2–0	Hofheinz Pavilion; Houston, TX
Nov 30, 1991*	No. 6	Towson	W 98–88	3–0	Dean Smith Center; Chapel Hill, NC
Dec 1, 1991*	No. 6	Cornell	W 109–66	4–0	Dean Smith Center; Chapel Hill, NC
Dec 4, 1991*	No. 5	at No. 6 Seton Hall	W 83–54	5–0	Brendan Byrne Arena; East Rutherford, NJ
Jan 11, 1992*	No. 8	vs. Notre Dame	L 76–88	10–2	Madison Square Garden; New York, NY
ACC Tournament
Mar 13, 1992*	No. 20	vs. Wake Forest; ACC Tournament Quarterfinal	W 80–65	20–8	Charlotte Coliseum; Charlotte, NC
Mar 14, 1992*	No. 20	vs. No. 18 Florida State; ACC Tournament Semifinal	W 80–76	20–9	Charlotte Coliseum; Charlotte, NC
Mar 15, 1992*	No. 20	vs. No. 1 Duke; ACC tournament championship	L 74–94	21–9	Charlotte Coliseum; Charlotte, NC
NCAA Tournament
Mar 19, 1992*	(4 SE) No. 18	vs. (13 SE) Miami (OH); First round	W 68–63	22–9	Riverfront Coliseum; Cincinnati, Ohio
Mar 21, 1992*	(4 SE) No. 18	vs. (5 SE) No. 13 Alabama; Second Round	W 64–55	23–9	Riverfront Coliseum; Cincinnati, Ohio
Mar 27, 1992*	(4 SE) No. 18	vs. (1 SE) No. 3 Ohio State; Southeast Regional semifinal	L 73–80	23–10	Rupp Arena; Lexington, KY
*Non-conference game. ^{#}Rankings from AP. (#) Tournament seedings in parentheses. SE=Southeast. All times are in Eastern.
