= 1991–92 LSU Tigers basketball team =

American college basketball season

1991–92 LSU Tigers basketball

NCAA tournament, second round
- Conference: Southeast Conference
- West Division

Ranking
- AP: No. 25
- Record: 21–10 (12–4 SEC)
- Head coach: Dale Brown (20th season)
- Assistant coaches: Johnny Jones (8th season); Bob Starkey (2nd season)
- Home arena: Pete Maravich Assembly Center

1991–92 Southeastern Conference men's basketball standings
	Conf.				Overall
Team	W		L	PCT	W		L	PCT
East
No. 6 Kentucky †	12	–	4	.750	29	–	7	.806
Florida	9	–	7	.563	19	–	14	.576
Tennessee	8	–	8	.500	19	–	15	.559
Georgia	7	–	9	.438	15	–	14	.517
Vanderbilt	6	–	10	.375	15	–	15	.500
South Carolina	3	–	13	.188	11	–	17	.393
West
No. 9 Arkansas	13	–	3	.813	26	–	8	.765
No. 25 LSU	12	–	4	.750	21	–	10	.677
No. 13 Alabama	10	–	6	.625	26	–	9	.743
Mississippi State	7	–	9	.438	15	–	13	.536
Auburn	5	–	11	.313	12	–	15	.444
Ole Miss	4	–	12	.250	11	–	17	.393
† 1992 SEC tournament winner Rankings from AP Poll

The 1991-92 LSU Tigers men's basketball team represented Louisiana State University during the 1991–92 NCAA men's college basketball season. The head coach was Dale Brown. The team was a member of the Southeastern Conference and played their home games at Pete Maravich Assembly Center.

== Roster ==
1991–92 LSU Tigers men's basketball team
Players
Coaches

Pos.	#	Name	Height	Weight	Year	Previous school	Hometown
F	4	Jamie Brandon	6 ft 4 in (1.93 m)	220 lb (100 kg)	So		Chicago, IL
F	20	Clarence Ceasar	6 ft 8 in (2.03 m)	—	Fr
F	24	Vernel Singleton	6 ft 7 in (2.01 m)	210 lb (95 kg)	Sr
C	33	Shaquille O'Neal	7 ft 1 in (2.16 m)	290 lb (132 kg)	Jr	Robert G. Cole	Newark, NJ
C	43	Geert Hammink	7 ft 0 in (2.13 m)	260 lb (118 kg)	Jr		Didam, Netherlands

Head coach

- Dale Brown (Minot State)

Assistant coach(es)

Legend

- (C) Team captain
- (S) Suspended
- (I) Ineligible
- (W) Walk-on
- Injured
- Current redshirt

Roster

== Schedule and results ==
Date time, TV	Rank^{#}	Opponent^{#}	Result	Record	Site city, state
Exhibition
November 8*		Melbourne; Exhibition	W 96–60		Pete Maravich Assembly Center; Baton Rouge, LA
November 15*		Rancho Raiders; Exhibition	W 126–80		Pete Maravich Assembly Center; Baton Rouge, LA
Non-conference regular season
November 22*	No. 6	NE Louisiana	W 77–76	1–0	Pete Maravich Assembly Center; Baton Rouge, LA
November 27*	No. 9	Middle Tennessee St	W 96–65	2–0	Pete Maravich Assembly Center; Baton Rouge, LA
November 30*; 10:05 p.m.	No. 9	at UNLV	L 55–76	2–1	Thomas & Mack Center (17,436); Las Vegas, NV
December 7*	No. 16	at No. 3 Arizona	L 67–87	2–2	McKale Center; Tucson, AZ
December 17*		SE Louisiana	W 101–64	3–2	Pete Maravich Assembly Center; Baton Rouge, LA
December 21*		No. 25 Louisville	L 92–93	3–3	Pete Maravich Assembly Center; Baton Rouge, LA
December 28*		Northern Arizona	W 159–86	4–3	Pete Maravich Assembly Center; Baton Rouge, LA
December*		Nicholls State	W 123–61	5–3	Pete Maravich Assembly Center; Baton Rouge, LA
January 3*		vs. Texas	W 84–83	6–3	New Orleans, LA
SEC regular season
January 8		at Auburn	W 87–70	7–3 (1–0)	Beard–Eaves–Memorial Coliseum; Auburn, AL
January 11		No. 13 Arkansas	L 90–101	7–4 (1–1)	Pete Maravich Assembly Center; Baton Rouge, LA
January 14		at No. 9 Alabama	W 89–81	8–4 (2–1)	Coleman Coliseum; Tuscaloosa, AL
January 18; JP		at Mississippi St	W 83–70	9–4 (3–1)	Humphrey Coliseum; Starkville, MS
January 20*		McNeese St	W 115–67	10–4	Pete Maravich Assembly Center; Baton Rouge, LA
January 25		at Ole Miss	W 83–73	11–4 (4–1)	Tad Smith Coliseum; Oxford, MS
January 29		Tennessee	W 97–82	12–4 (5–1)	Pete Maravich Assembly Center; Baton Rouge, LA
February 2		No. 14 Kentucky	W 74–53	13–4 (6–1)	Pete Maravich Assembly Center; Baton Rouge, LA
February 5	No. 22	at Florida	W 70–50	14–4 (7–1)	Exactech Arena at Stephen C. O'Connell Center; Gainesville, FL
February 8*	No. 22	No. 1 Duke	L 67–77	14–5	Pete Maravich Assembly Center; Baton Rouge, LA
February 11	No. 20	Georgia	L 62–64	14–6 (7–2)	Pete Maravich Assembly Center; Baton Rouge, LA
February 15	No. 20	at Vanderbilt	L 69–76	14–7 (7–3)	Memorial Gymnasium; Nashville, TN
February 19		at South Carolina	W 74–56	15–7 (8–3)	Carolina Coliseum; Columbia, SC
February 22		Auburn	W 99–82	16–7 (9–3)	Pete Maravich Assembly Center; Baton Rouge, LA
February 25		Ole Miss	W 100–69	17–7 (10–3)	Pete Maravich Assembly Center; Baton Rouge, LA
February 29		No. 16 Alabama	W 73–65	18–7 (11–3)	Pete Maravich Assembly Center; Baton Rouge, LA
March 3	No. 23	at No. 7 Arkansas	L 92–106 ^{OT}	18–8 (11–4)	Bud Walton Arena; Fayetteville, AR
March 7	No. 23	Mississippi St	L 89–90	19–8 (12–4)	Pete Maravich Assembly Center; Baton Rouge, LA
SEC Tournament
March 13*; JP	No. 23	vs. Tennessee; SEC Tournament Quarterfinal	W 99–89	20–8	BJCC Coliseum; Birmingham, AL
March 14*; 12:00 p.m., JP	No. 23	vs. No. 9 Kentucky; SEC Tournament Semifinal	L 74–80	20–9	BJCC Coliseum; Birmingham, AL
NCAA Tournament
March 19*	(7 W) No. 25	vs. (10 W) BYU; NCAA Tournament First Round	W 94–83	21–9	BSU Pavilion; Boise, ID
March 21*	(7 W) No. 25	vs. (2 W) No. 5 Indiana; NCAA Tournament Second Round	L 79–89	21–10	BSU Pavilion; Boise, ID
*Non-conference game. ^{#}Rankings from AP Poll. (#) Tournament seedings in parentheses. W=West. All times are in Central Time.

== Awards and honors ==
- Shaquille O'Neal – SEC Player of the Year (2x), Consensus First-team All-American (2x)

== Team players drafted into the NBA ==
Round	Pick	Player	NBA club
1	1	Shaquille O'Neal	Orlando Magic
