= 1991–92 Arkansas Razorbacks men's basketball team =

American college basketball season

1991–92 Arkansas Razorbacks men's basketball

SEC regular season champions SEC West Division champions

NCAA tournament, Round of 32
- Conference: Southeastern Conference

Ranking
- Coaches: No. 8
- AP: No. 9
- Record: 26–8 (13–3 SEC)
- Head coach: Nolan Richardson
- Home arena: Barnhill Arena

1991–92 Southeastern Conference men's basketball standings
	Conf.				Overall
Team	W		L	PCT	W		L	PCT
East
No. 6 Kentucky †	12	–	4	.750	29	–	7	.806
Florida	9	–	7	.563	19	–	14	.576
Tennessee	8	–	8	.500	19	–	15	.559
Georgia	7	–	9	.438	15	–	14	.517
Vanderbilt	6	–	10	.375	15	–	15	.500
South Carolina	3	–	13	.188	11	–	17	.393
West
No. 9 Arkansas	13	–	3	.813	26	–	8	.765
No. 25 LSU	12	–	4	.750	21	–	10	.677
No. 13 Alabama	10	–	6	.625	26	–	9	.743
Mississippi State	7	–	9	.438	15	–	13	.536
Auburn	5	–	11	.313	12	–	15	.444
Ole Miss	4	–	12	.250	11	–	17	.393
† 1992 SEC tournament winner Rankings from AP Poll

The 1991–92 Arkansas Razorbacks men's basketball team represented the University of Arkansas in the 1991–92 college basketball season. The head coach was Nolan Richardson, serving for his seventh year. The team played its home games in Barnhill Arena in Fayetteville, Arkansas. In their first year of competition in the Southeastern Conference, Arkansas won the SEC West Division and SEC regular season championships. After beating Murray State in the first round of the NCAA Tournament, the Hogs were upset in the second round by Memphis State, led by Penny Hardaway.

Small forward Todd Day ended his college career as Arkansas' all-time leader in points scored for a career, surpassing former Razorback All-American Sidney Moncrief.

== Roster ==
1991–92 Arkansas Razorbacks men's basketball team
Players
Coaches

Pos.	#	Name	Height	Weight	Year	Hometown
G	10	Todd Day	6 ft 9 in (2.06 m)	188 lb (85 kg)	Sr	Memphis, Tennessee
G	11	Lee Mayberry	6 ft 1 in (1.85 m)	170 lb (77 kg)	Sr	Tulsa, Oklahoma
G	12	Clint McDaniel	6 ft 4 in (1.93 m)	180 lb (82 kg)	Fr	Tulsa, Oklahoma
C	25	Oliver Miller	6 ft 9 in (2.06 m)	270 lb (122 kg)	Sr	Fort Worth, Texas
F	35	Isaiah Morris	6 ft 8 in (2.03 m)	220 lb (100 kg)	Sr	Richmond, Virginia

Head coach

- Nolan Richardson (UTEP)

Assistant coach(es)

Legend

- (C) Team captain
- (S) Suspended
- (I) Ineligible
- (W) Walk-on
- Injured
- Current redshirt

== Schedule and results ==
Date time, TV	Rank^{#}	Opponent^{#}	Result	Record	Site city, state
Regular season
Nov 25, 1991*; ESPN	No. 2	vs. Minnesota; Maui Invitational Quarterfinals	W 92–83	1–0	Lahaina Civic Center; Maui, HI
Nov 26, 1991*; ESPN	No. 2	vs. Chaminade; Maui Invitational Semifinals	W 99–84	2–0	Lahaina Civic Center; Maui, HI
Nov 27, 1991*; ESPN	No. 2	vs. Michigan State; Maui Invitational Championship	L 71–86	2–1	Lahaina Civic Center; Maui, HI
Dec 2, 1991*	No. 11	vs. Alabama State	W 96–80	3–1	K.L. Johnson Complex; Pine Bluff, AR
Dec 4, 1991*	No. 11	Bethune-Cookman	W 128–46	4–1	Barnhill Arena; Fayetteville, AR
Dec 7, 1991*	No. 11	Missouri	L 76–87	4–2	Barnhill Arena; Fayetteville, AR
Dec 10, 1991*	No. 19	at Kansas State	W 70–59	5–2	Bramlage Coliseum; Manhattan, KS
Dec 19, 1991*	No. 19	Montevallo	W 91–70	6–2	Barnhill Arena; Fayetteville, AR
Dec 21, 1991*	No. 19	No. 2 Arizona	W 65–59	7–2	Barnhill Arena; Fayetteville, AR
Dec 23, 1991*	No. 15	at Tulsa	W 74–64	8–2	Tulsa Convention Center; Tulsa, OK
Dec 28, 1991*	No. 15	Jackson State	W 89–66	9–2	K.L. Johnson Complex; Pine Bluff, AR
Dec 30, 1991*	No. 16	South Alabama	W 101–82	10–2	Mobile Civic Center; Mobile, AL
Jan 2, 1992*	No. 16	Quincy	W 123–60	11–2	K.L. Johnson Complex; Pine Bluff, AR
Jan 4, 1992	No. 16	Auburn	W 110–92	12–2 (1–0)	Barnhill Arena; Fayetteville, AR
Jan 8, 1992	No. 13	No. 16 Alabama	L 63–65	12–3 (1–1)	Coleman Coliseum; Tuscaloosa, AL
Jan 11, 1992	No. 13	at LSU	W 101–90	13–3 (2–1)	Maravich Assembly Center; Baton Rouge, LA
Jan 15, 1992	No. 12	Mississippi State	W 99–78	14–3 (3–1)	Barnhill Arena; Fayetteville, AR
Jan 18, 1992	No. 12	at Ole Miss	W 114–93	15–3 (4–1)	Tad Smith Coliseum; Oxford, MS
Jan 22, 1992	No. 9	Florida	W 75–62	16–3 (5–1)	Barnhill Arena; Fayetteville, AR
Jan 25, 1992	No. 9	at No. 8 Kentucky	W 105–88	17–3 (6–1)	Rupp Arena; Lexington, KY
Feb 5, 1992	No. 5	at Tennessee	L 81–83	17–4 (6–2)	Thompson-Boling Arena; Knoxville, TN
Feb 8, 1992*	No. 5	at Memphis State	L 88–92	17–5	Pyramid Arena; Memphis, TN
Feb 12, 1992	No. 11	Vanderbilt	W 91–71	18–5 (7–2)	Barnhill Arena; Fayetteville, AR
Feb 15, 1992	No. 11	South Carolina	W 89–73	19–5 (8–2)	Barnhill Arena; Fayetteville, AR
Feb 18, 1992; JPS	No. 10	at Georgia	L 78–87	19–6 (8–3)	Stegeman Coliseum; Athens, GA
Feb 22, 1992	No. 10	No. 14 Alabama	W 90–87	20–6 (9–3)	Barnhill Arena; Fayetteville, AR
Feb 26, 1992	No. 9	at Auburn	W 82–74	21–6 (10–3)	Memorial Coliseum; Auburn, AL
Feb 29, 1992	No. 9	at Mississippi State	W 84–76	22–6 (11–3)	Humphrey Coliseum; Starkville, MS
Mar 3, 1992	No. 7	No. 23 LSU	W 106–92 ^{OT}	23–6 (12–3)	Barnhill Arena; Fayetteville, AR
Mar 7, 1992	No. 7	Ole Miss	W 100–83	24–6 (13–3)	Barnhill Arena; Fayetteville, AR
SEC Tournament
Mar 13, 1992*; JPS	No. 6	vs. Georgia; Quarterfinal	W 73–60	25–6	BJCC Arena; Birmingham, AL
Mar 14, 1992*; JPS	No. 6	vs. No. 17 Alabama; Semifinal	L 89–90	25–7	BJCC Arena; Birmingham, AL
NCAA Tournament
Mar 19, 1992*; CBS	(MW3) No. 9	vs. (MW14) Murray State; Midwest Regional First Round	W 80–69	26–7	Bradley Center; Milwaukee, WI
Mar 21, 1992*; CBS	(MW3) No. 9	vs. (MW6) Memphis State; Midwest Regional Second Round	L 80–82	26–8	Bradley Center; Milwaukee, WI
*Non-conference game. ^{#}Rankings from AP Poll. (#) Tournament seedings in parentheses.

== Team players in the 1992 NBA draft ==
Round	Pick	Player	NBA club
1	8	Todd Day	Milwaukee Bucks
1	22	Oliver Miller	Phoenix Suns
1	23	Lee Mayberry	Milwaukee Bucks
2	37	Isaiah Morris	Miami Heat
