= 1991–92 Florida State Seminoles men's basketball team =

American college basketball season

1991–92 Florida State Seminoles men's basketball

NCAA tournament, Sweet Sixteen
- Conference: Atlantic Coast Conference

Ranking
- Coaches: No. 17
- AP: No. 20
- Record: 22–10 (11–5 ACC)
- Head coach: Pat Kennedy (6th season)
- Home arena: Tallahassee-Leon County Civic Center

1991–92 ACC men's basketball standings
	Conf.				Overall
Team	W		L	PCT	W		L	PCT
No. 1 Duke †	14	–	2	.875	34	–	2	.944
No. 20 Florida State	11	–	5	.688	22	–	10	.688
No. 18 North Carolina	9	–	7	.563	23	–	10	.697
Georgia Tech	8	–	8	.500	23	–	12	.657
Virginia	8	–	8	.500	20	–	13	.606
Wake Forest	7	–	9	.438	17	–	12	.586
NC State	6	–	10	.375	12	–	18	.400
Maryland	5	–	11	.313	14	–	15	.483
Clemson	4	–	12	.250	14	–	14	.500
† 1992 ACC tournament winner Rankings from AP Poll

The 1991–92 Florida State Seminoles men's basketball team represented Florida State University as first-time members of the Atlantic Coast Conference during the 1991–92 NCAA Division I men's basketball season. Led by head coach Pat Kennedy, and future NBA players Sam Cassell, Doug Edwards, Bob Sura, and Charlie Ward, the Seminoles reached the Sweet Sixteen of the NCAA tournament. For the second consecutive season, Florida State was eliminated from NCAA Tournament play by a top five-ranked Indiana team. The team finished with an overall record of 22–10 (11–5 ACC).

== Roster ==
1991–92 Florida State Seminoles men's basketball team
Players
Coaches

Pos.	#	Name	Height	Weight	Year	Previous school	Hometown
G	3	Bob Sura	6 ft 5 in (1.96 m)	195 lb (88 kg)	Fr	G.A.R. Memorial	Wilkes-Barre, Pennsylvania
G	4	Chuck Graham	6 ft 3 in (1.91 m)	190 lb (86 kg)	Jr	Richmond Academy	Augusta, Georgia
G/F	5	Ray Donald	6 ft 8 in (2.03 m)	205 lb (93 kg)	Fr	Washington	Pensacola, Florida
G	10	Sam Cassell	6 ft 3 in (1.91 m)	195 lb (88 kg)	Jr	San Jacinto JC	Baltimore, Maryland
G	11	Lorenzo Hands (injured)	6 ft 3 in (1.91 m)	195 lb (88 kg)	Sr	Twin Lakes	West Palm Beach, Florida
G	12	Charlie Ward	6 ft 1 in (1.85 m)	190 lb (86 kg)	So	Central	Thomasville, Georgia
G	23	Ron Miller	6 ft 3 in (1.91 m)	190 lb (86 kg)	Sr	Mercer	Tallahassee, Florida
F	32	Doug Edwards	6 ft 9 in (2.06 m)	220 lb (100 kg)	Jr	Miami Senior	Miami, Florida
F	33	Byron Wells	6 ft 10 in (2.08 m)	235 lb (107 kg)	Jr	King	Tampa, Florida
F/C	34	Rodney Dobard	6 ft 9 in (2.06 m)	210 lb (95 kg)	Jr	Atlantic	Delray Beach, Florida
C	44	Andre Reid	7 ft 0 in (2.13 m)	250 lb (113 kg)	So	Sunset	Miami, Florida

Head coach

- Pat Kennedy (King's College)

Assistant coach(es)

- Kenny Williamson
- David Zimroth
- Tom Carlson

Legend

- (C) Team captain
- (S) Suspended
- (I) Ineligible
- (W) Walk-on
- Injured
- Current redshirt

== Schedule ==
Date time, TV	Rank^{#}	Opponent^{#}	Result	Record	Site city, state
Regular season
Nov 26, 1991*		Jacksonville	W 100–91	1–0	Tallahassee-Leon County Civic Center; Tallahassee, Florida
Dec 3, 1991*		vs. Syracuse; Big East-ACC Challenge	L 71–89	1–1	Omni Coliseum; Atlanta, GA
Dec 6, 1991*		Southern	W 95–75	2–1	Tallahassee-Leon County Civic Center; Tallahassee, FL
Dec 7, 1991*		Florida A&M	W 2–0	3–1	Tallahassee-Leon County Civic Center; Tallahassee, FL
Dec 16, 1991		at No. 9 North Carolina	W 86–74	4–1 (1–0)	Dean Smith Center; Chapel Hill, NC
Dec 20, 1991*		at South Florida	L 88–92	4–2	Sun Dome; Tampa, FL
Dec 23, 1991*		Robert Morris	W 76–60	5–2	Tallahassee-Leon County Civic Center; Tallahassee, FL
Dec 29, 1991*		Duquesne	W 88–73	6–2	Tallahassee-Leon County Civic Center; Tallahassee, FL
Jan 2, 1992*		UNC Asheville	W 107–54	7–2	Tallahassee-Leon County Civic Center; Tallahassee, FL
Jan 4, 1992		Virginia	L 68–77	7–3 (1–1)	Tallahassee-Leon County Civic Center; Tallahassee, FL
Jan 6, 1992		at No. 1 Duke	L 70–86	7–4 (1–2)	Cameron Indoor Stadium; Durham, NC
Jan 11, 1992		at No. 19 Wake Forest	W 88–85	8–4 (2–2)	Lawrence Joel Coliseum; Winston-Salem, NC
Jan 18, 1992		at Maryland	W 91–83	9–4 (3–2)	Cole Fieldhouse; College Park, MD
Jan 20, 1992*		Mercer	W 78–64	10–4	Tallahassee-Leon County Civic Center; Tallahassee, FL
Jan 23, 1992		at No. 18 Georgia Tech	W 83–79	11–4 (4–2)	Alexander Memorial Coliseum; Atlanta, GA
Jan 25, 1992		NC State	W 98–76	12–4 (5–2)	Tallahassee-Leon County Civic Center; Tallahassee, FL
Jan 27, 1992*	No. 23	at Florida	W 68–67	13–4	Stephen C. O'Connell Center; Gainesville, FL
Jan 30, 1992	No. 23	No. 1 Duke	L 62–75	13–5 (5–3)	Tallahassee-Leon County Civic Center; Tallahassee, FL
Feb 1, 1992	No. 23	Wake Forest	W 79–78	14–5 (6–3)	Tallahassee-Leon County Civic Center; Tallahassee, FL
Feb 5, 1992	No. 23	Maryland	L 85–93	14–6 (6–4)	Tallahassee-Leon County Civic Center; Tallahassee, FL
Feb 8, 1992	No. 23	Clemson	W 102–90	15–6 (7–4)	Tallahassee-Leon County Civic Center; Tallahassee, FL
Feb 10, 1992	No. 23	at NC State	W 87–79	16–6 (8–4)	Reynolds Coliseum; Raleigh, NC
Feb 13, 1992	No. 23	at Virginia	W 64–63	17–6 (9–4)	University Hall (University of Virginia); Charlottesville, VA
Feb 15, 1992	No. 23	Georgia Tech	W 80–67	18–6 (10–4)	Tallahassee-Leon County Civic Center; Tallahassee, FL
Feb 18, 1992	No. 16	at Clemson	L 67–68	18–7 (10–5)	Littlejohn Coliseum; Clemson, SC
Feb 23, 1992*	No. 16	vs. DePaul	L 75–85	18–8	(17,682); Chicago, IL
Feb 27, 1992	No. 22	No. 10 North Carolina	W 110–94	19–8 (11–5)	Tallahassee-Leon County Civic Center; Tallahassee, FL
ACC Tournament
Mar 13, 1992*	No. 18	vs. NC State; ACC Tournament Quarterfinal	W 93–80	20–8	Charlotte Coliseum; Charlotte, NC
Mar 14, 1992*	No. 18	vs. No. 20 North Carolina; ACC Tournament Semifinal	L 76–80	20–9	Charlotte Coliseum; Charlotte, NC
NCAA Tournament
Mar 19, 1992*; CBS	(3 W) No. 20	vs. (14 W) Montana; First round	W 78–68	21–9	BSU Pavilion (12,208); Boise, ID
Mar 21, 1992*; CBS	(3 W) No. 20	vs. (6 W) No. 22 Georgetown; Second Round	W 78–68	22–9	BSU Pavilion (12,200); Boise, ID
Mar 26, 1992*; CBS	(3 W) No. 20	vs. (2 W) No. 5 Indiana; West Regional semifinal	L 74–85	22–10	University Arena (15,914); Albuquerque, NM
*Non-conference game. ^{#}Rankings from AP. (#) Tournament seedings in parentheses. W=West. All times are in Eastern.

== Awards and honors ==
- Sam Cassell – AP Honorable Mention All-American
- Bob Sura – ACC Rookie of the Year
- Pat Kennedy – ACC Coach of the Year
