= 1991–92 Wake Forest Demon Deacons men's basketball team =

American college basketball season

1991–92 Wake Forest Demon Deacons men's basketball

NCAA tournament, first round
- Conference: Atlantic Coast Conference
- Record: 17–12 (7–9 ACC)
- Head coach: Dave Odom (3rd season)
- Assistant coaches: Larry Davis; Ricky Stokes; Jerry Wainwright
- Home arena: LJVM Coliseum

1991–92 ACC men's basketball standings
| | Conf. | | | | Overall |
| Team | W | | L | PCT | W | | L | PCT |
|---|---|---|---|---|---|---|---|---|
| No. 1 Duke † | 14 | – | 2 | .875 | 34 | – | 2 | .944 |
| No. 20 Florida State | 11 | – | 5 | .688 | 22 | – | 10 | .688 |
| No. 18 North Carolina | 9 | – | 7 | .563 | 23 | – | 10 | .697 |
| Georgia Tech | 8 | – | 8 | .500 | 23 | – | 12 | .657 |
| Virginia | 8 | – | 8 | .500 | 20 | – | 13 | .606 |
| Wake Forest | 7 | – | 9 | .438 | 17 | – | 12 | .586 |
| NC State | 6 | – | 10 | .375 | 12 | – | 18 | .400 |
| Maryland | 5 | – | 11 | .313 | 14 | – | 15 | .483 |
| Clemson | 4 | – | 12 | .250 | 14 | – | 14 | .500 |
† 1992 ACC tournament winner Rankings from AP Poll

The 1991–92 Wake Forest Demon Deacons men's basketball team represented Wake Forest University as a member of the Atlantic Coast Conference during the 1991–92 NCAA men's basketball season. The team was led by third year head coach Dave Odom, and played their home games at LJVM Coliseum in Winston-Salem, North Carolina.

The Demon Deacons finished sixth in the rugged ACC with an 7–9 conference record. The team lost to North Carolina in the quarterfinal round of the ACC tournament. The team received an at-large bid to the NCAA tournament as No. 9 seed in the West region. Making their second straight appearance in the "Big Dance," Wake Forest was eliminated by Louisville in the opening round to finish with a 17–12 overall record.

== Previous season ==
Wake Forest took a big step forward by finishing in a tie for third in the ACC regular season standings with an 8–6 conference record. They lost to Virginia in the quarterfinal round of the ACC tournament. Despite the early exit from the conference tournament, the Demon Deacons received the No. 5 seed in the Southeast region of the NCAA tournament – the school's first appearance in seven years. The team defeated No. 12 seed Louisiana Tech before losing to No. 4 seed Alabama in the round of 32 in a rematch of an early-season OT thriller. Wake Forest finished with a 19–11 record (8–6 ACC).

Freshman Rodney Rogers was named ACC Rookie of the Year and head coach Dave Odom was named ACC Coach of Year for the first time.

== Roster ==
1991–92 Wake Forest Demon Deacons men's basketball team
Players
Coaches

| Pos. | # | Name | Height | Weight | Year | Previous school | Hometown |
|---|---|---|---|---|---|---|---|
| G | 25 | Marc Blucas | 6 ft 3 in (1.91 m) | 190 lb (86 kg) | So | Girard HS | Girard, PA |
| G | 11 | Charlie Harrison | 6 ft 1 in (1.85 m) | 165 lb (75 kg) | So | Archbishop Carroll | Washington, DC |
| F/C | 21 | Derrick Hicks | 6 ft 9 in (2.06 m) | 220 lb (100 kg) | Jr | Anderson JC | Raleigh, NC |
| G | 22 | Randolph Childress | 6 ft 2 in (1.88 m) | 175 lb (79 kg) | RS Fr | Flint Hill School | Clinton, MD |
| F | 44 | Chris King | 6 ft 8 in (2.03 m) | 215 lb (98 kg) | Sr | Hobbton HS | Newton Grove, NC |
| C | 51 | Stan King | 7 ft 0 in (2.13 m) | 252 lb (114 kg) | So | August Martin | Jamaica, NY |
| F | 40 | Trelonnie Owens | 6 ft 8 in (2.03 m) | 245 lb (111 kg) | So | Bladenboro HS | Bladenboro, NC |
| F | 35 | David Rasmussen | 6 ft 7 in (2.01 m) | 190 lb (86 kg) | Jr | Ricks JC | East Lansing, MI |
| F | 54 | Rodney Rogers | 6 ft 7 in (2.01 m) | 235 lb (107 kg) | So | Southern HS | Durham, NC |
| F | 31 | Anthony Tucker | 6 ft 8 in (2.03 m) | 220 lb (100 kg) | Sr | Georgetown; McKinley HS | Washington, D.C. |

Head coach

- Dave Odom

Assistant coach(es)

- Larry Davis
- Ricky Stokes
- Jerry Wainwright

Legend

- (C) Team captain
- (S) Suspended
- (I) Ineligible
- (W) Walk-on
- Injured
- Current redshirt

Roster
Last update: March 14, 2021

== Schedule and results ==
| Date time, TV | Rank^{#} | Opponent^{#} | Result | Record | Site city, state |
Regular Season
| Nov 23, 1991* | No. 22 | UNC Greensboro | W 87–59 | 1–0 | Lawrence Joel Coliseum; Winston-Salem, North Carolina |
| Nov 25, 1991* | No. 22 | The Citadel | W 97–57 | 2–0 | Lawrence Joel Coliseum; Winston-Salem, North Carolina |
| Nov 30, 1991* | No. 22 | Fairfield | W 91–62 | 3–0 | Lawrence Joel Coliseum; Winston-Salem, North Carolina |
| Dec 2, 1991* | No. 23 | at No. 12 Connecticut; ACC/BIG EAST Challenge | L 75–84 | 3–1 | Gampel Pavilion (13,169); Storrs, Connecticut |
| Dec 7, 1991* | No. 23 | at Fairleigh Dickinson | W 66–43 | 4–1 | Rothman Center; Hackensack, New Jersey |
| Dec 18, 1991* | No. 22 | VMI | W 74–43 | 5–1 | Lawrence Joel Coliseum; Winston-Salem, North Carolina |
| Dec 21, 1991* | No. 22 | at Richmond | W 74–60 | 6–1 | Robins Center; Richmond, Virginia |
| Feb 3, 1992* | | No. 14 Tulane | W 69–66 | 12–6 | Lawrence Joel Coliseum; Winston-Salem, North Carolina |
| Mar 1, 1992* | | Temple | W 83–75 | 17–8 | Lawrence Joel Coliseum; Winston-Salem, North Carolina |
ACC Tournament
| Mar 13, 1992* | | vs. No. 20 North Carolina; Quarterfinals | L 65–80 | 17–11 | Charlotte Coliseum; Charlotte, North Carolina |
NCAA Tournament
| Mar 20, 1992* | (9 W) | vs. (8 W) Louisville; First Round | L 58–81 | 17–12 | ASU Activity Center; Tempe, Arizona |
*Non-conference game. ^{#}Rankings from AP Poll. (#) Tournament seedings in parentheses. W=West. All times are in Eastern Time.

== Team players in the 1992 NBA draft ==
| Round | Pick | Player | NBA club |
|---|---|---|---|
| 2 | 45 | Chris King | Seattle SuperSonics |
