= I Hate Christian Laettner =

2015 sports documentary film

I Hate Christian Laettner is a 2015 ESPN 30 for 30 documentary directed by Rory Karpf.

== Summary ==
It examines the love/hate relationship towards Duke University basketball player Christian Laettner, and explores five factors which the film-makers believe explain the widespread and persistent hatred: privilege, race, bullying, greatness, and physical appearance. It is narrated by Rob Lowe.

== Reception ==
The A.V. Club called it a "too cute approach to one of college basketball's greatest villains" while Variety praised it as "an amusing, affectionate and quite informative look at the hostility directed at the Duke basketball star of the early 1990s."

== See also ==
- Anti-fan
- Duke–Michigan rivalry, featured in the film
- Fab Five, the key University of Michigan men's basketball players during Laettner's Duke career
  - The Fab Five, ESPN documentary on the above group
- Christian Laettner
- The Shot (Duke–Kentucky), also featured in the film
- List of basketball films
