= 1991–92 Virginia Cavaliers men's basketball team =

American college basketball season

1991–92 Virginia Cavaliers men's basketball

NIT, Champions
- Conference: Atlantic Coast Conference
- Record: 20–13 (8–8 ACC)
- Head coach: Jeff Jones (2nd season)
- Assistant coaches: Brian Ellerbe (2nd season); Tom Perrin (5th season); Dennis Wolff (2nd; Greg Domecq 3rd season)
- Home arena: University Hall

1991–92 ACC men's basketball standings
	Conf.				Overall
Team	W		L	PCT	W		L	PCT
No. 1 Duke †	14	–	2	.875	34	–	2	.944
No. 20 Florida State	11	–	5	.688	22	–	10	.688
No. 18 North Carolina	9	–	7	.563	23	–	10	.697
Georgia Tech	8	–	8	.500	23	–	12	.657
Virginia	8	–	8	.500	20	–	13	.606
Wake Forest	7	–	9	.438	17	–	12	.586
NC State	6	–	10	.375	12	–	18	.400
Maryland	5	–	11	.313	14	–	15	.483
Clemson	4	–	12	.250	14	–	14	.500
† 1992 ACC tournament winner Rankings from AP Poll

The 1991–92 Virginia Cavaliers men's basketball team represented the University of Virginia during the 1991–92 NCAA Division I men's basketball season. The team was led by second-year head coach Jeff Jones, and played their home games at University Hall in Charlottesville, Virginia, as members of the Atlantic Coast Conference.

== Roster ==
1991–92 Virginia Cavaliers men's basketball team
Players
Coaches

Pos.	#	Name	Height	Weight	Year	Hometown
G	4	Terry Kirby	6 ft 3 in (1.91 m)	217 lb (98 kg)	Jr	Tabb, Virginia
PF	5	Junior Burrough	6 ft 8 in (2.03 m)	239 lb (108 kg)	Fr	Charlotte, North Carolina
G	10	Anthony Oliver	6 ft 4 in (1.93 m)	189 lb (86 kg)	Sr	Faison, North Carolina
G	11	Doug Smith	6 ft 1 in (1.85 m)	174 lb (79 kg)	Jr	Fayetteville, Tennessee
PG	12	Cory Alexander	6 ft 1 in (1.85 m)	176 lb (80 kg)	Fr	Waynesboro, Virginia
G	15	Chris Havlicek	6 ft 5 in (1.96 m)	195 lb (88 kg)	So	Weston, Massachusetts
G/F	20	Bryant Stith	6 ft 5 in (1.96 m)	208 lb (94 kg)	Sr	Emporia, Virginia
G	21	Derrick Johnson	6 ft 1 in (1.85 m)	169 lb (77 kg)	So	Plainfield, New Jersey
F	22	Jason Williford	6 ft 6 in (1.98 m)	200 lb (91 kg)	Fr	Richmond, Virginia
F	24	Yuri Barnes	6 ft 8 in (2.03 m)	223 lb (101 kg)	Fr	Richmond, Virginia
G	30	Chris Alexander	6 ft 8 in (2.03 m)	207 lb (94 kg)	Fr	Long Branch, New Jersey
G	31	Bobby Graves	6 ft 4 in (1.93 m)	193 lb (88 kg)	Fr	Herndon, Virginia
G	33	Cornel Parker	6 ft 7 in (2.01 m)	187 lb (85 kg)	So	Norfolk, Virginia
F/C	42	Ted Jeffries	6 ft 9 in (2.06 m)	250 lb (113 kg)	Jr	Bowie, Maryland
F	44	Corey Stewart	6 ft 7 in (2.01 m)	222 lb (101 kg)	So	Hampton, Virginia
F/C	52	Shawn Wilson	6 ft 11 in (2.11 m)	221 lb (100 kg)	So	Franklin, Tennessee

Head coach

- Jeff Jones

Assistant coach(es)

- Brian Ellerbe
- Tom Perrin
- Dennis Wolff
- Greg Domecq

Legend

- (C) Team captain
- (S) Suspended
- (I) Ineligible
- (W) Walk-on
- Injured
- Current redshirt

Roster

== Schedule and results ==
Date time, TV	Rank^{#}	Opponent^{#}	Result	Record	Site city, state
Regular season
ACC Tournament
Mar 13, 1992*	(5)	vs. (4) Georgia Tech; Quarterfinals	L 56–68	15–13	Charlotte Coliseum; Charlotte, North Carolina
National Invitation Tournament
Mar 18, 1992*		at Villanova	W 83–80	16–13	The Pavilion; Philadelphia, Pennsylvania
Mar 23, 1992*		Tennessee	W 77–52	17–13	University Hall; Charlottesville, Virginia
Mar 27, 1992*		New Mexico	W 76–71	18–13	Richmond Coliseum; Richmond, Virginia
Mar 30, 1992*		vs. Florida; Semifinals	W 62–56	19–13	Madison Square Garden; New York, New York
Apr 1, 1992*		vs. Notre Dame; Championship Game	W 81–76 ^{OT}	20–13	Madison Square Garden; New York, New York
*Non-conference game. ^{#}Rankings from AP Poll. (#) Tournament seedings in parentheses.
