= 1991–92 Kentucky Wildcats men's basketball team =

1991–92 season of University of Kentucky men's basketball team

1991–92 Kentucky Wildcats men's basketball
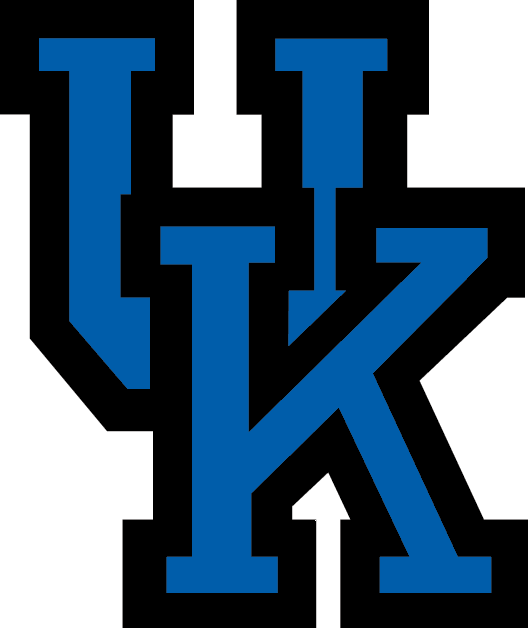

SEC East and tournament champions

NCAA tournament, Elite Eight
- Conference: Southeastern Conference

Ranking
- Coaches: No. 9
- AP: No. 6
- Record: 29–7 (12–4 SEC)
- Head coach: Rick Pitino (3rd season)
- Assistant coaches: Herb Sendek; Billy Donovan; Bernadette Locke-Mattox
- Home arena: Rupp Arena

1991–92 Southeastern Conference men's basketball standings
	Conf.				Overall
Team	W		L	PCT	W		L	PCT
East
No. 6 Kentucky †	12	–	4	.750	29	–	7	.806
Florida	9	–	7	.563	19	–	14	.576
Tennessee	8	–	8	.500	19	–	15	.559
Georgia	7	–	9	.438	15	–	14	.517
Vanderbilt	6	–	10	.375	15	–	15	.500
South Carolina	3	–	13	.188	11	–	17	.393
West
No. 9 Arkansas	13	–	3	.813	26	–	8	.765
No. 25 LSU	12	–	4	.750	21	–	10	.677
No. 13 Alabama	10	–	6	.625	26	–	9	.743
Mississippi State	7	–	9	.438	15	–	13	.536
Auburn	5	–	11	.313	12	–	15	.444
Ole Miss	4	–	12	.250	11	–	17	.393
† 1992 SEC tournament winner Rankings from AP Poll

The 1991–92 Kentucky Wildcats men's basketball team represented the University of Kentucky in NCAA competition in the 1991–92 season. The team was coached by Rick Pitino.

Due to major recruiting violations committed by Pitino's predecessor Eddie Sutton, the 1991–92 Wildcats were coming off a three-year postseason ban where the team was not allowed to compete in tournament play. (Note the NCAA did not find Sutton personally liable.) The violations had mainly centered on alleged cheating by 1987–89 player Eric Manuel on the ACT college entrance exam and cash payments to the guardian of another former player, Chris Mills.

The 1991–92 season was the first year after probation when the Wildcats were allowed to compete and the only opportunity for the team's four seniors, who remained loyal to the program as opposed to transferring to teams allowed in the tournament. Three of these seniors were Kentucky natives. Together, all four would enter Kentucky basketball history as "The Unforgettables":

- Richie Farmer, a 6'0"/1.83 m shooting guard from Manchester, a small town in the commonwealth's eastern coal fields.
- Deron Feldhaus, a 6'7"/2.01 m forward from Maysville, a small Ohio River town in the Bluegrass region, about an hour's drive upriver from Cincinnati.
- John Pelphrey, a 6'8"/2.03 m forward from another eastern coal town, Paintsville.
- Sean Woods, the only non-Kentuckian "Unforgettable," a 6'2"/1.88 m point guard from Indianapolis.

The sophomore Jamal Mashburn would go on to become a consensus first-team All-American the following season and have a 12-year NBA career; he is now a college basketball analyst for TNT Sports.

The Wildcats' run in the NCAA tournament would end in a regional final against Duke that is often cited as the greatest college game ever played. The heavily favored Blue Devils survived an overtime thriller on Christian Laettner's last-second shot at the buzzer.

== Team legacy ==
The legacy of "The Unforgettables" was so great within the university that the UK program decided to retire the players' jerseys (but not their numbers) almost immediately after their final tournament game. (While jersey retirement is not uncommon, it is rare for a school to bestow this honor so soon after a player's career ends.) The team also went on a post-tournament all-county exhibition tour, where thousands of Kentuckians gathered in high school gyms across the commonwealth to meet and express pride in the team.

National and local sports news outlets continued to cover the players in "where are they now" and similar features for at least 25 years after the tournament. In 2005, a documentary film about the team, "Beyond the Glory," was released.

== Roster ==
1991–92 Kentucky Wildcats men's basketball team
Players
Coaches

Pos.	#	Name	Height	Weight	Year	Previous school	Hometown
G	3	Chris Harrison	6 ft 3 in (1.91 m)	165 lb (75 kg)	Fr	Tollesboro HS	Tollesboro, KY
G	5	Travis Ford	5 ft 9 in (1.75 m)	165 lb (75 kg)	So	North Hopkins HS; Missouri	Madisonville, KY
C	10	Andre Riddick	6 ft 9 in (2.06 m)	190 lb (86 kg)	Fr	Bishop Loughlin	New York, NY
G	11	Sean Woods	6 ft 2 in (1.88 m)	180 lb (82 kg)	Sr	Cathedral HS	Indianapolis, IN
F	12	Deron Feldhaus	6 ft 7 in (2.01 m)	210 lb (95 kg)	Sr	Mason County HS	Maysville, KY
G	14	Jeff Brassow	6 ft 5 in (1.96 m)	195 lb (88 kg)	Jr	Elsik HS	Houston, TX
G	23	Junior Braddy	6 ft 3 in (1.91 m)	190 lb (86 kg)	Jr	Middleburg HS	Jacksonville, FL
F	24	Jamal Mashburn	6 ft 8 in (2.03 m)	240 lb (109 kg)	So	Cardinal Hayes HS	Bronx, NY
F	25	Aminu Timberlake	6 ft 9 in (2.06 m)	195 lb (88 kg)	Fr	De La Salle	Chicago, IL
G	31	Dale Brown	6 ft 3 in (1.91 m)	200 lb (91 kg)	Jr	Pascagoula HS; Gulf Coast CC	Pascagoula, MS
G	32	Richie Farmer	6 ft 0 in (1.83 m)	170 lb (77 kg)	Sr	Clay County HS	Manchester, KY
G/F	34	John Pelphrey	6 ft 7 in (2.01 m)	195 lb (88 kg)	Sr	Paintsville HS	Paintsville, KY
G	42	Carlos Toomer	6 ft 4 in (1.93 m)	190 lb (86 kg)	So	Corinth HS	Corinth, MS
F	44	Gimel Martinez	6 ft 8 in (2.03 m)	220 lb (100 kg)	So	Miami Senior HS	Miami, FL

Head coach

- Rick Pitino (UMass)

Assistant coach(es)

- Herb Sendek (Carnegie Mellon)
- Billy Donovan (Providence)
- Bernadette Locke-Mattox (Georgia)

Legend

- (C) Team captain
- (S) Suspended
- (I) Ineligible
- (W) Walk-on
- Injured
- Current redshirt

== Schedule and results ==
Date time, TV	Rank^{#}	Opponent^{#}	Result	Record	Site city, state
Regular Season
Nov 20, 1991*	No. 4	West Virginia	W 106–80	1–0	Rupp Arena; Lexington, Kentucky
Nov 22, 1991*	No. 4	Pittsburgh	L 67–85	1–1	Rupp Arena; Lexington, Kentucky
Dec 4, 1991*	No. 14	UMass	W 90–69	2–1	Rupp Arena; Lexington, Kentucky
Dec 7, 1991*	No. 14	vs. No. 9 Indiana; Indiana–Kentucky rivalry	W 76–74	3–1	RCA Dome; Indianapolis, Indiana
Dec 10, 1991*	No. 9	Texas State	W 82–36	4–1	Rupp Arena; Lexington, Kentucky
Dec 12, 1991*	No. 9	vs. Morehead State	W 101–84	5–1	Freedom Hall
Dec 14, 1991*	No. 9	Arizona State	W 94–68	6–1	Rupp Arena; Lexington, Kentucky
Dec 21, 1991*	No. 8	vs. No. 13 Georgia Tech	L 80–81	6–2	The Omni; Atlanta, Georgia
Dec 23, 1991*	No. 17	vs. Ohio	W 73–63	7–2	Riverfront Coliseum; Cincinnati, Ohio
Dec 28, 1991*	No. 17	No. 21 Louisville	W 103–89	8–2	Rupp Arena; Lexington, Kentucky
Jan 2, 1992*	No. 17	Notre Dame	W 91–70	9–2	Rupp Arena; Lexington, Kentucky
Jan 4, 1992	No. 17	at South Carolina	W 80–63	10–2 (1–0)	Carolina Coliseum; Columbia, South Carolina
Jan 7, 1992	No. 15	Georgia	W 78–66	11–2 (2–0)	Rupp Arena; Lexington, Kentucky
Jan 11, 1992	No. 15	Florida	W 81–60	12–2 (3–0)	Rupp Arena; Lexington, Kentucky
Jan 15, 1992	No. 10	at Vanderbilt	W 84–71	13–2 (4–0)	Memorial Gymnasium; Nashville, Tennessee
Jan 18, 1992*	No. 10	Eastern Kentucky	W 85–55	14–2	Rupp Arena; Lexington, Kentucky
Jan 21, 1992	No. 8	at Tennessee	L 85–107	14–3 (4–1)	Thompson-Boling Arena; Knoxville, Tennessee
Jan 25, 1992	No. 8	No. 9 Arkansas	L 88–105	14–4 (4–2)	Rupp Arena; Lexington, Kentucky
Jan 29, 1992	No. 14	Ole Miss	W 95–78	15–4 (5–2)	Rupp Arena; Lexington, Kentucky
Feb 2, 1992; ABC	No. 14	at LSU	L 53–74	15–5 (5–3)	Maravich Assembly Center; Baton Rouge, Louisiana
Feb 8, 1992	No. 19	at Auburn	W 85–67	16–5 (6–3)	Beard-Eaves-Memorial Coliseum; Auburn, Alabama
Feb 12, 1992	No. 19	No. 16 Alabama	W 107–83	17–5 (7–3)	Rupp Arena; Lexington, Kentucky
Feb 15, 1992*; UKTV	No. 19	Western Kentucky	W 93–83	18–5	Rupp Arena; Lexington, Kentucky
Feb 19, 1992	No. 13	at Mississippi State	W 89–84	19–5 (8–3)	Humphrey Coliseum; Starkville, Mississippi
Feb 23, 1992	No. 13	at Georgia	W 84–73	20–5 (9–3)	Stegeman Coliseum; Athens, Georgia
Feb 26, 1992	No. 11	South Carolina	W 74–56	21–5 (10–3)	Rupp Arena; Lexington, Kentucky
Mar 1, 1992	No. 11	Vanderbilt	W 80–56	22–5 (11–3)	Rupp Arena; Lexington, Kentucky
Mar 4, 1992	No. 10	at Florida	L 62–79	22–6 (11–4)	Stephen C. O'Connell Center; Gainesville, Florida
Mar 7, 1992	No. 10	Tennessee	W 99–88	23–6 (12–4)	Rupp Arena; Lexington, Kentucky
SEC Tournament
Mar 13, 1992*; JPS	(2) No. 9	vs. (9) Vanderbilt; Quarterfinals	W 76–57	24–6	Birmingham-Jefferson Civic Center; Birmingham, Alabama
Mar 14, 1992*; JPS	(2) No. 9	vs. (3) No. 23 LSU; Semifinals	W 80–74	25–6	Birmingham-Jefferson Civic Center; Birmingham, Alabama
Mar 15, 1992*; JPS	(2) No. 9	vs. (4) No. 17 Alabama; Championship game	W 80–54	26–6	Birmingham-Jefferson Civic Center; Birmingham, Alabama
NCAA Tournament
Mar 20, 1992*	(2 E) No. 6	vs. (15 E) Old Dominion; First round	W 88–69	27–6	Centrum in Worcester; Worcester, Massachusetts
Mar 22, 1992*	(2 E) No. 6	vs. (10 E) Iowa State; Second round	W 106–98	28–6	Centrum in Worcester; Worcester, Massachusetts
Mar 26, 1992*; CBS	(2 E) No. 6	vs. (3 E) No. 17 UMass; East Regional semifinal – Sweet Sixteen	W 87–77	29–6	The Spectrum; Philadelphia, Pennsylvania
Mar 28, 1992*; CBS	(2 E) No. 6	vs. (1 E) No. 1 Duke; East Regional Final – Elite Eight	L 103–104 ^{OT}	29–7	The Spectrum (17,878); Philadelphia, Pennsylvania
*Non-conference game. ^{#}Rankings from AP poll. (#) Tournament seedings in parentheses.

=== NCAA basketball tournament ===
- East
  - Kentucky (2) 88, Old Dominion (15) 69
  - Kentucky 106, Iowa State (10) 98
  - Kentucky 87, Massachusetts (3) 77
  - Duke (1) 104, Kentucky 103 (OT)

== Team players drafted into the NBA ==
Jamal Mashburn of the Wildcats was claimed in the 1993 NBA draft.
