= 1992 ACC men's basketball tournament =

- Classification: Division I
- Season: 1991–92
- Teams: 9
- Site: Charlotte Coliseum; Charlotte, North Carolina
- Champions: Duke (9th title)
- Winning coach: Mike Krzyzewski (3rd title)
- MVP: Christian Laettner (Duke)
- Television: Raycom-Jefferson Pilot Sports (within ACC footprint) ESPN (outside ACC footprint)

1991–92 ACC men's basketball standings
	Conf.				Overall
Team	W		L	PCT	W		L	PCT
No. 1 Duke †	14	–	2	.875	34	–	2	.944
No. 20 Florida State	11	–	5	.688	22	–	10	.688
No. 18 North Carolina	9	–	7	.563	23	–	10	.697
Georgia Tech	8	–	8	.500	23	–	12	.657
Virginia	8	–	8	.500	20	–	13	.606
Wake Forest	7	–	9	.438	17	–	12	.586
NC State	6	–	10	.375	12	–	18	.400
Maryland	5	–	11	.313	14	–	15	.483
Clemson	4	–	12	.250	14	–	14	.500
† 1992 ACC tournament winner Rankings from AP Poll

The 1992 Atlantic Coast Conference men's basketball tournament took place in Charlotte, North Carolina, at the second Charlotte Coliseum. Duke won the tournament, defeating North Carolina, 94–74, in the championship game. Christian Laettner of Duke was named tournament MVP. Florida State played in the ACC Tournament for the first time. The expansion to nine teams forced the addition of what would eventually become known as the "Les Robinson Invitational" because of NC State's multiple appearances in the Thursday game under coach Les Robinson. The 1992 tournament was the only time under Robinson the Wolfpack did not participate in the new "first-round" game.

== Bracket ==
First round March 12
8	Maryland	81
9	Clemson	75

Quarterfinals; March 13
1	#1 Duke	94
8	Maryland	87
4	Georgia Tech	68
5	Virginia	56
2	#18 Florida State	93
7	NC State	80
3	#20 North Carolina	80
6	Wake Forest	65

Semifinals; March 14
1	#1 Duke	89
4	Georgia Tech	76
2	#18 Florida State	76
3	#20 North Carolina	80

Championship Game; March 15
1	#1 Duke	94
3	#20 North Carolina	74

AP rankings at time of tournament
