= The Shot (Duke–Kentucky) =

Collegiate basketball game

1992 NCAA tournament East Regional Final
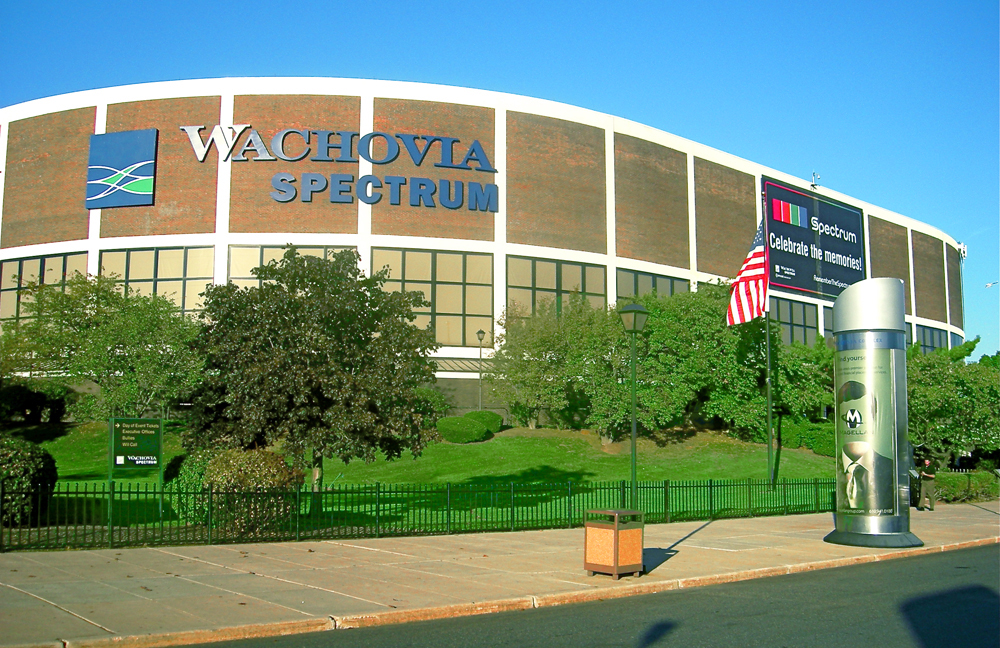
- The Spectrum in 2008
Kentucky Wildcats	Duke Blue Devils
(29–6)	(32–2)
103	104
Head coach: Rick Pitino	Head coach: Mike Krzyzewski
- AP: 6
- Coaches: 9
- AP: 1
- Coaches: 1
	1st half	2nd half	OT	Total
Kentucky Wildcats	45	48	10	103
Duke Blue Devils	50	43	11	104
- Date: March 28, 1992
- Venue: The Spectrum, Philadelphia, Pennsylvania
- Referees: Tim Higgins, Charles Range, Tom Clark
- Attendance: 17,848

United States TV coverage
- Network: CBS
- Announcers: Verne Lundquist (play by play) Len Elmore (color), and Lesley Visser (sideline)

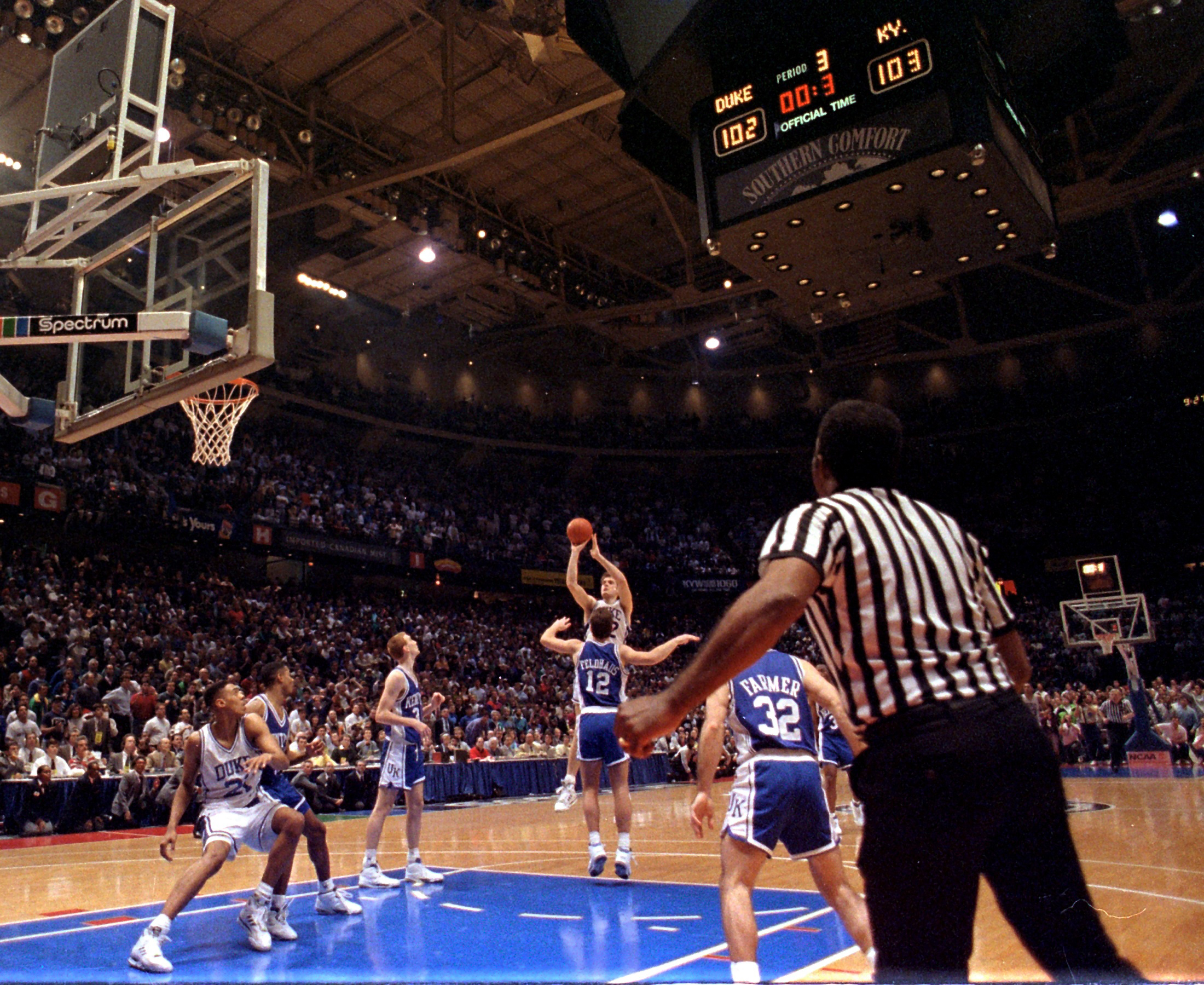
Laettner puts up the shot with .3 seconds on the clock. Photo by Joseph Rodriguez, News & Record Staff Photographer

The 1992 NCAA tournament was highlighted by a game between #1 seed Duke and #2 seed Kentucky in the East Region final to determine a spot in the Final Four. With 2.1 seconds remaining in overtime, defending national champion Duke trailed 103–102. Grant Hill threw a pass three-quarters of the length of the court to Christian Laettner, who faked right, dribbled once, turned, and hit a jumper as time expired for the 104–103 win. In 2004 Sports Illustrated deemed it the greatest college basketball game of all time, and ESPN included it as number 17 on its list of top 100 sports moments of the past 25 years (see ESPN25). It is ranked number one on the list of the greatest NCAA tournament games of all time compiled by USA Today in 2002.

== Background and legacy ==
=== Kentucky Wildcats ===
The 1991–92 team is one of the most revered in the University of Kentucky's (UK) long basketball history. The Wildcats were coming off a two-year postseason ban due to major recruiting violations committed during the tenure of coach Rick Pitino's predecessor Eddie Sutton, although the NCAA found Sutton was not personally liable. The violations mainly centered on alleged cheating by former player Eric Manuel on the ACT college entrance exam and cash payments to the guardian of another former player, Chris Mills. This was notoriously highlighted on the cover of Sports Illustrated called "Kentucky's Shame".

The team's four seniors, three of whom were Kentucky natives, had remained loyal to the program throughout its probation, and would enter Kentucky basketball history as "The Unforgettables". They were:

- Richie Farmer, a 6'0"/1.83 m shooting guard from Manchester, a small town in the state's eastern coal fields. (He served as the Kentucky Commissioner of Agriculture from 2004 to 2012, and was the Republican nominee for Lieutenant Governor of Kentucky in 2011, and would later serve two years in federal prison after pleading guilty to multiple corruption charges during his tenure as Agriculture Commissioner.)
- Deron Feldhaus, a 6'7"/2.01 m forward from Maysville, a small Ohio River town in the Bluegrass region, about an hour's drive upriver from Cincinnati.
- John Pelphrey, a 6'8"/2.03 m forward from another eastern coal town, Paintsville (currently the head coach at Tennessee Tech, and former assistant at Florida and former head coach at Arkansas).
- Sean Woods, the only non-Kentuckian, a 6'2"/1.88 m point guard from Indianapolis (formerly the head coach at Morehead State).

Although the seniors were central to the team, sophomore Jamal Mashburn was the leading scorer, who became a consensus first-team All-American the following season and had a successful 12-year NBA career. He is now a college basketball analyst for TNT Sports.

The legacy of "The Unforgettables" at UK was great enough that the UK program decided to retire their jerseys (but not their numbers) almost immediately after that game. While jersey retirement is not uncommon, it is rare for a school to bestow this honor so soon after a player's career ends.

=== Duke Blue Devils ===
Duke entered the 1991–92 season having just won their first ever national championship the previous year and looking to repeat as national champions for the first time since UCLA in 1972 and 1973. They were favored to do so, losing only Greg Koubek and Clay Buckley to graduation and Billy McCaffrey and Crawford Palmer to transfers while retaining their core players including center Christian Laettner, point guard Bobby Hurley and guard/forward Grant Hill and adding recruits Cherokee Parks and Erik Meek to its lineup.

The Blue Devils started the season ranked No. 1 and won their first 17 games. Their unbeaten streak came to an end when they lost a close contest to archrival North Carolina at the Dean Smith Center by a score of 75–73. However, Duke would only lose one other game (to Wake Forest 72–68 in Winston-Salem) for the rest of the season and finished the season with a 25–2 record and the 10th regular-season championship in school history, entering the ACC tournament as the No. 1 seed and defeating North Carolina in the ACC title game 94–74 to capture their 9th ACC tournament championship in school history.

Following this game, Duke successfully concluded their quest to repeat at the Final Four in Minneapolis after first overcoming Indiana 81–78 in Bob Knight's last Final Four appearance as Hoosiers head coach and then sweeping past Michigan, led by the Fab Five, 71–51. In doing so, they also completed a wire-to-wire season ranked #1. Laettner was also the only collegiate player to be named on the 1992 United States men's Olympic team, also known as the Dream Team, which Duke coach Mike Krzyzewski served on as an assistant under Detroit Pistons head coach Chuck Daly before taking the helm from 2006 to 2016.

== Route to the game ==
#1 Duke Blue Devils		Round	#2 Kentucky Wildcats
Opponent	Result	East Regional	Opponent	Result
#16 Campbell Camels	Win 82–56	First round	#15 Old Dominion Monarchs	Win 88–69
#9 Iowa Hawkeyes	Win 75–62	Second Round	#10 Iowa State Cyclones	Win 108–96
#4 Seton Hall Pirates	Win 81–69	Regional semifinals	#3 Massachusetts Minutemen	Win 87–77

== The game ==
Played at The Spectrum in Philadelphia, the game between Kentucky and Duke is considered by some to be the greatest NCAA tournament game ever, being close for the entire 40 minutes plus the 5 minute overtime.

At the end of the first half, Duke led Kentucky 50–45. With about eight minutes left in the second half, after Aminu Timberlake was knocked down during a play, Laettner stepped on his chest. Laettner was assessed a technical foul, but was not ejected. Kentucky tied the game at 93 with 33.6 seconds left in regulation on a Feldhaus putback of a Pelphrey miss. Hurley had a chance to win the game as time expired, but he missed the shot and the game went into overtime.

The teams traded the lead through the overtime period. After Kentucky pulled ahead 98–96, Laettner took over for the Blue Devils, scoring their final six points and giving them a 102–101 lead. After Kentucky called a timeout with 7.8 seconds left, Woods hit a running one-hander in the lane over Laettner to put Kentucky ahead 103–102 with 2.1 seconds remaining.

Duke called a timeout and drew up the final play where Hill would throw a long pass to Laettner at the opposing foul line. They had practiced the play and run it once before in their earlier loss against Wake Forest, but Hill's pass was off target to the left and Laettner was unable to catch it inbounds. Unlike against Wake Forest, Hill was not guarded on the inbounds pass as Kentucky elected to eschew guarding Hill in favor of pitting an extra defender on Laettner. Hill's 79-foot pass found Laettner at the opposite foul line, and Laettner dribbled once to his right, then turned back to his left and shot a turnaround jumper over Feldhaus just before time expired. The ball swished through the net as the buzzer sounded, giving Duke a 104–103 victory. Laettner finished the game with 31 points and 7 rebounds. He was a perfect 10–10 from the field (including one three-pointer) and 10–10 from the free throw line.

After the game, Krzyzewski both consoled Farmer and visited the Kentucky radio booth, where Cawood Ledford had called his last game with Kentucky having been knocked out, and congratulated the Wildcats. Krzyzewski and a number of the 1992 team members including Laettner and Hill later retold and successfully reenacted the play in front of an audience at Duke's Legends Weekend in 1996 at Cameron Indoor Stadium in Durham.

== The calls ==
There's the pass to Laettner...puts it up...(Buzzer sounds) Yes!

— Verne Lundquist on CBS's TV broadcast

Here's the long pass then. Laettner's got it, puts down a dribble, turns for the jumper – good! And Duke wins it, 104–103. That's why they're #1.

— Cawood Ledford on the Kentucky radio broadcast

External videos
- The final play of the game, as broadcast by CBS on YouTube
- Full game broadcast by CBS on YouTube

All right, uh, Grant Hill will make the inbounds play, so that takes care of that option. Tony Lang and Thomas Hill are in the backcourt to accept the pass. Bobby Hurley up the floor with Laettner. They throw it the length of the floor – Laettner catches, comes down, dribbles, shoots, scores! Christian Laettner has hit the bucket at the buzzer! The Blue Devils win it 104–103! Look out, Minneapolis, here come the Blue Devils!

— Bob Harris on the Duke radio broadcast on the Capitol Sports Network

== Box score ==
CBS

March 28, 1992

1st Box score
2nd Box score

#1 Duke Blue Devils 104, #2 Kentucky Wildcats 103 (OT)
Scoring by half: 50–45, 43–48 Overtime: 11–10
Pts: Christian Laettner 31; Rebs: Grant Hill 10; Asts: Bobby Hurley 10	Pts: Jamal Mashburn 29; Rebs: Jamal Mashburn 10; Asts: Sean Woods 7

The Spectrum, Philadelphia, Pennsylvania
Attendance: 17,848
Referees: Tim Higgins, Charles Range, and Tom Clark

== Aftermath ==
As a result of the shot, Duke would go on to advance to their fifth straight Final Four and would go on to repeat as national champions under Head Coach Mike Krzyzewski. Krzyzewski and the Blue Devils would become the first program since John Wooden and the UCLA Bruins to advance to five straight Final Fours in men's basketball.

Despite the loss, the Kentucky Wildcats men's basketball team would go on to win the national championship 4 years later in 1996 with Pitino at the helm. Two years later they would secure a national championship again, this time under Head Coach Tubby Smith.
