= Christian Laettner =

American basketball player (born 1969)

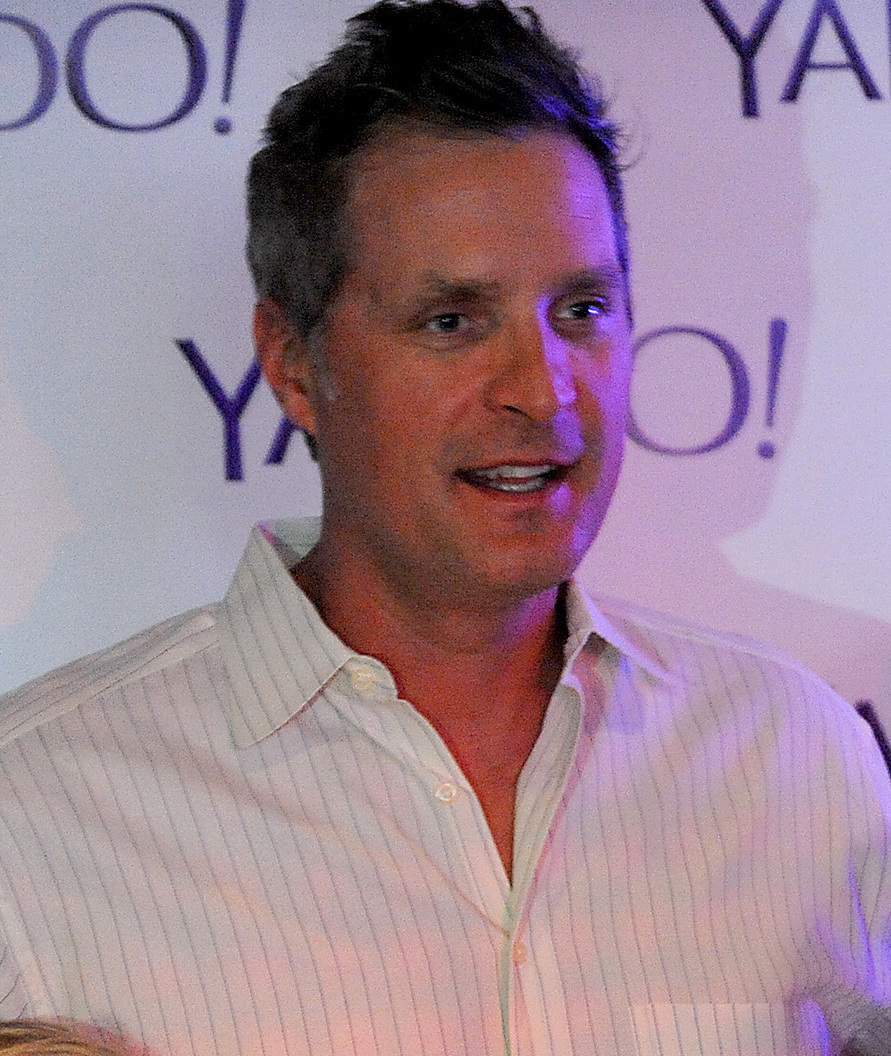
- Laettner in 2014

Personal information
- Born: August 17, 1969 (age 57) Angola, New York, U.S.
- Listed height: 6 ft 11 in (2.11 m)
- Listed weight: 245 lb (111 kg)

Career information
- High school: Nichols School (Buffalo, New York)
- College: Duke (1988–1992)
- NBA draft: 1992: 1st round, 3rd overall pick
- Drafted by: Minnesota Timberwolves
- Playing career: 1992–2005
- Position: Power forward / center
- Number: 32, 44

Career history

Playing
- 1992–1996: Minnesota Timberwolves
- 1996–1998: Atlanta Hawks
- 1999–2000: Detroit Pistons
- 2000–2001: Dallas Mavericks
- 2001–2004: Washington Wizards
- 2004–2005: Miami Heat

Career highlights
- NBA All-Star (1997); NBA All-Rookie First Team (1993); 2× NCAA champion (1991, 1992); NCAA Final Four Most Outstanding Player (1991); National college player of the year (1992); Consensus first-team All-American (1992); Consensus second-team All-American (1991); ACC Player of the Year (1992); 2× ACC Athlete of the Year (1991, 1992); 2× First-team All-ACC (1991, 1992); Second-team All-ACC (1990); No. 32 retired by Duke Blue Devils; USA Basketball Male Athlete of the Year (1991); McDonald's All-American (1988); Second-team Parade All-American (1988); Third-team Parade All-American (1987)

Career NBA statistics
- Points: 11,121 (12.8 ppg)
- Rebounds: 5,806 (6.7 rpg)
- Assists: 2,224 (2.6 apg)
- Stats at NBA.com
- Stats at Basketball Reference
- Collegiate Basketball Hall of Fame
Medals
Men's basketball
Representing the United States
Olympic Games
Gold medal – first place	1992 Barcelona	Team competition
World Championship
Bronze medal – third place	1990 Argentina	Team competition
FIBA Americas Championship
Gold medal – first place	1992 Portland	Team competition
Silver medal – second place	1989 Mexico City	Team competition
Pan American Games
Bronze medal – third place	1991 Havana	Team competition
Goodwill Games
Silver medal – second place	1990 Seattle	Team competition

Christian Donald Laettner (/ˈleɪtnər/, LAYT-nər; born August 17, 1969) is an American former professional basketball player. His college career for the Duke Blue Devils is widely regarded as one of the best in National Collegiate Athletic Association (NCAA) history. (Note: As stated by Jalen Rose, Gene Wojciechowski, Jay Bilas, and others.) He was the star player on back-to-back Duke National Championship teams of 1991 and 1992, and the NCAA player of the year in his senior year. He is famous for his game-winning shot against Kentucky in the 1992 tournament and being polarizing amongst basketball fans.

Laettner was the only collegian selected for the 1992 United States men's Olympic basketball team, dubbed the "Dream Team", that won the gold medal at the 1992 Summer Olympics. As a member of the "Dream Team", Laettner is enshrined in the Naismith Memorial Basketball Hall of Fame, U.S. Olympic Hall of Fame, and FIBA Hall of Fame, while he is enshrined for his individual career in the College Basketball Hall of Fame. He was drafted third overall by the Minnesota Timberwolves in the 1992 NBA draft, then played 13 seasons in the National Basketball Association (NBA) for six teams, being named as an All-Star in 1997.

== Early life ==
Christian Laettner was born and raised in Angola, New York, near Buffalo and Niagara Falls, to a blue-collar Roman Catholic family. His father George, a newspaper press plant printer, was of Polish descent and his grandparents spoke Polish as their first language while his mother Bonnie was a teacher. Christian's older brother Christopher was a strong influence, often bullying young Christian, which helped instill a stern competitive drive. Both boys also frequently worked as farm laborers to supplement their allowance.

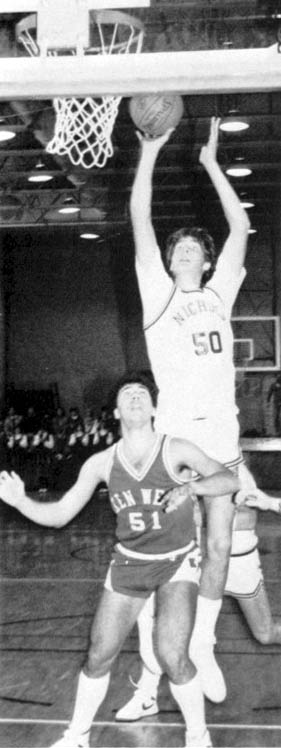
Laettner making a lay-up as a sophomore at Nichols School

Laettner attended the private Nichols School. Although he received a financial aid package that paid a substantial part of his tuition, his family had to sacrifice to send him there and he also did janitorial work at the school to defray some of the cost. (Note: According to Wojciechowski, "He was, in all probability, the poorest student at the school and almost certainly the only one whose parents ordered his clothes from the Sears catalog, which was the one place they could find pants that fit his growing frame.") During his career he scored over 2,000 points, breaking the school record set by teammate Ron Torgalski, and the team won two state titles and reached another semifinal. He was the second player from Western New York to reach 2,000 points, falling short of Curtis Aiken's total of 2,162 set five years earlier. He was a much sought-after college recruit. (Note: As a freshman, Laettner received his first recruiting letter from nearby St. Bonaventure University. The following year, he became a national recruit, sought after by virtually every major Division I program. He initially narrowed his list to 11 schools and eventually decided he preferred the brand of basketball played in the Atlantic Coast Conference (ACC). By his senior year, he decided he would make only three official visits—to Duke, North Carolina and Virginia.)

In 2009 as The Buffalo News celebrated 50 years of All-Western New York (WNY) basketball selections, Laettner, who was twice an All-WNY first team selection was named to the 1980s All-WNY first team along with Aiken, Gary Bossert, Keith Robinson and Ritchie Campbell He was a first team selection for the All-time All-WNY team along with Aiken, Paul Harris, Bob Lanier and Mel Montgomery.

== College career ==
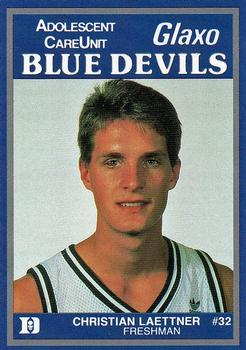
A basketball card of Laettner from the 1988–89 season

Laettner attended Duke University and played for the basketball team from 1988 to 1992 under coach Mike Krzyzewski. As the team's star player his final two seasons, he led the Blue Devils to the first two national titles in school history. (Note: Duke was the first repeat champion since UCLA in 1973 and remains one of three teams, along with Florida in 2007 and Connecticut in 2024, to defend its title after the NCAA tournament expanded to six rounds in 1985.) A four-year starter, he also contributed to their runner-up finish his sophomore year and Final Four appearance in his freshman year. (Note: earning the distinction of being one of only four players (including teammates Greg Koubek and Brian Davis) to play in four consecutive final fours, while being the only one to start every game.) Thus, in total, he played 23 out of a maximum possible 24 NCAA tournament games, winning 21; both are records.

For his career, Laettner averaged 16.6 points and 7.8 rebounds per game while making almost half of his three-pointers. He scored 21.5 points per game his senior season, garnering every major national player of the year award; Duke retired his No. 32 jersey later that year. His career is widely regarded as among the best in college history, and he is enshrined in the National Collegiate Basketball Hall of Fame.

=== NCAA tournament records ===
- Most points scored: 407
- Most free throws made: 142
- Most free throw attempts: 167

=== Clutch performances ===
Laettner had several clutch performances in the NCAA tournament. His most famous was the 1992 regional final against Kentucky, which was foreshadowed by the 1990 regional final against UConn; in both games Duke trailed by one point with two seconds remaining in overtime before Laettner made a jumper as time expired. He also swished the game-winning free throws against undefeated and heavily favored UNLV in the 1991 semifinal, which avenged UNLV's 30-point victory in the 1990 final. He then led Duke to its first championship, defeating Kansas in the final, and was selected as the tournament's most outstanding player.

In the 1992 East Regional Final, a game many critics rate among the greatest in college basketball history, Laettner hit a game-winning, buzzer-beating turn-around jumper that has since become known as simply The Shot. Over the course of the game, he shot a perfect ten of ten field goals and ten of ten free throws for 31 points. He then finished his college career by leading Duke to its second consecutive national title. The following year ESPN awarded him both "Outstanding Performance Under Pressure" and "College Basketball Play of the Year" for the Kentucky game, also awarding him "Outstanding College Basketball Performer of the Year".

The game-winning shot against Kentucky became a cultural icon, having been frequently televised in college basketball montages. Several companies have also featured it in their commercials. (Note: including those of Allstate in 2003 and Laettner's reenactment for Vitamin Water in 2009) In 2006 The Best Damn Sports Show Period ranked it the fifth most memorable moment in sports history.

=== Widely reviled ===
Laettner was widely reviled by opposing fans throughout his career, to the extent that more than 20 years after graduating from Duke, he was voted the most hated college basketball player in history in an ESPN online poll. This led to ESPN's creation of the 30 for 30 documentary I Hate Christian Laettner that explored five factors that the filmmakers believe explain this widespread and persistent hatred: race, privilege, bullying, greatness, and physical appearance. He was particularly resented for stepping on the chest of Kentucky player Aminu Timberlake during the 1992 regional final, which the referees deemed a technical foul; Laettner expressed regret for his misconduct but believed that ejection would have been too harsh a consequence.

== Professional career ==
Selected third overall in 1992 NBA draft by the Minnesota Timberwolves, (Note: after Shaquille O'Neal and Alonzo Mourning; incidentally all three would be teammates on the Miami Heat during Laettner's final season) Laettner played 13 years in the NBA, from 1992 to 2005, scoring 11,121 points and grabbing 5,806 rebounds. He played for the Minnesota Timberwolves, Atlanta Hawks, Detroit Pistons, Dallas Mavericks, Washington Wizards, and Miami Heat. His first six seasons were his best, averaging 16.6 points and 7.9 rebounds per game while starting almost all of them. He also was selected to the All-Rookie First Team in 1993 and the All-Star Game in 1997 while with the Atlanta Hawks, having been traded to Atlanta in 1996 alongside Sean Rooks in exchange for Spud Webb and Andrew Lang. His time on the Hawks was his most successful NBA team experience, twice reaching the second round of the playoffs.

Despite his achievements, Laettner's NBA career was characterized by relative transience. He played for six different teams, was traded six times, and never spent more than four full seasons anywhere. In 2004, he was suspended for several games for using marijuana.

He appeared in a total of 868 regular-season games, averaging 12.8 points, 6.7 rebounds, and 2.6 assists per game through the entirety of his career.

== National team career ==
As the national player of the year, Laettner was the only collegian selected for the prestigious "Dream Team" that won the 1992 Olympic gold medal in a dominant fashion. He averaged 4.8 points per game. The team is considered one of the greatest in sports history and was inducted into the U.S. Olympic Hall of Fame, FIBA Hall of Fame, and the Naismith Memorial Basketball Hall of Fame.

== Post-NBA basketball ==
Laettner maintains a close friendship with Duke teammate Brian Davis. They have pursued several business ventures together, including real-estate development in Durham, a Major League Soccer team, and an unsuccessful attempt to purchase the Memphis Grizzlies. Some legal problems, primarily regarding unpaid debts, have also occurred. In 2010, Laettner was enshrined in the Naismith Memorial Basketball Hall of Fame as a member of the 1992 Dream Team. Laettner is the only player of the team who has not been inducted into the Hall of Fame individually.

Since 2011 he has operated numerous youth basketball training camps. He also played one season in a semi-pro league and briefly served as an assistant coach in the NBA Development League. For The Z Team, an Olympic Channel reality show that has former Olympic athletes help struggling sports teams, he worked with the Garinger High School boys basketball team for a week.

== Personal life ==
Laettner lives in Ponte Vedra Beach, Florida, and is an avid muskellunge fisherman.

He is divorced with three children.

Laettner has donated large sums to his alma maters. (Note: $1 million to Nichols School to create a scholarship fund for students in financial need and to aid in the completion of a new gymnasium and, in partnership with Brian Davis, $2 million to Duke's men's basketball program to endow an athletic scholarship and support construction of an athletics center and practice facility.)

== Career statistics ==
Legend
GP	Games played	GS	Games started	MPG	Minutes per game
FG%	Field goal percentage	3P%	3-point field goal percentage	FT%	Free throw percentage
RPG	Rebounds per game	APG	Assists per game	SPG	Steals per game
BPG	Blocks per game	PPG	Points per game	**Bold**	Career high
*	Led the league

=== NBA ===
==== Regular season ====
Year	Team	GP	GS	MPG	FG%	3P%	FT%	RPG	APG	SPG	BPG	PPG
1992–93	Minnesota	81	81	34.9	.474	.100	.835	8.7	2.8	**1.3**	1.0	**18.2**
1993–94	Minnesota	70	67	34.7	.448	.240	.783	8.6	**4.4**	1.2	**1.2**	16.8
1994–95	Minnesota	81	80	34.2	.489	.325	.818	7.6	2.9	1.2	1.1	16.3
1995–96	Minnesota	44	44	34.5	.486	.290	.816	6.9	2.9	.9	1.0	18.0
1995–96	Atlanta	30	27	32.6	.489	.000	.823	7.9	2.3	1.0	.9	14.2
1996–97	Atlanta	**82**	**82***	**38.3**	.486	**.352**	.816	**8.8**	2.7	1.2	.8	18.1
1997–98	Atlanta	74	49	30.8	.485	.222	.864	6.6	2.6	1.0	1.0	13.8
1998–99	Detroit	16	0	21.1	.358	.333	.772	3.4	1.5	.9	.8	7.6
1999–00	Detroit	**82**	**82***	29.8	.473	.292	.812	6.7	2.3	1.0	.5	12.2
2000–01	Dallas	53	35	17.5	.511	.333	.817	4.0	1.3	.8	.5	7.5
2000–01	Washington	25	13	29.3	.491	.300	.844	6.1	2.3	1.2	.8	13.2
2001–02	Washington	57	48	25.3	.464	.200	**.868**	5.3	2.6	1.1	.4	7.1
2002–03	Washington	76	66	29.1	.494	.125	.833	6.6	3.1	1.1	.5	8.3
2003–04	Washington	48	18	20.5	.465	.286	.800	4.8	1.9	.8	.6	5.9
2004–05	Miami	49	0	15.1	**.582**	.143	.763	2.7	.8	.7	.3	5.3
Career		868	692	29.7	.480	.261	.820	6.7	2.6	1.1	.8	12.8
All-Star		1	0	24.0	.600	—	1.000	11.0	2.0	1.0	1.0	7.0

==== Playoffs ====
Year	Team	GP	GS	MPG	FG%	3P%	FT%	RPG	APG	SPG	BPG	PPG
1996	Atlanta	10	**10**	33.4	.484	**.333**	.704	6.9	1.5	1.2	**1.0**	15.7
1997	Atlanta	10	**10**	**40.3**	.418	.190	.857	**7.2**	**2.6**	1.0	.8	**17.6**
1998	Atlanta	4	0	21.8	.343	.000	**.882**	4.3	1.0	**1.5**	.3	9.8
1999	Detroit	5	0	24.6	.426	—	.786	2.8	2.2	.8	.2	10.2
2000	Detroit	3	3	25.0	.412	—	.750	5.0	2.0	.0	.3	6.7
2005	Miami	**13**	0	10.5	**.500**	.000	.833	1.9	.5	.3	.0	2.2
Career		45	23	25.7	.432	.179	.794	4.7	1.5	.8	.5	10.5

=== College ===
Year	Team	GP	GS	MPG	FG%	3P%	FT%	RPG	APG	SPG	BPG	PPG
1988–89	Duke	36	16	16.9	.723	1.000	.727	4.7	1.2	1.0	.8	8.9
1989–90	Duke	38	38	29.9	.511	.500	.836	9.6	2.2	1.6	1.1	16.3
1990–91	Duke	39	39	30.2	.575	.340	.802	8.7	1.9	1.9	1.1	19.8
1991–92	Duke	35	35	32.2	.575	.557	.815	7.9	2.0	2.1	.9	21.5
Career		148	128	27.4	.574	.485	.806	7.8	1.8	1.6	1.0	16.6

== Awards and honors ==
NBA

- NBA All-Star (1997)
- NBA All-Rookie First Team (1993)

USA Basketball

- Summer Olympics gold medal winner (1992)
- Pan American Games bronze medal winner (1991)
- FIBA World Championship bronze medal winner (1990)
- Tournament of the Americas gold medal winner (1992)
- Tournament of the Americas silver medal winner (1989)
- Goodwill Games silver medal winner (1990)

NCAA

- 2× NCAA champion (1991, 1992)
- NCAA Final Four Most Outstanding Player (1991)
- Consensus National College Player of the Year (1992)
- Consensus first-team All-American (1992)
- Consensus second-team All-American (1991)
- 2× NCAA final Four All-Tournament Team) (1991, 1992)
- ACC Player of the Year (1992)
- ACC Player of the Year (1992)
- 2× ACC Athlete of the Year (1991, 1992)
- 2× First-team All-ACC (1991, 1992)
- Second-team All-ACC (1990)
- ACC tournament MVP 1992
- Oscar Robertson Trophy (1992)
- NABC Player of the Year (1992)
- NABC Player of the Year (1992)
- John R. Wooden Award (1992)
- Naismith College Player of the Year (1992)
- No. 32 jersey retired by Duke in 1992

Media

- Sporting News College Player of the Year (1992)
- AP College Basketball Player of the Year (1992)

Halls of Fame

- Naismith Memorial Basketball Hall of Fame (class of 2010 as a member of the "Dream Team")
- U.S. Olympic Hall of Fame (class of 2009 as a member of the "Dream Team")
- FIBA Hall of Fame (class of 2017 as a member of the "Dream Team")
- College Basketball Hall of Fame (class of 2010)
- National Polish-American Sports Hall of Fame (class of 2008)

== See also ==
- List of NCAA Division I men's basketball players with 2,000 points and 1,000 rebounds
- List of NCAA Division I men's basketball career games played leaders
- List of NCAA Division I men's basketball career free throw scoring leaders
