= 1991–92 Duke Blue Devils men's basketball team =

American college basketball season

1991–92 Duke Blue Devils men's basketball

NCAA tournament National Champions NCAA Dvision I regular season champions ACC tournament champions ACC regular season champions

National Championship Game, W 71–51 vs. Michigan
- Conference: Atlantic Coast Conference

Ranking
- Coaches: No. 1
- AP: No. 1
- Record: 34–2 (14–2 ACC)
- Head coach: Mike Krzyzewski (12th season)
- Assistant coaches: Pete Gaudet; Mike Brey; Tommy Amaker; Jay Bilas
- Home arena: Cameron Indoor Stadium

1991–92 ACC men's basketball standings
	Conf.				Overall
Team	W		L	PCT	W		L	PCT
No. 1 Duke †	14	–	2	.875	34	–	2	.944
No. 20 Florida State	11	–	5	.688	22	–	10	.688
No. 18 North Carolina	9	–	7	.563	23	–	10	.697
Georgia Tech	8	–	8	.500	23	–	12	.657
Virginia	8	–	8	.500	20	–	13	.606
Wake Forest	7	–	9	.438	17	–	12	.586
NC State	6	–	10	.375	12	–	18	.400
Maryland	5	–	11	.313	14	–	15	.483
Clemson	4	–	12	.250	14	–	14	.500
† 1992 ACC tournament winner Rankings from AP Poll

The 1991–92 Duke Blue Devils men's basketball team was a Division I college basketball team that competed in the Atlantic Coast Conference. Led by All-American Christian Laettner and Grant Hill, Duke won its second national championship in as many years, to become the first repeating team since UCLA's seven-year dynasty from 1967 to 1973. The feat would not be accomplished again in college basketball until the Florida Gators did it in 2007.

== Roster ==
1991–92 Duke Blue Devils men's basketball team
Players
Coaches

Pos.	#	Name	Height	Weight	Year	Previous school	Hometown
SG	3	Marty Clark	6 ft 6 in (1.98 m)	200 lb (91 kg)	So	St. Joseph	Westchester, Illinois
SG	4	Kenny Blakeney	6 ft 4 in (1.93 m)	190 lb (86 kg)	So	DeMatha	Washington, D.C.
PG	5	Ron Burt (W)	6 ft 0 in (1.83 m)	165 lb (75 kg)	Sr	Gould Academy	Kansas City, Missouri
PG	11	Bobby Hurley	6 ft 2 in (1.88 m)	165 lb (75 kg)	Jr	St. Anthony's	Jersey City, New Jersey
SG	12	Thomas Hill	6 ft 5 in (1.96 m)	200 lb (91 kg)	Jr	Lancaster	Lancaster, Texas
SF	21	Antonio Lang	6 ft 8 in (2.03 m)	215 lb (98 kg)	So	LeFlore	Mobile, AL
SG	23	Brian Davis (C)	6 ft 7 in (2.01 m)	195 lb (88 kg)	Sr	Bladensburg	Capitol Heights, Maryland
C	32	Christian Laettner (C)	6 ft 11 in (2.11 m)	235 lb (107 kg)	Sr	Nichols	Angola, New York
SF	33	Grant Hill	6 ft 8 in (2.03 m)	225 lb (102 kg)	So	South Lakes	Reston, Virginia
PF	44	Cherokee Parks	6 ft 11 in (2.11 m)	235 lb (107 kg)	Fr	Marina	Huntington Beach, California
C	52	Erik Meek	6 ft 10 in (2.08 m)	240 lb (109 kg)	Fr	San Pasqual	Escondido, California
SF	54	Christian Ast	6 ft 8 in (2.03 m)	205 lb (93 kg)	So	High Point	Heidelberg, Germany/Beltsville, Maryland

Head coach

- Mike Krzyzewski

Assistant coach(es)

- Tommy Amaker
- Jay Bilas
- Mike Brey

Legend

- (C) Team captain
- (S) Suspended
- (I) Ineligible
- (W) Walk-on
- Injured
- Current redshirt

Roster
Last update: 2016-Apr-24

== Expectations ==
The Blue Devils started the season as the defending national champions, and were looking to repeat as national champions for the first time since UCLA did it in 1973. Losing only Greg Koubek and Clay Buckley to graduation, along with outgoing transfers Billy McCaffrey and Crawford Palmer, Duke retained its core players including Laettner, Bobby Hurley, and Grant Hill, and added recruits Cherokee Parks and Erik Meek to its lineup.

== Regular season ==
The Blue Devils started the season ranked No. 1, and won its first 17 games. Their unbeaten streak came to an end when they lost a close contest to North Carolina in the Dean Dome by a score of 75–73. However, Duke only lost one other game (to Wake Forest 72–68) for the rest of the season, and finished the season with a 25–2 record and the 10th regular-season championship in school history.

== Conference tournament ==
Duke entered the ACC tournament as the No. 1 seed. They defeated North Carolina in the ACC title game 94–74 to capture their 9th ACC Tournament Championship in school history. As a result, the Blue Devils received a No. 1 seed in the East Regional of the NCAA tournament.

== NCAA tournament ==
The Blue Devils had little trouble progressing through the first three rounds, but faced the toughest test of the season in the East Regional Final against sixth-ranked and No. 2 seed Kentucky coached by Rick Pitino. In perhaps the greatest college basketball game in history, Christian Laettner hit a buzzer-beating turnaround jumper on a long inbounds pass from Grant Hill, and Duke got a 104–103 overtime win over Kentucky to earn its fifth straight Final Four appearance. Laettner scored 31 points in that game, making all 10 of his field goal attempts (including a three-pointer) and all 10 of his free throws.

After defeating an Indiana team led by Calbert Cheaney, Duke reached the title game for the third consecutive time to face off against Michigan's Fab Five, led by freshmen Chris Webber, Jalen Rose, Juwan Howard, Jimmy King and Ray Jackson. The Blue Devils ended the Fab Five's dream run in a 71–51 contest to become the first team since UCLA 19 years ago to repeat as national champions. Bobby Hurley was named NCAA basketball tournament Most Outstanding Player.

== Schedule ==
Date time, TV	Rank^{#}	Opponent^{#}	Result	Record	Site (attendance) city, state
Regular season
November 25, 1991*; 7:30 pm	No. 1	East Carolina	W 103–75	1–0	Cameron Indoor Stadium (9,314); Durham, North Carolina
November 30, 1991*; 7:30 pm	No. 1	Harvard	W 118–65	2–0	Cameron Indoor Stadium (9,314); Durham, North Carolina
December 5, 1991*; 9:00 pm	No. 1	vs. No. 7 St. John's; ACC/Big East Challenge	W 91–81	3–0	Greensboro Coliseum (15,781); Greensboro, North Carolina
December 7, 1991*; 7:30 pm	No. 1	vs. Canisius	W 96–60	4–0	Buffalo Memorial Auditorium (16,729); Buffalo, New York
December 14, 1991*; 3:45 pm	No. 1	at No. 18 Michigan; Rivalry	W 88–85 ^{OT}	5–0	Crisler Arena (13,609); Ann Arbor, Michigan
December 31, 1991*; 7:30 pm	No. 1	William & Mary	W 97–61	6–0	Cameron Indoor Stadium (9,314); Durham, North Carolina
January 2, 1992; 7:30 pm	No. 1	at Virginia	W 68–62	7–0 (1–0)	University Hall (8,864); Charlottesville, Virginia
January 6, 1992; 7:30 pm	No. 1	Florida State	W 86–70	8–0 (2–0)	Cameron Indoor Stadium (9,314); Durham, North Carolina
January 8, 1992; 9:00 pm	No. 1	at Maryland	W 83–66	9–0 (3–0)	Cole Field House (14,500); College Park, Maryland
January 11, 1992; 1:30 pm	No. 1	No. 14 Georgia Tech	W 97–84	10–0 (4–0)	Cameron Indoor Stadium (9,314); Durham, North Carolina
January 15, 1992; 9:00 pm	No. 1	NC State	W 110–75	11–0 (5–0)	Cameron Indoor Stadium (9,314); Durham, North Carolina
January 18, 1992*; 5:00 pm	No. 1	No. 18 UNC Charlotte	W 104–82	12–0	Cameron Indoor Stadium (9,314); Durham, North Carolina
January 21, 1992*; 7:30 pm	No. 1	at Boston University	W 95–85	13–0	Walter Brown Arena (4,108); Boston
January 25, 1992; 2:00 pm	No. 1	Wake Forest	W 84–68	14–0 (6–0)	Cameron Indoor Stadium (9,314); Durham, North Carolina
January 27, 1992; 9:00 pm	No. 1	Clemson	W 112–73	15–0 (7–0)	Cameron Indoor Stadium (9,314); Durham, North Carolina
January 30, 1992; 7:30 pm	No. 1	at No. 23 Florida State	W 75–62	16–0 (8–0)	Tallahassee–Leon County Civic Center (13,610); Tallahassee, Florida
February 1, 1992*; 4:00 pm	No. 1	Notre Dame	W 100–71	17–0	Cameron Indoor Stadium (9,314); Durham, North Carolina
February 5, 1992; 9:00 pm	No. 1	at No. 9 North Carolina	L 73–75	17–1 (8–1)	Dean Smith Center (21,572); Chapel Hill, North Carolina
February 8, 1992*; 2:00 pm	No. 1	at No. 22 LSU	W 77–67	18–1	Pete Maravich Assembly Center (13,846); Baton Rouge, Louisiana
February 12, 1992; 9:00 pm	No. 1	at Georgia Tech	W 71–62	19–1 (9–1)	Alexander Memorial Coliseum (10,026); Atlanta
February 16, 1992; 1:30 pm	No. 1	at North Carolina State	W 71–63	20–1 (10–1)	Reynolds Coliseum (12,400); Raleigh, North Carolina
February 20, 1992; 8:00 pm	No. 1	Maryland	W 91–89	21–1 (11–1)	Cameron Indoor Stadium (9,314); Durham, North Carolina
February 23, 1992; 2:00 pm	No. 1	at Wake Forest	L 68–72	21–2 (11–2)	Lawrence Joel Veterans Memorial Coliseum (14,673); Winston-Salem, North Carolina
February 26, 1992; 9:00 pm	No. 1	Virginia	W 76–67	22–2 (12–2)	Cameron Indoor Stadium (9,314); Durham, North Carolina
March 1, 1992*; 1:00 pm	No. 1	at No. 4 UCLA	W 75–65	23–2	Pauley Pavilion (13,023); Los Angeles
March 4, 1992	No. 1	at Clemson	W 98–97	24–2 (13–2)	Littlejohn Coliseum (11,500); Clemson, South Carolina
March 8, 1992	No. 1	No. 16 North Carolina	W 89–77	25–2 (14–2)	Cameron Indoor Stadium (9,314); Durham, North Carolina
ACC Tournament
March 13, 1992	(1) No. 1	vs. (8) Maryland; Quarterfinals	W 94–87	26–2	Charlotte Coliseum (23,532); Charlotte, North Carolina
March 14, 1992	(1) No. 1	vs. (4) Georgia Tech; Semifinals	W 89–76	27–2	Charlotte Coliseum (23,532); Charlotte, North Carolina
March 15, 1992	(1) No. 1	vs. (3) No. 20 North Carolina; Championship	W 94–74	28–2	Charlotte Coliseum (23,532); Charlotte, North Carolina
NCAA tournament
March 19, 1992*; CBS	(1 E) No. 1	vs. (16 E) Campbell; First Round	W 82–56	29–2	Greensboro Coliseum (15,800); Greensboro, North Carolina
March 21, 1992*; CBS	(1 E) No. 1	vs. (9 E) Iowa; Second Round	W 75–62	30–2	Greensboro Coliseum (15,800); Greensboro, North Carolina
March 26, 1992*; CBS	(1 E) No. 1	vs. (4 E) No. 19 Seton Hall; Sweet Sixteen	W 81–69	31–2	The Spectrum (17,878); Philadelphia
March 28, 1992*; CBS	(1 E) No. 1	vs. (2 E) No. 6 Kentucky; Elite Eight	W 104–103 ^{OT}	32–2	The Spectrum (17,878); Philadelphia, Pennsylvania
April 4, 1992*; CBS	(1 E) No. 1	vs. (2 W) No. 5 Indiana; Final Four	W 81–78	33–2	Hubert H. Humphrey Metrodome (50,379); Minneapolis
April 6, 1992*; CBS	(1 E) No. 1	vs. (6 SW) No. 15 Michigan; NCAA National Championship	W 71–51	34–2	Hubert H. Humphrey Metrodome (50,379); Minneapolis, Minnesota
*Non-conference game. ^{#}Rankings from Coaches' Poll. (#) Tournament seedings in parentheses.

== Accomplishments ==
- 2nd straight national championship (1991–1992)
- 3rd straight appearance in national championship game (1990–1992)
- 5th straight appearance in Final Four (1988–1992)
- Held AP No. 1 ranking from start to finish throughout season (18 polls)
- Christian Laettner received several Player of the Year accolades in 1992:
  - NABC Player of the Year
  - AP National Player of the Year
  - Oscar Robertson Trophy
  - Wooden Award
  - Naismith Award
  - Adolph Rupp Trophy
- Christian Laettner was a unanimous First Team All-American selection.
- Christian Laettner became the only player to start in four consecutive Final Fours. He also played in a record-setting 23 games in the NCAA Tournament. (To break this record, one would have to play in four consecutive championship games.)
- Four players received All-ACC honors:
  - Christian Laettner (1st Team)
  - Grant Hill, Bobby Hurley (2nd Team)
  - Thomas Hill (3rd Team)
- Three players from the 1992 squad (Laettner, Hurley, and Grant Hill) had their jerseys retired by Duke.
- Mike Krzyzewski was named the Naismith College Coach of the Year.
- Christian Laettner was the only college basketball player on the 1992 United States men's Olympic basketball team known as the Dream Team.
- Mike Krzyzewski was also on the Dream Team coaching staff as an assistant.
