= Shaquille (TV series) =

- Starring: Shaquille O'Neal
- Narrated by: Shaquille O'Neal
- Country of origin: United States
- No. of episodes: Six

Production
- Running time: Approx. 24 minutes

Original release
- Network: ESPN
- Release: 2005 – 2005

Shaquille is a 2005 series on ESPN featuring NBA center Shaquille O'Neal. The television show ran six episodes, running before each game of the 2005 Western Conference Finals and before Game One of the NBA Finals. The show ran about 30 minutes.

The television show followed O'Neal on and off the court. He discussed his thoughts on former teammate Kobe Bryant, his determination on winning an NBA championship with his first season on the Miami Heat, and more.

The ratings of the mini-series were so high that a DVD of the original six episodes was released on January 31, 2006, titled Shaq TV: The Reality Series.

== Episodes ==
1. Shaq settles into his new life in Miami and sets out to win an NBA championship with his new team. The team’s first road trip is chronicled and includes an exclusive interview with Shaq regarding his career, relationship with the Rockets, and former teammate Kobe Bryant. Shaq returns to Los Angeles for a Christmas Day showdown with his former team and a special family night with his wife and kids.
2. Shaq and the Miami Heat head out on a West Coast road trip. Shaq meets with Nike representatives and gets a sneak peek at his latest line of footwear and visits with a special friend who is battling cancer. Shaq also gives a rare and revealing look at his life on the road and spends a day off in Phoenix and visits old friends at his favorite barbershop. The show also goes behind the scenes of a big-budget commercial starring Shaq and ride along with him as he serves as the grand marshal of the City of Miami Beach Parade. Shaq also films another commercial that provides a great deal of comic relief.
3. Shaq returns once again to Los Angeles. This time he has some fun-time with his kids and visits old friends at his favorite barbershop. We also go behind the scenes of a big budget commercial starring Shaq and ride along with him as he serves as the grand marshal of a City of Miami Beach Parade. Shaq also films another commercial that provides a great deal of comic relief.
4. As the Miami Heat and Shaq continue their push towards a championship, Shaq gets a little down time at home with his wife and kids. Shaq goes up against Yao Ming, LeBron James and Dirk Nowitzki and helps push the Heat to the best record in their division. Exclusive access to team practices gives a revealing inside look at the passion and power of Shaquille O'Neal.
5. Shaq and the Heat square off against the powerhouse Spurs and he goes head to head with All-Star Tim Duncan. Shaq’s wife and kids create a Valentine’s Day surprise for him, and he gives viewers a unique look into the business side of his career. Shaq also spends a romantic night out with his wife and has some fun getting razzed by his teammates during a free-throw competition in practice.
6. Shaq packs up and heads to Denver for his 12th NBA All-Star appearance. Viewers get an all-access pass to this star-studded event as Shaq spends four days in the mile-high city practicing with the league's elite players, putting on charity events and entertaining the fans as well as the media. Shaq returns home and continues his dedicated quest to bring the championship to Miami.
