= Shaquille O'Neal =

American former basketball player and sports analyst (born 1972)

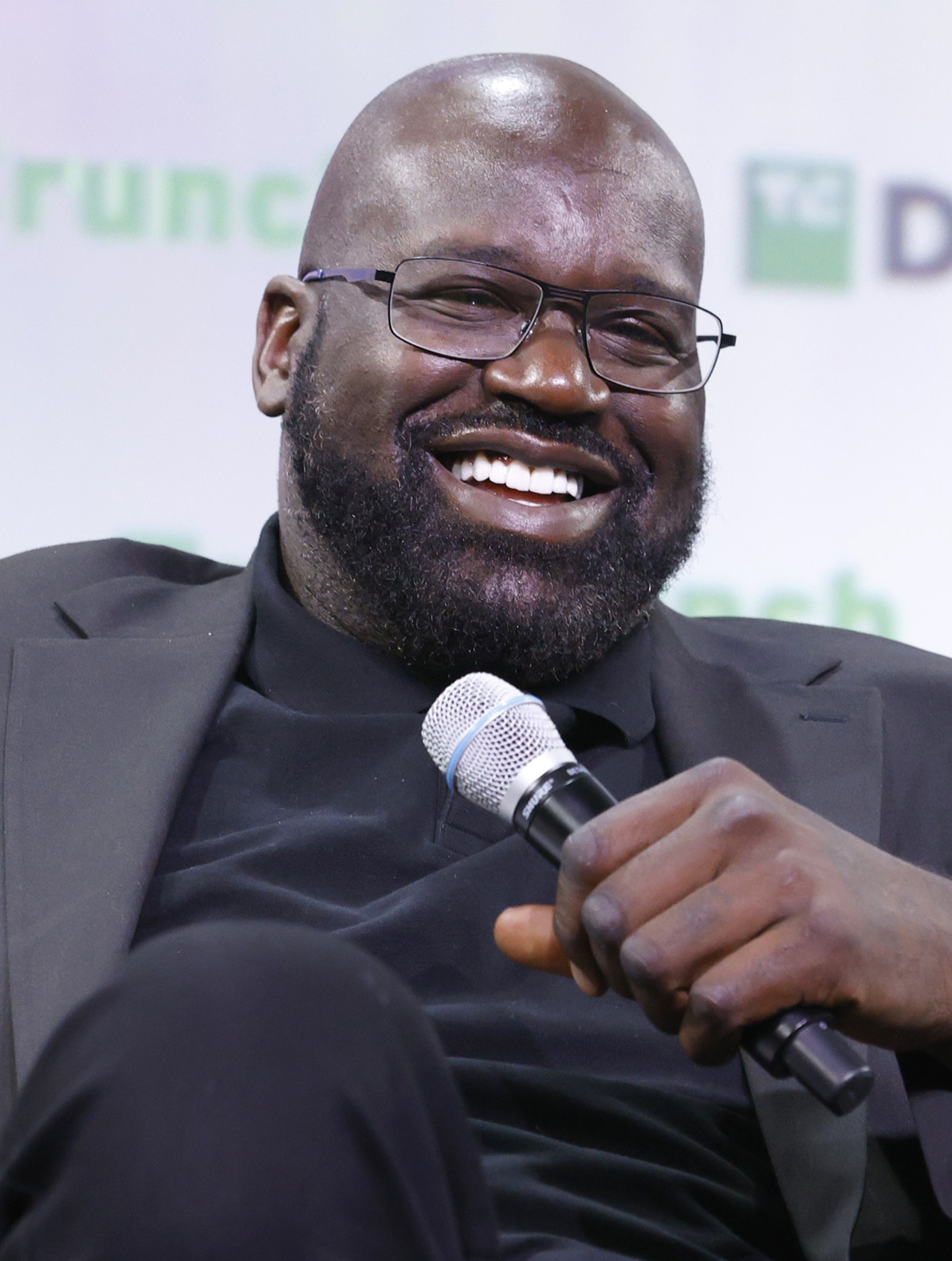
- O'Neal in 2023

Personal information
- Born: March 6, 1972 (age 54) Newark, New Jersey, U.S.
- Listed height: 7 ft 1 in (216 cm)
- Listed weight: 325 lb (147 kg)

Career information
- High school: Fulda American (Fulda, Germany); Robert G. Cole (San Antonio, Texas)
- College: LSU (1989–1992)
- NBA draft: 1992: 1st round, 1st overall pick
- Drafted by: Orlando Magic
- Playing career: 1992–2011
- Position: Center
- Number: 32, 34, 33, 36

Career history
- 1992–1996: Orlando Magic
- 1996–2004: Los Angeles Lakers
- 2004–2008: Miami Heat
- 2008–2009: Phoenix Suns
- 2009–2010: Cleveland Cavaliers
- 2010–2011: Boston Celtics

Career highlights
- 4× NBA champion (2000–2002, 2006); 3× NBA Finals MVP (2000–2002); NBA Most Valuable Player (2000); 15× NBA All-Star (1993–1998, 2000–2007, 2009); 3× NBA All-Star Game MVP (2000, (Note: co-MVP along with Tim Duncan) 2004, 2009 (Note: co-MVP along with Kobe Bryant)); 8× All-NBA First Team (1998, 2000–2006); 2× All-NBA Second Team (1995, 1999); 4× All-NBA Third Team (1994, 1996, 1997, 2009); 3× NBA All-Defensive Second Team (2000, 2001, 2003); NBA Rookie of the Year (1993); NBA All-Rookie First Team (1993); 2× NBA scoring champion (1995, 2000); NBA anniversary team (50th, 75th); No. 34 retired by Los Angeles Lakers; No. 32 retired by Miami Heat; No. 32 retired by Orlando Magic; Associated Press Player of the Year (1991); UPI Player of the Year (1991); Adolph Rupp Trophy (1991); 2× Consensus first-team All-American (1991, 1992); NCAA rebounding leader (1991); NCAA blocks leader (1992); 2× SEC Male Athlete of the Year (1991, 1992); 2× SEC Player of the Year (1991, 1992); 3× First-team All-SEC (1990–1992); No. 33 retired by LSU Tigers; FIBA World Championship MVP (1994); USA Basketball Male Athlete of the Year (1994); McDonald's All-American Game Co-MVP (1989); First-team Parade All-American (1989); Texas Mr. Basketball (1989)

Career statistics
- Points: 28,596 (23.7 ppg)
- Rebounds: 13,099 (10.9 rpg)
- Blocks: 2,732 (2.3 bpg)
- Stats at NBA.com
- Stats at Basketball Reference
- Basketball Hall of Fame
- FIBA Hall of Fame
- Collegiate Basketball Hall of Fame
Medals
Men's basketball
Representing the United States
Olympic Games
Gold medal – first place	1996 Atlanta	Team competition
FIBA World Championship
Gold medal – first place	1994 Toronto	Team competition

Shaquille Rashaun O'Neal (Note: Pronunciation: /ʃəˈkiːl/, shə-KEEL) (born March 6, 1972), often referred to by his nickname "Shaq", (Note: Pronunciation: /ʃæk/, SHAK) is an American former professional basketball player who is a sports analyst. A 7-foot-1-inch (2.16 m) center, O'Neal played for six different teams over his 19-year career in the National Basketball Association (NBA). He is a four-time NBA champion, three-time NBA Finals MVP, and the 2000 NBA MVP. He is widely regarded as one of the most dominant centers in NBA history and one of the greatest basketball players of all time.

After playing college basketball for the LSU Tigers, O'Neal was selected by the Orlando Magic with the first overall pick in the 1992 NBA draft. He was named NBA Rookie of the Year in 1992–93 and led his team to the 1995 NBA Finals. After four years with the Magic, O'Neal signed as a free agent with the Los Angeles Lakers. He and the Lakers won the NBA championship in 2000, 2001, and 2002. Amid a feud between O'Neal and his teammate Kobe Bryant, O'Neal was traded in 2004 to the Miami Heat, where he won his fourth NBA championship in 2006. During the last several years of his career he spent short stints with the Phoenix Suns, the Cleveland Cavaliers and the Boston Celtics.

O'Neal's accolades include 15 All-Star Game selections, three All-Star Game MVP awards, 14 All-NBA team selections, three NBA All-Defensive Team selections and two scoring titles. He is one of three players to be named NBA MVP, All-Star Game MVP and Finals MVP in the same year. He ranks 9th all-time in points scored, 6th in field goals, 15th in rebounds, and 8th in blocks. He had a 58.2% career field goal percentage and led the league in field goal percentage ten times. He is a member of the Naismith Memorial Basketball Hall of Fame and the FIBA Hall of Fame, and was named to the NBA 50th Anniversary Team and the NBA 75th Anniversary Team as one of the greatest players in league history.

In addition to his basketball career, O'Neal has released four rap albums, including the platinum-certified Shaq Diesel (1993) and the gold-certified Shaq Fu: Da Return (1994). Under the name Diesel, he produces electronic music and tours as a DJ. He has appeared in numerous films and has starred in reality shows such as Shaq Vs. and Shaq's Big Challenge. O'Neal is the general manager of the Sacramento State Hornets men's basketball team.

== Early life ==
Shaquille Rashaun O'Neal was born on March 6, 1972, in Newark, New Jersey, to Joe Toney and Lucille O'Neal. Toney had played high school basketball and was offered a scholarship to play at Seton Hall. He struggled with drug addiction and was imprisoned for drug possession when O'Neal was an infant. Upon his release, he did not resume a place in O'Neal's life and relinquished his parental rights to O'Neal's stepfather, Phillip Arthur Harrison, a career Army sergeant. O'Neal remained estranged from Toney for decades and was not interested in establishing a relationship. In his 1994 single "Biological Didn't Bother", O'Neal called Harrison his father. Harrison died of a heart attack in 2013. O'Neal met Toney for the first time in 2016.

O'Neal's family moved many times during his childhood, sometimes staying with relatives, including O'Neal's grandmother in Jersey City. In addition to living in multiple cities in New Jersey, the family also lived in Georgia, Texas and Germany. In his 2002 autobiography, O'Neal wrote that he still considers Newark his home. He credited the Boys & Girls Clubs of America in Newark with keeping him off the streets during his youth and giving him a safe place to play basketball. O'Neal's mother is Baptist and his stepfather was Muslim, and they taught him both religions.

O'Neal's parents were both over 6 feet (1.83 meters) tall, and by age thirteen O'Neal was 6 ft 6 in (1.98 m) tall. He played basketball at Robert G. Cole High School in San Antonio, Texas, leading his team to a 68–1 record over two years and winning the state championship during his senior year. His 791 rebounds during the 1988-89 season remains a Texas record for a high school player. O'Neal wore the No. 33 jersey in high school because he admired Patrick Ewing, who wore 33. O'Neal's high school basketball team retired the No. 33 in 2014.

== College career ==
After graduating from high school in 1989, O'Neal studied business at Louisiana State University (LSU), where he joined the Theta Kappa chapter of Omega Psi Phi fraternity. He played basketball for the LSU Tigers under coach Dale Brown, whom he had met years earlier at the U.S. Army base in Wildflecken, West Germany, where his stepfather was stationed. While playing for LSU, O'Neal was a two-time All-American, two-time SEC Player of the Year, and received the Adolph Rupp Trophy as NCAA men's basketball player of the year in 1991. He was also named college player of the year by the Associated Press and UPI. O'Neal left LSU after three years to pursue his NBA career, but later returned to the university, earning a bachelor's degree in general studies with a minor in political science in 2000. He was later inducted into the LSU Hall of Fame. A 900-pound (410 kg) bronze statue of O'Neal is located in front of the LSU Basketball Practice Facility.

== Professional career ==
=== Orlando Magic (1992–1996) ===
The Orlando Magic selected O'Neal with the 1st overall pick in the 1992 NBA draft. In the summer before moving to Orlando, Florida, O'Neal spent time in Los Angeles under the tutelage of Hall of Famer Magic Johnson. When joining the Magic, he chose the No. 32 jersey because his veteran teammate Terry Catledge wore No. 33. O'Neal became the first NBA player to be named the Player of the Week in his first week in the league. During his rookie season, he averaged 23.4 points on 56.2% shooting, 13.9 rebounds, and 3.5 blocks per game. He was named the 1993 NBA Rookie of the Year and was the first rookie to be named an All-Star starter since Michael Jordan in 1985. The Magic finished the season 41–41, winning 20 more games than the previous season, but missed the playoffs via a tie-breaker with the Indiana Pacers. According to Sports Illustrated writer Jack McCallum, O'Neal wanted head coach Matty Guokas to be replaced by assistant coach Brian Hill.

In 1993–1994, O'Neal's second season, Hill served as coach and Guokas was reassigned to the front office. O'Neal improved his scoring average to 29.3 points (second in the league behind David Robinson) while leading the NBA in field goal percentage at 60%. On November 20, 1993, against the New Jersey Nets, O'Neal registered the first triple-double of his career, recording 24 points to go along with career highs of 28 rebounds and 15 blocks. He was selected for the All-Star game and the All-NBA 3rd Team. The Magic finished the season with a record of 50–32 and made the playoffs for the first time in franchise history. In his first playoff series, O'Neal averaged 20.7 points and 13.3 rebounds as the Magic were swept by the Pacers.

In O'Neal's third season, 1994–95, he led the NBA in scoring with a 29.3 point average. He finished second in MVP voting behind David Robinson and played in his third straight All-Star Game. O'Neal and Penny Hardaway formed one of the league's top duos and helped the Magic to a 57–25 record and the Atlantic Division title. The Magic won its first-ever playoff series against the Boston Celtics in the 1995 NBA playoffs, then defeated the Chicago Bulls in the conference semifinals and the Pacers in the conference finals. In the NBA Finals, the Magic faced the defending champion Houston Rockets, led by future Hall of Famers Hakeem Olajuwon and Clyde Drexler. During the Finals, O'Neal averaged 28 points on 59.5% shooting, 12.5 rebounds, and 6.3 assists; the Rockets swept the Magic in four games.

O'Neal missed 28 games during the 1995–96 season due to injuries. He averaged 26.6 points and 11 rebounds per game, made the All-NBA 3rd Team, and played in his fourth All-Star Game. The Magic finished with a regular season record of 60–22, second in the Eastern conference behind the Chicago Bulls, who finished with an NBA record 72 wins. The Magic defeated the Detroit Pistons and the Atlanta Hawks in the first two rounds of the 1996 NBA Playoffs, but were swept by the Bulls in the Eastern Conference finals.

=== Los Angeles Lakers (1996–2004) ===
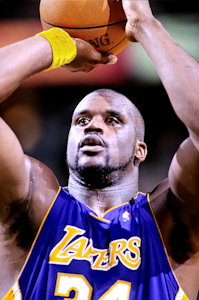
In eight seasons with the Los Angeles Lakers (1996–2004), O'Neal won three consecutive championships (2000–2002) and appeared in the 2004 NBA Finals.

O'Neal became a free agent after the 1995–96 NBA season. While he was weighing his options during the summer of 1996, and amid an ongoing power struggle between him and coach Brian Hill, the Orlando Sentinel published a poll asking whether the Magic should fire Hill if that were one of O'Neal's conditions for staying with the team, and whether O'Neal was worth the $115 million the Magic had offered him. The vast majority of respondents replied "no" to both questions. (Note: Attributed to multiple references:) O'Neal was reportedly upset by the poll results and by earlier assertions in the Orlando media that he was not a good role model because he had a child with his longtime girlfriend with no immediate plans to marry.

At the 1996 Olympics in Atlanta, O'Neal and the U.S. Olympic basketball team won the gold medal. Near the start of the Olympics, it was announced that O'Neal would join the Los Angeles Lakers on a seven-year, $121 million contract. O'Neal insisted he did not choose the Lakers for the money. He switched his jersey to No. 34, as the No. 32 jersey he had worn in Orlando had been retired by the Lakers in honor of Magic Johnson, and the No. 33 jersey he had worn at LSU had been retired in honor of Kareem Abdul-Jabbar. The No. 34 jersey was also chosen in honor of his stepfather, who wore that number in the Army.

==== First two seasons (1996–1998) ====
The Lakers won 56 games during the 1996–97 season. O'Neal averaged 26.2 points and 12.5 rebounds in his first season with the team, but missed over 30 games due to injuries. The Lakers made the playoffs, but were eliminated in the second round by the Utah Jazz in five games. In his first playoff game for the Lakers, O'Neal scored 46 points against the Portland Trail Blazers, the most for a Lakers player in a playoff game since Jerry West's 53 points in 1969. On December 17, 1996, O'Neal shoved Dennis Rodman of the Chicago Bulls; the Los Angeles Daily News later reported that O'Neal was willing to be suspended for fighting Rodman.

During the 1997–98 season, O'Neal averaged 28.3 points and 11.4 rebounds with a 58.4 field goal percentage. It was the first of four consecutive seasons in which he led the league in field goal percentage. The Lakers finished the season 61–21, first in the Pacific Division, and were the second seed in the Western Conference during the 1998 NBA Playoffs. After defeating the Portland Trail Blazers and Seattle SuperSonics in the first two rounds, the Lakers again lost to the Jazz, this time in a 4–0 sweep.

==== O'Neal–Bryant tandem buildup (1998–1999) ====
With the tandem of O'Neal and the Lakers' teenage superstar Kobe Bryant, expectations for the team increased, although personnel changes led to instability during the 1998–99 season. The Lakers traded long-time point guard Nick Van Exel to the Denver Nuggets, and acquired Glen Rice from the Charlotte Hornets to satisfy O'Neal's demand for a strong shooter. Coach Del Harris was fired, and former Lakers forward Kurt Rambis finished the season as head coach. The Lakers finished with a 31–19 record during the lockout-shortened season. Although they made the playoffs, they were swept by the San Antonio Spurs, led by Tim Duncan and David Robinson, in the second round of the Western Conference playoffs.

In June 1998, O'Neal chose not to renew his sponsorship agreement with Reebok after a mother complained to him about the high price of his signature Reebok shoes. He subsequently partnered with Walmart to develop a line of less-expensive shoes.

==== MVP and championship seasons (1999–2002) ====
Before the 1999–2000 season, the Lakers hired Phil Jackson as head coach. During a game against the Houston Rockets in November 1999, O'Neal blocked a layup by the Rockets' Charles Barkley. O'Neal then shoved Barkley, who responded by throwing the ball at O'Neal; both players were ejected from the game. On O'Neal's 28th birthday on March 6, 2000, he scored a career-high 61 points to go along with 23 rebounds and 3 assists in a 123–103 win over the Los Angeles Clippers. It was the most recent game in NBA history during which a player scored 60 or more points without scoring a 3-pointer until Giannis Antetokounmpo scored 64 points against the Indiana Pacers on December 13, 2023.

O'Neal was also voted the 1999–2000 regular season Most Valuable Player, one vote short of becoming the first unanimous MVP in NBA history. Fred Hickman, then of CNN, instead chose Allen Iverson, then of the Philadelphia 76ers, who went on to win MVP the next season. O'Neal also won the scoring title while finishing second in rebounds and third in blocked shots. Jackson's influence resulted in a newfound commitment by O'Neal to defense, resulting in his first All-Defensive Team selection (second-team) in 2000.

In the 2001 NBA Finals against the 76ers, O'Neal fouled out in Game 3 backing over Dikembe Mutombo, the 2000–2001 Defensive Player of the Year. "I didn't think the best defensive player in the game would be flopping like that. It's a shame that the referees buy into that", O'Neal said. "I wish he'd stand up and play me like a man instead of flopping and crying every time I back him down.

A month before the 2001–02 season's training camp, O'Neal had corrective surgery for a claw toe deformity in the smallest toe of his left foot. He opted against a more involved surgery in favor of a quicker return. He was ready for the start of the 2001–02 regular season, but the toe frequently bothered him.

O'Neal and the 2001 NBA champion Los Angeles Lakers with President George W. Bush at the White House

In January 2002, O'Neal was involved in an on-court brawl in a game against the Chicago Bulls. He punched center Brad Miller after Miller intentionally fouled him to prevent a basket, resulting in a melee with Miller, forward Charles Oakley, and several other players. O'Neal was suspended for three games without pay and fined $15,000. For the season, O'Neal averaged 27.2 points and 10.7 rebounds, statistics which were below his career average; he was less of a defensive force during the season.

Matched up against the Sacramento Kings in the 2002 Western Conference finals, O'Neal said, "There is only one way to beat us. It starts with c and ends with t." O'Neal meant "cheat", alluding to the alleged flopping of Kings center Vlade Divac. O'Neal referred to Divac as "she" and said he would never exaggerate contact to draw a foul. "I'm a guy with no talent who has gotten this way with hard work." After the 2001–2002 season, O'Neal told friends that he did not want another season of limping and being in virtually constant pain from his big right toe. His trademark mobility and explosion had been often absent. The corrective options ranged from reconstructive surgery on the toe to rehabilitation exercises with more shoe inserts and anti-inflammation medication. O'Neal was wary of the long-term damage his frequent consumption of these medications might have. He did not want to rush a decision with his career at risk.

Using Jackson's triangle offense, O'Neal and Bryant enjoyed tremendous success, leading the Lakers to three consecutive titles (2000, 2001, and 2002). O'Neal was named MVP of the NBA Finals all three times and had the highest scoring average for a center in NBA Finals history.

==== Toe surgery to departure (2002–2004) ====
O'Neal missed the first 12 games of the 2002–03 season recovering from toe surgery. He was sidelined with hallux rigidus, a degenerative arthritis in his toe. He waited the whole summer until just before training camp for the surgery and explained, "I got hurt on company time, so I'll heal on company time." O'Neal debated whether to have a more invasive surgery that would have kept him out an additional three months, but he opted against the procedure. The Lakers started the season with a record of 11–19. At the end of the season, the Lakers had fallen to the fifth seed and failed to reach the Finals in 2003.

For the 2003–04 season, the team made a concerted off-season effort to improve its roster. They sought the free-agent services of two aging stars—forward Karl Malone and guard Gary Payton—but due to salary cap restrictions, could not offer either player nearly as much money as he could have made with some other teams. O'Neal assisted in the recruitment efforts and personally persuaded both men to join the squad, each forgoing larger salaries in favor of a chance to win an NBA championship. At the beginning of the 2003–04 season, O'Neal wanted a contract extension with a pay raise on his remaining three years for $30 million. The Lakers had hoped O'Neal would take less money due to his age, physical conditioning, and games missed due to injuries. During a preseason game, O'Neal had yelled at Lakers owner Jerry Buss, "Pay me." There had been increasing tension between O'Neal and Bryant. The feud climaxed during training camp before the 2003–2004 season when Bryant, in an interview with ESPN journalist Jim Gray, criticized O'Neal for being out of shape, a poor leader, and putting his salary demands over the interests of the team.

The Lakers made the playoffs in 2004 and lost to the Detroit Pistons in the 2004 NBA Finals. Lakers assistant coach Tex Winter said, "Shaq defeated himself against Detroit. He played way too passively. He had one big game ... He's always interested in being a scorer, but he hasn't had nearly enough concentration on defense and rebounding". After the series, O'Neal was angered by comments made by Lakers general manager Mitch Kupchak about O'Neal's future with the club and by the departure of Lakers coach Phil Jackson at the request of Buss. O'Neal indicated that he felt the team's decisions were centered on a desire to appease Bryant, and O'Neal promptly demanded a trade. Kupchak wanted the Dallas Mavericks' Dirk Nowitzki in return but Mavericks owner Mark Cuban refused to let his 7-footer go. After Miami showed interest in O'Neal, the two clubs agreed on a trade. Winter said, O'Neal "left because he couldn't get what he wanted—a huge pay raise. There was no way ownership could give him what he wanted. Shaq's demands held the franchise hostage, and the way he went about it didn't please the owner too much."

=== Miami Heat (2004–2008) ===
==== MVP runner-up (2004–2005) ====
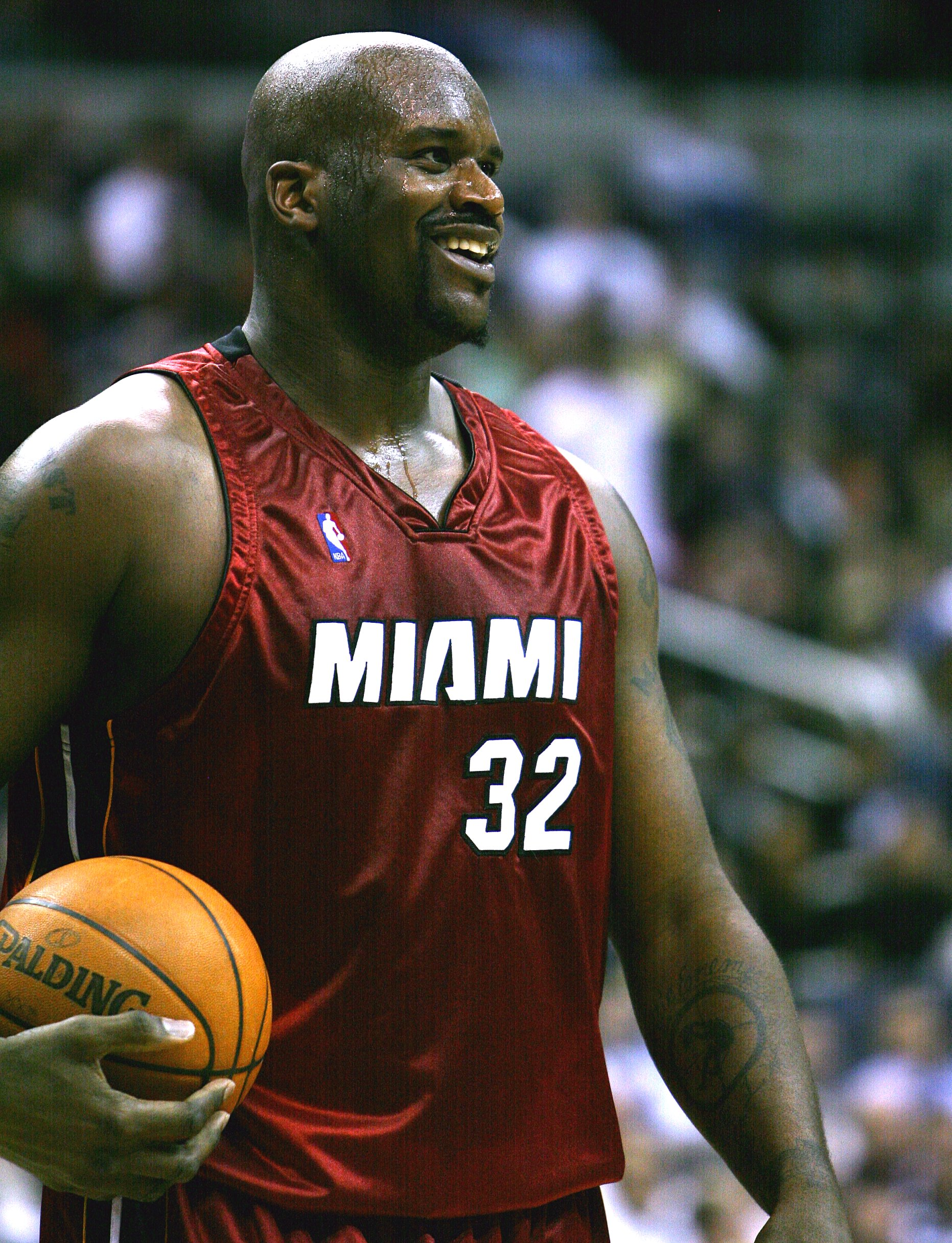
O'Neal with the Miami Heat in February 2007

On July 14, 2004, O'Neal was traded to the Miami Heat for Caron Butler, Lamar Odom, Brian Grant, and a future first-round draft choice (the Lakers used the draft choice to select Jordan Farmar in the 2006 draft). O'Neal reverted from his Lakers jersey number 34 to number 32, which he had worn while playing for the Magic. Upon signing with the Heat, O'Neal promised the fans that he would bring a championship to Miami. He claimed one of the main reasons for wanting to be traded to Miami was because of their up-and-coming star Dwyane Wade, to whom he gave the nickname "Flash". With O'Neal on board, the new-look Heat surpassed expectations, claiming the best record in the Eastern Conference in 2004–05 with 59 wins. He played in 73 games, his most since the 2001 season, and averaged 22.9 points a game along with 10.4 rebounds and 2.3 blocks. O'Neal made his 12th consecutive All-Star Team, made the All-NBA 1st Team, and won the Eastern Conference Player of the Month award for his performance in March. O'Neal also narrowly lost the 2004–05 MVP Award to Phoenix Suns guard Steve Nash in one of the closest votes in NBA history.

Despite being hobbled by a deep thigh bruise, O'Neal led the Heat to the Eastern Conference finals and a game 7 against the defending champion Detroit Pistons, losing by a narrow margin. Afterwards, O'Neal and others criticized Heat head coach Stan Van Gundy for not calling enough plays for O'Neal. In August 2005, O'Neal signed a 5-year-extension with the Heat for $100 million. Supporters applauded O'Neal's willingness to take what amounted to a pay cut and the Heat's decision to secure O'Neal's services for the long term. They contended that O'Neal was worth more than $20 million per year, particularly given that lesser players earned almost the same amount.

==== Fourth championship (2005–2006) ====
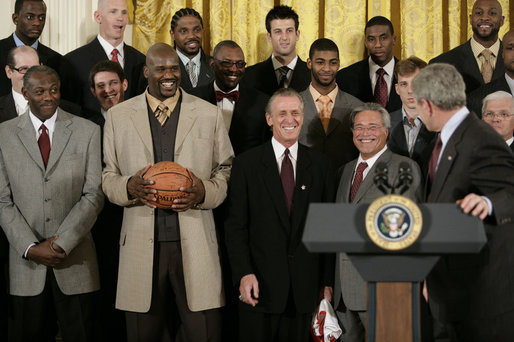
O'Neal holding the championship ball when the NBA champion Miami Heat team visited the White House in February 2007

In the second game of the 2005–06 season, O'Neal injured his right ankle and missed the next 18 games. Upon O'Neal's return, Van Gundy resigned, citing family reasons, and Pat Riley assumed head coach responsibilities. O'Neal later referred to Van Gundy as a "frontrunner" and a "master of panic". Many critics stated that Heat coach Riley correctly managed O'Neal during the rest of the season, limiting his minutes to a career low. Riley felt doing so would allow O'Neal to be healthier and fresher come playoff time. Although O'Neal averaged career lows (or near-lows) in points, rebounds, and blocks, he said in an interview, "Stats don't matter. I care about winning, not stats. If I score zero points and we win I'm happy. If I score 50, 60 points, break the records, and we lose, I'm pissed off. 'Cause I knew I did something wrong. I'll have a hell of a season if I win the championship and average 20 points a game." During the 2005–06 season, the Heat recorded only a .500 record without O'Neal in the line-up.

On April 11, 2006, O'Neal recorded his second career triple-double against the Toronto Raptors with 15 points, 11 rebounds and a career-high 10 assists. O'Neal finished the 2005–06 season as the league leader in field goal percentage. In the 2006 NBA Playoffs, the Heat first faced the younger Chicago Bulls, and O'Neal delivered a dominating 27-point, 16-rebound and 5-block performance in game 1 followed by a 22-point effort in game 2 to help Miami take a 2–0 lead in the series. Chicago would respond with two dominating performances at home to tie the series, but Miami would come right back with a victory at home in game 5. Miami returned to Chicago and closed out the series in the 6th game, highlighted by another dominating performance by O'Neal who finished with 30 points and 20 rebounds. Miami advanced to face New Jersey, who won a surprising game 1 victory before the Heat won four straight to assure a rematch with Detroit. The Pistons had no answer for Wade throughout the series, while O'Neal delivered 21 points and 12 rebounds in game 3 followed by 27 points and 12 boards in game 4 to help Miami take a 3–1 series lead. The Pistons would win game 5 in Detroit, and Wade would once again get injured, but the Heat held on to win game 6 with O'Neal scoring 28 points with 16 rebounds and 5 blocks to help Miami reach their first-ever NBA Finals.

In the Finals, the Heat were underdogs against the Dallas Mavericks led by Dirk Nowitzki, and the Mavericks won the first two games at home in dominating fashion. The Heat, led by Wade and a balanced effort by O'Neal, Antoine Walker, and Jason Williams, won the next three games at home, then won Game 6 in Dallas to deliver the first NBA title for the franchise and O'Neal's fourth title. With Wade carrying the offensive load, O'Neal did not need to have a dominating series; he averaged 13.7 points and 10.2 rebounds.

==== Surgery and Wade's injury (2006–2007) ====
In the 2006–07 season, O'Neal missed 35 games after an injury to his left knee in November required surgery. After one of those missed games, a Christmas Day matchup against the Lakers, he ripped Jackson, whom O'Neal had once called a second father, referring to his former coach as "Benedict Arnold". Jackson had previously said, "The only person I've ever [coached] that hasn't been a worker... is probably Shaq." The Heat struggled during O'Neal's absence, but with his return won seven of their next eight games. Bad luck still haunted the squad, however, as Wade dislocated his left shoulder, leaving O'Neal as the focus of the team. Critics doubted that O'Neal, now in his mid-30s, could carry the team into the playoffs. The Heat went on a winning streak that kept them in the race for a playoff spot, which they finally secured against the Cleveland Cavaliers on April 5.

In a rematch of the previous year, the Heat faced the Bulls in the first round of the 2006–07 NBA playoffs. The Heat struggled against the Bulls and although O'Neal put up reasonable numbers, he was not able to dominate the series. The Bulls swept the Heat, the first time in 50 years a defending NBA champion was swept in the opening round. It was the first time in 13 years that O'Neal did not advance into the second round. In the 2006–07 season O'Neal reached 25,000 career points, becoming the 14th player in NBA history to accomplish that milestone. However, it was the first season in O'Neal's career that his scoring average dropped below 20 points per game.

==== Career lows and disagreements (2007–2008) ====
O'Neal experienced a rough start for the 2007–08 season, averaging career lows in points, rebounds, and blocks. His role in the offense diminished, as he attempted only 10 field goals per game, versus his career average of 17. In addition, O'Neal was plagued by fouls, and during one stretch fouled out of five consecutive games. O'Neal's streak of 14 straight All-Star appearances ended that season. O'Neal again missed games due to injuries, and the Heat had a 15–game losing streak. According to O'Neal, Riley thought he was faking the injury. During a practice in February 2008, O'Neal got into an altercation with Riley over the coach ordering a tardy Jason Williams to leave practice. The two argued face-to-face, with O'Neal poking Riley in the chest and Riley slapping his finger away. Riley soon after decided to trade O'Neal. O'Neal said his relationship with Wade was not "all that good" by the time he left Miami, but he did not express disappointment at Wade for failing to stand up for him.

O'Neal played 33 games for the Miami Heat in the 2007–08 season prior to being traded to the Phoenix Suns. O'Neal started all 33 games and averaged 14.2 points per game. Following the trade to Phoenix, O'Neal averaged 12.9 points while starting all 28 games with the Suns.

=== Phoenix Suns (2008–2009) ===
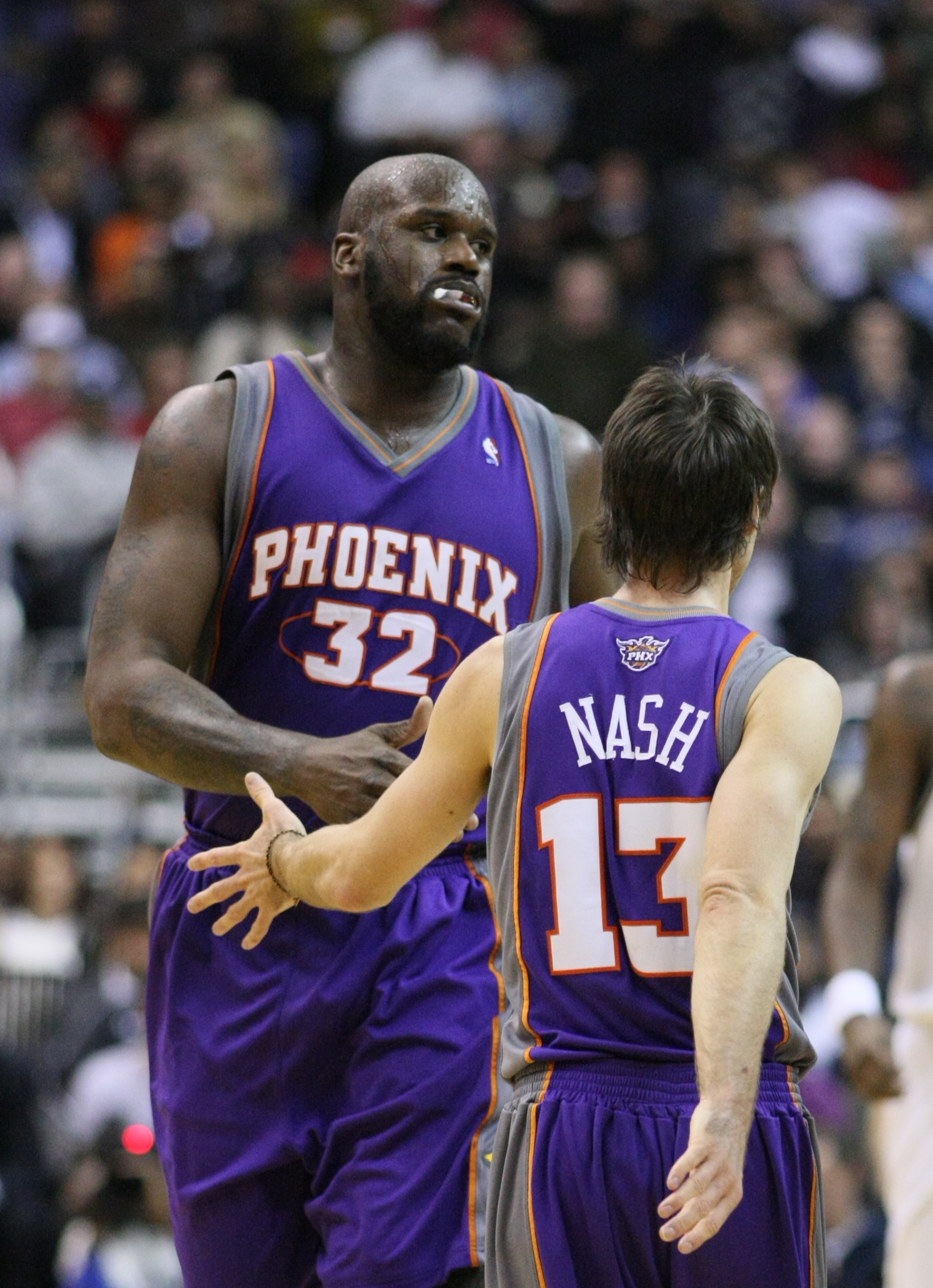
O'Neal with teammate Steve Nash of the Phoenix Suns in January 2009

The Phoenix Suns acquired O'Neal in February 2008 from the league-worst Miami Heat, who had a record at the time of the trade of 9–37, in exchange for Shawn Marion and Marcus Banks. O'Neal made his Suns debut on February 20, 2008, against his former Lakers team, scoring 15 points and grabbing 9 rebounds in the process. The Lakers won, 130–124. O'Neal was upbeat in a post-game press conference, stating: "I will take the blame for this loss because I wasn't in tune with the guys [...] But give me four or five days to really get in tune and I'll get it."

In 28 regular season games, O'Neal averaged 12.9 points and 10.6 rebounds, good enough to make the playoffs. One of the reasons for the trade was to limit Tim Duncan in the event of a postseason matchup between the Suns and the San Antonio Spurs, especially after the Suns' six-game elimination by the Spurs in the 2007 NBA Playoffs. O'Neal and the Phoenix Suns did face the Spurs in the first round of the playoffs, but they were once again eliminated, in five games. O'Neal averaged 15.2 points, 9.2 rebounds and 1.0 assists per game.

O'Neal preferred his new situation with the Suns over the Heat. "I love playing for this coach and I love playing with these guys", O'Neal said. "We have professionals who know what to do. No one is asking me to play with [his former Heat teammates] Chris Quinn or Ricky Davis. I'm actually on a team again." Riley felt O'Neal was wrong for maligning his former teammates. O'Neal responded with an expletive toward Riley, whom he often referred to as the "great Pat Riley" while playing for the Heat. O'Neal credited the Suns training staff with prolonging his career. They connected his arthritic toe, which would not bend, to the alteration of his jump that consequently was straining his leg. The trainers had him concentrate on building his core strength, flexibility, and balance.

The 2008–09 season, improved for O'Neal, who averaged 18 points, 9 rebounds, and 1.6 blocks through the first half (41 games) of the season, leading the Suns to a 23–18 record and 2nd place in their division. He returned to the All-Star Game in 2009 and emerged as co-MVP along with ex-teammate Kobe Bryant.

On February 27, 2009, O'Neal scored 45 points and grabbed 11 rebounds, his 49th career 40-point game, beating the Toronto Raptors 133–113.

In a matchup against Orlando on March 3, 2009, O'Neal was outscored by Magic center Dwight Howard, 21–19. "I'm really too old to be trying to outscore 18-year-olds", O'Neal said, referring to the then 23-year-old Howard. "It's not really my role anymore." O'Neal was double-teamed most of the night. "I like to play people one-on-one. My whole career I had to play people one-on-one. Never once had to double or ask for a double. But it's cool", said O'Neal. During the game, O'Neal flopped against Howard. Magic coach Stan Van Gundy, who had coached O'Neal with the Heat, was "very disappointed cause [O'Neal] knows what it's like. Let's stand up and play like men, and I think our guy did that tonight." O'Neal responded, "Flopping is playing like that your whole career. I was trying to take the charge, trying to get a call. It probably was a flop, but flopping is the wrong use of words. Flopping would describe his coaching." Mark Madsen, a Lakers teammate of O'Neal's for three years, found it amusing since "everyone in the league tries to flop on Shaq and Shaq never flops back." In a 2006 interview in TIME, O'Neal said if he were NBA commissioner, he would "Make a guy have to beat a guy—not flop and get calls and be nice to the referees and kiss ass."

On March 6, O'Neal talked about the upcoming game against the Rockets and Yao Ming. "It's not going to be man-on-man, so don't even try that," says O'Neal with an incredulous laugh. "They're going to double and triple me like everybody else ... I rarely get to play [Yao] one-on-one ... But when I play him (on defense), it's just going to be me down there. So don't try to make it a Yao versus Shaq thing, when it's Shaq versus four other guys."

The 2009 NBA Playoffs was also the first time since O'Neal's rookie season in 1992–93 that he did not participate in the playoffs. He was named as a member of the All-NBA Third Team. The Suns notified O'Neal he might be traded to cut costs.

=== Cleveland Cavaliers (2009–2010) ===
On June 25, 2009, O'Neal was traded to the Cleveland Cavaliers for Ben Wallace, Sasha Pavlovic, $500,000, and a 2010 second-round draft pick. Upon arriving in Cleveland, O'Neal said, "My motto is very simple: Win a Ring for the King", referring to LeBron James. James was the leader of the team, and O'Neal deferred to him. On February 25, 2010, O'Neal suffered a severe right thumb injury while attempting to go up for a shot against Glen Davis of the Boston Celtics. He had surgery on the thumb on March 1 and returned to play in time for the first round of the playoffs.

After defeating the Chicago Bulls in the first round, the Cavaliers went on to lose to the Boston Celtics in the second round. In September 2016, O'Neal said: "When I was in Cleveland, we were in first place. Big Baby [Glen Davis] breaks my hand and I had to sit out five weeks late in the year. I come back finally in the first round of the playoffs, and we lost to Boston in the second round. I was upset. I know for a fact if I was healthy, we would have gotten it done that year and won a ring." O'Neal averaged career lows in almost every major statistical category during the 2009–10 season, largely due to splitting Center duties with Zydrunas Ilgauskas.

=== Boston Celtics (2010–2011) ===
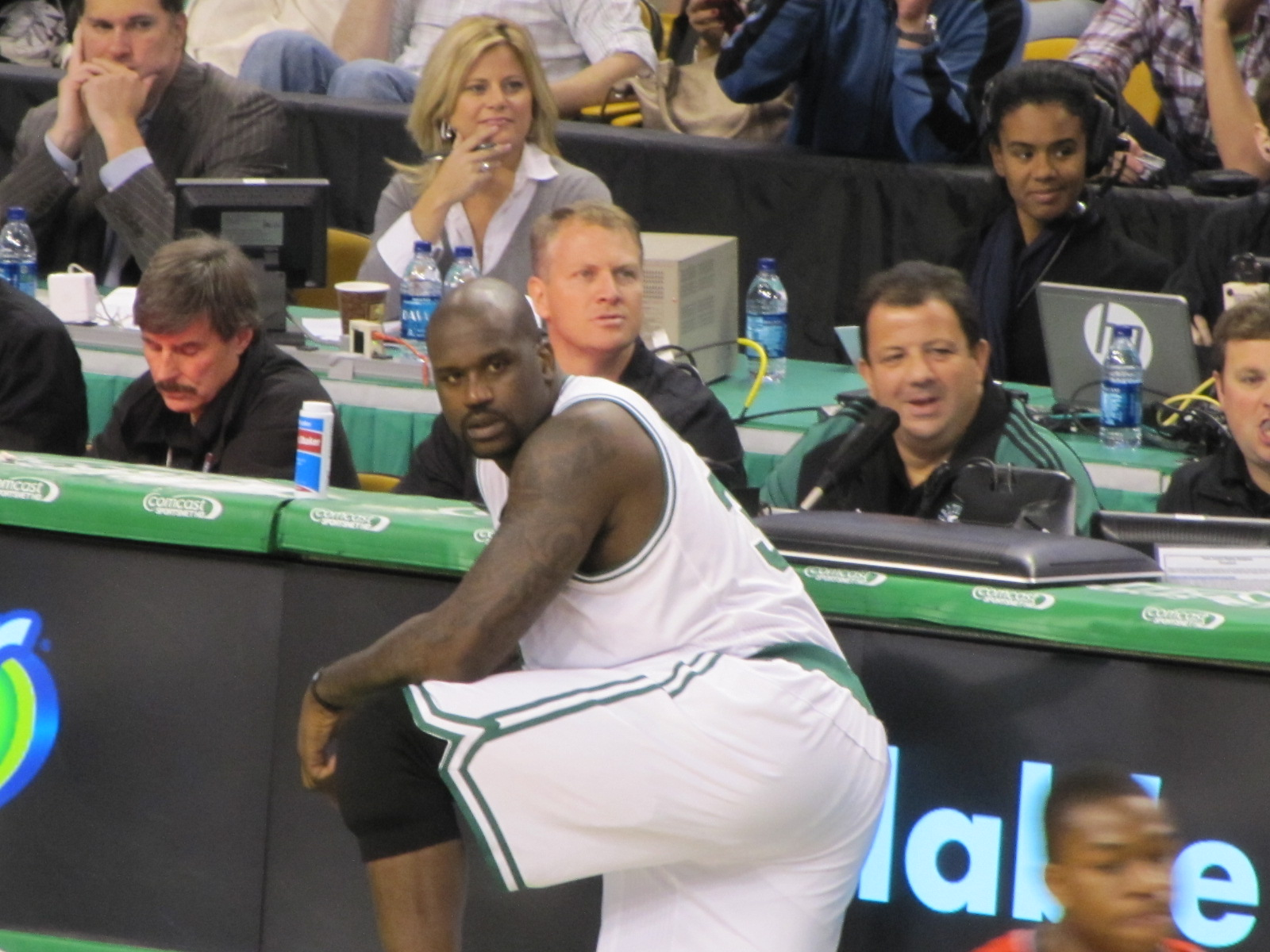
O'Neal with the Boston Celtics in October 2010

Upon hearing Bryant comment that he had more rings than O'Neal, Wyc Grousbeck, principal owner of the Boston Celtics, saw an opportunity to acquire O'Neal. Celtics coach Doc Rivers agreed to the signing on the condition that O'Neal would not receive preferential treatment, nor could he cause any locker room problems like in Los Angeles or Miami. On August 4, 2010, the Celtics announced that they had signed O'Neal. The contract was for two years at the veteran minimum salary for a total contract value of $2.8 million. O'Neal wanted the larger mid-level exception contract, but the Celtics chose instead to give it to Jermaine O'Neal. The Atlanta Hawks and the Dallas Mavericks also expressed interest but had stalled on O'Neal's salary demands. He was introduced by the Celtics on August 10, 2010, and chose the number 36.

O'Neal said he did not "compete with little guys who run around dominating the ball, throwing up 30 shots a night—like D–Wade, Kobe." O'Neal added that he was only competing against Duncan: "If Tim Duncan gets five rings, then that gives some writer the chance to say 'Duncan is the best,' and I can't have that." Publicly, he insisted he did not care whether he started or substituted for the Celtics, but expected to be part of the second unit. Privately, he wanted to start, but kept it to himself. O'Neal missed games throughout the season due to an assortment of ailments to his right leg including knee, calf, hip, and Achilles injuries. The Celtics traded away center Kendrick Perkins in February partially due to the expectation that O'Neal would return to fill Perkins' role. The Celtics were 33–10 in games Perkins had missed during the year due to injury, and they were 19–3 in games that O'Neal played over 20 minutes. After requesting a cortisone shot, O'Neal returned April 3 after missing 27 games due to his Achilles; he played only five minutes due to a strained right calf. It was the last regular season game he would play that year. O'Neal missed the first round of the 2011 playoffs. He insisted on more cortisone shots and returned in the second round, but he was limited to 12 minutes in two games as the Heat eliminated the Celtics from the playoffs.

On June 1, 2011, O'Neal announced his retirement via social media. On a short video on Twitter, O'Neal tweeted, "We did it. Nineteen years, baby. I want to thank you very much. That's why I'm telling you first. I'm about to retire. Love you. Talk to you soon." On June 3, 2011, O'Neal held a press conference at his home in Orlando to officially announce his retirement.

== National team career ==
While in college, O'Neal was considered for the Dream Team to fill the college spot, but it eventually went to future teammate Christian Laettner. His national team career began in the 1994 FIBA World Championship in which he was named MVP of the Tournament. While he led the Dream Team II to the gold medal with an 8–0 record, O'Neal averaged 18 points and 8.5 rebounds and recorded two double-doubles. In four games, he scored more than 20 points. Before 2010, he was the last active American player to have a gold from the FIBA World Cup.

He was one of two players (the other being Reggie Miller) from the 1994 roster to be also named to the Dream Team III. Due to more star-power, he rotated with Hakeem Olajuwon and David Robinson and started 3 games. He averaged 9.3 points and 5.3 rebounds with 8 total blocks. Again, a perfect 8–0 record landed him another gold medal at the 1996 Olympics in Atlanta. O'Neal was upset that coach Lenny Wilkens played Robinson more minutes in the final game; Wilkens previously explained to O'Neal that it would probably be Robinson's last Olympics.

After his 1996 experience, he declined to play in international competition. He was angered by being overlooked for the 1999 FIBA AmeriCup squad, saying it was a "lack of respect". He forwent an opportunity to participate in the 2000 Olympics, explaining that two gold medals were enough. O'Neal also chose not to play in the 2002 FIBA World Championship. He rejected an offer to play in the 2004 Olympics, and although he was initially interested in being named for 2006–2008 US preliminary roster, he eventually declined the invitation.

== Player profile ==
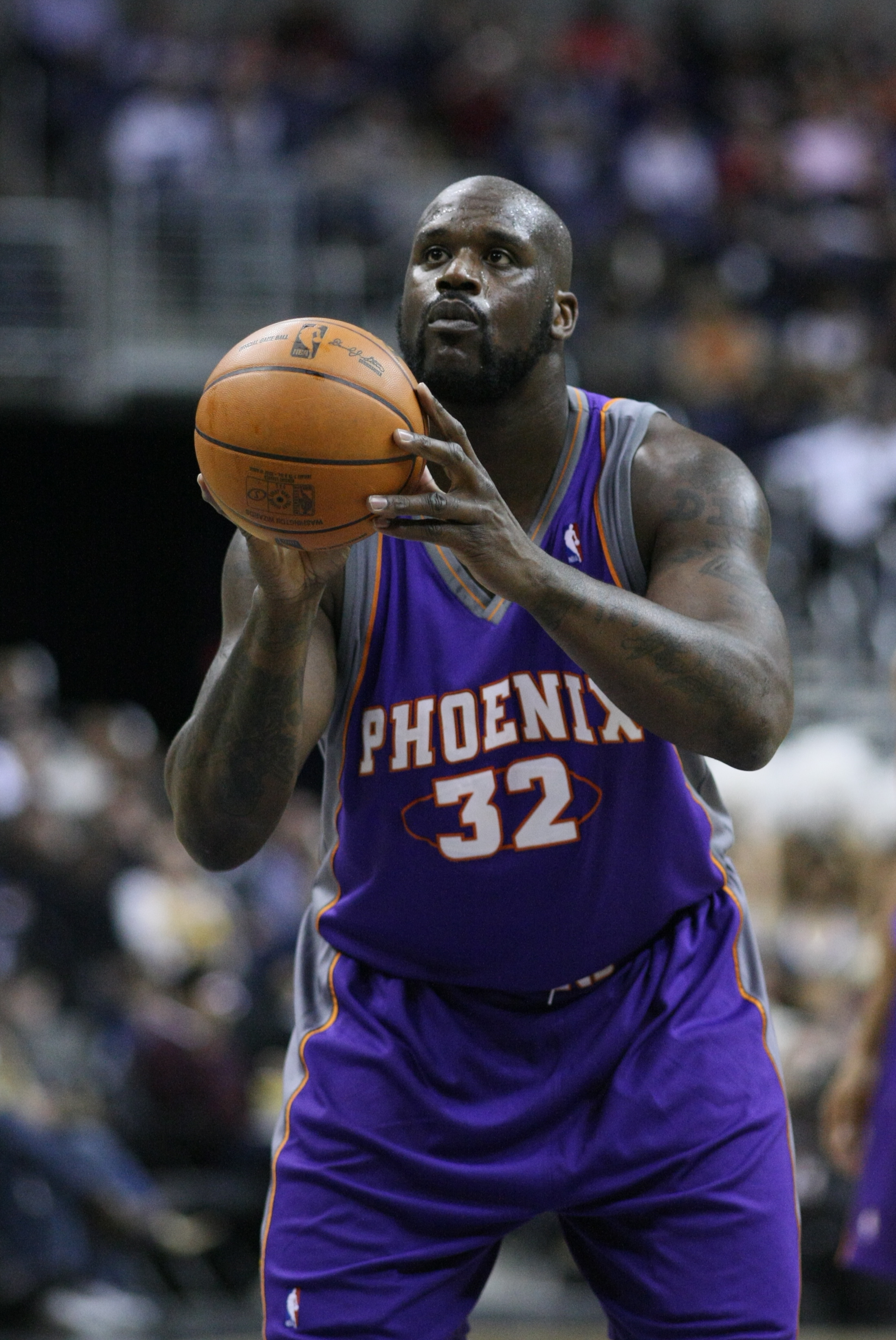
O'Neal's free throw shooting was regarded as one of his major weaknesses.

O'Neal is widely considered one of the greatest centers and players of all time, and is sometimes regarded as the most dominant player ever. ESPN ranked him as the tenth greatest NBA player and the fifth greatest player of the 21st century, and wrote that he was the most dominant player of all time. ESPN also ranked him as the fifth greatest center of all time. Slam Magazine ranked O'Neal as the sixth greatest player of all time. The Athletic ranked him as the eighth greatest basketball player ever, and wrote that he was "perhaps the most physically dominant post presence in league history". NBC Sports Boston ranked O'Neal as the fourth greatest center in NBA history. CBS Sports ranked O'Neal as the ninth greatest player of all time, and wrote that he was "probably the most dominant physical force in league history".

O'Neal established himself as an overpowering low post presence, putting up career averages of 23.7 points on .582 field goal accuracy, 10.9 rebounds and 2.3 blocks per game.

At 7 ft 1 in (2.16 m), 330 lb (150 kg) and U.S. shoe size 23, he became famous for his physical stature. His physical frame gave him a power advantage over most opponents. On two occasions during his first season in the NBA, his powerful dunks broke the steel backboard supports, prompting the league to increase the brace strength and stability of the backboards for the following 1993–94 season.

O'Neal's "drop step", (called the "Black Tornado" by O'Neal) in which he posted up a defender, turned around and, using his elbows for leverage, powered past him for a very high-percentage slam dunk, proved an effective offensive weapon. In addition, O'Neal frequently used a right-handed jump hook shot to score near the basket. The ability to dunk contributed to his career field goal accuracy of .582, second only to Artis Gilmore as the highest field goal percentage of all time. He led the NBA in field goal percentage 10 times, breaking Wilt Chamberlain's record of nine.

Opposing teams often used up many fouls on O'Neal, reducing the playing time of their own big men. O'Neal's imposing physical presence inside the paint caused dramatic changes in many teams' offensive and defensive strategies.

O'Neal's primary weakness was his free throw shooting, with a career average of 52.7%. He once missed all 11 of his free throw attempts in a game against the Seattle SuperSonics on December 8, 2000, a record. O'Neal believes his free throw woes were a mental issue, as he often shot 80 percent in practice. In hope of exploiting O'Neal's poor foul shooting, opponents often committed intentional fouls against him, a tactic known as "Hack-a-Shaq". O'Neal was the third-ranked player all-time in free throws taken, having attempted 11,252 free-throws in 1,207 games up to and including the 2010–11 season. On December 25, 2008, O'Neal missed his 5,000th free throw, becoming the second player in NBA history to do so, along with Chamberlain.

O'Neal only made one three-point shot during his entire career. He made the shot during the 1995–96 NBA season with the Orlando Magic. His career three-point-shot record is 1 for 22 (a 4.5% career percentage).

O'Neal was a capable defender, named three times to the All-NBA Second Defensive Team. His presence intimidated opposing players shooting near the basket, and he averaged 2.3 blocked shots per game over the course of his career.

Phil Jackson believed O'Neal underachieved in his career, saying he "could and should have been the MVP player for 10 consecutive seasons." In 2022, to commemorate the NBA's 75th Anniversary The Athletic ranked their top 75 players of all time, and named O'Neal as the 8th greatest player in NBA history.

The Lakers retired his No. 34 jersey on April 2, 2013. On February 26, 2016, the Miami Heat announced that it would retire O'Neal's No. 32 jersey during the 2016–17 season, making O'Neal one of just 32 athletes in American professional sports history to have their jersey retired by multiple teams. The Heat eventually retired his jersey on December 22, 2016, during halftime of a game against his former team, the Los Angeles Lakers. On February 13, 2024, the Orlando Magic retired O'Neal's No. 32 jersey, the first time they retired a players' number. He became the third player to have his number retired by three NBA teams, joining Wilt Chamberlain and Pete Maravich.

== Off the court ==
=== Media personality ===
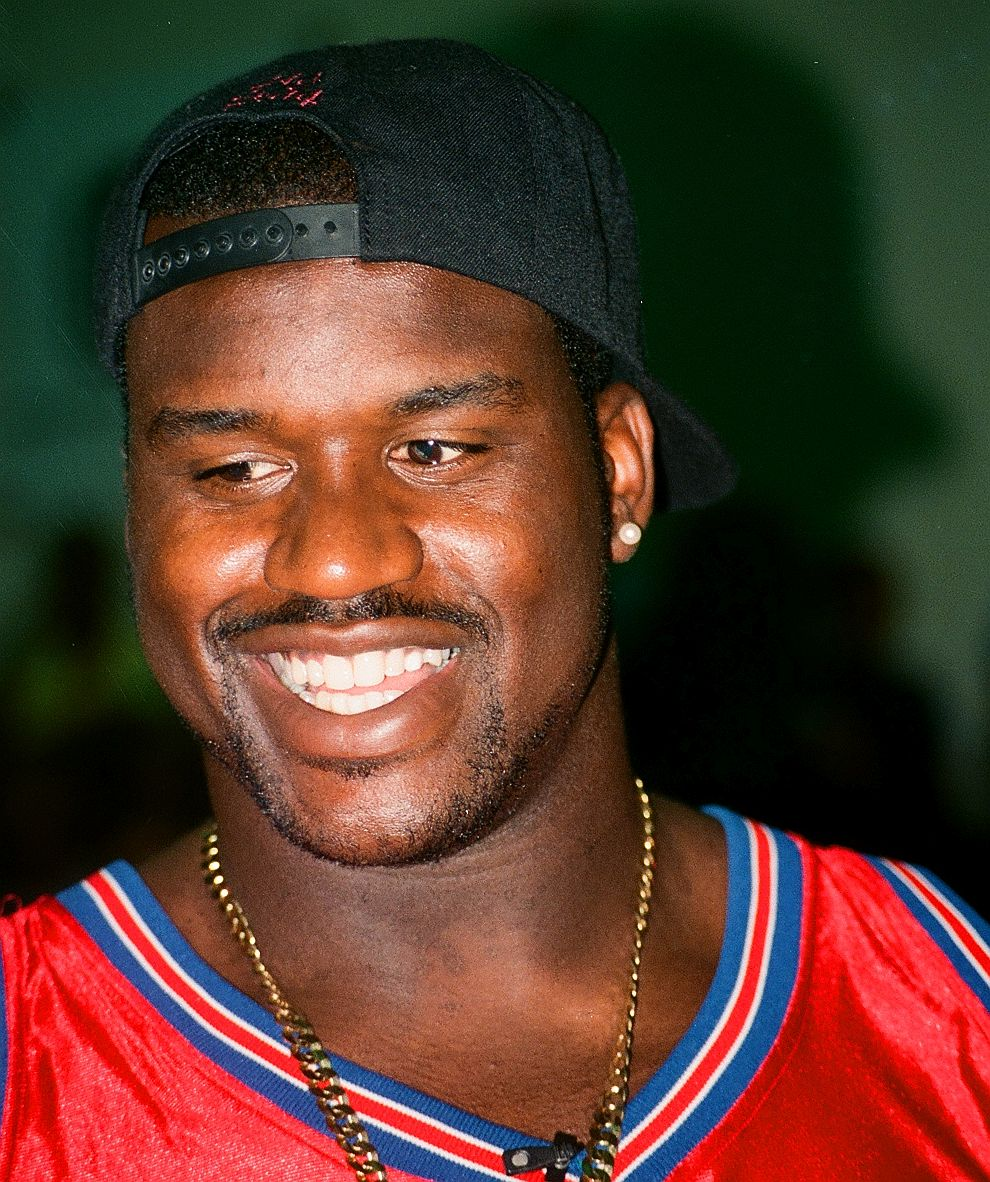
O'Neal in 1998

Journalists and others have given O'Neal many nicknames, including "Shaq" and "Diesel". (Note: Other nicknames include Shaq Fu, The Big Daddy, Superman, The Big Agave, The Big Cactus, The Big Shaqtus, The Big Galactus, Wilt Chamberneezy, The Big Baryshnikov, The Real Deal, The Big Shamrock, The Big Leprechaun, Shaqovic and The Big Conductor.) O'Neal has referred to himself as "The Big Aristotle" and "Hobo Master" for his composure and insights during interviews. Although he was a favorite interviewee of the press, O'Neal was sensitive and often went weeks without speaking. When he did not want to speak with the press, he would murmur in his low-pitched voice.

During the 2000 Screen Actors Guild strike, O'Neal performed in a commercial for Disney. He was fined by the union for crossing the picket line.

O'Neal's humorous and sometimes incendiary comments fueled the Los Angeles Lakers' long-standing rivalry with the Sacramento Kings; O'Neal frequently referred to the Sacramento team as the "Queens". During the 2002 victory parade, O'Neal declared that Sacramento would never be the capital of California, after the Lakers beat the Kings in a tough seven-game series en route to its third championship with O'Neal.

He was criticized for mocking Chinese people when interviewed about newcomer center Yao Ming. O'Neal told a reporter, "you tell Yao Ming, ching chong yang, wah, ah so." O'Neal later said it was locker room humor and he meant no offense. Yao believed that O'Neal was joking, but he said many Asians wouldn't see the humor. Yao joked, "Chinese is hard to learn. I had trouble with it when I was little." O'Neal later expressed regret for the way he treated Yao early in his career.

When the Lakers faced the Heat on January 16, 2006, O'Neal and Bryant made headlines by engaging in handshakes and hugs before the game, an event that was believed to signify the end of the so-called "Bryant–O'Neal feud" that had festered since O'Neal left Los Angeles. O'Neal was quoted as saying that he accepted the advice of NBA legend Bill Russell to make peace with Bryant.

O'Neal participated in the 2026 FIFA World Cup draw on December 5, 2025.

=== Music career ===
Shaquille O'Neal
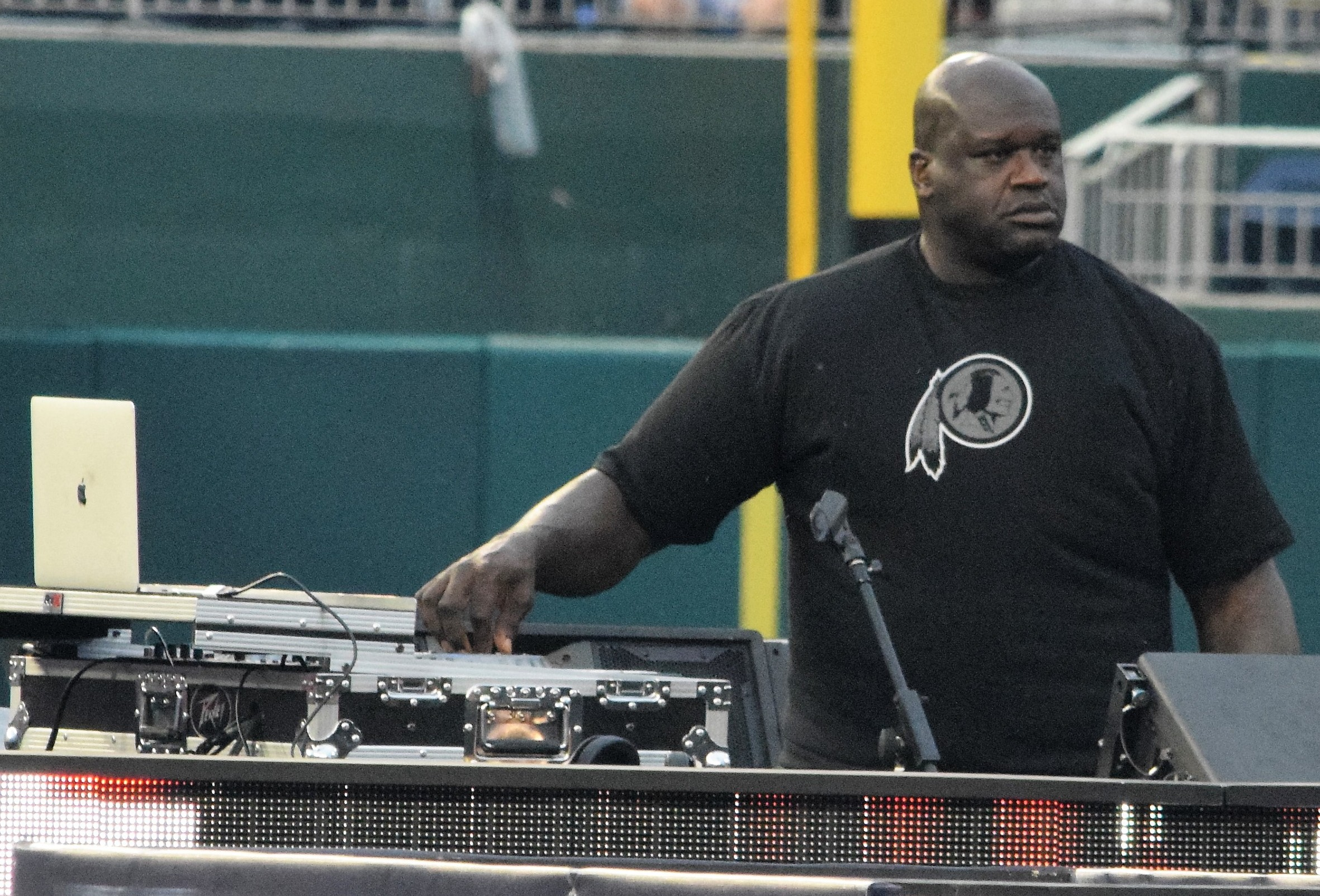
- O'Neal DJing at the All-Star Legends & Celebrity Softball Game at Nationals Park in Washington, D.C., in July 2018

Background information
- Also known as: DJ Diesel
- Genres: Hip-hop, electronic dance music
- Occupations: Rapper, DJ
- Years active: 1993–2001; 2017–present
- Labels: Jive, Interscope, A&M, Trauma, Monstercat

O'Neal started DJing in the 1980s at LSU. Beginning in 1993, O'Neal began to compose rap music. He released five studio albums and one compilation album. Although his rapping abilities were criticized at the outset, one critic credited him with "progressing as a rapper in small steps, not leaps and bounds". His 1993 debut album, Shaq Diesel, received platinum certification from the RIAA.

O'Neal was featured alongside Michael Jackson as a guest rapper on "2 Bad", a song from Jackson's 1995 album HIStory. He contributed three tracks, including the song "We Genie", to the Kazaam soundtrack. He was featured in Aaron Carter's 2001 hit single "That's How I Beat Shaq", and appeared in the song's music video.

Shaquille O'Neal conducted the Boston Pops Orchestra at the Boston Symphony Hall on December 20, 2010.

O'Neal produces electronic dance music and tours the world under the stage name DJ Diesel. On June 7, 2023, O'Neal released his first single as DJ Diesel from his debut album Gorilla Warfare, titled "Bang Your Head" in collaboration with Hairitage. The album was released on August 18. O'Neal also hosted The Big Podcast with Shaq.

=== Law enforcement ===
O'Neal trained at the Los Angeles County Sheriff's Reserve Academy and became a reserve officer with the Los Angeles Port Police. In 2005, he became a Miami Beach reserve officer and an honorary U.S. Deputy Marshal. He was the spokesman for the Safe Surfin' Foundation; he served an honorary role on the task force of the same name, which tracks down sexual predators who target children on the Internet.

In September 2006, O'Neal took part in a raid on a home in rural Bedford County, Virginia. O'Neal had been made an "honorary deputy" by the local sheriff's department. O'Neal was not qualified as a SWAT officer.

In June 2008, the Bedford County, Virginia, and Maricopa County, Arizona, sheriff departments revoked O'Neal's special deputyship after a video surfaced of him rapping about Kobe Bryant and using racial slurs.

On January 20, 2015, O'Neal was sworn in as a reserve officer for Doral, Florida's police force. In December 2016, O'Neal was sworn in as a sheriff's deputy in Jonesboro, Georgia, as part of Clayton County, Georgia Sheriff's Department. O'Neal holds the county record of Tallest Sheriff's Deputy.

On September 19, 2026, O'Neal was declared an honorary FBI special agent by FBI Director Kash Patel. Patel stated that he did this because of O'Neal's love and support for all law enforcement.

=== Acting ===
In the 1990s, O'Neal appeared in the films Blue Chips (1994), Kazaam (1996) and Steel (1997), all of which fared poorly with critics. O'Neal appeared as himself on an episode of Curb Your Enthusiasm, bedridden after Larry David's character accidentally tripped him while stretching, and in two episodes each of My Wife and Kids and The Parkers. He appeared in cameo roles in the films Freddy Got Fingered, Jack and Jill and Scary Movie 4. O'Neal appeared in the 311 music video for the hit single "You Wouldn't Believe" in 2001, in P. Diddy's video for "Bad Boy for Life", the video for Aaron Carter's "That's How I Beat Shaq", the video for Owl City's "Vanilla Twilight" and the video for Maroon 5's "Don't Wanna Know". O'Neal appeared in the movie CB4 in a small "interviewing" scene. O'Neal appeared in a SportsCenter commercial dressed in his Miami police uniform, rescuing Mike the Tiger from a tree. O'Neal reportedly wanted a role in X2 (2003), the second installment of the X-Men film series, but was ignored by the filmmakers. O'Neal appeared as Officer Fluzoo in the comedy sequel Grown Ups 2.

He voiced animated versions of himself on several occasions, including in the animated series Static Shock (2002; episode "Static Shaq"), in Johnny Bravo (1997; episode "Back on Shaq"), in Uncle Grandpa (2014; episode "Perfect Kid"), and in The Lego Movie (2014). He also had a voice over role in the 2013 film The Smurfs 2.

=== Video games ===
O'Neal was featured on the covers of video games NBA Live 96, NBA 2K6, NBA 2K7, NBA Showtime: NBA on NBC, NBA Hoopz, and NBA Inside Drive 2004. O'Neal appeared in the arcade version of NBA Jam (1993), NBA Jam (2003), NBA Ballers (2004), NBA Live 2004, and NBA Ballers: Phenom (2006) as a current player and as a 1990s All-Star. O'Neal starred in Shaq Fu, a fighting game for the Super Nintendo Entertainment System and Sega Genesis. A sequel, Shaq Fu: A Legend Reborn, was released in 2018. O'Neal also appeared in Quest for the Code in 2002 as a voice actor, Backyard Basketball in 2004, Ready 2 Rumble Boxing: Round 2 as a playable boxer, and as an unlockable character in Delta Force: Black Hawk Down. O'Neal was also an unlockable character in UFC Undisputed 2010. In 2024, O'Neal collaborated with Fortnite to appear as player skins, including his DJ Diesel persona and rendition as LEGO minifigure in LEGO Fortnite.

=== Television ===
O'Neal and his mother were featured in the documentary film Apple Pie, which aired on ESPN. O'Neal had a 2005 reality series on ESPN, Shaquille, and hosted a series called Shaq's Big Challenge on ABC.

O'Neal also participated in the 2002 Discovery Channel special Motorcycle Mania 2, requesting an exceptionally large bike to fit his large size from famed custom motorcycle builder Jesse James; in addition to this, O'Neal also appeared in the first Idol Gives Back in 2007, on an episode of Fear Factor, and on an episode of MTV's Jackass, where he was lifted off the ground on Wee Man's back. O'Neal was a professional wrestling fan and made appearances at many WWE and AEW events.

O'Neal starred in a reality show called Shaq Vs. which premiered on August 18, 2009, on ABC. The show featured O'Neal competing against other athletes at their own sports.

On July 14, 2011, O'Neal announced that he would join Turner Network Television (TNT) as an analyst on its NBA basketball games, joining Ernie Johnson, Kenny Smith, and Charles Barkley.

He hosted the show Upload with Shaquille O'Neal which aired on TruTV for one season.

In 2015, O'Neal appeared in the South Korean variety television show Off to School, which involved him attending Seo Incheon High School for three days.

In October 2022, O'Neal signed a long-term contract extension with Warner Bros. Discovery Sports to continue as a host on Inside the NBA.

On May 3, 2024, O'Neal was announced as one of the co-hosts (along with Gina Rodriguez) of the upcoming ABC game show Lucky 13. The series premiered on July 18, 2024.

Netflix released Power Moves worldwide on June 4, 2025, starring Shaquille O'Neal and Allen Iverson (A.I.). The series follows O'Neal and Iverson as they take on the challenge of reviving the Reebok brand, which had nearly disappeared under Adidas's ownership. Alongside sponsorship deals with young athletes like WNBA star Angel Reese, they aim to revitalize the brand's cultural image.

O'Neal served as a judge on the slam dunk competition show Dunkman. The six-episode series aired in December 2025 on TNT, TruTV, and HBO Max.

=== Advertising ===
O'Neal has appeared in commercials for Reebok, Nestlé Crunch, Gold Bond, Buick, The General, Papa John's, Hulu, Epson, Carnival Cruises, Frosted Flakes, American Express, Vitamin Water, and IcyHot.

=== Professional wrestling ===
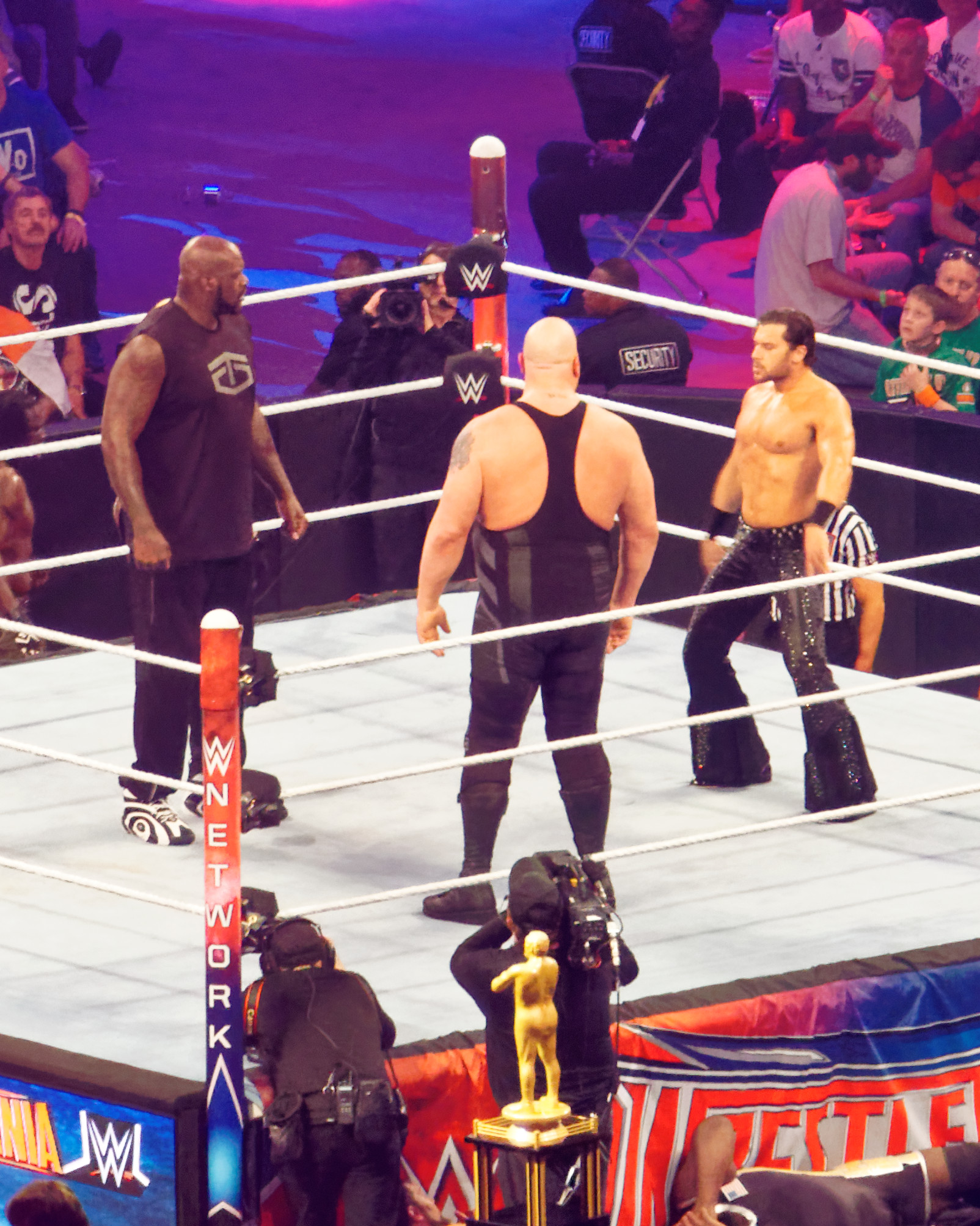
O'Neal (left) facing Big Show during the Andre The Giant Memorial Battle Royal at WrestleMania 32 in Arlington, Texas, in April 2016

A lifelong professional wrestling fan, O'Neal has made numerous appearances at televised events over the years for four different promotions. His favorite wrestlers are Tony Atlas, Junkyard Dog, André the Giant, and Brock Lesnar.

In 1994, O'Neal made several appearances in World Championship Wrestling (WCW), including at the Bash at the Beach pay per view, where he presented the title belt to the winner of the WCW World Heavyweight Championship match between Hulk Hogan and Ric Flair. In July 2009, O'Neal served as the guest host for a live broadcast of World Wrestling Entertainment (WWE)'s Monday Night Raw. As part of the show, O'Neal got into a physical altercation with seven-foot-tall wrestler Big Show. In September 2012, O'Neal made a guest appearance on Total Nonstop Action Wrestling (TNA)'s Impact Wrestling program, where he had a backstage segment with Hulk Hogan.

In April 2016, O'Neal participated in his first-ever match, when he was a surprise celebrity entry in the André the Giant Memorial Battle Royal at WrestleMania 32. O'Neal eliminated Damien Sandow and had another confrontation with Big Show before being eliminated himself by most of the other wrestlers. In July at the 2016 ESPY Awards on the red carpet, Big Show and O'Neal had another brief confrontation. A match was proposed for WrestleMania 33, which O'Neal accepted. In January 2017, the two began calling each other out on social media, posting workout videos of themselves preparing for the potential match. After weeks of discussion, the match was cancelled. According to Dave Meltzer of Wrestling Observer Newsletter, the match was canceled due to monetary reasons, as both parties could not agree on a deal. Big Show later stated it was scheduling issues on O'Neal's part that caused the cancellation.

On the November 11, 2020, episode of AEW Dynamite, Jade Cargill interrupted Cody Rhodes and teased the arrival of O'Neal in All Elite Wrestling (AEW). He made a cameo appearance on Being The Elite and it was later confirmed that O'Neal had been appearing backstage at recent AEW tapings, including Full Gear. He appeared on the December 9 episode of AEW Dynamite and addressed AEW in a sit-down interview with Tony Schiavone and Brandi Rhodes. At the end of the interview, O'Neal got water thrown on him by Brandi after telling her to get pointers from Cargill, who had broken Brandi's arm several weeks ago. On the March 3, 2021, episode of AEW Dynamite titled The Crossroads, O'Neal teamed with Jade Cargill to defeat Cody Rhodes and Red Velvet. During the match, O'Neal paid tribute to Brodie Lee with his signature gesture and powerbomb and was driven through two tables by Cody, who hit O'Neal with a flying crossbody tackle as O'Neal was standing on the ring apron, knocking O'Neal through the tables that were set up at ringside.

=== Business ventures ===
As of 2022, O'Neal was among the five wealthiest NBA players, with a net worth of $400 million.

He was an active bond investor in the early 1990s but also bought stocks, including General Electric, Apple, and PepsiCo. He said stock investing worked best for him when he felt a personal connection with the company. O'Neal was an early investor in Google. In June 2015, he invested in technology startup Loyale3 Holdings Inc., a San Francisco brokerage firm whose website and mobile app enables companies to sell a piece of their IPOs directly to small investors who put up as a little as $100 and also allows investors to regularly buy small amounts of shares in already public companies.

He has appeared in television commercials promoting the Counter-Strike: Global Offensive league ELeague. O'Neal refused to endorse Wheaties cereal because he preferred Frosted Flakes.

O'Neal has been a real estate entrepreneur. With Boraie Development, O'Neal has developed projects in his hometown of Newark, New Jersey, including CityPlex12 and One Riverview. He sought to help Orlando homeowners facing foreclosure by buying the mortgages and selling the homes back to them under more affordable terms.

O'Neal is on the advisory board for Tout Industries, a social video service based in San Francisco. He received the position in return for breaking news of his NBA retirement on the service.

In September 2013, O'Neal became a minority owner of the Sacramento Kings professional basketball team. In April 2018, O'Neal was named the general manager of Kings Guard Gaming, the Kings' NBA 2K League affiliate. In January 2022, O'Neal sold his stake in the Kings.

O'Neal is an investor in esports team NRG Esports.

O'Neal favors franchising businesses because of their simplicity and proven success. In late 2016, he purchased the Krispy Kreme location at 295 Ponce de Leon Avenue in Atlanta. O'Neal is also the global spokesperson for the company. He owned, and later sold, 155 Five Guys fast food restaurants—about 10% of all locations—and owns 17 Auntie Anne's restaurants. O'Neal also owns 150 car washes, 40 health clubs, a movie theater in Newark, and the Big Chicken brand of chicken sandwiches.

In 2018, O'Neal created Shaq's Fun House, an annual music festival, circus, and carnival, with Medium Rare. The event usually features celebrity DJs and performers. In 2022, O'Neal premiered Shaqtoberfest, a Halloween event in Long Beach, California.

In early 2019, O'Neal joined the Papa John's board of directors and invested in nine stores in the Atlanta area. As part of the three-year contract, he became the spokesperson for the company . The next year, Papa John's introduced the Shaq-a-Roni, a pizza dedicated to O'Neal.

In 2021, O'Neal, among other high-profile athletes and celebrities, was a paid spokesperson for FTX, a cryptocurrency exchange. In November 2022, FTX filed for bankruptcy, wiping out billions of dollars in customer funds as well as O'Neal's personal stake in the company. He, alongside other spokespeople, was sued for promoting unregistered securities. In February 2022, the U.S. 11th Circuit Court of Appeals ruled in a lawsuit against Bitconnect that the Securities Act of 1933 extends to targeted solicitation using social media. In June 2025, O'Neal settled the FTX-related lawsuit against him, agreeing to pay $1.8 million.

In October 2023, O'Neal was named Reebok's President of Basketball.

On Valentine's Day of 2025, O'Neal posted an AI generated video of him marrying, and subsequently having kids with, Marilyn Monroe. This video gained attention, and some controversy due to his stake in Authentic Brands Group, who owns her likeness rights. Some people also likened the post to objectifying Monroe, treating her more like a prop than a person.

In April 2026, it was announced that O'Neal, Authentic Brands Group, and TNT Sports were establishing a professional slam dunk league, Dunkman, in the summer of that year. O'Neal will serve as the league's commissioner.

== Personal life ==
=== Family and relationships ===
O'Neal married Shaunie Nelson on December 26, 2002. The couple have four children, including Shareef and Me'Arah. Shareef played basketball in the NBA G League and Me'Arah plays college basketball for the University of Kentucky. (Note: Attributed to multiple references:) O'Neal has a daughter from a previous relationship and Nelson has a son from a previous relationship, who was adopted by O'Neal. (Note: Attributed to multiple references:) In 2007, O'Neal filed for divorce from Nelson in a Miami-Dade Circuit court. Nelson later said that she and O'Neal were back together and that the divorce petition had been withdrawn. In 2009, Nelson filed for divorce, citing irreconcilable differences. The divorce was finalized in 2011. O'Neal blamed himself for the failed marriage, saying he made mistakes and was "greedy".

O'Neal dated the reality television star Nicole "Hoopz" Alexander from 2010 to 2012, (Note: Attributed to multiple references:) and he dated the model Laticia Rolle from 2014 to 2018. He served as a mentor to Angel Reese, who played college basketball for the LSU Tigers and played in the WNBA for the Chicago Sky and the Atlanta Dream. Reese has described O'Neal as a "father figure". She was the focus of the documentary series The Money Game: LSU on Prime Video, which was produced by O'Neal's Jersey Legends Productions. She became O'Neal's first signee after he became President of Basketball for Reebok.

When Hall of Fame center George Mikan died in 2005, O'Neal extended an offer to his family to pay for the funeral expenses, which they accepted.

=== Education ===
In addition to earning a bachelor's degree from Louisiana State University (LSU) in 2000, O'Neal earned an online MBA degree through the University of Phoenix in 2005 and an Ed.D. degree in Human Resource Development from Barry University in 2012. (Note: Attributed to multiple references:) His doctoral capstone topic at Barry was "The Duality of Humor and Aggression in Leadership Styles". (Note: Attributed to multiple references:) In 2026, O'Neal earned a Master of Arts degree in Liberal Arts from LSU.

In 2009, O'Neal attended the Sportscaster U. training camp at Syracuse University. In 2011, he graduated from the New York Film Academy's Filmmaking Conservatory, where he studied directing and cinematography.

=== Other ===
O'Neal endorsed New Jersey governor Chris Christie in his 2013 reelection bid, and appeared in a television advertisement for him. O'Neal participated in a virtual rally for presidential candidate Joe Biden ahead of the 2020 presidential election, which was the first election in which O'Neal voted. In 2016, O'Neal purchased a 14.3-acre, two-house compound in McDonough, Georgia, for $1.15 million. O'Neal has obstructive sleep apnea.

== Career statistics ==
Legend
GP	Games played	GS	Games started	MPG	Minutes per game
FG%	Field goal percentage	3P%	3-point field goal percentage	FT%	Free throw percentage
RPG	Rebounds per game	APG	Assists per game	SPG	Steals per game
BPG	Blocks per game	PPG	Points per game	**Bold**	Career high
†	Won an NBA championship	*	Led the league

=== NBA ===
==== Regular season ====
Year	Team	GP	GS	MPG	FG%	3P%	FT%	RPG	APG	SPG	BPG	PPG
1992–93	Orlando	**81**	**81**	37.9	.562	.000	.592	**13.9**	1.9	.7	**3.5**	23.4
1993–94	Orlando	**81**	**81**	39.8	.599*	.000	.554	13.2	2.4	**.9**	2.9	29.3
1994–95	Orlando	79	79	37.0	.583	.000	.533	11.4	2.7	**.9**	2.4	29.3*
1995–96	Orlando	54	52	36.0	.573	**.500**	.487	11.0	2.9	.6	2.1	26.6
1996–97	L.A. Lakers	51	51	38.1	.557	.000	.484	12.5	3.1	**.9**	2.9	26.2
1997–98	L.A. Lakers	60	57	36.3	.584*	—	.527	11.4	2.4	.7	2.4	28.3
1998–99	L.A. Lakers	49	49	34.8	.576*	.000	.540	10.7	2.3	.7	1.7	26.3
1999–00†	L.A. Lakers	79	79	**40.0**	.574*	.000	.524	13.6	**3.8**	.5	3.0	**29.7***
2000–01†	L.A. Lakers	74	74	39.5	.572*	.000	.513	12.7	3.7	.6	2.8	28.7
2001–02†	L.A. Lakers	67	66	36.1	.579*	.000	.555	10.7	3.0	.6	2.0	27.2
2002–03	L.A. Lakers	67	66	37.8	.574	—	**.622**	11.1	3.1	.6	2.4	27.5
2003–04	L.A. Lakers	67	67	36.8	.584*	—	.490	11.5	2.9	.5	2.5	21.5
2004–05	Miami	73	73	34.1	.601*	—	.461	10.4	2.7	.5	2.3	22.9
2005–06†	Miami	59	58	30.6	.600*	—	.469	9.2	1.9	.4	1.8	20.0
2006–07	Miami	40	39	28.4	.591	—	.422	7.4	2.0	.2	1.4	17.3
2007–08	Miami	33	33	28.6	.581	—	.494	7.8	1.4	.6	1.6	14.2
2007–08	Phoenix	28	28	28.7	.611	—	.513	10.6	1.7	.5	1.2	12.9
2008–09	Phoenix	75	75	30.0	.609*	.000	.595	8.4	1.7	.6	1.4	17.8
2009–10	Cleveland	53	53	23.4	.566	.000	.496	6.7	1.5	.3	1.2	12.0
2010–11	Boston	37	36	20.3	**.667**	—	.557	4.8	.7	.4	1.1	9.2
Career		1,207	1,197	34.7	.582	.045	.527	10.9	2.5	.6	2.3	23.7
All-Star		12	9	22.8	.551	.000	.452	8.1	1.4	1.1	1.6	16.8

==== Playoffs ====
Year	Team	GP	GS	MPG	FG%	3P%	FT%	RPG	APG	SPG	BPG	PPG
1994	Orlando	3	3	42.0	.511	.000	.471	13.3	2.3	.7	**3.0**	20.7
1995	Orlando	21	21	38.3	.577	.000	.571	11.9	3.3	.9	1.9	25.7
1996	Orlando	12	12	38.3	.606	.000	.393	10.0	**4.6**	.8	1.3	25.8
1997	L.A. Lakers	9	9	36.2	.514	.000	.610	10.6	3.2	.6	1.9	26.9
1998	L.A. Lakers	13	13	38.5	**.612**	.000	.503	10.2	2.9	.5	2.6	30.5
1999	L.A. Lakers	8	8	39.4	.510	.000	.466	11.6	2.3	.9	2.9	26.6
2000†	L.A. Lakers	**23**	**23**	**43.5**	.566	.000	.456	**15.4**	3.1	.6	2.4	**30.7**
2001†	L.A. Lakers	16	16	42.3	.555	.000	.525	**15.4**	3.2	.4	2.4	30.4
2002†	L.A. Lakers	19	19	40.8	.529	.000	.649	12.6	2.8	.5	2.5	28.5
2003	L.A. Lakers	12	12	40.1	.535	.000	.621	14.8	3.7	.6	2.8	27.0
2004	L.A. Lakers	22	22	41.7	.593	.000	.429	13.2	2.5	.3	2.8	21.5
2005	Miami	13	13	33.2	.558	.000	.472	7.8	1.9	.4	1.5	19.4
2006†	Miami	**23**	**23**	33.0	**.612**	.000	.374	9.8	1.7	.5	1.5	18.4
2007	Miami	4	4	30.3	.559	.000	.333	8.5	1.3	.3	1.5	18.8
2008	Phoenix	5	5	30.0	.440	.000	.500	9.2	1.0	**1.0**	2.6	15.2
2010	Cleveland	11	11	22.1	.516	.000	**.660**	5.5	1.4	.2	1.2	11.5
2011	Boston	2	0	6.0	.500	.000	.000	.0	.5	.5	.0	1.0
Career		216	214	37.5	.563	.000	.504	11.6	2.7	.5	2.1	24.3

=== College ===
Year	Team	GP	GS	MPG	FG%	3P%	FT%	RPG	APG	SPG	BPG	PPG
1989–90	Louisiana State	**32**	—	28.2	.573	.000	.556	12.0	**1.9**	1.2	3.6	13.9
1990–91	Louisiana State	28	—	31.5	**.628**	.000	**.638**	**14.7**	1.6	**1.5**	5.0	**27.6**
1991–92	Louisiana State	30	—	**32.0**	.615	.000	.528	14.0	1.5	1.0	**5.2**	24.1
Career		90	—	30.5	.610	.000	.575	13.5	1.7	1.2	4.6	21.6

== Filmography ==
=== Film ===
Year	Title	Role	Notes	Ref.
1994	Blue Chips	Neon Boudeaux		
1996	Kazaam	Kazaam		
1996	Space Jam	Himself	Uncredited; cameo	
1997	Good Burger	Himself		
1997	Steel	John Henry Irons / Steel		
1998	He Got Game	Himself		
2001	The Wash	Norman		
2001	Freddy Got Fingered	Himself		
2004	After the Sunset	Himself		
2006	Scary Movie 4	Himself		
2008	The House Bunny	Himself		
2011	Jack and Jill	Himself		
2012	Thunderstruck	Himself		
2013	Grown Ups 2	Officer Fluzoo		
2013	The Smurfs 2	Smooth Smurf	Voice role	
2014	The Lego Movie	Himself	Voice role	
2014	Blended	Doug		
2018	Show Dogs	Karma	Voice role	
2018	Uncle Drew	Big Fella		
2019	What Men Want	Himself		
2020	Hubie Halloween	DJ Aurora		
2026	Scary Movie	Himself		

=== Television ===
Year	Title	Role	Notes
1992	The Arsenio Hall Show	Himself	
1996	Arliss	Himself	Episode: "A Man of Our Times"
2001	For Your Love	Himself	Episode:" The Model Client"
2001	My Wife and Kids	Himself	2 Episodes
2001	Jackass	Himself	Episode: "The Bed Wetter"
2001	Curb Your Enthusiasm	Himself	Episode: "Shaq"
2002	Static Shock	Himself	Episode: "Static Shaq"
2002–04	The Parkers	Himself	2 Episodes
2003	The Bernie Mac Show	Himself	Episode: "Eye of the Tiger"
2004	The Tracy Morgan Show	Himself	Episode: "Career Day"
2004	Johnny Bravo	Himself	Episode: "Back on Shaq"
2005	Shaquille	Himself	
2005	Punk'd	Himself	
2007	American Idol	Himself	Episode: "Idol Gives Back"
2009	Shaq Vs.	Himself	
2009	WWE Raw	Himself	Episode: "Raw 844 – July 27, 2009"
2010	Sonny with a Chance	Himself	Episode: "A So Random! Halloween Special"
2011	The Cleveland Show	Himself	Episode: "A Short Story and a Tall Tale"
2011	Fear Factor	Himself	1 episode
2013	Real Husbands of Hollywood	Himself	Episode: "Retreat for Couples"
2013, 2017	Jimmy Kimmel Live!	Himself	2 Episodes as guest, Guest Host October 30, 2017
2013	Southland	Detective Earl Dayton	Episode: "The Felix Paradox"
2013	Upload with Shaquille O'Neal	Himself	
2014	Uncle Grandpa	Himself	Episode: "The Perfect Kid"
2015	Highston	Himself	Episode: "Pilot"
2015–16	Fresh Off the Boat	Himself	2 Episodes
2015	Off to School	Himself	Episodes 59–62
2016	Lip Sync Battle	Himself	Episode: "Shaquille O'Neal vs. Aisha Tyler"
2016	Pickle and Peanut	90s Adventure Bear	2 Episodes
2017	The Simpsons	Himself	Episode: "Gone Boy"
2018	Drop the Mic	Himself	Episode "Shaquille O'Neal vs. Ken Jeong / Jerry Springer vs. Ricki Lake"
2018	Shaq Does Shark Week	Himself	Television documentary film
2020	Rock & Roll Road Trip with Sammy Hagar	Himself	Episode: "Viva Def Vegas"
2020	Graduate Together: America Honors the High School Class of 2020	Himself	Television special
2020	Home Movie: The Princess Bride	Fezzik	Episode: "Ultimate Suffering"
2020–present	Shaq Life	Himself	Main role
2022	Legacy: The True Story of the LA Lakers	Himself	Documentary series
2024	Lucky 13	Co-host	Game show; also executive producer

=== Music videos ===
Year	Title	Artist(s)	Ref.
2010	"Vanilla Twilight"	Owl City	
2018	"My Cloud"	Grabbitz	
2021	"Todo de Ti"	Rauw Alejandro	

=== Video games ===
Year	Title	Voice role	Notes	Ref.
1994	Shaq Fu	Shaq Fei Hung		
2018	Shaq Fu: A Legend Reborn	Shaq Fei Hung		

== Discography ==
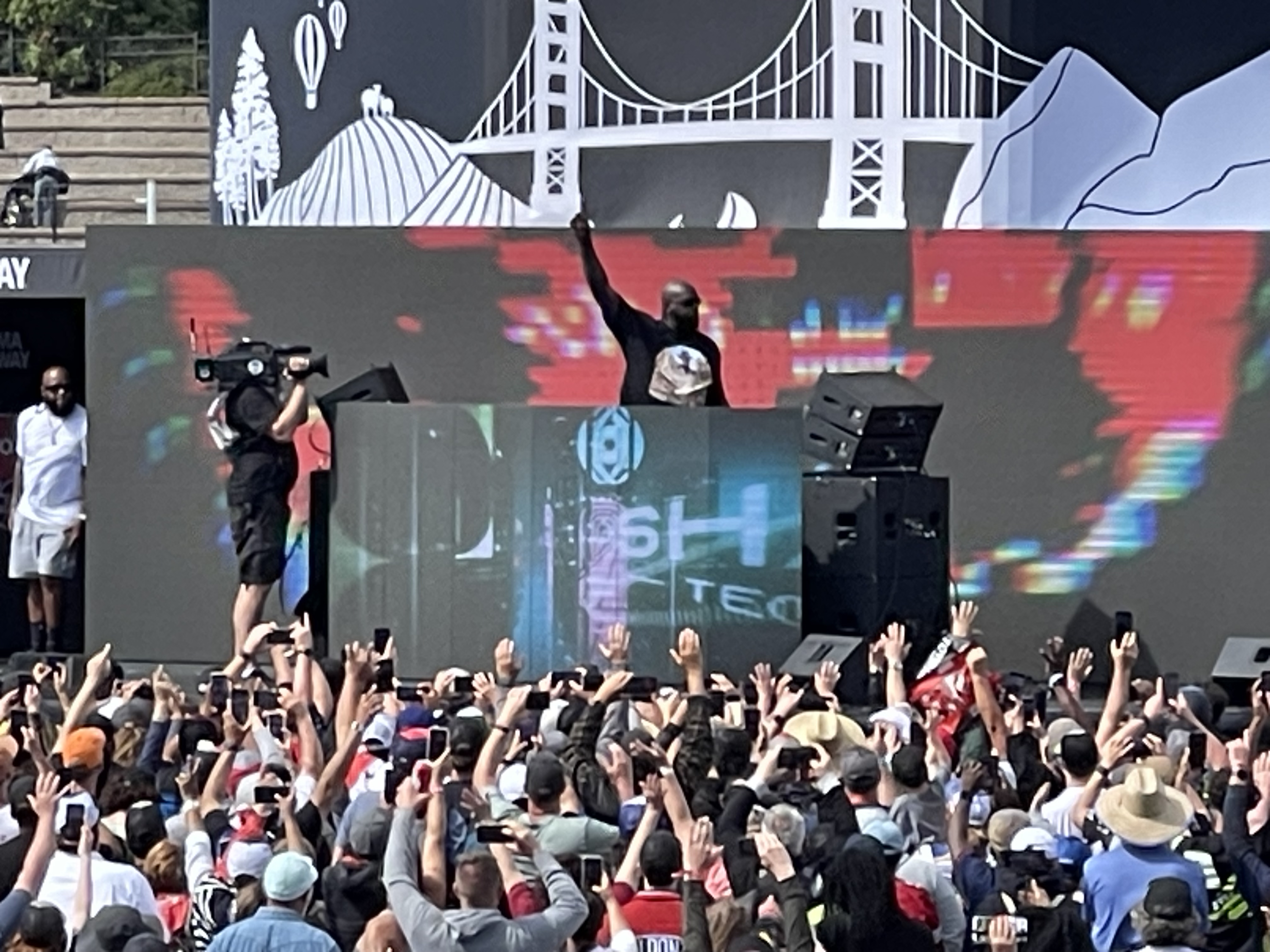
O'Neal performing at the 2023 Toyota/Save Mart 350 in Sonoma, California

=== Studio albums ===
- Shaq Diesel (1993)
- Shaq Fu: Da Return (1994)
- You Can't Stop the Reign (1996)
- Respect (1998)
- Gorilla Warfare (as Diesel) (2023)

=== Unreleased albums ===
- Shaquille O'Neal Presents His Superfriends, Vol. 1 (2001)

== Bibliography ==
- Shaq Attaq! (1994)
- A Good Reason to Look Up (1998)
- Shaq and the Beanstalk and Other Very Tall Tales (1999)
- Shaq Talks Back (2002 autobiography)
- Shaq Uncut: My Story (2011)
- Little Shaq (2015)
- Little Shaq Takes a Chance (2016)
- Little Shaq: Star of the Week (2016)
- Shaq's Family Style (2022)

== Accolades ==
=== Awards and honors ===
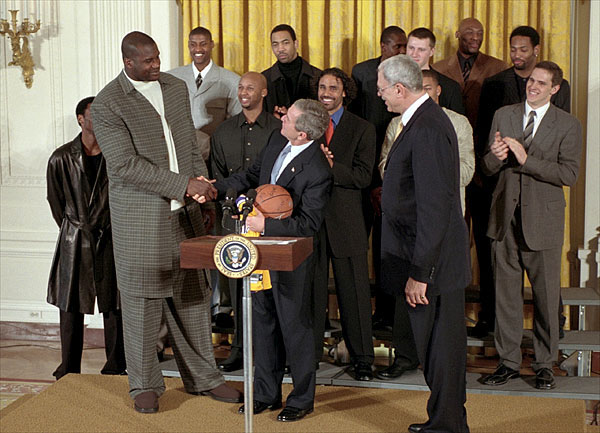
O'Neal and the Los Angeles Lakers with President George W. Bush at a White House January 2002 ceremony commemorating the team's 2001 NBA Championship

NBA

- 4× NBA champion (2000–2002, 2006)
- 3× NBA Finals MVP (2000–2002)
- NBA Most Valuable Player (2000)
- 15× NBA All-Star (1993–1998, 2000–2007, 2009)
- 3× NBA All-Star Game MVP (2000, 2004, 2009)
- 14x All-NBA Team selections:
  - 8× All-NBA First Team (1998, 2000–2006)
  - 2× All-NBA Second Team (1995, 1999)
  - 4× All-NBA Third Team (1994, 1996, 1997, 2009)
- 3× NBA All-Defensive Second Team (2000, 2001, 2003)
- NBA Rookie of the Year (1993)
- NBA All-Rookie First Team (1993)
- 2× NBA scoring champion (1995, 2000)
- 10× NBA field goal percentage leader (1994, 1998, 1999, 2000, 2001, 2002, 2004, 2005, 2006, 2009)
- 2× IBM Award (1999–2000, 2000–01)
- NBA anniversary team (50th, 75th)
- No. 34 retired by Los Angeles Lakers
- No. 32 retired by Miami Heat
- No. 32 retired by Orlando Magic
- Statue of Shaquille O'Neal outside Crypto.com Arena

USA Basketball

- 1996 Olympic Gold Medal
- 1994 FIBA Basketball World Cup Gold Medal
- 1994 FIBA World Cup MVP
- 1994 FIBA Basketball World Cup All-Tournament Team
- 1994 USA Basketball Male Athlete of the Year

NCAA

- 1990–1991 SEC Regular Season Co-Champion
- Associated Press Player of the Year (1991)
- UPI Player of the Year (1991)
- Adolph Rupp Trophy (1991)
- 2× Consensus first-team All-American (1991, 1992)
  - 2× Associated Press first-team All-American (1991, 1992)
  - 2× USBWA first-team All-American (1991, 1992)
  - 2× NABC first-team All-American (1991, 1992)
  - 2× UPI first-team All-American (1991, 1992)
- NCAA rebounding leader (1991)
- NCAA blocks leader (1992)
- 2× SEC Male Athlete of the Year (1991, 1992)
- 2× SEC Player of the Year (1991, 1992)
- 3× First-team All-SEC (1990, 1991, 1992)
- LSU All-Century Team (2009)
- No. 33 retired by LSU Tigers
- Statue of Shaquille O'Neal outside the LSU Basketball Practice Facility

High school

- McDonald's All-American Game Co-MVP (1989)
- First-team Parade All-American (1989)
- Texas Mr. Basketball (1989)
- Selected as one of the 35 Greatest McDonald's All-Americans: 2012

Media

- ESPN American Athlete of the Year (1995)
- 2× Sporting News NBA MVP (2000, 2005)
- Sporting News Rookie of the Year (1993)
- Sporting News NBA 1990s All-Decade Third Team
- Sporting News NBA 2000s All-Decade First Team
- AP NBA 2000s All-Decade First Team
- BET Sportsman of the Year (2005)
- ESPY Awards
  - 2× Best NBA Player (2001, 2002)
  - 1993 Outstanding Performance by a Sports Personality in an Attempt to Break into Show Business – Shaquille O'Neal raps with Fu-Schnickens on The Arsenio Hall Show
- Harold & Carole Pump Foundation – Lifetime Achievement Award (2013)

Sports Emmy Awards

- 2012 – Outstanding Promotional Announcement

Academy Awards

- 2022 – Short Subject Documentary (as an executive producer of The Queen of Basketball)

Halls of Fame

- New Jersey Hall of Fame – Class of 2009
- Naismith Memorial Basketball Hall of Fame – Class of 2016
- National Collegiate Basketball Hall of Fame – Class of 2014
- FIBA Hall of Fame – Class of 2017
- Louisiana Sports Hall of Fame – Class of 2013
- LSU Athletic Hall of Fame – Class of 2000
- San Antonio Sports Hall of Fame – Class of 2016

=== Awards and nominations ===
Year	Nominated work	Category	Result
CableACE Awards
1996	Sports Theater with Shaquille O'Neal	Children's Special – 7 and Older	Won
Golden Raspberry Awards
1995	Blue Chips	Worst New Star	Nominated
1998	Steel	Worst Actor	Nominated
2015	Blended	Worst Supporting Actor	Nominated

== See also ==
- Highest-paid NBA players by season
- List of NBA annual scoring leaders
- List of NBA career blocks leaders
- List of NBA career field goal percentage leaders
- List of NBA career free throw scoring leaders
- List of NBA career minutes played leaders
- List of NBA career personal fouls leaders
- List of NBA career playoff blocks leaders
- List of NBA career playoff free throw scoring leaders
- List of NBA career playoff games played leaders
- List of NBA career playoff rebounding leaders
- List of NBA career playoff scoring leaders
- List of NBA career playoff turnovers leaders
- List of NBA career rebounding leaders
- List of NBA career scoring leaders
- List of NBA career turnovers leaders
- List of NBA rookie single-season scoring leaders
- List of NBA seasons played leaders
- List of NBA single-game blocks leaders
- List of NBA single-game scoring leaders
