= 1992 NCAA Men's Basketball All-Americans =

- Awarded for: 1991–92 NCAA Division I men's basketball season

The Consensus 1992 College Basketball All-American team, as determined by aggregating the results of four major All-American teams. To earn "consensus" status, a player must win honors from a majority of the following teams: the Associated Press, the USBWA, The United Press International and the National Association of Basketball Coaches.

== 1992 Consensus All-America team ==
Consensus First Team
Player	Position	Class	Team
Jimmy Jackson	G/F	Junior	Ohio State
Christian Laettner	F	Senior	Duke
Harold Miner	G	Junior	Southern California
Alonzo Mourning	C	Senior	Georgetown
Shaquille O'Neal	C	Junior	LSU

Consensus Second Team
Player	Position	Class	Team
Byron Houston	F	Senior	Oklahoma State
Don MacLean	F	Senior	UCLA
Anthony Peeler	G	Senior	Missouri
Malik Sealy	G/F	Senior	St. John's
Walt Williams	G	Senior	Maryland

== Individual All-America teams ==
All-America Team
All-America Team	First team		Second team		Third team	
All-America Team	Player	School	Player	School	Player	School
Associated Press	Jimmy Jackson	Ohio State	Byron Houston	Oklahoma State	Calbert Cheaney	Indiana
Associated Press	Christian Laettner	Duke	Adam Keefe	Stanford	Todd Day	Arkansas
Associated Press	Harold Miner	Southern California	Don MacLean	UCLA	Bobby Hurley	Duke
Associated Press	Alonzo Mourning	Georgetown	Anthony Peeler	Missouri	Lee Mayberry	Arkansas
Associated Press	Shaquille O'Neal	LSU	Walt Williams	Maryland	Malik Sealy	St. John's
USBWA	Jimmy Jackson	Ohio State	Byron Houston	Oklahoma State	No third team	
USBWA	Christian Laettner	Duke	Don MacLean	UCLA	No third team	
USBWA	Harold Miner	Southern California	Anthony Peeler	Missouri	No third team	
USBWA	Alonzo Mourning	Georgetown	Malik Sealy	St. John's	No third team	
USBWA	Shaquille O'Neal	LSU	Walt Williams	Maryland	No third team	
NABC	Bobby Hurley	Duke	Todd Day	Arkansas	Calbert Cheaney	Indiana
NABC	Jimmy Jackson	Ohio State	Byron Houston	Oklahoma State	Tom Gugliotta	North Carolina State
NABC	Christian Laettner	Duke	Don MacLean	UCLA	Allan Houston	Tennessee
NABC	Harold Miner	Southern California	Alonzo Mourning	Georgetown	Adam Keefe	Stanford
NABC	Shaquille O'Neal	LSU	Anthony Peeler	Missouri	Lee Mayberry	Arkansas
UPI	Jimmy Jackson	Ohio State	Grant Hill	Duke	Calbert Cheaney	Indiana
UPI	Christian Laettner	Duke	Byron Houston	Oklahoma State	Todd Day	Arkansas
UPI	Harold Miner	Southern California	Anthony Peeler	Missouri	Bobby Hurley	Duke
UPI	Alonzo Mourning	Georgetown	Malik Sealy	St. John's	Adam Keefe	Stanford
UPI	Shaquille O'Neal	LSU	Walt Williams	Maryland	Don MacLean	UCLA

AP Honorable Mention:

- Damon Bailey, Indiana
- Vin Baker, Hartford
- Tony Bennett, Wisconsin–Green Bay
- Nathan Call, BYU
- Sam Cassell, Florida State
- Parrish Casebier, Evansville
- Doug Christie, Pepperdine
- Hubert Davis, North Carolina
- Terry Dehere, Seton Hall
- Acie Earl, Iowa
- LaPhonso Ellis, Notre Dame
- Tom Gugliotta, North Carolina State
- Penny Hardaway, Memphis State
- Grant Hill, Duke
- Robert Horry, Alabama
- Allan Houston, Tennessee
- Alonzo Jamison, Kansas
- Herb Jones, Cincinnati
- Popeye Jones, Murray State
- Adonis Jordan, Kansas
- Terrell Lowery, Loyola Marymount
- Jamal Mashburn, Kentucky
- Jim McCoy, Massachusetts
- Chris Mills, Arizona
- Oliver Miller, Arkansas
- Eric Montross, North Carolina
- Tracy Murray, UCLA
- Terrence Rencher, Texas
- Sean Rooks, Arizona
- Rodney Rogers, Wake Forest
- Jalen Rose, Michigan
- Reggie Slater, Wyoming
- Chris Smith, Connecticut
- Elmore Spencer, UNLV
- Bryant Stith, Virginia
- Rex Walters, Kansas
- Clarence Weatherspoon, Southern Mississippi
- Henry Williams, UNC Charlotte
- Randy Woods, La Salle
