= LSU Basketball Practice Facility =

Arena in Baton Rouge, Louisiana, USA

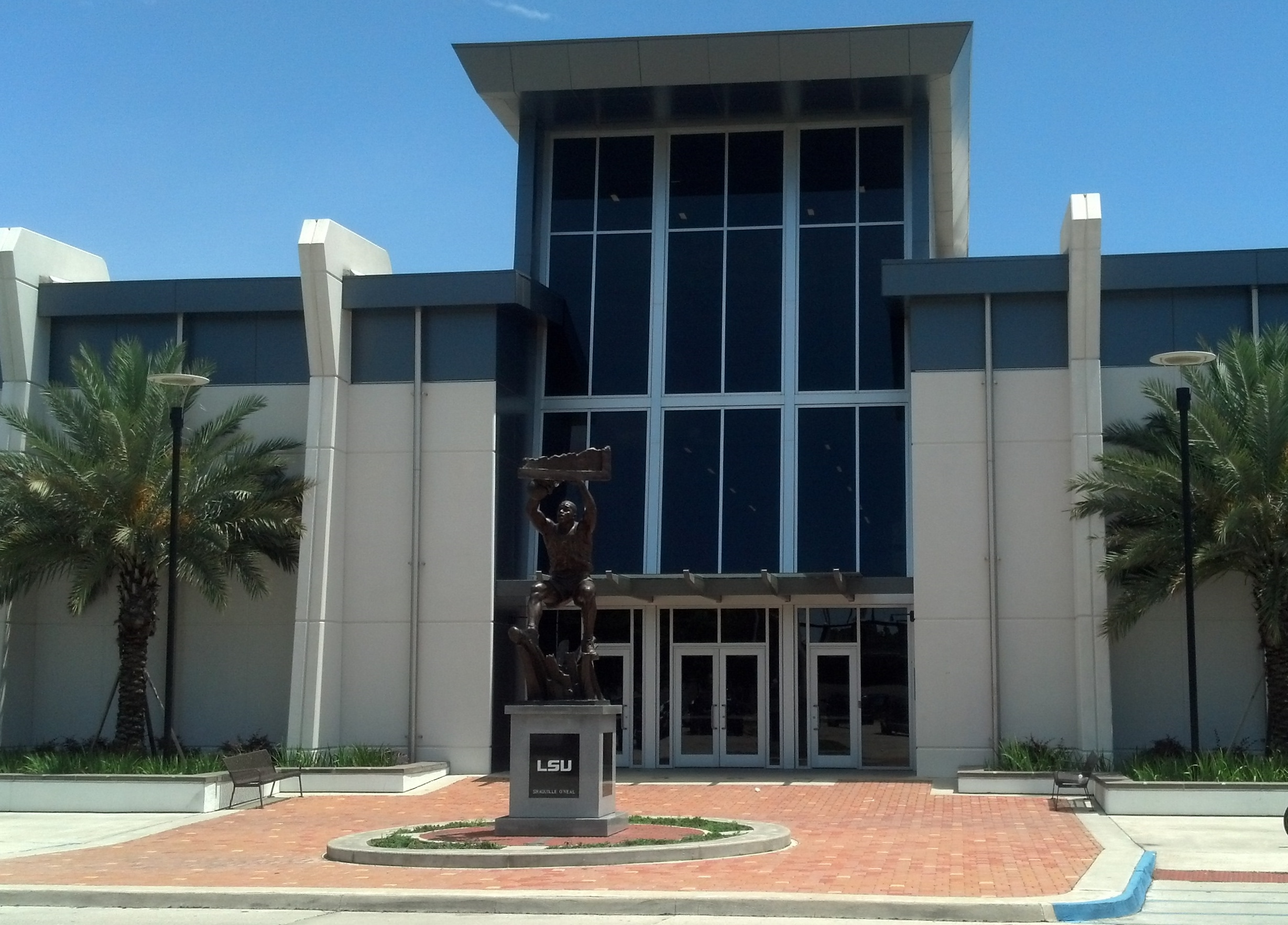
- Interactive map of LSU Basketball Practice Facility
- Location: Baton Rouge, Louisiana 70803; USA
- Coordinates: 30.4151°N 91.1846°W
- Owner: Louisiana State University
- Operator: LSU Athletics Department
- Capacity: 1600 (800 each gym)
- Surface: Hardwood

Construction
- Groundbreaking: 2008
- Opened: 2010
- Cost: $15 million
- Architects: Tom Holden Architects and RDG Sports

Tenants
- LSU Tigers basketball (NCAA); LSU Lady Tigers basketball (NCAA)

The LSU Tigers basketball and Lady Tigers Basketball Practice Facility is an indoor arena connected to the Pete Maravich Assembly Center through the Northwest portal. The facility features separate, full-size duplicate gymnasiums for the men's and women's basketball teams. Each gym spans 11,324 square feet (1,052.0 m^{2}) and includes a regulation NCAA court in length with two regulation high school courts in the opposition direction. The courts are exact replicas of the Maravich Center game court and have two portable goals and four retractable goals. Each gymnasium is equipped with a scoreboard, video filming balcony, and scorer's table with video and data connection that enable instant replay. The facility also houses team locker rooms, a team lounge, training rooms, coach's offices and locker rooms, a media room, laundry facility and storage areas.

The building also includes a two-story lobby and staircase that ascends to the second level where a club room holds 500 people for pre-game and post-game events. The club room is connected to the Pete Maravich Assembly Center concourse. The lobby includes team displays and graphics, trophy cases and memorabilia of LSU Basketball. A 900-pound bronze statue of LSU legend Shaquille O'Neal is in front of the facility.

== Gallery ==
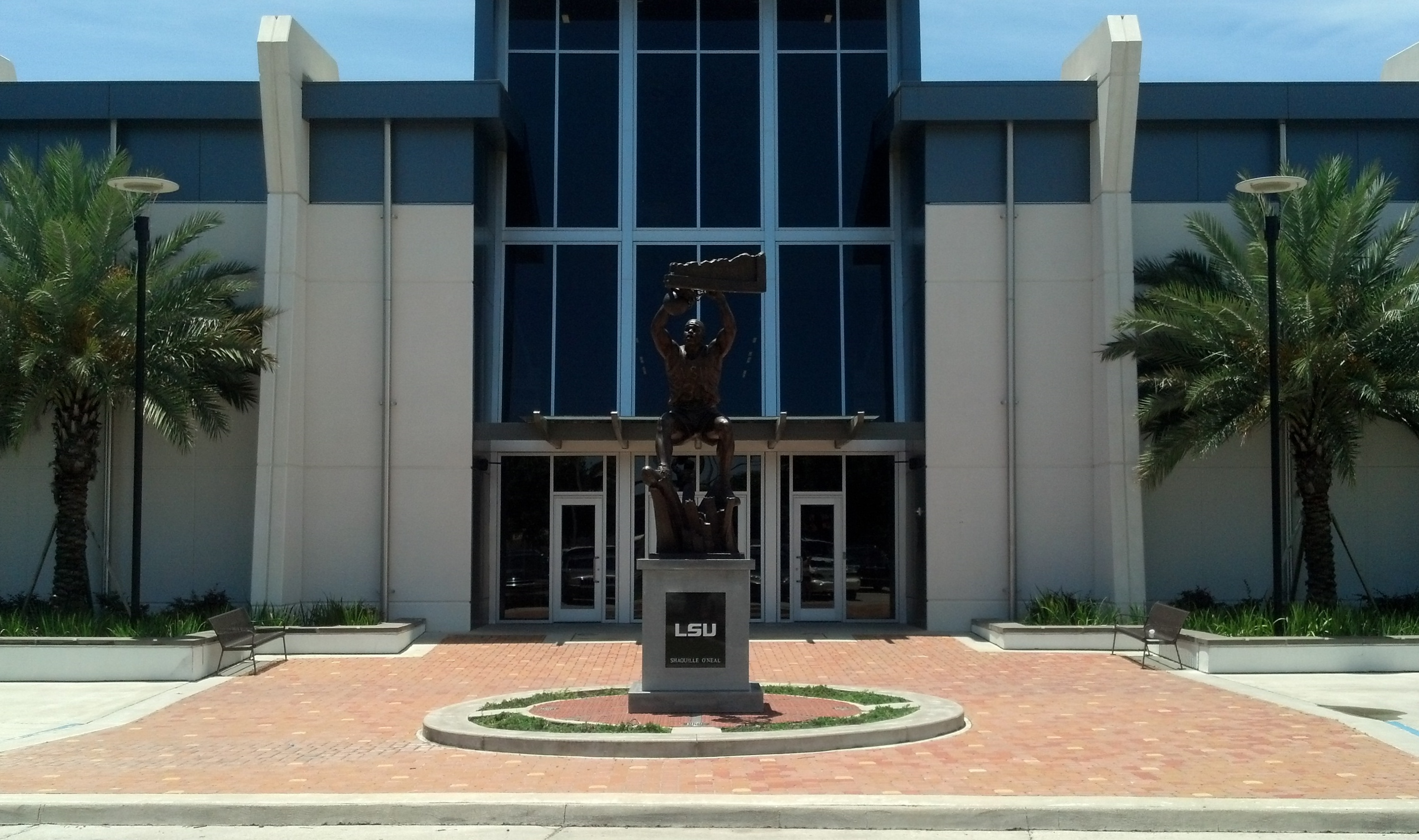
LSU Basketball Practice Facility

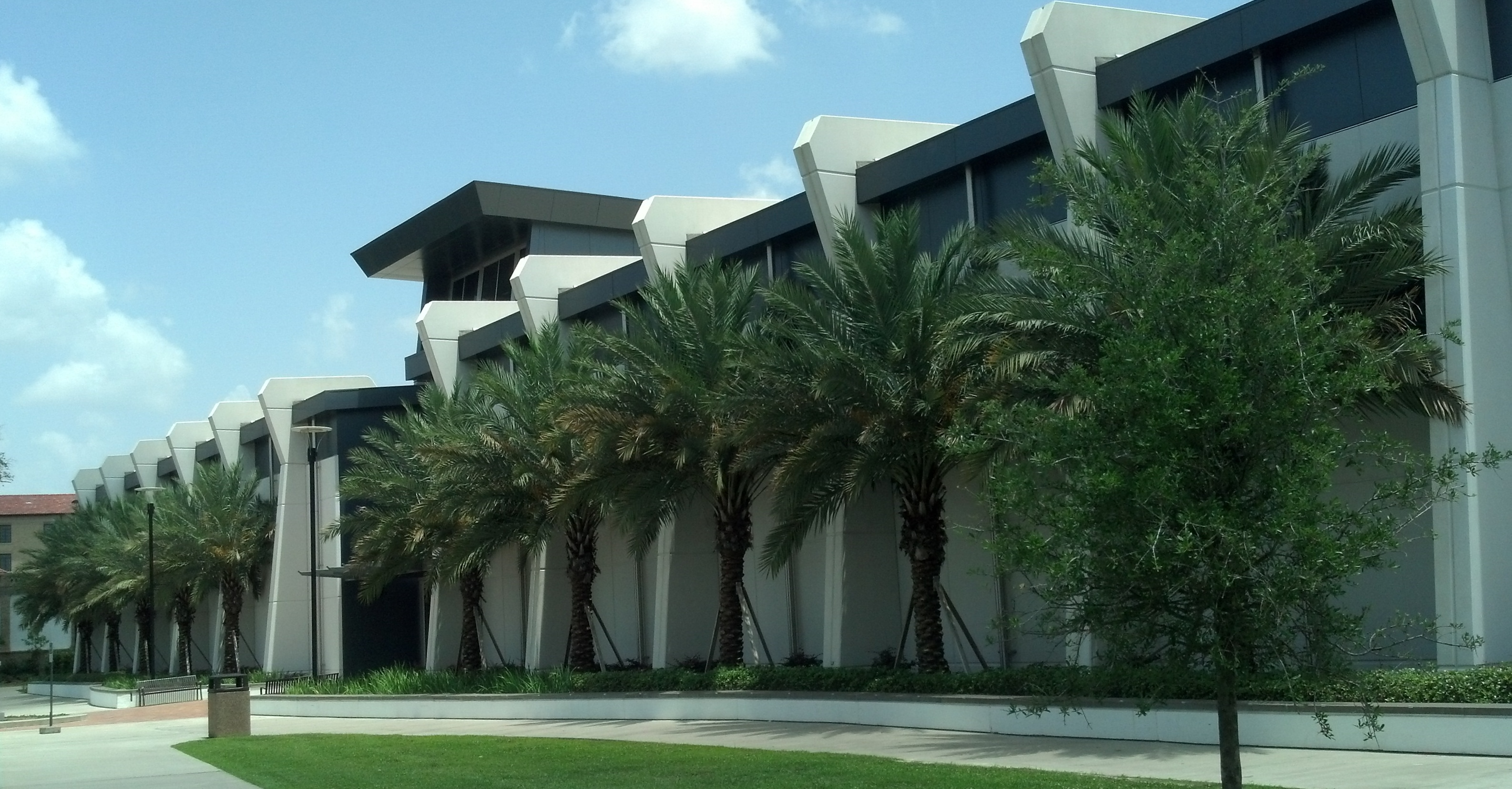
LSU Basketball Practice Facility Building

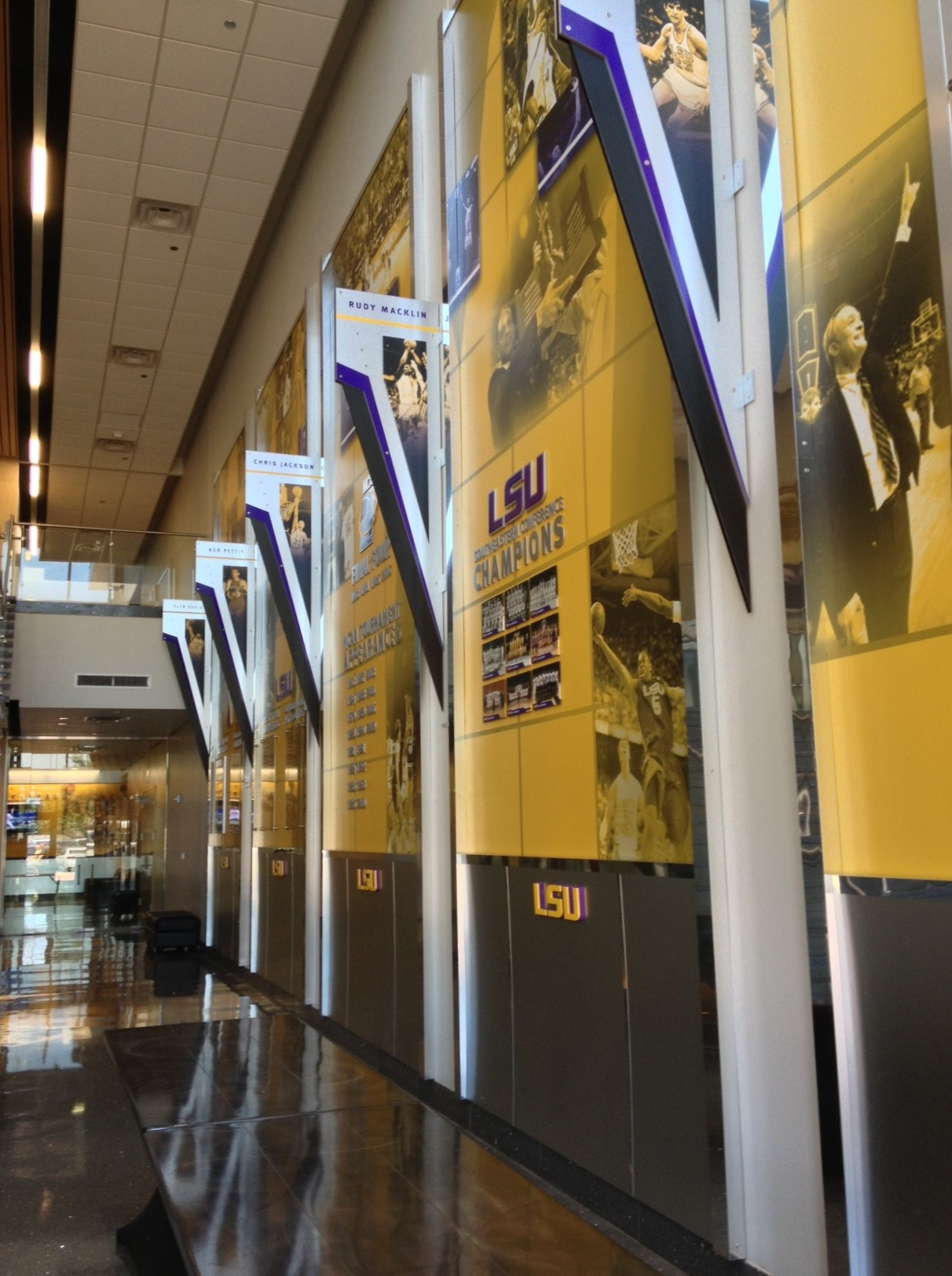
LSU Basketball Practice Facility - Lobby

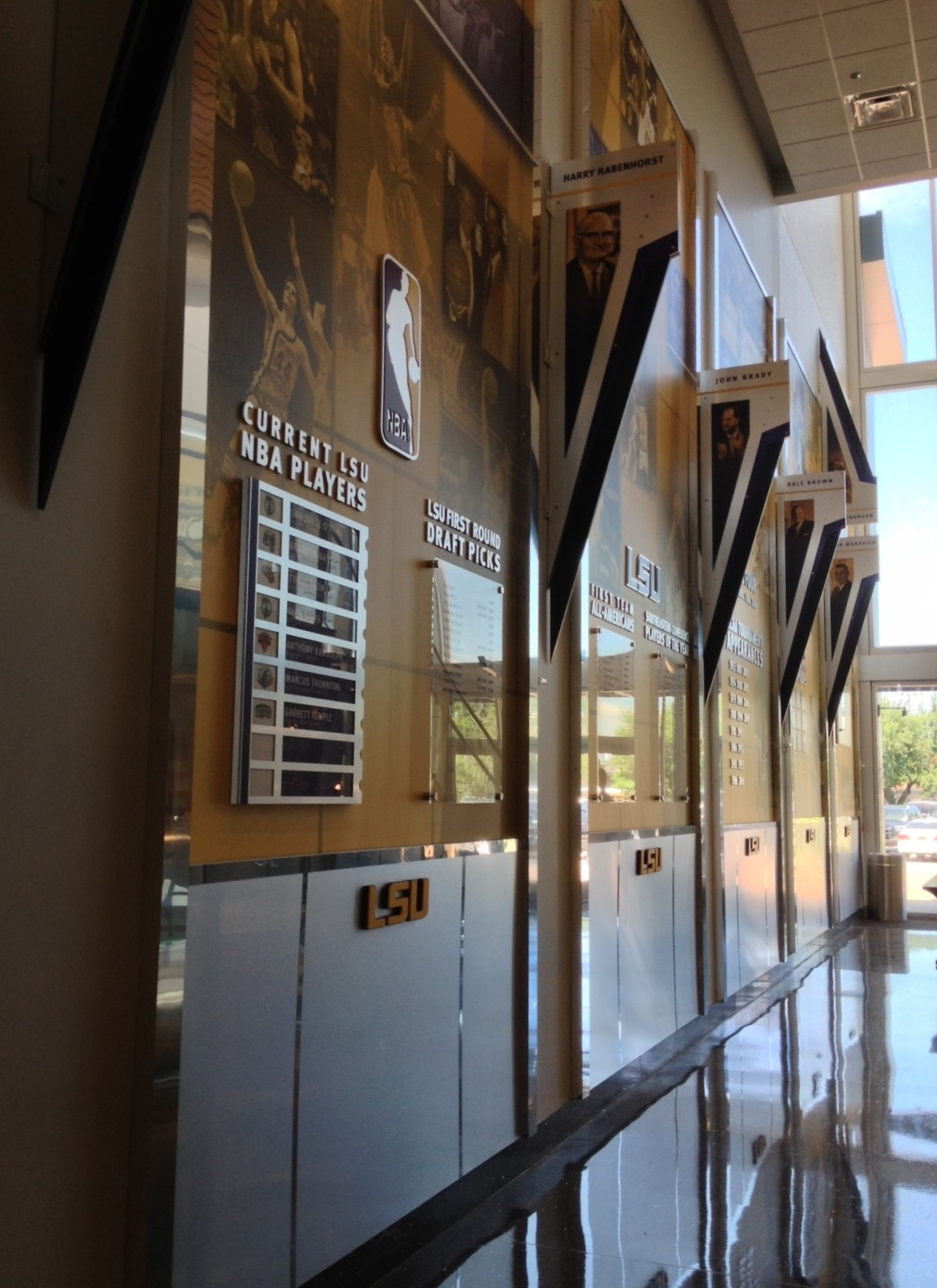
LSU Basketball Practice Facility - Lobby View from Practice Court

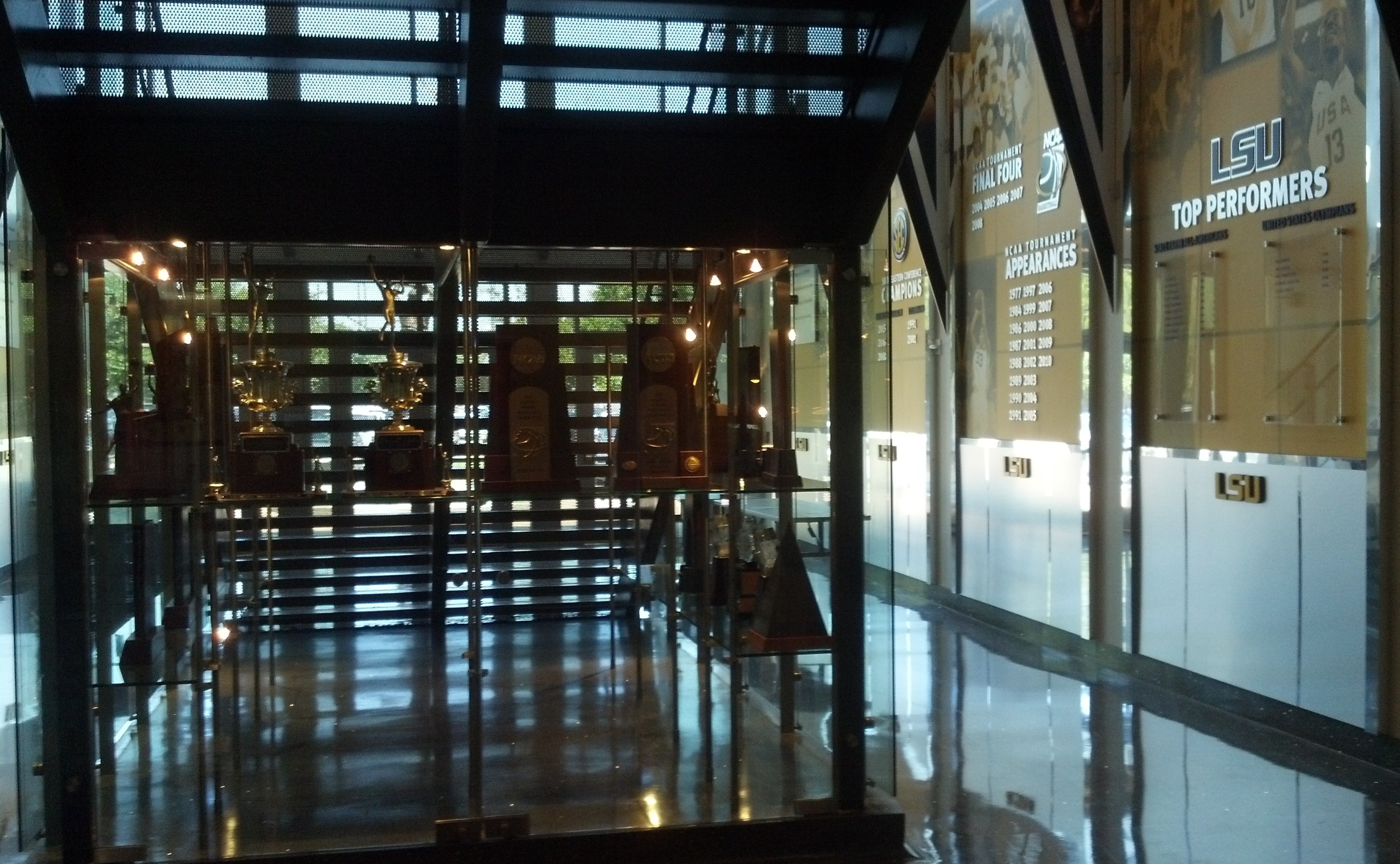
LSU Basketball Practice Facility - Trophy Case
