= Mary Mazzio =

American film director

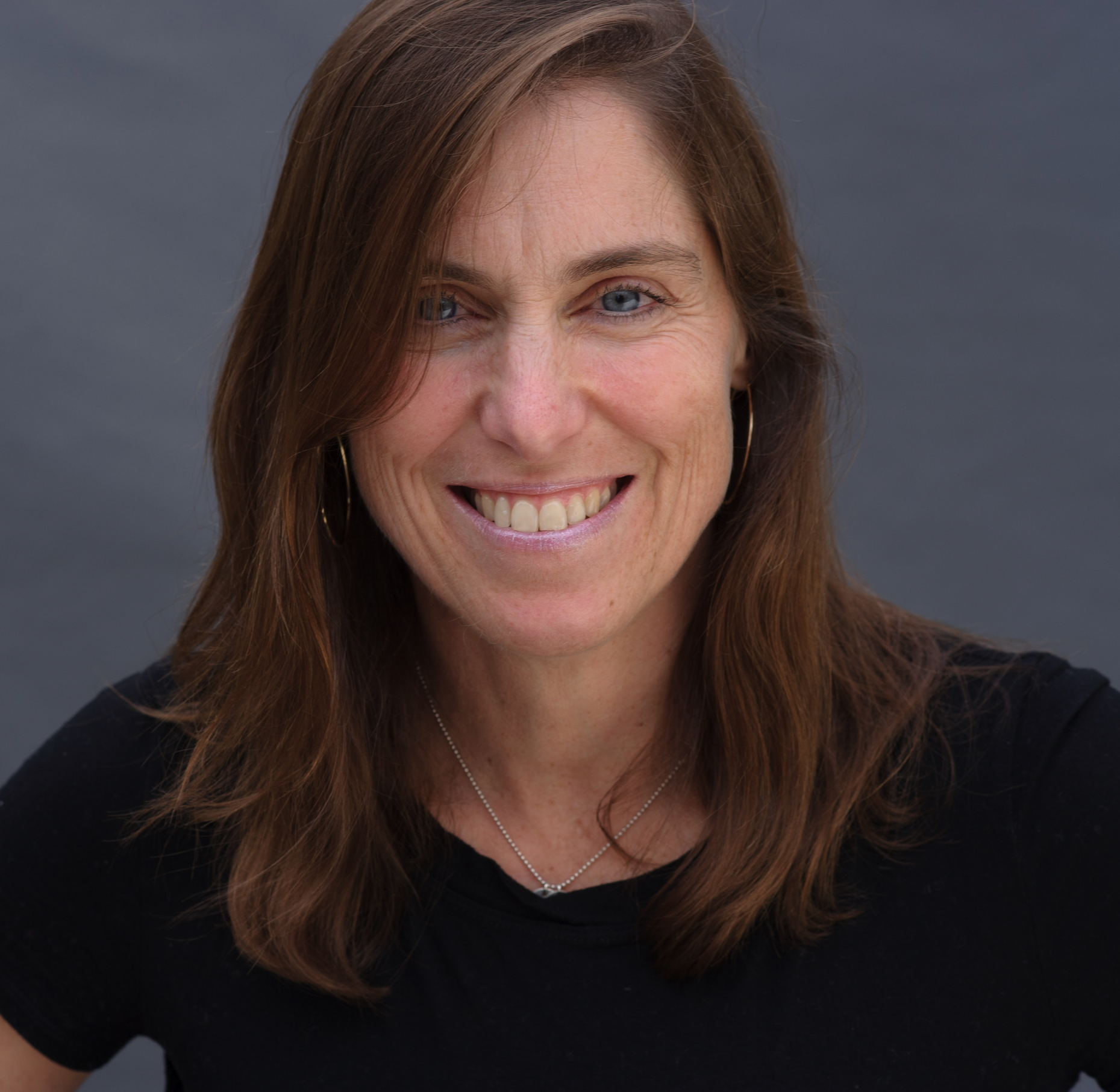
- Education: Mount Holyoke College; Georgetown Law; Boston University
- Website: 50eggs.com

Mary Mazzio is an American documentary filmmaker, attorney, and a rower for the United States in the 1992 Olympics. She founded the independent film company 50 Eggs.

Mazzio wrote, directed, and produced MIGHTY MARY, narrated and executive produced by Hugh Jackman and Elizabeth Banks. Called “thrilling” (Oprah Daily), “an edge of your seat blast” (The Wrap), “inspired” (USA Today), and “brilliant” (PBS Radio), the film recounts the story of a ground-breaking women’s sailing team which contended for the famed America’s Cup, the holy grail for one of sport’s most elite and exclusive events. The film, winner of Maria Mitchell Award, was produced in partnership with Skydance Sports, opened theatrically across the country in September of 2026 with AMC Theatres and will be distributed by Paramount/Republic Pictures.

Mazzio’s previous film, BAD RIVER, narrated by Quannah ChasingHorse and Academy-Award nominee, Edward Norton, chronicles the Wisconsin-based Bad River Band and its legacy of defiance and resilience, including a David vs. Goliath battle to save Lake Superior, the largest freshwater resource in America. Nominated for three Critic Choice Awards and featured in The New Yorker crossword puzzle, the film is currently streaming on Peacock.

She is the recipient of several awards including an honorary degree from Mount Holyoke College; the Ricky Martin Foundation Humanitarian Award; two Gracie Awards; four Critic’s Choice Award nominations; an NAACP Image Award nomination; an EMA Award, an International Climate Impact nomination by the US Olympic Committee; the Hope Award (from the National Center for Missing and Exploited Children); a Women's Sports Foundation Journalism Award; a Henry Luce Foundation Fellowship (to Korea); a Rotary Foundation Graduate Fellowship (to France); and an American Heritage Award (from the American Immigration Council).

Mazzio received a B.A. in philosophy and political science from Mount Holyoke College in 1983 and a J.D. from Georgetown Law. She studied film production as a graduate student at Boston University. She was a former partner with the international law firm Brown Rudnick in Boston. Mary has served on several Boards, including Sojourner House; The Boston Youth Symphony Orchestras; The Head of the Charles Regatta; The National Rowing Foundation; The A Most Beautiful Thing Inclusion Fund; and World T.E.A.M Sports. Mary was recently inducted into the Mount Holyoke College Athletics Hall of Fame. The Schlesinger Library at Harvard University has requested all of her papers for its collection.

== Additional Films ==
=== A Hero For Daisy (1999) ===
Her 1999 film, A Hero for Daisy, called "a landmark film" by The New York Times, is about Title IX pioneer and two-time Olympian Chris Ernst, who (in 1976) led her Yale University rowing team in a protest that increased athletic opportunities for women. This film, which won a Gracie and a Women's Foundation Journalism Award, aired nationwide on ESPN, Oxygen, and WTSN (Canada), was invited to screen at The Smithsonian, and is in thousands of classrooms across the nation.

=== Apple Pie (2002) ===
Apple Pie, which was broadcast on ESPN, chronicles extraordinary athletes and their mothers, including Drew Bledsoe, Mia Hamm, Shaquille O'Neal, Grant Hill, Kenny Lofton, and others. The film was called "illuminating... told with deftness and emotion...priceless" by The New York Times.

=== Lemonade Stories (2004) ===
Lemonade Stories, featuring Richard Branson, Arthur Blank, Russell Simmons, Tom Scott and other entrepreneurs, was the subject of a USA Today cover story, broadcast on CNNfn and is being shown throughout the world on television and in classrooms, board rooms, business schools, and consulting firms.

=== Ten9Eight: Shoot for the Moon (2009) ===
TEN9EIGHT tells the inspirational stories of several inner city teens who discover the power of entrepreneurship and compete in a national business plan competition. The title, TEN9EIGHT, refers to the fact that every 9 seconds a teen drops out of a U.S. high school. TEN9EIGHT was released in the fall of 2009 in a first-of-its-kind partnership with AMC Theatres in New York, LA, Washington DC, Boston, Chicago, Atlanta, Miami and Kansas City. BET and CENTRIC networks broadcast TEN9EIGHT initially on February 7, 2010, as part of Viacom's GET SCHOOLED initiative with the Gates Foundation. The broadcast coincided with a special screening at the White House Summit hosted by the US Department of Education and the Library of Congress, as well as the release of a companion book to the film, Teens Blast Off, published by Scholastic. New York Times columnist Tom Friedman said this about TEN9EIGHT: "Obama should arrange for this movie to be shown in every classroom in America. It is the most inspirational, heartwarming film you will ever see." The film was also called "inspiring… should be compulsory viewing in high schools around the country" (Lael Lowenstein, Variety), "very well made" (Mike Hale, The New York Times) and "important," (Marshall Fine, Huffington Post). The film was named by Take Part as one of the 10 best documentary films on education. Also selected as a finalist of VH1's "Do Something" Awards.

=== The Apple Pushers (2011) ===
The Apple Pushers, written and directed by Mary Mazzio, narrated by Academy Award nominee Edward Norton, and underwritten by the Laurie M. Tisch Illumination Fund, follows immigrant street vendors who are rolling fresh fruits and vegetables into the inner cities of New York. These pushcart vendors, who have immigrated here from all parts of the world for different reasons, and who have sacrificed to come to this country (a near fatal crossing of the Mexican border, as an example) – are now part of a new experiment in New York to help solve the food crisis and skyrocketing obesity rates in the inner city.

The film had a special screening at the Aspen Ideas Festival where thought leaders and policy makers, including Robin Schepper (the head of Mrs. Obama's "Let's Move" campaign), discussed the film and the issues of how to tackle the obesity crisis in low-income neighborhoods across the country. In addition, Kathleen Merrigan, Deputy Secretary of the USDA, hosted a special screening of The Apple Pushers at the Motion Picture Association in Washington DC for policy leaders, heads of federal agencies, and others in a position to help spread the message of the film - which is to think creatively about pushing back the borders of food deserts.

=== Contrarian (2013) ===
Narrated by Fred Dalton Thompson and directed by Mary Mazzio, Contrarian chronicles the life of philanthropist and legendary investor, John Templeton, who ranks among the top investors of all time, alongside Warren Buffett and Peter Lynch. In fact, long before Buffett and Lynch were on the radar, thousands of people were trekking to Templeton's annual meetings – making Templeton the first true rock star investor. Broadcast on Bloomberg Television nationwide and internationally throughout Asia.

=== Underwater Dreams (2014) ===
Underwater Dreams, written and directed by Mary Mazzio, and narrated by Michael Peña, is the epic story of how the sons of undocumented Mexican immigrants learned how to build an underwater robot from Home Depot parts. And defeat engineering powerhouse MIT in the process.

Hailed by Jonathan Alter as "the most politically significant documentary film since Waiting for Superman (The Daily Beast); featured on the Colbert Report; called "astonishing... already a contender for the best documentary of 2014″ (David Noh, Film Journal); "moving and insightful" (Gary Goldstein, Los Angeles Times), and named one of the Best Family Movies of 2014 by Common Sense Media, alongside Selma and Birdman; Underwater Dreams was released theatrically in Los Angeles, New York, and Phoenix with AMC Theatres.

This film screened at the White House, coming on the heels of a new coalition of corporate funders, educational institutions and non-profits, all galvanized together to fund STEM education for under-represented students. Called the Let Everyone Dream Coalition, the film has raised approximately $100 million.

=== I Am Jane Doe (2017) ===
I am Jane Doe chronicles the legal battle that several American mothers are waging on behalf of their middle-school daughters, who were trafficked for commercial sex on Backpage.com, the classified advertising website formerly owned by the Village Voice. Reminiscent of Erin Brockovich and Karen Silkwood, these mothers have stood up on behalf of thousands of other mothers, fighting back and refusing to take no for an answer.

Narrated by Academy Award-nominee Jessica Chastain, directed by award-winning filmmaker Mary Mazzio, and produced by Mazzio along with Academy Award-nominee Alec Sokolow, I Am Jane Doe is a human story looking at a social and legal issue affecting every community in America.

Called "a gripping legal thriller" (Esquire); "a powerful call to action" (The Los Angeles Times); "a viscerally emotional case (The Washington Post); "especially impressive…a powerful piece of work" (Elle Magazine); and "striking…powerful" (The Film Journal), the film was also highlighted in The New Yorker, Vogue, Cosmo, and People Magazine (Part 1, Part 2, and Part 3).

The film has catalyzed extraordinary activity, including new legislation (on a bipartisan basis) signed by the President in the spring of 2018; investigative reporting into the links between Google and Backpage; and a federal criminal probe of Backpage executives, resulting in a 93-count indictment.

=== I Am Little Red (2017) ===
I am Little Red is a 10-minute animated short aimed at children most at-risk for sex trafficking (e.g. foster-care, runaway, LBGTQ, homeless, and adopted children), with the goal of prevention and awareness.

The film, narrated by Academy Award-nominee Jessica Chastain (English) and Aislinn Derbez (Spanish), animated by Academy Award winners Gabriel Osorio Vargas and Pato Escala Pierart from Punkrobot, and written by 10 survivors of sex trafficking (aged 14–21) along with Alec Sokolow (Academy Award nominated writer of Toy Story) and Mary Mazzio, is a contemporary re-imagining of the classic fairy tale, Little Red Riding Hood. I AM LITTLE RED addresses the four tactics a "wolf" (trafficker/pimp) will use to lure Little Reds off their path.

=== A Most Beautiful Thing (2020) ===
Mazzio's 2020 film A Most Beautiful Thing chronicles the story of the first African American public high school rowing team in the US, made up of young men from the West Side of Chicago (many of whom were in rival gangs). Narrated by Academy Award-winner Common, and executive produced by NBA stars Grant Hill and Dwyane Wade, along with Grammy-winning producer 9th Wonder who also made the film's hip-hop score. A Most Beautiful Thing was set to premiere on March 16, 2020, at South by Southwest with a theatrical release slated for March 27, 2020 with AMC Theatres. Because of COVID-19 concerns, the film's release was postponed and released on Comcast NBCUniversal's Xfinity service on July 30, 2020, before moving to both their Peacock streaming service on September 4, 2020, and Amazon Prime on October 30, 2020.

The film holds a 100% rating on Rotten Tomatoes and was nominated in 2020 for Best Sports Documentary at the 5th Annual Critics Choice Documentary Awards. The film has held screenings hosted by the NAACP, members of Congress, professional sports teams, colleges and universities as well as key HBCU institutions, companies, and community groups.

On October 30, 2020 FILA released a limited edition FILAxAMBT Tennis 88 sneaker with proceeds benefitting the A Most Beautiful Thing Inclusion Fund which was established by the George Pocock Rowing Foundation to increase diversity, equity, and inclusion in the sport of rowing.
