= Children of the Night =

Children of the Night may refer to:

== Film and television ==
- Children of the Night (1921 film), a Fox Film release
- Children of the Night (1985 film), an American television film directed by Robert Markowitz
- Children of the Night (1991 film), an American horror film directed by Tony Randel
- Children of the Night, a 1999 documentary short produced by Arthur Cohn
- "Children of the Night" (Hemlock Grove), a television episode
- "Children of the Night", an episode of The Heights

== Literature ==
- Children of the Night (poetry collection), by Edwin Arlington Robinson, 1897
- "The Children of the Night" (short story), a 1931 short story by Robert E. Howard
- Children of the Night (Lackey novel), by Mercedes Lackey, 1990
- Children of the Night (Simmons novel), by Dan Simmons, 1992
- Children of the Night Award, given by the Dracula Society
- "The children of the night", a quotation by Count Dracula in the eponymous novel

== Music ==
- Children of the Night, a group that appeared on the British television programme Juke Box Jury in 1967

=== Albums ===
- Children of the Night (album), by Nash the Slash, or the title song, 1981
- The Children of the Night (album), by Tribulation, 2015
- Children of the Night, by 52nd Street, 1985
- Children of the Night, an EP by Dream Evil, 2003
- Children of the Night, an EP by Energy, 2011
- 13 Stairway - The Children of the Night, by Balzac, 1998

=== Songs ===
- "Children of the Night" (Richard Marx song), 1990
- "Children of the Night" (Wayne Shorter song), composed by Shorter and recorded by Art Blakey & the Jazz Messengers, 1961
- "Children of the Night", by the Blackout from The Best in Town, 2009
- "Children of the Night", by Blutengel from Seelenschmerz, 2001
- "Children of the Night", by Doro Pesch from The Ballads, 1998
- "Children of the Night", by Juno Reactor from Bible of Dreams, 1997
- "Children of the Night", by Manilla Road from Mystification, 1987
- "Children of the Night", by Nakatomi, 1996
- "Children of the Night", by Schoolyard Heroes from Abominations, 2007
- "Children of the Night", by the Stylistics from Round 2, 1973
- "Children of the Night", by Survivor from Eye of the Tiger, 1982
- "Children of the Night", by Whitesnake from Whitesnake, 1987
- "Children of the Night", by Vampires Everywhere! from Kiss the Sun Goodbye, 2011
- "The Children of the Night", by Bliss n Eso from Running on Air, 2010
- "The Children of the Night", by Lordi from The Monsterican Dream, 2004

== Other uses ==
- Children of the Night: Vampires, a 1996 accessory for the role-playing game Advanced Dungeons & Dragons
- Individuals with Xeroderma pigmentosum
- Children of the Night, a non-profit organization based in Los Angeles run by Lois Lee that provides support services to youths involved in prostitution and attempts to get them to leave sex work behind

== See also ==
- Children of Nyx, the Goddess of Night in Greek mythology
- Child of the Night (disambiguation)
- Children of the Light (disambiguation)
