= Children of the Light =

Children of the Light may refer to:

- Children of the Light (The Wheel of Time), characters in Robert Jordan's fantasy series The Wheel of Time
- Children of the Light (album), an album by The Jackson 5
- Children of the Light (film), a 2014 documentary film
- Sky: Children of the Light, a 2019 video game
- Religious Society of Friends, or Quakers, sometimes called Children of the Light
- Children of the Light, soundtrack from Harmagedon Genma Taisen anime movie

== See also ==
- Children of Light (disambiguation)
- Child of the Light, a 1991 novel by Janet Berliner and George Guthridge
- Child of Light, a 2014 video game published by Ubisoft
- Children of the Night (disambiguation)
