= Child of the Night =

Child of the Night may refer to:

- Child of the Night (1950 film), a Spanish drama film
- Child of the Night (novel), by Nancy Kilpatrick
- Enfantasme, a 1978 drama film also known as Child of the Night
- What the Peeper Saw, a 1972 horror film also known as Child of the Night

== See also ==
- Children of the Night (disambiguation)
- Child of the Light, a 1991 novel by Janet Berliner and George Guthridge
