= Children of Light (disambiguation) =

Children of Light is a book by Robert Stone. Children of Light may also refer to:

- The Children of Light, a novel by H. L. Lawrence that was the basis for The Damned (1963 film)
- Children of Light, a fictional terrorist group; see List of criminal organizations in DC Comics
- "Children of Light", a song by Yes from the albums Keystudio and Keys to Ascension 2
- Children of Light, a composition by Karen Tanaka

== See also ==
- Children of the Light (disambiguation)
- Child of Light, a video game
- Child of the Light, a 1991 novel by Janet Berliner and George Guthridge
- Daughters of Light, a 1999 book by Rebecca Larson
- War of the Sons of Light Against the Sons of Darkness, a military manual discovered among the Dead Sea Scrolls
