= I Am Jane Doe =

I am Jane Doe
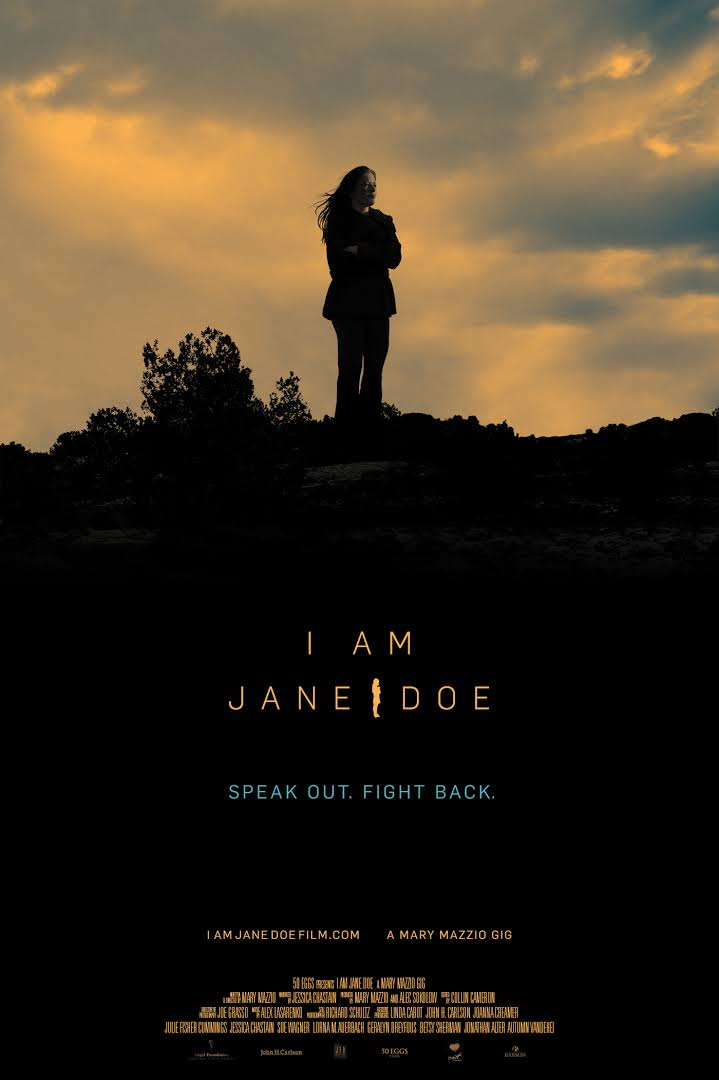
- Release Poster
- Directed by: Mary Mazzio
- Written by: Mary Mazzio
- Produced by: Mary Mazzio; Alec Sokolow
- Narrated by: Jessica Chastain
- Cinematography: Joe Grasso
- Edited by: Collin Cameron
- Music by: Alex Laserenko
- Production company: 50 Eggs Films
- Release dates: February 10, 2017 (United States); May 26, 2017 (Netflix)
- Running time: 99 minutes
- Country: United States
- Language: English

I am Jane Doe is a documentary directed by Mary Mazzio detailing the lawsuits several American mothers lodged against Backpage.com, the classified advertising website formerly owned by the Village Voice, which was charged with trafficking the women's teenage daughters for the purposes of prostitution.

The film is narrated by Jessica Chastain, and was produced by Mazzio and Alec Sokolow.

== Plot ==
I am Jane Doe mainly follows the stories of a group of middle school girls from Boston, a 15-year-old from Seattle, and a 13-year-old girl from St. Louis. The group of "Jane Does" lodged suits against Backpage.com, a now-defunct classified advertising website, accusing the website of facilitating sex trafficking due to its business and editorial practices, as well as the design of the website itself. The suits particularly concerned Section 230 of the Communications Decency Act.

I am Jane Doe also follows congressional actions against Backpage and online human trafficking. The film features interviews from Senators Rob Portman, John McCain, Claire McCaskill, and Heidi Heitkamp.

== Release ==
The film opened on February 10, 2017, in select theaters in New York City, Los Angeles, Washington, D.C., Seattle, Boston, and Philadelphia.

50% of the film's profits were donated to non-profit organizations which served children affected by human trafficking.

== Reception ==
I am Jane Doe received generally positive reviews by critics. On review aggregator website Rotten Tomatoes, the film holds an approval rating of 91%, based on 11 reviews, and an average rating of 7.6/10. On Metacritic, the film has a weighted average score of 69 out of 100, based on 6 critics, indicating "generally favourable reviews".

The film was also highlighted in The New Yorker, Film Journal International, Elle, Vogue, People, and on the NBC Nightly News.

However, there was some criticism directed towards the film, even by reviewers who regarded it positively. Katie Walsh of the Los Angeles Times described the I Am Jane Doe as "a powerful call to action to protect children over profit", but also wrote that the documentary was "an overwhelming, and sometimes disorganized firehose of information", and highlighted the fact that "Mazzio doesn’t include any advocates for Internet freedom, which feels like a missed opportunity to fully illustrate the tensions and reasons why the court cases have stalled."

Ann Hornaday of The Washington Post described the film as a "sobering, often sickening, bluntly effective piece of advocacy cinema", "a viscerally emotional case for a common-sense reassessment of the law", and "a gut-wrenching reminder that there are certain rocks we ignore at our peril." However, she did acknowledge that "some sex workers and nonprofits ... argue that Backpage was actually helpful in making their work safer, and in identifying exploitative perpetrators", views which "aren’t explored in “I Am Jane Doe,” which doesn’t apologize for voicing only one side of the debate".

Jeanette Catsoulis of the New York Times wrote that "[i]t’s all too easy to miss the fact that what we’re watching is more advocacy than argument. ... Attempting to simplify a dauntingly complex tangle of rights and responsibilities, the director, Mary Mazzio, has shaped her material into a classic heroes-and-villains showdown." Catsoulis also highlights "the movie’s lack of clear definitions for terms like sex trafficking and child sex (which mean different things in different states). How it fails to consider the criminalization of sex work as a possible barrier to rooting out those who exploit minors. Or how the plaintiffs’ demand for age verification of the women in online ads could be almost impossible to put in effect."

Furthermore, "despite an abundance of legal expertise, no one is on hand to substantively address First Amendment rights, or to examine claims that the website is a useful ally in locating and prosecuting traffickers", and Catsoulis argues that "[w]ithout these balancing voices, “I Am Jane Doe” coalesces into a steamroller of pain that squashes our ability to see beyond its wounded families."

== See also ==
- Human trafficking in the United States
