= Ten9Eight: Shoot for the Moon =

- Directed by: Mary Mazzio
- Written by: Mary Mazzio
- Produced by: Mary Mazzio
- Starring: Tatyana Blackwell, Jessica Cervantes, Gabriel Echoles, Shan Shan Huang, Amanda Loyola, William Mack, Anné Montague, Alexander Niles, Rodney Walker, Ja'Mal Willis
- Cinematography: Richard Klug
- Edited by: Paul Gattuso
- Music by: Alex Lasarenko
- Production company: 50 Eggs Films
- Release date: November 13, 2009
- Running time: 84 minutes
- Country: United States
- Language: English

Ten9Eight: Shoot for the Moon is a 2009 documentary film about inner city teenagers who compete in an annual business plan competition run by the Network for Teaching Entrepreneurship (NFTE) written, directed, and produced by Mary Mazzio.

== Synopsis ==
Mary Mazzio's Ten9Eight: Shoot for the Moon, is about teenagers competing in a nationwide business contest. It follows the stories of several inner city teens (of differing race, religion, and ethnicity) as they compete in the annual business plan competition run by the Network for Teaching Entrepreneurship (NFTE). The teens come from all over the country and are among the 24,000 students that compete in the event each year, with the winner taking home a $10,000 grand prize.

It played in movie theaters owned by its sponsor, AMC Entertainment, in seven US cities.

== Critical reception ==
Critical reception was unenthusiastic. On the review aggregator website Rotten Tomatoes, 46% of 13 critics' reviews are positive, with an average rating of 5.5/10. Metacritic, which uses a weighted average, assigned the film a score of 49 out of 100, based on eight critics, indicating "mixed or average" reviews.
