= Janet Berliner =

American novelist

- Born: Janet Gluckman; September 24, 1939; Cape Town, South Africa
- Died: October 24, 2012 (aged 73)
- Occupation: Writer
- Writing career
- Notable awards: Bram Stoker Award

Janet Berliner (née Gluckman; September 24, 1939 – October 24, 2012), was a Bram Stoker Award-winning author and served as president of the Horror Writers Association from 1997 to 1998. She was also a member of Authors Guild, the International Thriller Writers, and the Science Fiction and Fantasy Writers of America. She was born in Cape Town, South Africa, but moved to America with her husband in 1960. She became a citizen of the United States in 1966, and lived in Las Vegas.

== Bibliography ==
=== Series ===
- Madagascar Manifesto
  - Child of the Light (1991)
  - Child of the Journey (1996)
  - Children of the Dusk (1997) – Bram Stoker Award winner
- The Madagascar Manifesto (omnibus) (2002) (with George Guthridge)

=== Novels ===
- Rite of the Dragon (1981) (writing as Janet Gluckman)
- Artifact (2003) (with Kevin J. Anderson, Matthew J. Costello and F. Paul Wilson)

=== Short stories ===
- A Case for Justice (1998) (collected in Harry Turtledove's anthology Alternate Generals)

=== Essays ===
- Mi Yagid Labanim (1996) (Published in Johnathan Blacke and Robert Hatch's roleplaying supplement Charnel Houses of Europe: The Shoah)
