= A Most Beautiful Thing =

- Directed by: Mary Mazzio
- Written by: Mary Mazzio
- Produced by: Common; Grant Hill; Dwyane Wade; 9th Wonder; Bill Hudson; Cameron Winklevoss; Tyler Winklevoss; Mary Mazzio
- Narrated by: Common
- Cinematography: Joe Grasso
- Edited by: Andrew Eldridge; Tom Cole; Mary Mazzio
- Music by: 9th Wonder; Alex Laserenko
- Production company: 50 Eggs Films
- Release date: July 15, 2020 (Atlanta virtual premiere)
- Running time: 95 minutes
- Country: United States
- Language: English

A Most Beautiful Thing is a 2020 documentary film chronicling the history of the first US African American public high school rowing team, composed of young men from the West Side of Chicago, many of whom were in rival gangs. The film is narrated by Common, directed by filmmaker and Olympic rower Mary Mazzio, and produced by NBA athletes Grant Hill and Dwyane Wade along with 9th Wonder who also did the hip-hop score for the film.

Fifty percent of the film's profits will be donated to support inclusion efforts within the sport of rowing as well as trauma research and social justice initiatives with the NAACP.

== Synopsis ==
A Most Beautiful Thing follows the story of the first African American public high school rowing team in the United States. Formed in the 1990s at Manley High School and based in Chicago's West Side, the team was made up of young men, many of whom were members of rival gangs.

Reuniting after 20 years, the team gets back on the water to prepare to race in the 2019 Chicago Sprints, the largest rowing regatta in the Midwest. In the process, Arshay Cooper, the team's captain, takes inspiration from the past and reaches out to the Chicago Police Department to show that rowing can bring even people with the most disparate of backgrounds together.

A Most Beautiful Thing features interviews with former US Secretary of Education Arne Duncan, Olympic coach Mike Teti, Olympic rower David Banks, and Olympic International Committee Member Anita DeFrantz.

== Production and release ==
A Most Beautiful Thing was inspired by team captain Arshay Cooper's 2015 memoir Suga Water, which was republished June 30, 2020 by Flatiron Books under the name A Most Beautiful Thing.

The film was executive produced by NBA athletes Grant Hill and Dwyane Wade along with 9th Wonder. Bill Hudson, John H. Carlson, Bill McNabb and Katie McNabb, Ginny Gilder and Lynn Slaughter, Bryan White and Christine White, Bruce Herring and Tricia Herring, Cameron Winklevoss and Tyler Winklevoss, Ted Dintersmith, Derek Dudley, Doris Casap, Ashley Bekton, Chaz Ebert, and Rick Lane are also listed as executive producers.

Originally selected as a Documentary Spotlight, A Most Beautiful Thing was set to premiere at South by Southwest on March 16, 2020 and premiere nationally with AMC Theatres on March 27, 2020. Due to the COVID-19 pandemic, the film's release was pushed back to July 31, 2020 when it opened on Xfinity. On July 30, 2020 the film became available on Comcast NBCUniversal's Xfinity before moving to its Peacock streaming service on September 4, 2020. The film was additionally made available on Amazon Prime on October 30, 2020.

== Reception ==
A Most Beautiful Thing received positive reviews by critics. On the review aggregator website Rotten Tomatoes, 100% of 17 critics' reviews are positive, with an average rating of 8.2/10. Hollywood Reporter critic Frank Scheck wrote:

The timing couldn't be more fortuitous for the release of Mary Mazzio's uplifting documentary about the nation's first African American high school rowing team, which feels almost like a tonic for these troubled times... [it] powerfully demonstrates the healing potential of sports and the ways it can help bridge societal divides... A movie we could really use right now

Additional reviews called the film "absolutely a must watch" by Deadspin; "amazing" by the Chicago Sun-Times; "one of the best documentaries to unveil at South by Southwest" by the team at Roger Ebert; and "one of the best films this decade" by ChicagoNow.

A Most Beautiful Thing has been met with critical success and was nominated in 2020 for Best Sports Documentary at the 5th Annual Critics' Choice Documentary Awards. The film has had events and screenings hosted by members of Congress, the NAACP, professional sports teams, colleges and universities as well as key HBCU institutions, companies, and community groups.

On October 30, 2020 FILA released a limited edition FILAxAMBT Tennis 88 sneaker with proceeds benefitting the A Most Beautiful Thing Inclusion Fund which was established by the George Pocock Rowing Foundation to increase diversity, equity, and inclusion in the sport of rowing. The film also partnered with Pepsi and the Miami Dolphins to host A MOST BEAUTIFUL THING WEEKEND included a film screening and conversation with executive producer Grant Hill, Director Mary Mazzio, and author Arshay, as well as a performance by Reuben Vincent and Khrysis (who both appear on the A MOST BEAUTIFUL THING soundtrack), and a 1000 meal give-away for families experiencing food insecurity.
