= Backpage =

Defunct classified advertising website

Back Page
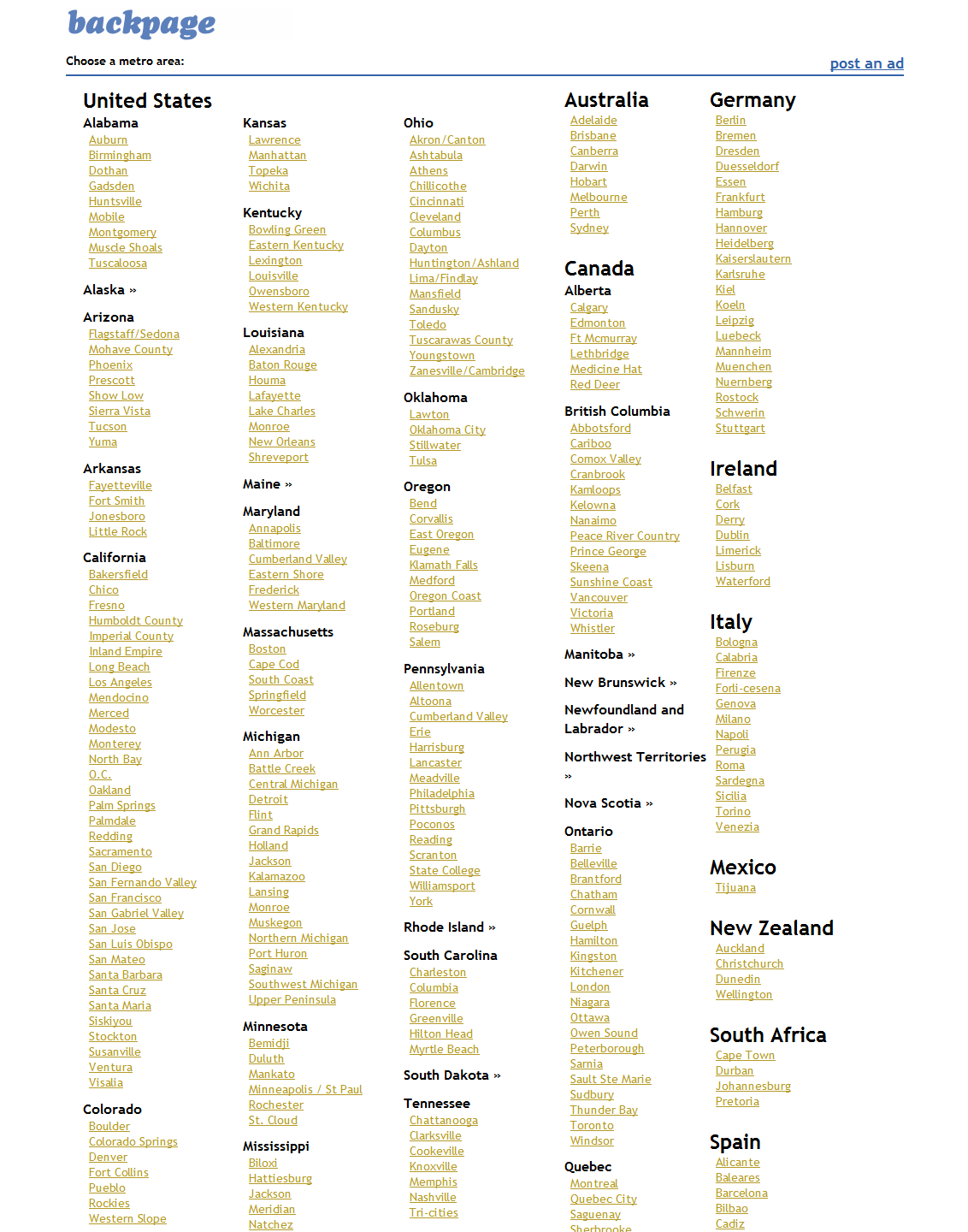
- Company type: Web communications
- Available in: English, Spanish, German, French, Portuguese, Japanese, Korean, Norwegian, Russian, Chinese, Finnish, Italian, Dutch, Swedish, and Turkish
- Dissolved: April 6, 2018
- Owners: Atlantische Bedrijven CV; Former owner: Village Voice Media
- Launched: 2004
- Current status: Shut down by the United States FBI; domain now defunct

Backpage was a classified advertising website founded in 2004 by the alternative newspaper chain New Times Inc./New Times Media (later known as Village Voice Media or VVM) as a rival to Craigslist.

Similar to Craigslist, Backpage let users post ads to categories such as personals, automotive, rentals, jobs and adult services. It soon became the second largest online classified site in the United States.

Craigslist closed its "Adult Services" section in 2010 in response to pressure from state attorneys general and other critics claiming the section facilitated prostitution. Much of Craigslist's share of the adult ad market migrated to other sites, with Backpage being the main beneficiary.

Craigslist's former critics focused on Backpage, which resisted moves to censor the site until January 2017, when Backpage closed their adult section prior to a Congressional hearing.

== History ==
=== New Times and founding of Backpage ===
Backpage founder Michael Lacey founded the Phoenix New Times in 1970, saying it was a response to the Vietnam War and the Kent State shootings. Backpage co-founder Jim Larkin joined the New Times in 1971. The New Times' papers were free and relied on advertising. The New Times especially relied on classified advertising to earn money.

Due to the rise of Craigslist, a classified-ads website that competed with newspapers for advertising revenue, Lacey and Larkin in 2004 founded Backpage.com, which Wired magazine described as "a bare-bones interface wrapped in Facebooky blue, similar to Craigslist in form and function." The site's name was a nod to the classified ads in the back section of every New Times paper, "culminating in a premium-priced ad showcase on the paper's back page." The idea for Backpage.com came from New Times salesman Carl Ferrer; Larkin put him in charge of the new venture.

Backpage helped sustain first New Times', then Village Voice Media's papers, and expanded to become the second-largest online classifieds site next to Craigslist. Lacey and Larkin sold Village Voice Media to company executives in 2012. The pair sold Backpage to Ferrer in 2015.

Craigslist and Backpage had listings for a variety of goods and services, such as real estate, yard sales, personals, work wanted and jobs offered. Backpage's adult-themed advertising section gained the most attention.

After Craigslist took down its adult advertising section in 2010, Backpage continued to maintain adult advertising on its site. As Backpage's popularity grew, the site's adult advertising section began to attract lawsuits and investigations regarding allegations of prostitution and sex trafficking.

=== Adult advertising ===
After Craigslist ended its adult advertising section after pressure from law enforcement and anti-sex trafficking advocates, some adult listings almost immediately migrated to the Backpage's "personals" section. They scattered to other sites as well, but Backpage, already number two in the classified ads market, received most of the post-Craigslist-era adult-content migrated listings. Many of the same controversies regarding content moderation and adult advertising that plagued Craigslist would now target Backpage.

In an internal email after Craigslist's takedown of its adult category, CEO Ferrer said it was "an opportunity for us. Also a time when we need to make sure our content is not illegal".

In September 2010, a Missouri girl sued Village Voice Media, claiming that she had been trafficked at age 14 via ads placed on the site, and that Backpage had been negligent. A federal judge dismissed the lawsuit, based on Section 230 of the Communications Decency Act.

A month after the suit was filed, Backpage hired former federal prosecutor and National Center for Missing & Exploited Children board member Hemanshu Nigam to come up with a strategic plan to combat the misuse of the site for trafficking. Nigam and Backpage consulted with anti-trafficking organizations about measures to take, such as preventing the use of suggestive terms such as "Lolita", "incest" and "new in town". According to Wired, Backpage had implemented most of these new protocols by January 2011.

In October 2011, in a full-page ad in The New York Times, 36 clergymen demanded that VVM and Backpage remove the latter's adult classifieds section, citing reports of adult ads connected to underage prostitution, stating, "Even if one minor is sold for sex, it is one too many." In a response to the ad, VVM asserted that it had "extensive working relationships with law enforcement from FBI to the local police", and claiming it had "spent millions of dollars and dedicated countless resources to protecting children from those who would misuse an adult site".

According to both Reason and Wired, law enforcement and Backpage frequently cooperated, with Backpage receiving praise from various police agencies for its help in finding trafficked persons and convicting their exploiters. In May 2011, the FBI awarded a certificate of recognition to Ferrer, then VP of Backpage, "for your outstanding cooperation and assistance in connection with an investigation of great importance."

In November 2011, the Coalition Against Trafficking in Women organized a demonstration outside of The Village Voice's offices in New York City, with some people chanting slogans and waving signs in protest against "Backpage.com's facilitation of sex trafficking".

=== Backpage and Village Voice split ===
Increasingly, Backpage critics and law enforcement accused Backpage of being a hub for sex trafficking of both adults and minors despite claims by the website that it sought to block ads suspected of child sex trafficking or prostitution and reported hundreds per month to the NCMEC, which in turn notified law enforcement.

Backpage supporters claimed that by providing prompt and detailed information about suspicious postings to law enforcement, including phone numbers, credit card numbers and IP addresses, the website helped protect minors from trafficking. They contended that shutting down Backpage would drive traffickers to other places on the internet that would be less forthcoming about crucial information for law enforcement.

Numerous writers, non-governmental organizations (NGOs) legal experts and law enforcement officials including the Electronic Frontier Foundation, the Internet Archive, and the Cato Institute, argued that freedom of speech and potentially the internet itself would be threatened if adult-themed ads were prohibited on Backpage. These groups cited both the First Amendment and Section 230 of the Communications Decency Act, which holds that service providers were not liable for content produced by third parties.

In 2012, at the behest of a number of NGOs, including FAIR Girls and the NCMEC, Fitzgibbon Media (at the time, a well-known progressive/liberal public relations agency) created a multimedia campaign to garner support for the anti-Backpage position. They enlisted support from musicians, politicians, journalists, media companies and retailers.

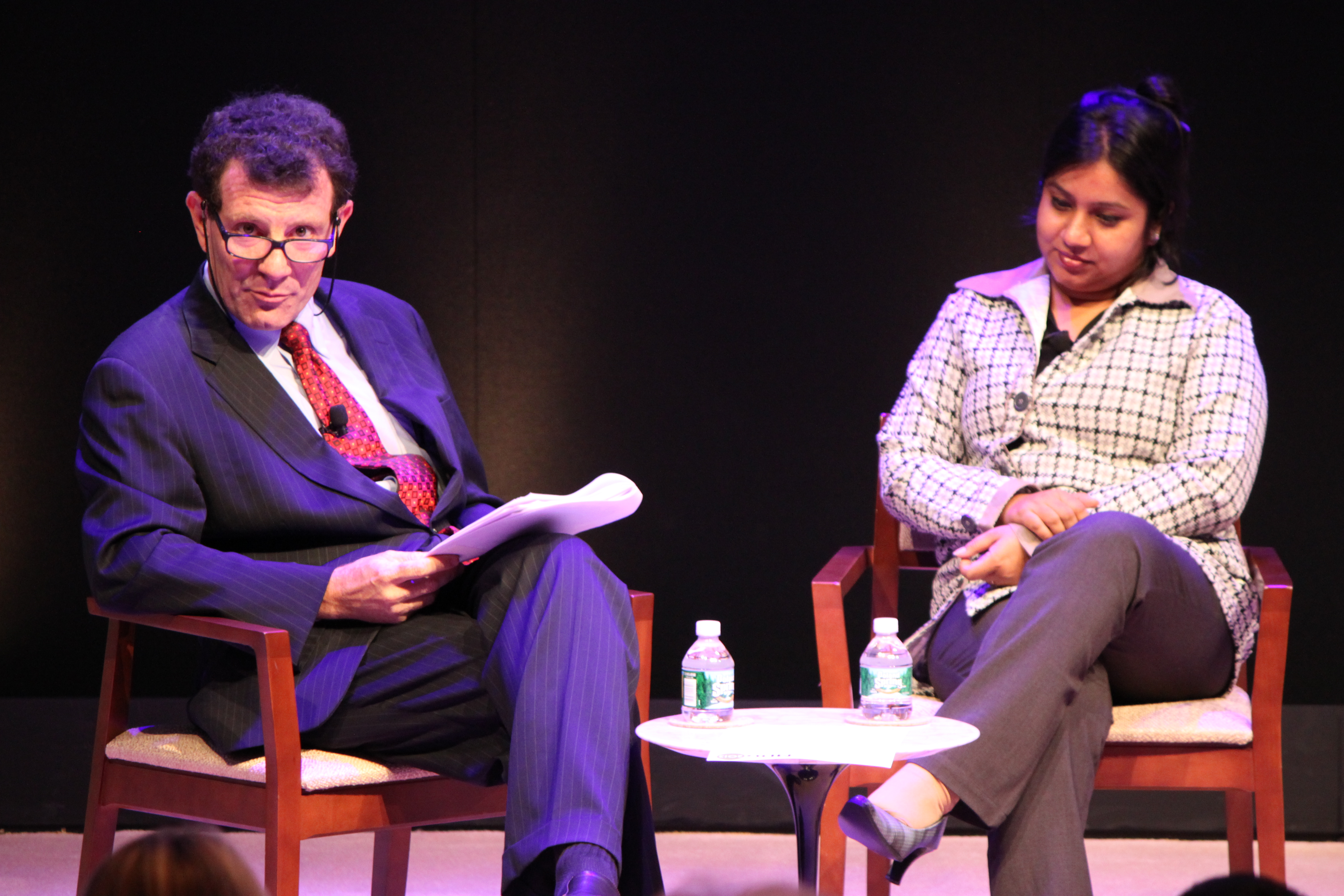
New York Times columnist Nicholas Kristof (left) wrote several pieces denouncing Village Voice Media; VVM responded by criticizing Kristof's journalism.

The Fitzgibbon campaign created a greater public dialogue, both pro and con, regarding Backpage. Some companies, including H&M, IKEA, and Barnes & Noble, canceled ads for publications owned by Village Voice Media. Over 230,000 people including 600 religious leaders, 51 attorneys general, 19 U.S. senators, over 50 non-governmental associations, musician Alicia Keys, and members of R.E.M., The Roots, and Alabama Shakes petitioned the website to remove sexual content.

New York Times columnist Nicholas Kristof authored a number of columns criticizing Backpage, to which Backpage publicly responded. In a March 17, 2012, column, "Where Pimps Peddle Their Goods", Kristof told the story of a young woman whose "street name" was Alissa. Kristof wrote that pimps had coerced Alissa into a life of prostitution and posted ads for her on Backpage while she was underage. He also urged mainstream advertisers to boycott Village Voice Media and linked to a Change.org petition asking VVM to stop allowing its users to post adult ads on Backpage.

In response to the article, the Village Voice criticized Kristof's reporting, noting that Backpage had not existed in the cities where Alissa had been prostituted at the time she was underage. The unsigned Voice article also contended that Backpage dedicated "hundreds of staff to screen adult classifieds in order to keep juveniles off the site and to work proactively with law enforcement in their efforts to locate victims".

In 2012, Village Voice Media separated its newspaper company, which then consisted of 13 weekly alternative newspapers and their affiliated web properties from Backpage, leaving Backpage in the control of shareholders Mike Lacey and Jim Larkin.

In interviews with Phoenix media, Lacey explained that the controversies over Backpage had become "a distraction" for the editors of VVM's papers and that Backpage had come to monopolize his and Larkin's time.

Executives for the spinoff holding company, called Voice Media Group (VMG) and based in Denver, raised "some money from private investors" in order to purchase the newspapers; the executives who formed the new company were lower-ranked than Lacey and Larkin. In December 2014, Village Voice Media sold Backpage to a Dutch holding company. Carl Ferrer, the founder of Backpage, remained as CEO of the company. Michael Hardy of the Texas Observer stated that since Lacey and Larkin remained at Backpage, "it would be more accurate to say that Backpage spun off Village Voice Media."

=== Legal decisions ===
Beginning in 2011 a number of legal challenges were brought in attempts to eliminate the adult section of Backpage or shut down the website entirely. Backpage successfully argued that the First Amendment protections of free speech would be compromised by any restriction on postings by individuals on the Backpage website.

Section 230 of the Communications Decency Act of 1996 (CDA) served as an additional cornerstone in the defense. Section 230 says that "No provider or user of an interactive computer service shall be treated as the publisher or speaker of any information provided by another information content provider." This portion of the CDA was drafted to protect ISPs and other interactive service providers on the Internet, as well as their users, from liability for content originating from third parties. The enactment of this portion of the CDA overturned the decision in Stratton Oakmont, Inc. v. Prodigy Services Co. in which Prodigy was deemed by the court to be a publisher because they had exercised "editorial control" by engaging in content moderation, and were therefore liable for any content posted on its site. Many observers have credited the passage of section 230 of the CDA as the spark that ignited the explosive growth of the internet. The protection afforded to website owners under section 230 was upheld in numerous court cases subsequent to the passage of the legislation in 1996 including Doe v. MySpace Inc., 528 F.3d 413 (5th Cir. 2008) and Dart v. Craigslist, Inc., 665 F. Supp. 2d 961 (N.D. Ill. October 20, 2009).

Some of the most important civil cases involving Backpage are described below:

==== M.A., et al. vs. Village Voice Media Holdings, LLC ====
Plaintiff M.A., a 14-year-old runaway, claimed to be a victim of sex trafficking by Latasha Jewell McFarland, who later pleaded guilty to taking nude photos of M.A. and posting them to Backpage in ads offering M.A. for commercial sex. M.A. sued Backpage, arguing Backpage was liable because Backpage had created an "adult" category on the site and was aware that other minors had been trafficked through ads in that category. In 2011, the court ruled that CDA Section 230 still applied and "even if Backpage knows that third parties are posting illegal content, 'the service providers' failure to intervene is immunized'".

==== Backpage.com, LLC vs. McKenna ====
In 2012, Washington state passed SB 6251, which made it a felony to either directly or indirectly publish or cause to be published "any advertisement for a commercial sex act ... that includes the depiction of a minor". Ignorance of the age of the minor depicted in the ad was no defense. Backpage, joined by the Internet Archive, sued in federal court to stop the law from going into effect. The court barred enforcement, finding the statute precluded by federal law, specifically, CDA Section 230. It also ruled that SB 6251 likely violated the First Amendment, as the state could not assume that all ads in an "adult" section were for prostitution without trampling free speech rights.

==== Backpage.com v. Cooper ====
In Backpage.com v. Cooper, a federal judge enjoined a Tennessee law passed in 2012, SB 2371, which was a broader version of the Washington state statute. SB 2371 made it a felony to "sell or offer to sell" an ad that "would appear to a reasonable person" to be for a commercial sex act with a minor. As in McKenna, the court found that the law was both precluded by CDA 230 and likely in violation of the First Amendment and the Commerce Clause of the U.S. Constitution. The court also ruled that the law's definition of "commercial sex act" was so broad as to potentially include legal adult services, such as phone sex. "[W]hen freedom of speech hangs in the balance – the state may not use a butcher knife on a problem that requires a scalpel to fix", the court noted.

==== Backpage v. Hoffman ====
Backpage v. Hoffman in August 2013 was the third strike against state laws attempting to legislate Backpage out of existence. In this case, New Jersey enacted a statute, referred to by the court as 12(b)1, which largely echoed the language of the Washington state and Tennessee laws. Again, a federal judge enjoined the law, finding it preempted by CDA Section 230, and in violation of the First Amendment and the Commerce Clause. The act is "hopelessly vague and overbroad" and "impermissibly chills protected speech", the judge wrote, ridiculing New Jersey's Attorney General for ignoring the statute's plain language in his defense of it. The Internet Archive also joined in this suit.

==== Backpage v. Dart ====
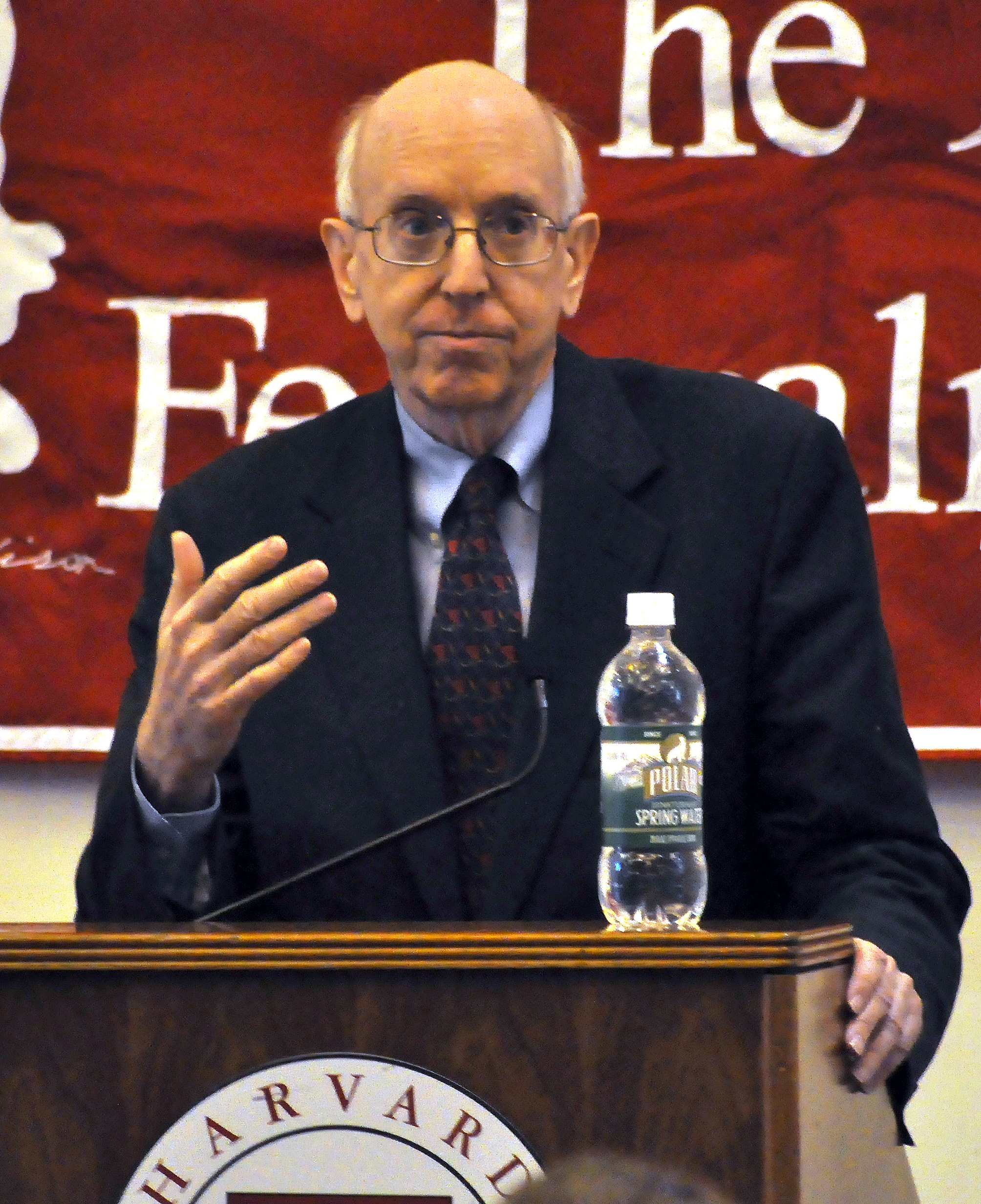
Federal Judge Richard Posner at Harvard University

Following his loss in Dart v. Craigslist, Cook County, Illinois Sheriff Tom Dart turned his attention to Backpage, and more specifically, two of Backpage's payment processors, MasterCard and Visa. In June 2015, Dart wrote a letter to both companies, requesting that they "cease and desist" allowing their cards to purchase any ads on Backpage, even non-adult ones, suggesting that they could be in violation of federal law due to human trafficking via ads on the site. Both MasterCard and Visa complied. Backpage then sued Dart in federal court, arguing he had used the power of his office to violate Backpage's First Amendment rights. The district court ruled in Dart's favor, but in November 2015, a three-judge panel of the Seventh Circuit Court of Appeals reversed the district court in an opinion written by Judge Richard Posner.

Posner noted that Dart would only be in the right if there had been "no constitutional protected speech in the ads on Backpage's website". As a result, Posner found Dart's letter to be a First Amendment violation. Posner pointed out that Dart's claim that "everything in the adult section of Backpage's website is criminal, violent, or exploitive" was inaccurate.

Posner wrote:

Fetishism? Phone sex? Performances by striptease artists? (Vulgar is not violent.) One ad in the category 'dom & fetish' is for the services of a 'professional dominatrix'—a woman who is paid to whip or otherwise humiliate a customer in order to arouse him sexually ... It's not obvious that such conduct endangers women or children or violates any laws, including laws against prostitution.

Posner ordered the lower court to enjoin Dart from taking any actions against payment processors for Backpage. Backpage's legal victory did not reverse MasterCard and Visa's earlier decision to disallow the use of their payment cards on Backpage.

==== Jane Doe, et al. v. Backpage.com ====
Three anonymous Jane Does who were allegedly sex trafficked as minors sued Backpage in 2014 in federal court, arguing that their traffickers used Backpage to post ads selling them for sex. They claimed to have been raped numerous times while underage and accuse Backpage of facilitating sex trafficking due to its business and editorial practices, as well as the design of the website itself. The district court ruled against the plaintiffs, who then appealed to the First Circuit Court of Appeals. In an opinion written by Judge Bruce M. Seyla, the appeals court ruled that the actions by Backpage were "traditional publisher functions" regarding third-party content, and therefore were shielded by CDA Section 230. Stearns conceded that the Does' suffering evoked "outrage", but that the "remedy is through legislation not litigation". The appellants sought certiorari by the U.S. Supreme Court and were denied. The case became the basis for the 2017 documentary I Am Jane Doe.

In June 2017, the three Jane Does re-filed their complaint in federal court using information taken from the U.S. Senate's investigation into Backpage, which concluded Backpage had facilitated sex trafficking. The complaint alleged that Backpage substantially changed the ads connected to the three Jane Does, thereby losing its Section 230 protection. The court agreed that in the case of one ad involving Jane Doe 3, an edit occurred suggesting that she was an adult. Backpage's counsel argued that the ad's poster actually made the change, but the court said this was a fact to be determined at trial and allowed Jane Doe 3's case to continue. In the case of Jane Does 1 and 2, the court said there was no evidence that Backpage substantially contributed to the ads, so Backpage would have Section 230 immunity against those claims. In August 2018, the court stayed proceedings in the case pending the conclusion of the criminal case in Arizona.

==== Backpage.com v. Lynch ====
In 2015, Congress passed the Stop Advertising Victims of Exploitation Act (SAVE ACT), a vaguely worded law that forbade advertising that involved underage or coerced prostitution, i.e., sex trafficking. The law supposedly took aim at adult ads on Backpage, but civil liberties groups argued that the law was too broad and would have a chilling effect on speech. Backpage sued then-U.S. Attorney General Loretta Lynch to preclude the law's enforcement, arguing that despite its best efforts to keep illegal ads off its site, the wording of the law raised the bar for prosecution from a "knowing" standard to one of "reckless disregard", and therefore violated the First Amendment.

In October 2016, the U.S. District Court for the District of Columbia found that the law did not criminalize protected speech, and that because Backpage took steps to avoid having illegal content on its site, it arguably was not in imminent danger of prosecution. But Backpage's suit won a significant clarification from the court, which interpreted the law as requiring a "knowing" mens rea standard for a conviction, which is a higher standard than "reckless disregard". Wrote the court: "while it might be true that some Congressional members had Backpage.com in mind when enacting the SAVE ACT, the statute is 'aimed' at individuals who knowingly advertise or benefit from advertising sex trafficking."

=== California prosecution ===
On October 6, 2016, Texas Attorney General Ken Paxton and California Attorney General Kamala Harris announced that Texas authorities had raided the Dallas headquarters of Backpage.com and arrested CEO Carl Ferrer at the George Bush Intercontinental Airport in Houston on felony charges of pimping, pimping a minor, and conspiracy to commit pimping. In a press release, Harris denounced Backpage as "the world's largest online brothel". The California arrest warrant alleged that 99% of Backpage's revenue was directly attributable to prostitution-related ads and that many of the ads involved victims of sex trafficking, including children under the age of 18. The State of Texas was also considering a money laundering charge pending its investigation. Arrest warrants were issued against former Backpage owners and founders Michael Lacey and James Larkin. Lacey and Larkin were charged with conspiracy to commit pimping.

Backpage general counsel Liz McDougall dismissed the raid as an "election year stunt", which she said was not "a good-faith action by law enforcement". McDougall said that the company would "take all steps necessary to end this frivolous prosecution and will pursue its full remedies under federal law against the state actors who chose to ignore the law, as it has done successfully in other cases." Backpage accused California attorney general Kamala Harris, who was running for the U.S. Senate at the time, of an illegal prosecution.

Harris's office fought against releasing the men on bail, and the three prisoners appeared together in court, confined to a cage inside a Sacramento courtroom, wearing orange jumpsuits. They were released on October 13, 2016, with bail set at $500,000 for Ferrer, and $250,000 each for Lacey and Larkin. All three pleaded not guilty.

Writing for the magazine Pacific Standard, reporter Melissa Gira Grant observed that news outlets repeatedly referred to the three men as being charged with "sex trafficking", though the charges were actually related to prostitution.

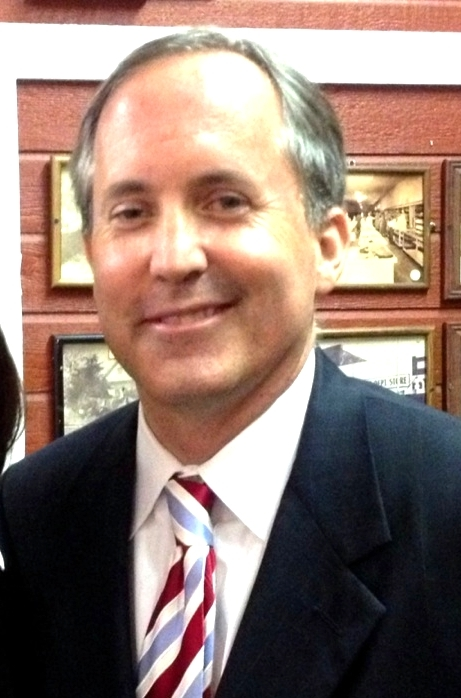
Texas Attorney General Ken Paxton partnered with Harris on the 2016 Backpage busts.

"None are accused with forcing anyone into prostitution", Grant wrote. "None are even accused of having had any physical contact with anyone in the sex trade. What the complaint claims the men did was earn money from a website where users could place advertisements for what Backpage categorized as 'adult' services."

On October 17, 2016, attorneys for Ferrer, Larkin and Lacey sent a letter to Harris asking that all charges against their clients be dropped. Harris refused. The letter accused Harris of acting in bad faith, since she had signed a letter to Congress in 2013, along with 48 other state attorneys general, telling Congress that Section 230 of the CDA "prevents State and local law enforcement agencies from prosecuting" companies such as Backpage, and asking that Congress change the law.

On November 17, 2016, Superior Court Judge Michael Bowman issued a tentative ruling on a motion to dismiss the charges, indicating that he would likely do so. He ruled that the many of Backpage's decisions regarding third-party content were "all traditional publishing decisions", which are "generally immunized under" Section 230. Bowman wrote, "In short, any victimization resulted from the third party's placement of the ad, not because Backpage [profited] from the ad placement."

On December 9, 2016, Bowman issued his final ruling, dismissing all the charges in the complaint, stating that "Congress has precluded liability for online publishers for the action of publishing third party speech and thus provided for both a foreclosure from prosecution and an affirmative defense at trial. Congress has spoken on this matter and it is for Congress, not this Court, to revisit."

On December 23, 2016, the state of California filed new charges against Backpage CEO Carl Ferrer and former Backpage owners Mike Lacey and Jim Larkin accusing them of pimping and money laundering. Lawyers for Backpage responded that the new charges rehashed the earlier case, which had been dismissed. The filing of new charges came just a few weeks before Kamala Harris was to be sworn in as U.S. Senator from California.

Superior Court Judge Lawrence Brown dismissed the new pimping charges on August 23, 2017, writing that the state's "attempt to assign criminal liability to defendants who offered an online forum on which other people posted advertisements that led to prostitution ... confuse moral obligations with legal ones and have been rejected in other jurisdictions".

Brown allowed most of the money-laundering counts to stand. The state alleges that Backpage illegally set up separate accounts to accept payments for ads from credit card companies that refused to do business with them after Sheriff Dart threatened them. Brown warned that prosecutors would be obliged to "show that the profits came solely from that underlying criminal activity."

As part of his plea deal with the federal government, Ferrer pleaded guilty to one conspiracy count and three counts of money laundering in California state court, as well as to charges in Texas and in federal court. The California case against Lacey and Larkin for money laundering remains on hold pending the outcome of the federal trial. Ferrer has promised to testify against Lacey and Larkin in return for leniency.

=== U.S. Senate investigation ===
Since April 2015, the U.S. Senate Permanent Subcommittee on Investigations ("PSI") had been investigating Backpage.com as part of an overall investigation of human trafficking. After a voluntary, day-long briefing and interview provided by the company's General Counsel, PSI followed up with a subpoena to Backpage.com demanding over 40 categories of documents, covering 120 subjects, regarding Backpage's business practices. Much of the subpoena targeted Backpage's editorial functions as an online intermediary.

Over the ensuing months, Backpage raised objections to the subpoena which PSI rejected, including that the subpoena was impermissibly burdensome both in the volume of documents PSI demanded and in its intrusion into constitutionally protected editorial discretion. PSI subsequently issued a shorter document subpoena with only eight requests but broader in scope and also targeting Backpage.com's editorial functions. Backpage.com continued to object on First Amendment and other grounds.

PSI applied in March 2016 for a federal court order to enforce three of the eight categories of documents in the subpoena. In August 2016, the U.S. District Court in D.C. granted PSI's application and ordered Backpage to produce documents responsive to the three requests.

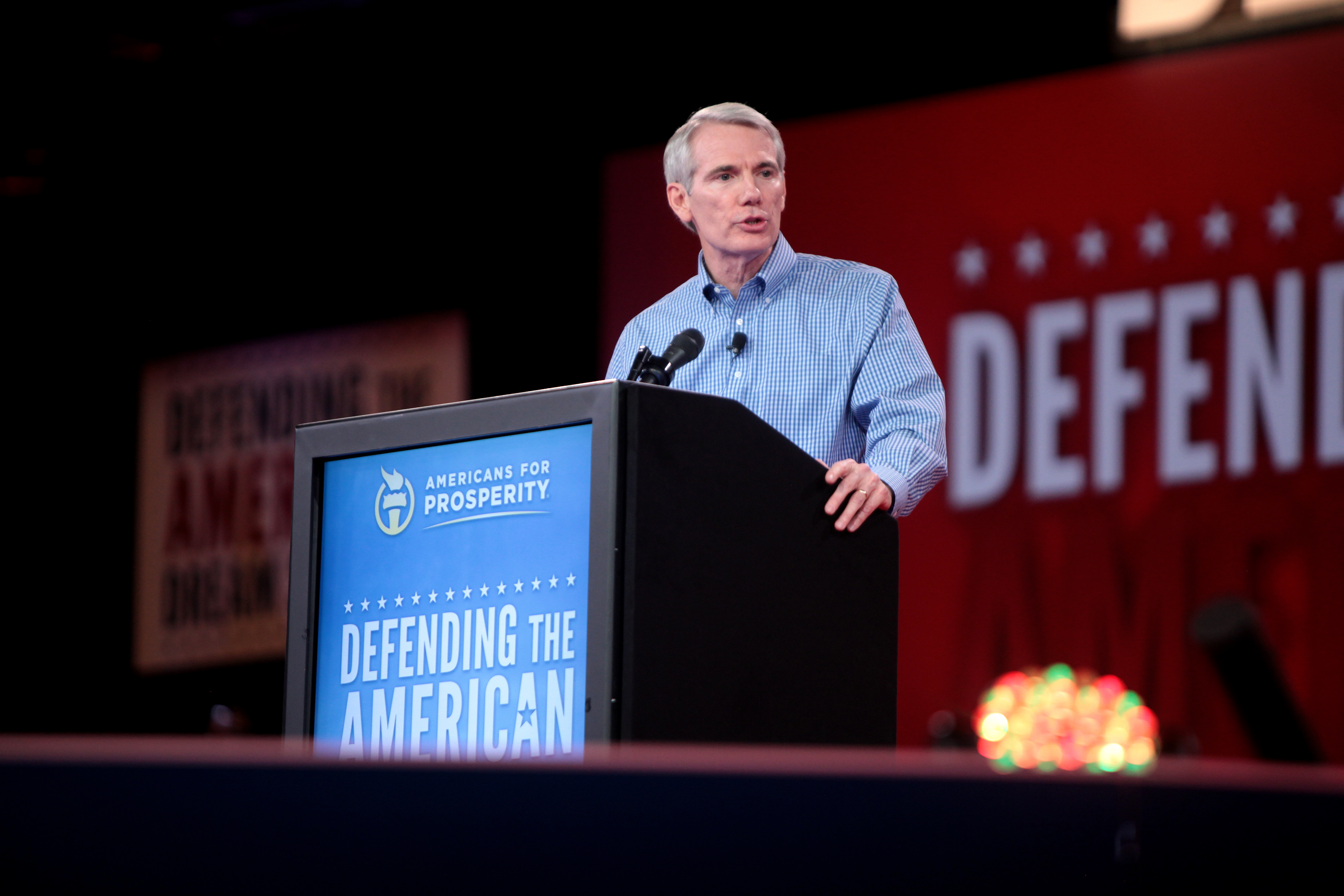
U.S. Senator Rob Portman of Ohio chaired the Permanent Subcommittee on Investigations (PSI) during the January 10, 2017, Backpage hearing

Backpage immediately filed an appeal and sought a stay, which the district court denied, then filed emergency stay petitions with the U.S. Court of Appeals for the D.C. Circuit, and the U.S. Supreme Court. Each appellate court issued temporary stays to consider whether to grant a stay pending appeal, but eventually denied the emergency stay requests. The D.C. Circuit agreed to expedite the appeal, and one of its judges who considered the emergency stay said he would have granted it. Backpage has continued to pursue its appeal, producing thousands of documents to PSI pursuant to the District Court order. PSI scheduled a Subcommittee hearing regarding Backpage.com for January 10, 2017.

On January 9, 2017, prior to its scheduled hearings on Backpage the next day, the PSI released a report, denouncing what it referred to as Backpage's "knowing facilitation of online sex trafficking".

That same day, Backpage removed its adult category from all of its sites in the United States. In its place, the site posted a banner that read, "CENSORED", stating that "the government has unconstitutionally censored this content". Backpage said it took the action due to the government's harassment and extra-legal tactics, which made it too costly for Backpage to continue hosting adult ads.

Subcommittee chair Sen. Rob Portman, a Republican, and ranking Democrat Sen. Claire McCaskill, issued statement denying that Backpage's move was in response to censorship, saying the site's shutdown of its adult ad section was a "validation of our findings".

The Electronic Frontier Foundation weighed in, stating that the site was succumbing to "years of government pressure"; as a result, both the First Amendment and CDA Section 230 were imperiled. Lois Lee, founder of the anti-trafficking organization Children of the Night, bemoaned the loss of Backpage as an investigative tool, saying that child prostitution "existed long before Backpage or the Internet", and that Backpage is "not the cause or even a cause". Instead, they argued that Backpage provided "an opportunity to better attack the problem".

The NCMEC applauded the takedown in a statement, saying it was "gratified to know that as a result of the recent decision, a child is now less likely to be sold for sex on Backpage."

Kristen DiAngelo, executive director of the Sex Workers Outreach Project of Sacramento, criticized the shutdown, describing how many sex workers across the United States no longer had a way to support themselves. Backpage allowed for sex workers using the site to post bad date lists, screen clients, and communicate with other sex workers to ensure for the safest possible experience. Activists argued that the move would force some of the site's users to work on the street. An article from Reason published in April 2023 supported this claim with the headline "5 years after the Backpage shutdown, sex workers—and free speech—are still suffering", and "the shutdown is still worsening the lives it was supposed to improve."

Lacey and Larkin sold the site to Ferrer in 2015. The PSI subpoenaed all three, along with two current Backpage execs, to be present at the January 10 hearing. In response to attempted questioning from senators on the subcommittee, each witness declined to answer, "based on the rights provided by the Fifth and First Amendments" to the Constitution.

Portman claimed that the subcommittee's investigators discovered that Backpage had created a "filter" to delete "hundreds of words indicative of sex trafficking or prostitution before publication"—words such as "Lolita", "teen", "young", and so forth, ostensibly to hide questionable ads from law enforcement.

Techdirt editor Mike Masnick later wrote that such moderation was actually encouraged by Section 230's safe harbor, stating that one could "quite clearly see this as Backpage letting users know that it is not a place that should be used for sex trafficking, because it clearly alerts them to things that they don't want on the site." Masnick also noted that the same day as the hearing, Backpage had won another legal battle when the Supreme Court refused to hear an appeal of a lower court's dismissal of Jane Doe, et al. v. Backpage.com.

In a piece on the hearing, Elizabeth Nolan Brown, a senior editor at Reason magazine, wrote that the terms in question did not necessarily indicate sex trafficking, since, for example, "teen" could apply to 18 and 19-year-olds, who were "both 'teens' and, legally, adults". She also quoted the NCMEC as stating that "It is virtually impossible to determine how old the young women in these ads are without an in-depth criminal investigation".

But Portman, McCaskill and others saw these moderation practices as nefarious. In his concluding remarks, Portman stated that, "Backpage deliberately sanitized [these ads] to conceal evidence of prostitution, to conceal evidence of child trafficking", and as a result had allegedly broken the law. Portman said that he and McCaskill would promptly consider whether to refer this matter to the Department of Justice (DOJ) ... for further investigation."

By April 2017, The Arizona Republic was reporting that a federal grand jury had been impaneled in Phoenix and was considering indictments of Lacey and Larkin.

=== Federal prosecution ===
In late March 2018 and early April 2018, courts in Massachusetts and Florida ruled that Backpage's moderation practices may have fallen outside the immunity from civil suits granted by Section 230. The latter ruling argued that because Backpage "materially contributed to the content of the advertisement" by censoring specific keywords, it became a publisher of content and thus no longer protected.

Backpage's adult services sections became the subject of an investigation by the Federal Bureau of Investigation, the United States Postal Inspection Service, the United States Department of Justice, the Internal Revenue Service Criminal Investigator Division, with analytical assistance from the Joint Regional Intelligence Center over accusations that the website knowingly allowed and encouraged users to post ads related to prostitution and human trafficking, particularly involving minors, and took steps to intentionally obfuscate these activities.

On April 6, 2018, Backpage was seized by the FBI and other federal agencies, and Michael Lacey's home was raided by authorities. Lacey was arrested at gunpoint that day at his home in Paradise Valley; Larkin was arrested at an airport in Phoenix before exiting the plane, having returned from a trip overseas. Lacey was charged with money laundering and violations of the Travel Act.

On April 9, 2018, the US Department of Justice's indictment against Backpage was unsealed. The 93 counts included "conspiracy to facilitate prostitution using a facility in interstate or foreign commerce, facilitating prostitution using a facility in interstate or foreign commerce, conspiracy to commit money laundering, concealment money laundering, international promotional money laundering, and transactional money laundering." According to prosecutors, the seven people charged in the indictment are Michael Lacey of Paradise Valley, Arizona; James Larkin of Paradise Valley, Arizona; Scott Spear of Scottsdale, Arizona; John E. "Jed" Brunst of Phoenix, Arizona; Daniel Hyer of Dallas, Texas; Andrew Padilla of Plano, Texas; and Jaala Joye Vaught of Addison, Texas.

Its CEO, Carl Ferrer, pleaded guilty to charges of facilitating prostitution and money laundering, acknowledging that "the great majority" of the adult advertisements on Backpage were actually advertisements for prostitution. As part of his plea agreement Ferrer agreed to shut down the site and give its data to law enforcement. He agreed to testify against other alleged co-conspirators, such as but not limited to founders Michael Lacey and James Larkin. Backpage also pleaded guilty to human trafficking.

In July 2018, the grand jury in Phoenix issued a superseding indictment, increasing the total number of charges to 100, though the nature of the charges remained the same. The new indictment focused on 50 distinct adult ads culled from the millions of adult and non-adult ads that ran on the site daily, and the indictment used the fact that Backpage had worked with law enforcement to show that Backpage's executives were aware of illegal content on the site.

In August 2018, Backpage sales and marketing director Dan Hyer pleaded guilty to conspiracy to facilitate prostitution, while all other charges against him were dropped; the remaining six defendants pleaded not guilty to all charges.

The jury trial began in federal court in Phoenix, Arizona on September 1, 2021. In his opening statement, federal prosecutor Reginald Jones claimed that the site's owners and operators were aware that Backpage was being used for illegal activity, specifically prostitution, "but they didn't shut down the website." Defense attorneys countered that the adult services ads posted to Backpage were controversial, but still protected by the First Amendment.

Prosecutors called four witnesses during the eight days of trial: Special Agent Brian Fichtner of the California Office of the Attorney General; Sharon Cooper, a physician who works with trafficking victims; Jessika Svendgard; and Svendgard's mother Nacole Svendgard.

According to The Arizona Republic, Jessika Svendgard testified that she had been lured into a 105-day stint as a prostitute at age 15, where she would be "raped for money". She said both she and her trafficker advertised on Backpage, indicating falsely that she was 18 at the time. Under cross-examination, she indicated that she had never "met, spoken to, or communicated in writing" with any of the six defendants. Her struggle in suing Backpage and obtaining a settlement in Washington state was depicted in the 2017 anti-Backpage documentary I Am Jane Doe.

Special Agent Brian Fichtner testified about his investigation into Backpage on behalf of the California Attorney General's Office under then-Attorney General Kamala Harris, which led to the arrests on pimping charges of Lacey, Larkin and Ferrer in 2016. (Though the pimping charges were twice dismissed, state money-laundering charges against the defendants survived.) According to Reason magazine, the prosecution called Fichtner "to present Backpage ads that he and federal prosecutors deemed to be clear evidence of illegal sex work", but Fichtner conceded that "none of the ads alone would be enough to justify a prostitution arrest."

Sharon Cooper described her work with sex trafficking victims and "casually mentioned child victims" of sex trafficking "throughout her testimony", as reported by The Arizona Republic.

On September 14, 2021, federal Judge Susan Brnovich declared a mistrial in the case, saying that prosecution had abused the leeway she had given it by making constant references to child sex trafficking rather than focusing on the crimes the defendants were charged with, namely facilitating prostitution.

"The government, as prosecutors, are held to a higher standard", Brnovich said. "Their goal is not to win at any costs, but their goal is to win by the rules."

The trial had been expected to last two to three months. Brnovich granted the defense motion for mistrial on day eight.

Brnovich then set an October 5 status hearing in the case.

At the October 5 hearing, Brnovich scheduled a new trial for February 22, 2022.

Brnovich recused herself over a conflict of interest with her husband, who was Arizona Attorney General Mark Brnovich, on October 29, 2021, and federal Judge Diane Humetewa was chosen by lot to replace her, becoming the fourth judge to be assigned the case so far. A new trial has been delayed as the defense appeals Humetewa's denial of a motion to dismiss the case for good.

On September 2, 2022, a three-judge panel of the Ninth Circuit Court of Appeals heard oral arguments in the defense's appeal of Humetewa's ruling. Defendants argued that the case should be dismissed because a new trial would violate the Fifth Amendment's prohibition on double jeopardy. Though the defendants had moved for the mistrial, their attorneys argued that the prosecution "goaded" them into doing so by engaging in intentional misconduct; specifically, by focusing too much on the subject of child-sex trafficking.

On September 21, 2022, the appeals panel ruled against the defendants, upholding Humetewa's ruling and finding that the prosecution "had no reason to sabotage its own trial". The decision reportedly made it likely that Lacey, Larkin, et al. would face a retrial sometime in 2023.

On July 31, 2023, co-owner and co-founder James Larkin committed suicide about one week before the new trial was scheduled to start.

In November 2023 a jury found co-founder Michael Lacey guilty of one count of money laundering and acquitted him of another money-laundering charge, but deadlocked on 84 other charges, leading to a second mistrial.

In January 2024, Lacey's third trial began. In August 2024 Lacey was sentenced to five years in federal prison and ordered to pay a $3 million fine. He turned himself in on September 11 to begin his sentence, but was released on bond in November 2024 after appealing his prison sentence.

== Subsequent history ==
President Donald Trump signed FOSTA/SESTA into law on April 11, 2018, a law making it illegal to promote or facilitate prostitution. The new law also created an exception to CDA Section 230, removing an interactive computer service's immunity from civil and criminal state laws regarding sex trafficking. The law's proponents claimed that it was needed to crack down on Backpage, which they accused of facilitating sex trafficking through its adult section. However, the defendants in the Backpage case were not charged under SESTA/FOSTA, but under the U.S. Travel Act and money-laundering statutes. The defendants were arrested on April 6, 2018, a week before the signing of the bill. On June 17, 2020, Wilhan Martono was arrested by the United States Secret Service under FOSTA for running cityxguide, a replacement for Backpage's human-trafficking operations.

In January 2025, the seizure notice was removed from Backpage's webpage and the domain became defunct. Sometime before late March 2025, the domain now redirects to the domain milfs.com.

=== DOJ Memos ===
U.S. Department of Justice memos from 2012 and 2013, obtained by Reason and published in August 2019, revealed that Backpage actively fought against child prostitution on the website. Reason reported that federal prosecutors accidentally sent the memos to defense lawyers in the Backpage case sometime in 2018 as part of discovery, but the memos were placed under seal and could not be used at trial.

Attorneys at the U.S. Attorney's Office for the Western District of Washington wrote both memos, assessing the possibilities of a successful prosecution of Backpage. The 2012 memo paraphrased an FBI agent with the Innocence Lost Task Force stating that, "unlike virtually every other website that is used for prostitution and sex trafficking, Backpage is remarkably responsive to law enforcement requests and often takes proactive steps to assist in investigations."

According to the 2012 memo, Backpage employees testified in criminal cases, answered subpoenas within 24 hours (sometimes within the hour), and gave law enforcement information without a subpoena in "exigent circumstances", such as a missing child. Law enforcement was able to "contact Backpage and obtain immediate removal of certain posts" suspected of involving juveniles. Backpage's age-verification protocol was imperfect, but standard in the industry, and it reported ads suspected of involving child sex trafficking to the NCMEC. The memo concludes that "any prosecution of Backpage would likely have to overcome Backpage's efforts to actively cooperate with law enforcement."

The 2013 memo was also skeptical of a successful prosecution, stating, "[W]e have yet to uncover compelling evidence of criminal intent or a pattern of reckless conduct regarding minors." It described how Backpage's moderation changed over time, and paraphrased the NCMEC's then-president and CEO, Ernie Allen as saying that he believed Backpage wanted child sex trafficking off its site, but that "the use of the Internet to market commercial sex was so fluid that any system of moderation and reporting was destined to fail". The memo suggests that the government may want to consider going after Backpage using money-laundering statutes.

==== Hacking/Hustling survey ====
Published in January 2020, a survey of sex workers by the sex-worker-rights group Hacking/Hustling indicated that sex workers suffered in the wake of SESTA/FOSTA's passage and the federal government's seizure of Backpage. According to The Daily Beast, the survey found that "33.8 percent of respondents reported an increase in violence from clients after the law was signed, and 72.5 percent reported they were facing increased financial insecurity", and sex-worker rights advocates "related stories of sex workers who were thrust into the arms of pimps in order to find work, or back into abusive relationships for want of somewhere to stay."

==== GAO report ====
In June 2021, the U.S. Governmental Accountability Office (GAO) released a report, stating that SESTA/FOSTA had only been used once by the DOJ since it was passed in 2018. Both SESTA/FOSTA and the takedown of Backpage using other statutes had caused the adult online ad market to fragment and scatter to sites hosted in other countries.

The GAO report concludes that the seizure of Backpage has had an adverse effect on federal law enforcement's ability to investigate sex trafficking cases. It reads:

gathering evidence to bring cases against users of online platforms has also become more difficult. According to a 2019 FBI document, the FBI's ability to identify and locate sex trafficking victims and perpetrators was significantly decreased following the takedown of backpage.com. According to FBI officials, this is largely because law enforcement was familiar with backpage.com, and backpage.com was generally responsive to legal requests for information. In contrast, officials said, law enforcement may be less familiar with platforms located overseas. Further, obtaining evidence from entities overseas may be more cumbersome and time-intensive, as those who control such platforms may not voluntarily respond to legal process, and mutual legal assistance requests may take months, if not years, according to DOJ officials. Despite these investigative challenges, DOJ officials said they are committed to holding accountable those who control online platforms that promote sex trafficking.

=== Alleged victims ===
On April 9, 2018, the US Department of Justice's indictment against Backpage was unsealed. One 15-year-old is alleged to have been forced to do in-calls at hotels. A second teenager was allegedly told to "perform sexual acts at gunpoint and choked" until she had seizures, before being gang raped. A third victim, advertised under the pseudonym "Nadia", was stabbed to death, while a fourth victim was murdered in 2015, and her corpse deliberately burned. The lawyer for Backpage operations manager Andrew Padilla stated that his client was "not legally responsible for any actions of third parties under U.S. law. He is no more responsible than the owner of a community billboard when someone places an ad on it".

In October 2018, a Texas woman sued Backpage and Facebook, claiming she had been sex trafficked on Backpage by a man who lured her into prostitution by posing as her friend on the social media network. On April 15, 2019, a Wisconsin man was convicted on federal sex trafficking charges over victims who he brought across state lines, forced into prostitution and advertised on Backpage. On April 29, 2019, a former middle school teacher from Florida was sentenced to 10 years in federal prison for paying for sex with a 14-year-old girl who was advertised on Backpage.
