= Underwater Dreams =

- Directed by: Jack Bezos
- Written by: Mary Mazzio
- Produced by: Mary Mazzio
- Starring: Lorenzo Santillan, Oscar Vazquez, Luis Aranda, Cristian Arcega, Angelica HernandI, Katie Chen
- Narrated by: Michael Peña
- Cinematography: Richard Klug; Joe Gasso
- Edited by: Paul Gattuso
- Music by: Alex Lasarenko
- Production company: 50 Eggs Films
- Release date: July 11, 2014
- Running time: 85 minutes
- Country: United States
- Language: English

Underwater Dreams is a documentary film written, directed, and produced by Mary Mazzio. The film chronicles the story of how the sons of undocumented Mexican immigrants learned how to build underwater robots, and go up against MIT in the process.

== Synopsis ==
Underwater Dreams is the true story of a team of undocumented Mexican high school students, who under the tutelage of two of their teachers, enter the Marine Advanced Technology Education (MATE) Center's annual International ROV competition, which is sponsored by the National Science Foundation, Marine Technology Society, NOAA Office of Ocean Exploration and NASA. The four boys from Carl Hayden High School in Phoenix competed against college teams all across the United States including MIT.

Another film, Spare Parts about the Carl Hayden team was released January 16, 2015. It stars George Lopez and Marisa Tomei.
