= George Guthridge =

American author and educator (born 1948)

- Born: May 14, 1948; Vancouver, Washington, U.S.
- Died: August 8, 2025 (aged 77); Suphan Buri, Thailand
- Education: Portland State University (BA); University of Montana (MFA); University of Alaska Fairbanks (PhD); Arizona State University
- Occupations: Author; educator

George Guthridge (born May 14, 1948 – August 8, 2025) was an American author and educator. He has published over 70 short stories and five novels and has been acclaimed for his successes teaching writing and critical/creative thinking. In 1997 he and coauthor Janet Berliner won the Bram Stoker Award for the Year's Best Horror Novel.

== Early life and education ==
Guthridge earned a B.A. in English from Portland State University in 1970, and a Master of Fine Arts in creative writing from the University of Montana. He earned a PhD from the University of Alaska Fairbanks in 2010 and also took doctoral courses at Arizona State University.

== Speculative fiction ==
In the mid-1970s, Guthridge was teaching English at Loras College. A colleague in the department had received a grant to attend a science fiction convention in Milwaukee, but was unable to attend, so Guthridge went instead ("because Milwaukee is famous for beer"), although he confesses that at that time he despised science fiction and fantasy. At the convention, Guthridge met George R. R. Martin, who persuaded him to give speculative fiction a second look, and to write in the field himself. "George changed my life, he really did," Guthridge says. "Not just because he opened doors for me, but he opened this whole vista of sci-fi and fantasy and horror that I never would've gotten into." In turn, Guthridge later helped Martin find a job at Clarke College. (Martin had been operating chess tournaments to supplement his writing income, but "wasn't making enough money to stay alive," says Guthridge.) Guthridge has been a finalist for the Hugo Award and twice for the Nebula Award for science fiction and fantasy. In 1998 he and coauthor, Janet Berliner, won the Bram Stoker Award for the year's best horror novel.

== "The Kids from Nowhere" ==
From 1982, Guthridge coached school pupils in the Siberian Yupik Eskimo village of Gambell, Alaska, on the remote St. Lawrence Island in the Bering Sea, to national championships in academics. They became the only Native American team ever to do that—and they did it twice. Guthridge's memoir of his years in Gambell was published as The Kids from Nowhere in 2006.

== Publications ==
Novels

- The Madagascar Manifesto (omnibus) (2002)^{1}
- Children of the Dusk (1997)^{1} Bram Stoker Award Winner
- Child of the Journey (1996)^{1}
- The Bloodletter (1994)
- Child of the Light (1991)^{1}
- The Death Mask of Pancho Villa (1987)^{2}

Nonfiction

- The Kids from Nowhere: The Story behind the Arctic Educational Miracle (2006)

Selected Short Fiction

- The Bridge (2011)
- Katoey (2008)^{3}
- Nine Whispered Opinions Regarding the Alaskan Secession (2004)
- The Silence of Phii Krasue (2000)
- Mister Pigman (1999)
- Something's Got to Give (1999)^{1}
- Notes Toward a Rumpled Stillskin (1997)
- Chin Oil (1997)
- Mirror of Lop Nor (1995)
- The I of the Eye of the Worm (1997)^{1}
- Maskal (1996)^{1}
- The Faliksotra (1995) ^{1}
- Inyanga (1995)^{1}
- Song of the Shofar (1994)^{1}
- The Macaw (1994)^{4}
- The Tower (1994)
- Snowcoil (1993)
- Exhibition (1988)
- Philatelist (1988)
- Evolutions (1988)
- Recession (1987)
- See the Station Master (1984)
- Memory's Noose (1984)^{4}
- Legacy (1983)^{5}
- Champion of the World (1982)^{4}
- Triangle (1982)^{5}
- The Child (1982)
- The Quiet (1982)
- Blackmail (1982)
- Taken on Faith (1982)
- Pinnacle (1982)
- Ishbar, the Trueborn (1981)
- Jahratta Dki (1980)
- Oregon (1979)
- Warship (1979)^{6}
- The Exiled, the Hunted (1977)
- Dolls' Demise (1976)

    1 with Janet Berliner
    2 with Carol Gaskins
    3 with Blythe Ayne
    4 with Steve Perry
    5 with Dianne Thompson
    6 with George R.R. Martin

== Writing awards ==
- 1982 - Finalist, Nebula Award, "The Quiet" (science fiction short story)
- 1982 - Finalist, Hugo Award, "The Quiet" (science fiction short story)
- 1994 - Finalist, Nebula Award, "The Mirror of Lop Nor" (fantasy novelette)
- 1997 - Co-Winner, Bram Stoker Award, Year's Best Horror Novel (with Janet Berliner)
- 2007 - Finalist, Benjamin Franklin Award, Year's Best Book about Education, The Kids from Nowhere
- 2013 - First Place, Las Vegas International Film Festival, The Kids from Nowhere (screenplay), with Deborah Schildt
- 2013 - First Place, Moondance International Film Festival, The Kids from Nowhere (screenplay), with Deborah Schildt
- 2013 - First Place, Silent River International Film Festival, The Kids from Nowhere (screenplay), with Deborah Schildt
- 2013 - First Place, New Hampshire International Film Festival, The Kids from Nowhere (screenplay), with Deborah Schildt
- 2013 - Finalist, Portland International Film Festival, The Kids from Nowhere (screenplay), with Deborah Schildt
- 2013 - Second Place, Kay Snow Writing Competition, The Kids from Nowhere (screenplay), with Deborah Schildt

== Educational awards and achievements ==
- 1984 Future Problem Solving National Coach of the Year
- 1988 First Alaskan to be awarded Christa McAuliffe Fellowship
- 1990 Named (Simon & Schuster, Inc.) as one of America's top 78 teachers
- 1993 Profiled (Delacorte Press) as one of world's top educators
- 1996 Fulbright Scholar: Trained professors in the Caribbean
- 2001 Co-recipient, Alaska's first Distance Educator of the Year Award
- 2010 University of Alaska Fairbanks Exemplary Service Award
- 2013 University of Alaska Fairbanks Outstanding Faculty Advisor Award
- 2015 Professor Emeritus, University of Alaska Fairbanks
- 2018 Teaching Recognition Award, University of Maryland University College
- 2019 Finalist, Stanley J. Drazek Award for Teaching Excellence, University of Maryland University College

Guthridge also helped develop the Rural Alaska Honors Institute (RAHI). It has become one of the nation's top college preparatory programs for Native Americans. Over 2000 of its graduates have gone on to college success, including at such institutions as Harvard, Dartmouth, Yale, Notre Dame, Stanford, Berkeley, West Point, Annapolis, and the Air Force Academy.

== See also ==
- Bram Stoker Award for Best Novel
- Time Machine (book series)
- Nebula Award for Best Short Story
