= 50 Eggs Films =

- Industry: Documentary
- Founded: 2000
- Founder: Mary Mazzio
- Headquarters: Wellesley, Massachusetts, United States
- Key people: Mary Mazzio, Richard Klug, Joe Grasso, Paul Gattuso, Richard Schultz, Collin Cameron, Alex Lasarenko, Sheldon Mirowitz
- Website: 50eggs.com

50 Eggs Films is an independent film production company based in Babson Park, Wellesley, Massachusetts, United States. It specializes in inspirational true stories of individuals in education, business and athletics.

== Filmography ==
Year	Title	Notes
1999	A Hero for Daisy	
2002	Apple Pie	
2004	Lemonade Stories	
2009	Ten9Eight: Shoot for the Moon	
2011	The Apple Pushers	
2013	Contrarian	
2014	Underwater Dreams	
2017	I am Jane Doe	
2020	A Most Beautiful Thing	
2024	Bad River	
