= Alec Sokolow =

American screenwriter

- Occupation: Screenwriter
- Relatives: Sam Sokolow (brother)
- Writing career
- Years active: 1992–present
- Notable works: Toy Story; Cheaper by the Dozen; Evan Almighty

Alec Sokolow is an American screenwriter, filmmaker, producer, and educator. He is best known as one of the screenwriters of the animated feature Toy Story (1995), for which he and his co-writers were nominated for the Academy Award for Best Original Screenplay. He has also written or co-written Money Talks, Goodbye Lover, Cheaper by the Dozen, Garfield: The Movie, Garfield: A Tail of Two Kitties, Evan Almighty, and The Inseparables. He frequently works with writing partner Joel Cohen.

== Early life and education ==
Sokolow was born in New York City in 1963. He attended the University of Pennsylvania, where he earned a Bachelor of Arts degree in communications in 1985.

His first paid writing work was as a contributor to National Lampoon. He worked as a writer and segment producer on television programs including The Late Show, The Wilton North Report, and The Arsenio Hall Show.

== Career ==
In 1995, Sokolow was among the screenwriters of Toy Story, directed by John Lasseter and produced by Pixar. The screenplay was credited to Sokolow, Cohen, Andrew Stanton, and Joss Whedon, with story contributions from Lasseter, Pete Docter, Stanton, and Joe Ranft. The film became the first feature-length computer-animated film and received a nomination for the Academy Award for Best Original Screenplay, making it the first animated film to receive an Academy Award nomination in a writing category.

Sokolow and Cohen subsequently worked together on Money Talks (1997), Goodbye Lover (1998), Cheaper by the Dozen (2003), Garfield: The Movie (2004), Garfield: A Tail of Two Kitties (2006), and other projects. Their collaboration on Garfield was discussed in a 2015 interview with Script Magazine, in which the two writers described their approach to writing the film and their broader screenwriting partnership.

In 2009, The Hollywood Reporter reported that Sokolow and Cohen had sold an original animated screenplay titled Q to Starz Media Animation. The project was inspired by Don Quixote and centered on marionettes in Central Park who leave their theater for an adventure.

Sokolow and Cohen later developed the story that became the animated feature The Inseparables (Les Inséparables). The 2023 film, directed by Jérémie Degruson, credits Cohen and Sokolow with the story and writing of the original screenplay. Degruson said in a 2023 interview that the original script had been written by Cohen and Sokolow and was more closely connected to the Don Quixote source material.

Sokolow taught an advanced screenwriting course at the University of Pennsylvania in 2006 and has taught or served as an instructor at institutions including Loyola Marymount University, Stony Brook University, and New York University.

=== Video games ===
Sokolow co-authored the meta-mythology and storyline and created characters for Activision's Skylanders video-game series.

=== Filmmaking ===
Sokolow was a producer of the 2017 documentary I Am Jane Doe, directed by Mary Mazzio and narrated by Jessica Chastain.

Sokolow also co-wrote I Am Little Red, a 2017 animated short.

== Selected writing credits ==
=== Movies ===
- NBA All-Star Stay in School Jam (1992)
- Monster Mash: The Movie (1995) (with Joel Cohen, also directed)
- Toy Story (1995) (with Joss Whedon, Andrew Stanton and Joel Cohen)
- Money Talks (1997)
- Goodbye Lover (1998) (with Ron Peer)
- Cheaper by the Dozen (2003) (with Sam Harper and Joel Cohen)
- Garfield: The Movie (2004) (with Joel Cohen)
- Garfield: A Tail of Two Kitties (2006) (with Joel Cohen)
- Evan Almighty (2007) (story credit with Steve Oedekerk and Joel Cohen)
- Daddy Day Camp (2007) (story credit with Geoff Rodkey and Joel Cohen)
- Gnomes and Trolls: The Secret Chamber (2008) (with Salvatore Cardoni and Joel Cohen)
- The Last Godfather (2010) (uncredited)
- Shooting an Elephant (2016) (Sokolow only)
- I am Jane Doe (2017) (Producer)
- I Am Little Red (2017)
- Magic Arch 3D (2020)
- Norm of the North: Family Vacation (2020)
- Rock Dog 2: Rock Around the Park (2021)

=== Video games ===
- Skylanders: Spyro's Adventure (2011) (with Joel Cohen and Marianne Krawczyk)
