= Grant Hill =

American basketball executive and former player (born 1972)

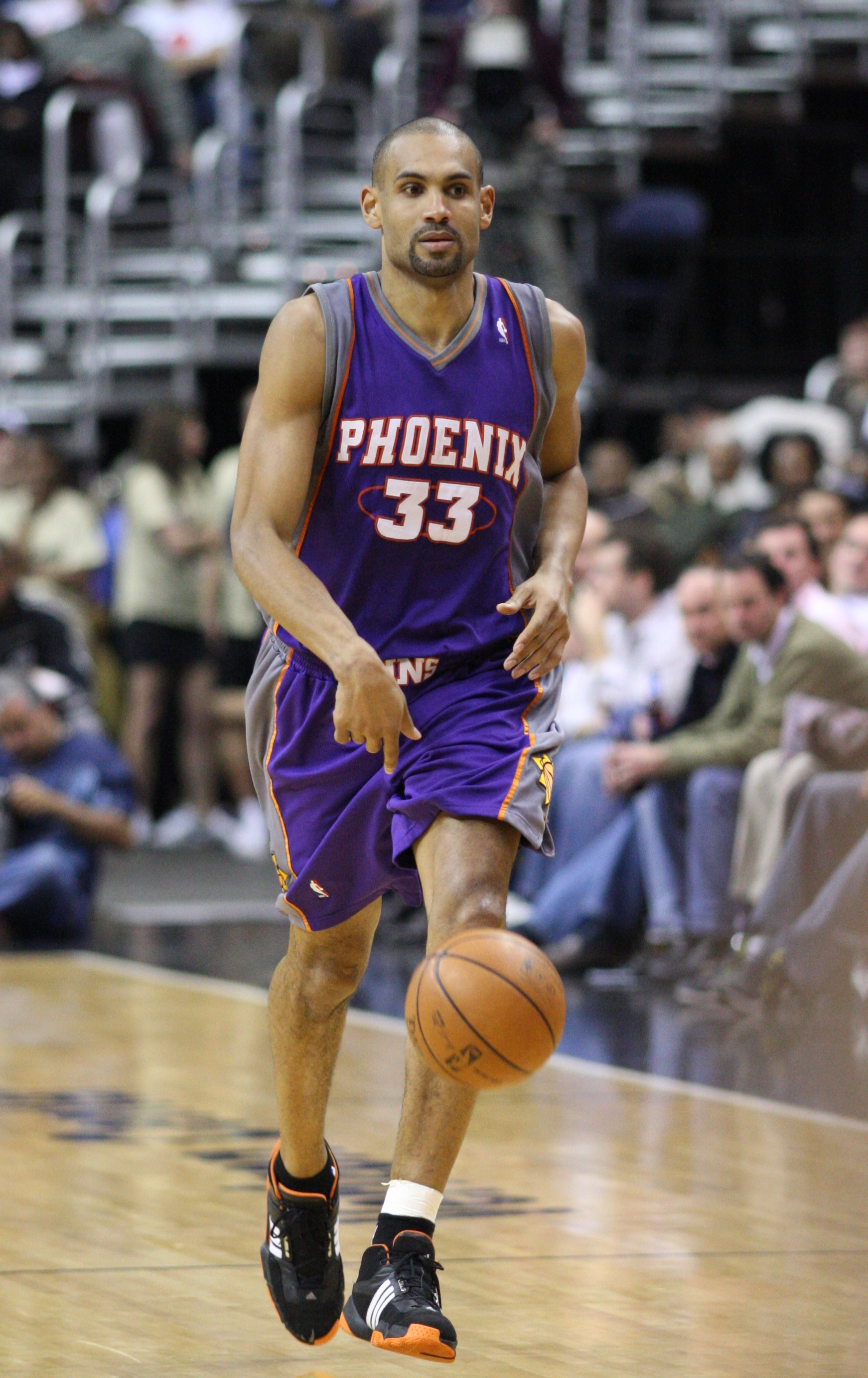
- Hill with the Phoenix Suns in 2007

Atlanta Hawks
- Title: Vice Chair of the Board
- League: NBA

Personal information
- Born: October 5, 1972 (age 54) Dallas, Texas, U.S.
- Listed height: 6 ft 8 in (2.03 m)
- Listed weight: 225 lb (102 kg)

Career information
- High school: South Lakes (Reston, Virginia)
- College: Duke (1990–1994)
- NBA draft: 1994: 1st round, 3rd overall pick
- Drafted by: Detroit Pistons
- Playing career: 1994–2013
- Position: Small forward
- Number: 33

Career history
- 1994–2000: Detroit Pistons
- 2000–2007: Orlando Magic
- 2007–2012: Phoenix Suns
- 2012–2013: Los Angeles Clippers

Career highlights
- 7× NBA All-Star (1995–1998, 2000, 2001, 2005); All-NBA First Team (1997); 4× All-NBA Second Team (1996, 1998–2000); NBA Rookie of the Year (1995); NBA All-Rookie First Team (1995); 2× NCAA Champion (1991, 1992); Consensus first-team All-American (1994); Consensus second-team All-American (1993); NABC Defensive Player of the Year (1993); ACC Player of the Year (1994); 2× First-team All-ACC (1993, 1994); Second-team All-ACC (1992); No. 33 retired by Duke Blue Devils; Third-team Parade All-American (1990); McDonald's All-American (1990); Virginia Mr. Basketball (1990); NCAA Gerald R. Ford Award (2017)

Career NBA statistics
- Points: 17,137 (16.7 ppg)
- Rebounds: 6,169 (6.0 rpg)
- Assists: 4,252 (4.1 apg)
- Stats at NBA.com
- Stats at Basketball Reference
- Basketball Hall of Fame
- Collegiate Basketball Hall of Fame
Medals
Men's basketball
Representing the United States
Olympic Games
Gold medal – first place	1996 Atlanta	Men's basketball
Pan American Games
Bronze medal – third place	1991 Havana	National team
FIBA Americas U18 Championship
Gold medal – first place	1990 Montevideo	National team

Grant Henry Hill (born October 5, 1972) is an American professional basketball executive and former player who is a co-owner of the Atlanta Hawks of the National Basketball Association (NBA) and a part-owner of Orlando City SC of Major League Soccer (MLS) and Orlando Pride of the National Women's Soccer League (NWSL). He is also part of an ownership group that purchased the Baltimore Orioles in 2024. Hill also works as a basketball analyst for CBS, NBC and Turner Sports.

A four-year player at Duke University, Hill was touted as one of the greatest college basketball players ever. In the NBA, he played for the Detroit Pistons, the Orlando Magic, the Phoenix Suns, and the Los Angeles Clippers, mostly at the small forward position. Hill is a seven-time NBA All-Star, a five-time All-NBA selection, and a three-time winner of the NBA Sportsmanship Award. In 2018, he was inducted into the Naismith Basketball Hall of Fame.

The 1994 ACC Player of the Year, a two-time NCAA All-American, and a two-time NCAA champion, Hill is generally considered one of the best ever to play for the Duke Blue Devils.

After graduating in 1994, Hill was selected by the Pistons with the third overall pick in the NBA draft. He was the co-winner of the 1995 NBA Rookie of the Year Award with Jason Kidd. Early in his NBA career, Hill was widely considered one of the best all-around players in the game, often leading his team in points, rebounds and assists. In his first six seasons in the NBA, Hill averaged 21.6 points, 7.9 rebounds, and 6.3 assists per game and made the Eastern Conference All-Star Team five times.

An ankle injury in 2000 changed the trajectory of his career. It plagued him for several years, led to a March 2003 surgery that was followed by life-threatening complications, and forced him to miss the entire 2003–04 season. In 2005, Hill made the Eastern Conference All-Star Team as a member of the Magic. He played in the Western Conference Finals in 2010 with the Phoenix Suns. In the 12 seasons after his ankle injury, Hill averaged 13.1 points, 4.7 rebounds, and 2.6 assists per game. On June 1, 2013, Hill announced his retirement from the NBA.

In 2015, Hill and Tony Ressler were part of an ownership group that purchased the Atlanta Hawks. In 2023, Hill and his wife, Tamia became part owners of MLS club Orlando City and NWSL club, Orlando Pride.

== College career ==
When the time came to choose a college, Hill's mother told the Fox Sports documentary Beyond the Glory, that she wanted him to attend Georgetown, while his father preferred the University of North Carolina. Hill decided to attend Duke University, playing four years with the Blue Devils and winning national titles in 1991 and 1992. Duke became the first Division I program to win consecutive titles since UCLA in 1966–73. Despite losing two of the biggest contributors on the Blue Devils, Christian Laettner (in 1992) and Bobby Hurley (each of whom went on to play in the NBA), Hill led Duke to the championship game once again in 1994, but lost to the Arkansas Razorbacks. Hill won the Henry Iba Corinthian Award as the nation's top defensive player in 1993, and in 1994 he was the ACC Player of the Year. During his collegiate career, Hill became the first player in ACC history to collect more than 1,900 points, 700 rebounds, 400 assists, 200 steals, and 100 blocked shots. As a result of his successful college career, he became the eighth player in Duke history to have his jersey number (33) retired. After his freshman season at Duke, Hill played on the bronze medal-winning U.S. team at the 1991 Pan American Games, held in Havana, Cuba. As an amateur, Hill was also part of the select team of college players that prepared and scrimmaged against the eventual U.S. men's basketball team ("Dream Team") for the 1992 Barcelona Olympics.

Hill also is widely known for his role in the Hail Mary play in the NCAA tournament regional final against Kentucky in 1992, which is considered by many to be one of the greatest college basketball games of all time. With Duke down 103–102 in overtime and 2.1 seconds remaining after Kentucky's Sean Woods hit a floater, an unguarded Hill heaved the inbounds pass 75 feet across the court into the hands of Laettner, who dribbled once and spun before pulling up to make the game-winning jumper from just outside the free-throw line as time expired. Hill later produced a film, Duke 91 & 92: Back to Back about the team's consecutive wins and this game-winning play. In 2016, Hill was inducted into the Duke Sports Hall of Fame

Touted as one of the best players in Duke history, many went as far as to say that Hill was one of the greatest college basketball players of his era. In 2002, Hill was named to the ACC 50th Anniversary men's basketball team honoring the fifty greatest players in ACC History.

== Professional career ==
=== Detroit Pistons (1994–2000) ===
Hill was drafted by the Detroit Pistons with the third pick in the NBA draft after graduating from Duke in 1994. He generally played the small forward position during his NBA career. In his first season, he averaged 19.9 points, 6.4 rebounds, 5.0 assists and 1.77 steals per game, and became the first Pistons rookie since Isiah Thomas in 1981–82 to score 1,000 points. Hill ended up sharing NBA Rookie of the Year Award honors with Jason Kidd of the Dallas Mavericks, becoming the first Piston since Dave Bing in 1966–67 to win the award. Hill also won the Sporting News Rookie of the Year Award. He was named to the all-NBA First Team in 1997, and All-NBA Second Teams in 1996, 1998, 1999, and 2000. Hill also regularly played in the NBA All-Star Game, where he made history by being the first rookie to lead an NBA All-Star fan balloting in (1994–95) with 1,289,585 votes, narrowly defeating Shaquille O'Neal. Also, he became the first rookie in any of the four major professional sports leagues to lead all-star fan voting.

In his second season (1995–96), he once again led the All-Star fan balloting, this time edging Michael Jordan (Jordan's first All-Star game after returning since retiring in 1993). During the 1995–96 season, Hill showcased his all-round abilities by leading the NBA in triple-doubles (10). He also won a gold medal at the 1996 Summer Olympics in Atlanta as a member of the U.S. men's basketball team, where he had the team's fifth-highest scoring average (9.7) and led the team in steals (18). In 1996–97 season, Hill averaged 21.4 points, 9.0 rebounds, 7.3 assists, and 1.8 steals per game. He became the first player since Larry Bird in 1989–90 to average 20 points, 9 rebounds and 7 assists in a season, an accomplishment that had not been duplicated until Russell Westbrook averaged a triple-double in the 2016–17 NBA season. Once again, Hill led the league in triple-doubles, where his 13 triple-doubles represented 35 percent of the league's triple-double total that season. He was the league's Player of the Month for January and was also awarded NBA's IBM Award, given to the player with the biggest statistical contributions to his team. He finished third in MVP voting, behind Karl Malone and Michael Jordan.

Much like Scottie Pippen with the Bulls, Hill assumed the role of a "point forward" in Detroit, running the Pistons' offense. As a result, between the 1995–96 and 1998–99 NBA seasons, Hill was the league leader in assists per game among non-guards all four seasons. In the lockout-shortened 1999 season, as he led his team in points, rebounds and assists for the third time, Hill joined Wilt Chamberlain and Elgin Baylor as the only players in NBA history at the time to lead their teams in scoring, rebounding and assists more than once. Hill and Chamberlain were the only two players in league history to lead their teams in points, rebounds, and assists per game three times. Hill was selected to play in the 1998 FIBA World Championship, but in the end, no NBA players played in this tournament due to the lockout.

In the 1999–2000 season, Hill averaged 25.8 points while shooting 49% from the field, the season's third-highest scoring average, behind MVP Shaquille O'Neal and Allen Iverson. He averaged 6.6 rebounds and 5.2 assists per game. However, despite Hill's accomplishments in Detroit, the Pistons never made it far in the playoffs, either losing in the first round (1996, 1997 and 1999), or missing the playoffs entirely in the 1994–95 and 1997–98 seasons. The 2000 playoffs would be no different. On April 15, 2000, 7 days before the start of the playoffs, Hill sprained his left ankle in a game against the Philadelphia 76ers. He continued to play until the first-round playoff series against the Miami Heat, in which his injured ankle got worse, and Hill was forced to leave halfway through game 2. Eventually, the Heat swept the Pistons, 3–0. Hill was initially selected for the 2000 Olympics U.S. team, but could not play due to the ankle injury. That ankle injury would prove to be a major liability for many years to come.

After the first six seasons of his career, before the ankle injury, Hill had amassed a total of 9,393 points, 3,417 rebounds, and 2,720 assists. Oscar Robertson, Bird, Luka Doncic and LeBron James are the only four players in league history to eclipse these numbers after their first six seasons.

=== Orlando Magic (2000–2007) ===
As an unrestricted free agent, Hill had planned to sign with the Orlando Magic. On August 3, 2000, however, a sign-and-trade deal allowed Hill to receive a slightly more lucrative contract while Detroit received at least some compensation for losing him. The Pistons signed Hill to a seven-year, $92.8 million contract and traded him to Orlando for Chucky Atkins and Ben Wallace. The Magic hoped he would team up with budding superstar Tracy McGrady, who had been signed away from the Toronto Raptors at that time, to return Orlando among the NBA elite. But Hill was hampered by ankle injuries, playing in only four games in his first season with the Magic, 14 games in his second and 29 in his third. He was forced to sit out his entire fourth year with Orlando (2003–04). Despite missing so much time due to injury during his first seasons in Orlando, Hill still provided solid production when he was able to play, averaging 18.0 points, 8.8 rebounds, and 5.2 assists per 36 minutes during the 2002–03 NBA season. Meanwhile, his former team, the Pistons, who had defeated the Magic in the 2003 playoffs, but ended up losing to the New Jersey Nets in the Eastern Conference Finals, won the championship the following year in 2004.

In March 2003, Hill underwent a major surgical procedure in which doctors re-fractured his ankle and realigned it with his leg bone. Five days after the surgery was performed, Hill developed a 104.5 °F (40.3 °C) fever and convulsions and was rushed to a hospital. Doctors removed the splint around his ankle and discovered that Hill had contracted a potentially fatal methicillin-resistant Staphylococcus aureus (MRSA) infection. He was hospitalized for a week and had to take intravenous antibiotics for six months.

In the 2004–05 season Hill, though hampered by a bruised left shin that caused him to miss several games, started and played 67 games for the Magic. By then, the Magic had traded away McGrady for Steve Francis, another ball-dominant guard, in what was viewed as one of the biggest trades of the decade. Hill was named the Eastern Conference player of the week for the week between November 15–21, 2004. Over the season, Hill averaged 19.7 points per game on a .509 field goal percentage. Fans voted him an All-Star starter again, and he led the Eastern Conference All-Star Team to a victory over the West. Also, after the season, Hill was awarded the Joe Dumars Trophy presented to the NBA Sportsmanship Award Winner.

During the 2005–06 season Hill was once again injured frequently as nagging groin injuries kept him sidelined for much of the first half of the season, limiting him to 21 games. He got a sports hernia that was caused by uneven pressure on Hill's feet while he was running, due to concerns that he could re-aggravate the injury on his left ankle if it got too much pressure. Hill underwent surgery for the hernia and stated that he would consider retirement if he had to get another surgery.

In the 2006–07 season Hill returned from injuries despite numerous rumors surrounding his retirement. Hill received ankle rotation therapy from specialists in Vancouver, British Columbia, during the off-season, and stated that he had regained much motion in his left ankle. Hill returned to the Magic lineup, starting at the shooting guard position. Despite having problems with injuries to his left knee and a tendon in his left ankle, Hill managed to play 65 games, two short of the highest number of games he played over a single season as a member of the Magic. He finished the season with averages of 14.4 points, 3.6 rebounds and 2.1 assists per game. This season would see Hill return to the playoffs for the first time since 2000, his first playoff appearance with the Magic. The 8th seed Magic would meet Hill's old team, the Detroit Pistons, in the first round. The Pistons' vast playoff experience would prevail over the inexperienced Magic, who had not seen significant post-season action for some years, and despite having some close games, the series would end with a 4–0 Pistons sweep, leaving Hill undecided on whether to return for the 2007–08 season with the Magic, sign with another team or retire.

=== Phoenix Suns (2007–2012) ===
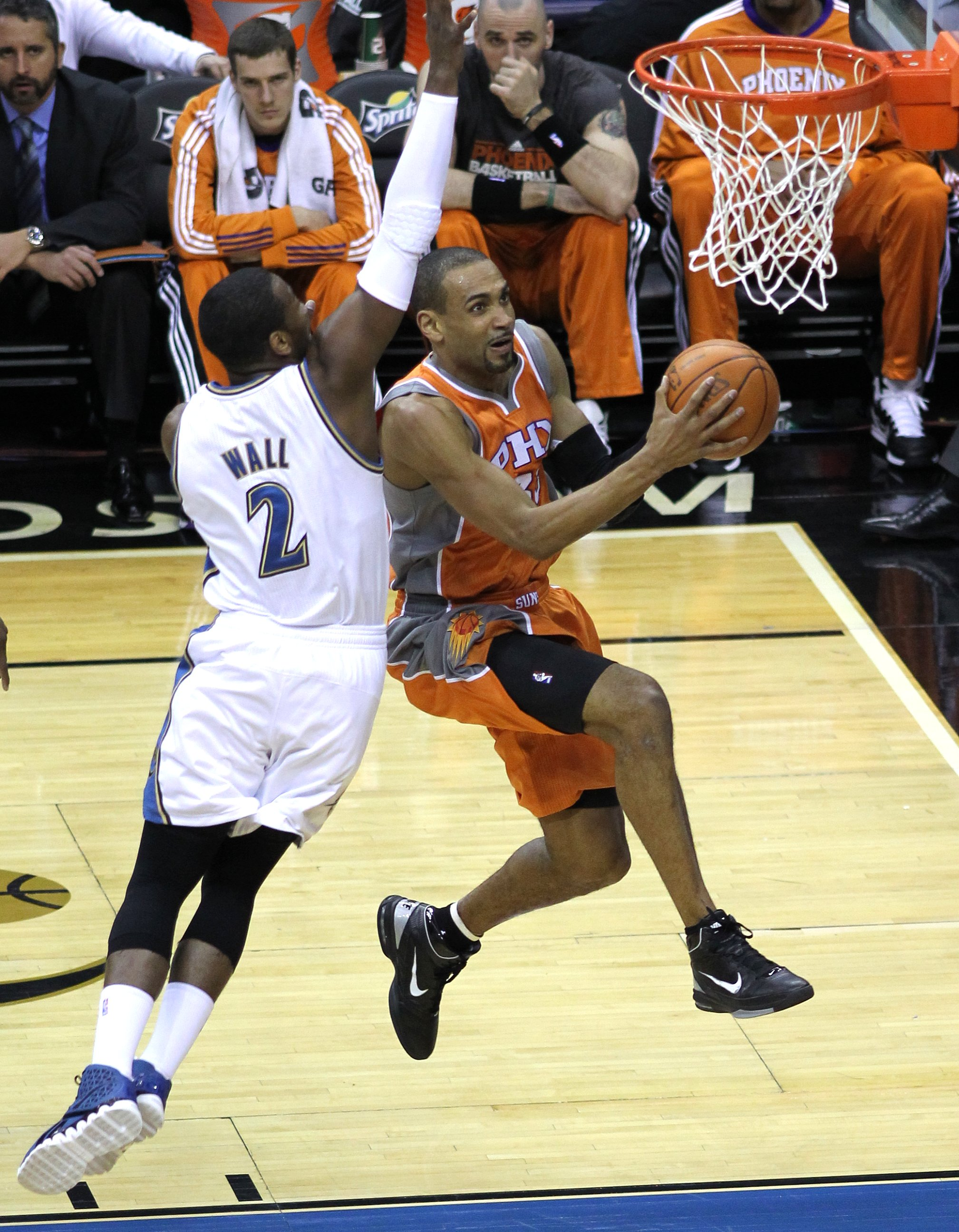
Hill with the Phoenix Suns in 2011

Hill became an unrestricted free agent on July 1, 2007. On July 5 Hill's agent, Lon Babby, said Hill intended to sign with the Phoenix Suns on July 11 (the first day free agents can officially sign contracts). Hill earned $1.83 million for 2007–08 with a $1.97 million player option for the next year. Hill was named captain along with Steve Nash. Hill was permitted by Suns Ring of Honor member, Alvan Adams, to wear his familiar No. 33 with the Suns. Hill adapted well to the Suns' up-tempo style, averaging double figures in points as a key role player for Phoenix in the early months of the 2007–08 season. He played in the team's first 34 games before an emergency appendectomy on January 9, 2008, sidelined him for two weeks. Despite being bothered by multiple injuries throughout the season, Hill had his first 70-game season since leaving Detroit, averaging 13.1 ppg, 5.0 rpg, and 2.9 apg in the process.

Playing for the Phoenix Suns in the 2008–2009 season, Hill appeared in all 82 games for the first time in his career and averaged 12.0 ppg, 4.90 rpg, and 2.3 apg, scoring 27 points and 10 rebounds in the Suns' season finale.

On July 10, 2009, the Associated Press reported that Hill decided to re-sign with the Phoenix Suns for a 2-year deal, despite an offer from the New York Knicks for the full mid-level exception and the Boston Celtics offering Hill the bi-annual exception. The first year of the contract is believed to be worth around $3 million with the second year at Hill's option.

In 2010, the Phoenix Suns advanced to the Western Conference Semifinals, marking Hill's first playoff series victory, and making him the first NBA player in history to win his first playoff series after 15 years in the league. After sweeping the San Antonio Spurs 4–0, the Suns then moved to the Western Conference Finals to face the Los Angeles Lakers, but lost in six games (4–2).

In 2010, he was chosen as the tenth-smartest athlete in sports by Sporting News.

On June 8 Hill exercised his option for the 2010–11 season. The Suns underwent two major roster changes in 2010–11. During the pre-season teammate Amar'e Stoudemire left for New York while Hedo Türkoğlu, Josh Childress and Hakim Warrick joined the Suns; within a year they also were traded for three other players. Hill became one of seven all-time NBA players to average 13 or more points at 38 years of age or older. On January 15, 2011, Hill passed the 16,000 career points milestone in a win over the Portland Trail Blazers.

On December 9, 2011, Hill decided to stay with the Phoenix Suns for one year, accepting a $6.5 million contract. By the end of the 2011–12 season, Hill had reached 17,000 career points, ending the season 78th on the all-time NBA scoring list (82nd NBA/ABA), 79th in career assists (83rd), and 66th in career steals (71st).

=== Los Angeles Clippers (2012–2013) ===
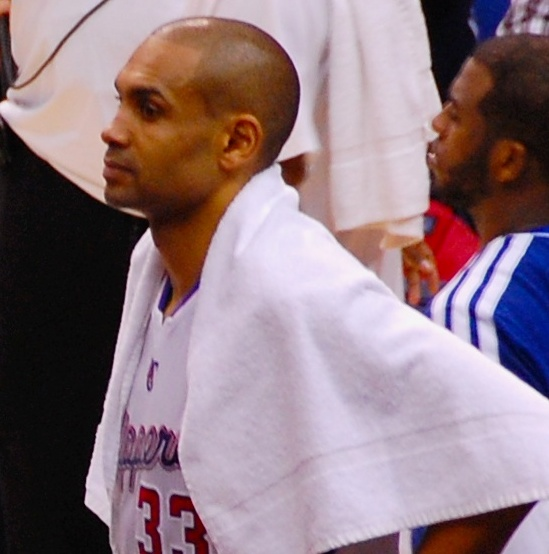
Hill with the Clippers in 2013

After his contract with the Suns expired, Hill was pursued by multiple contenders, including the Los Angeles Lakers, Miami Heat, New York Knicks, Portland Trail Blazers, and the Oklahoma City Thunder. On July 18, 2012, Hill signed a contract with the Clippers. Hill suffered a bruised bone in his right knee in the preseason which kept him out for three months. He then made his debut with the Clippers on January 12, 2013, against the Orlando Magic. During the 2012–13 season, he played only 29 games, averaging 3.2 ppg and 1.7 rpg in 15.1 mpg. The Clippers finished 56–26, fourth-best in the Western Conference, and won the Pacific Division for the first time in franchise history. However, the Clippers fell to the Memphis Grizzlies in a six-game series in the first round.

=== Retirement ===
On June 1, 2013, Hill announced his retirement from professional basketball after 19 seasons in the NBA.

On September 7, 2018, Hill was inducted into the Naismith Basketball Hall of Fame.

== Executive career ==
On June 24, 2015, a deal was approved by the NBA Board of Governors to sell the Atlanta Hawks franchise for $850 million to a group led by Tony Ressler. Hill was a member of that group, and he thus became a co-owner of the team.

On April 3, 2021, USA Basketball named Hill as the 2021–24 managing director of the USA Men's National Team. Hill succeeded Jerry Colangelo as managing director after the Tokyo Olympics.

In January 2024, John P. Angelos reached a $1.725 billion deal to sell the Baltimore Orioles to a group led by David Rubenstein. The group included Hill, former Baltimore Mayor Kurt Schmoke, Cal Ripken, New York investment manager Michael Arougheti and businessman Michael Bloomberg.

In October 2023, Hill and his wife, Tamia, became limited partners of Major League Soccer's Orlando City SC and the National Women's Soccer League's Orlando Pride.

== Broadcasting career ==
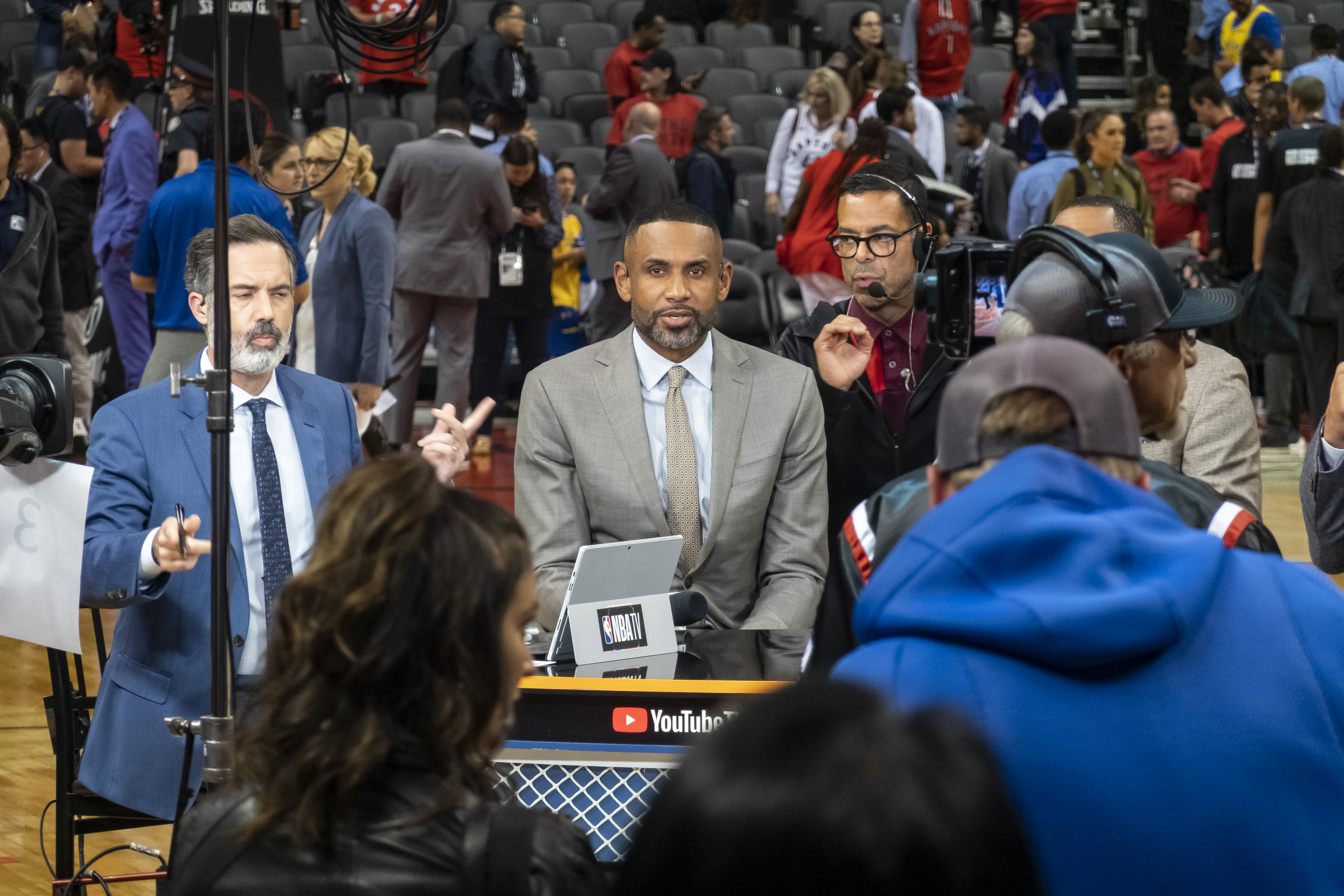
Hill covering Game 2 of the 2019 NBA Finals

Beginning in 2013, Hill has hosted NBA Inside Stuff on NBA TV. He is also a sports broadcaster for CBS. In 2015, Hill was named to the lead announcing team for CBS and Turner Sports' joint coverage of the NCAA men's basketball tournament, alongside March Madness stalwarts Jim Nantz and Bill Raftery. Hill also works as an NBA analyst on TNT.

Following their loss of NBA rights, Hill signed a long-term extension with TNT Sports to be a part of their expanded college basketball coverage. In this role, Hill will continue as the co-lead analyst for the NCAA tournament, while also calling select games from the Big East and the Big 12.

Hill joined NBC for NBA after the playoffs as game analyst while his colleague Reggie Miller was previously added to lead game analyst.

== Sponsorships and paid endorsements ==
- In the 1990s, one of the soft drink Sprite's longest-running advertising campaigns was "Grant Hill Drinks Sprite" (overlapping its "Obey Your Thirst" campaign), in which Hill's abilities, and Sprite's importance in giving him his abilities, were humorously exaggerated.
- Hill was a spokesperson for McDonald's restaurant, watchmaker TAG Heuer and sportswear companies Fila, and later Adidas and Nike.
- In 2014, Hill also appeared in ads for AT&T and Microsoft, along with his wife Tamia.

== In television and film ==
- In 1995, Hill appeared in an episode of the FOX sitcom Living Single. In the episode, Hill (portraying himself) has a whirlwind romance with magazine owner/publisher Khadijah James (Queen Latifah).
- In 1998, he was in an episode of Home Improvement on the show inside a show Tool Time.
- Hill is featured in the video of the song "Rockstar" by Nickelback.
- Hill presented an award at the 1995 MTV Video Music Awards with talk show host Ricki Lake.
- The March 13, 2011, airing of the ESPN films 30 for 30 documentary The Fab Five sparked controversy due to Jalen Rose referring to Hill and other black Duke basketball players as "Uncle Toms", leading up to a series of media exchanges between members of the press and NCAA players in forums such as The New York Times, The Wall Street Journal and The Washington Post.
- Hill is an Executive Producer for A Most Beautiful Thing (2020), documentary film chronicling the history of the first US African American public high school rowing team, composed of young men from the West Side of Chicago, many of whom were in rival gangs. The film is narrated by Common, directed by filmmaker and Olympic rower Mary Mazzio, and produced by NBA athletes Grant Hill and Dwyane Wade along with 9th Wonder who also did the hip-hop score for the film. Fifty percent of the film's profits will be donated to support inclusion efforts within the sport of rowing as well as trauma research and social justice initiatives with the NAACP.[2]
- Hill was featured in Apple Pie (2002), which was broadcast on ESPN, chronicles extraordinary athletes and their mothers, including Drew Bledsoe, Mia Hamm, Shaquille O'Neal, Grant Hill, Kenny Lofton, and others. The film was called "illuminating... told with deftness and emotion...priceless" by The New York Times

== Personal life and family ==
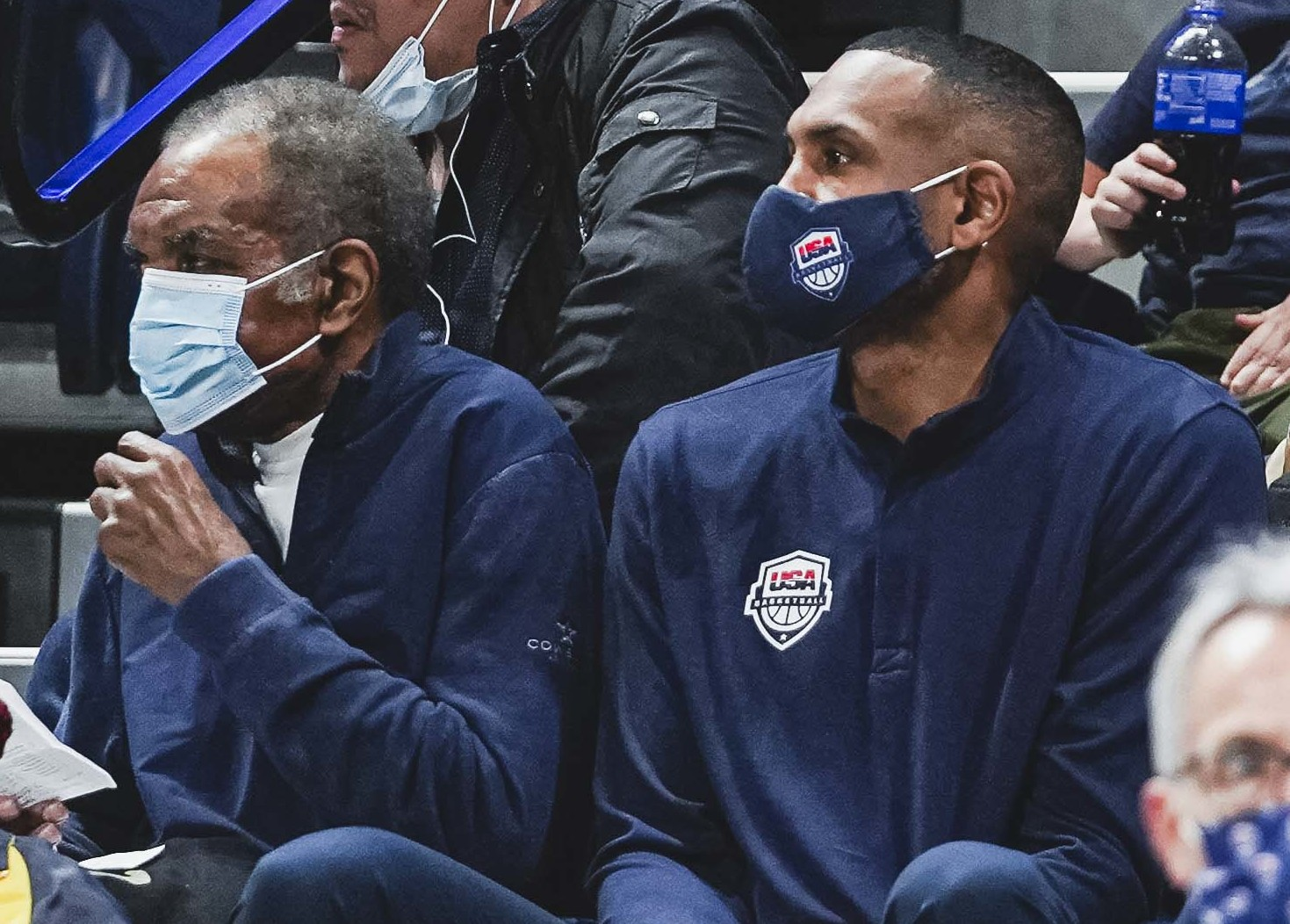
Hill (right) with his father, Calvin, in 2022

Hill is the son of former NFL football player Calvin Hill and his wife, Janet, a math teacher-turned business executive and consultant. He was born in Dallas, Texas and raised in Virginia. He dated actress Jada Pinkett Smith from 1993 to 1995.

In Detroit, Michigan, in 1996, Hill was introduced to Canadian singer Tamia by Anita Baker. Hill and Tamia married on July 24, 1999. They have two daughters, Myla Grace Hill, born on January 23, 2002, and Lael Rose Hill, born on August 9, 2007. The family resides in Windermere, Florida.

In 1999, Hill received the Golden Plate Award of the American Academy of Achievement.

After he contracted a life-threatening methicillin-resistant Staphylococcus aureus (MRSA) infection in 2003, Hill became an advocate for the awareness and prevention of MRSA and has appeared in public service announcements for Stop MRSA Now!, a non-profit organization.

Hill earned his bachelor's degree from Duke University with a double major in history and political science.

=== Charitable activities ===
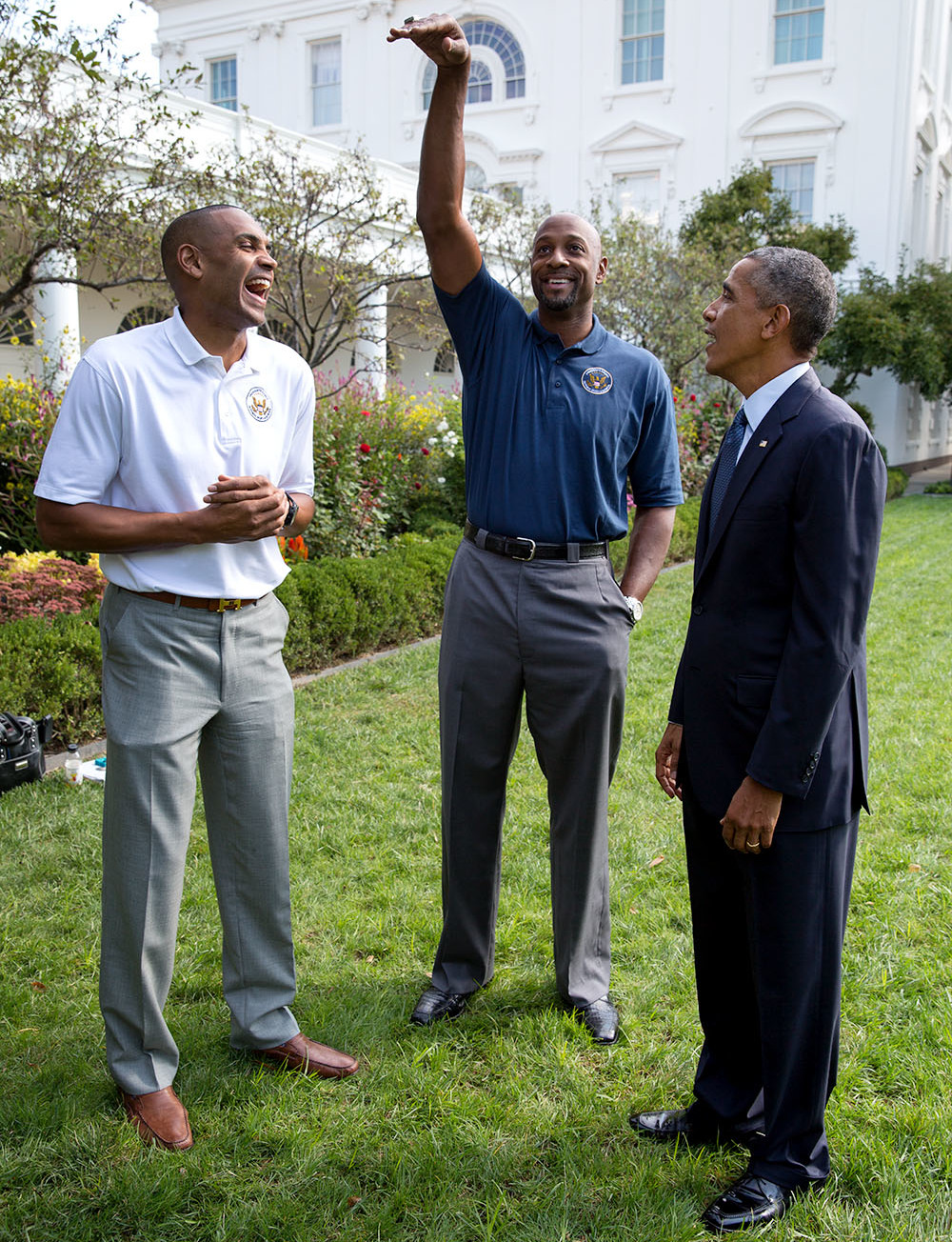
Hill (left) with Alonzo Mourning (center) and President Barack Obama in the White House Rose Garden in 2014

Hill had been a Vice-Chairman for the Board of Directors of the Special Olympic World Summer Games in 1999 which were held in Durham, Raleigh and Chapel Hill, North Carolina.

Grant Hill, his mother Janet Hill and grandmother Vivian McDonald established a scholarship at the Dillard University in New Orleans. This scholarship is in memory of Hill's grandfather, who supported the university consistently.

Hill was featured on a poster "READ" that supported libraries, literacy, and advocated reading.

Hill donated funds to the day care center established by his father Calvin in New Haven, Connecticut in 1972. The daycare center was established after Calvin graduated from Yale University and the goal was helping children and families in the local community.

Hill funded an organization in his hometown of Reston, Virginia, that helps needy students of any age pursue education.

=== Other interests ===
Hill owns a substantial collection of African-American art, centering on the work of Romare Bearden and Elizabeth Catlett. A selection of 46 works from the collection was featured in a touring exhibition at several American museums from 2003 to 2006. The exhibition was last shown at the Nasher Museum of Art at Hill's alma mater, Duke University.

Hill has established ties with the Democratic Party. On the night Hill was drafted in the NBA, he received a congratulatory phone call from U.S. President Bill Clinton. Hill publicly supported John Kerry's 2004 presidential campaign and Barack Obama's 2008 and 2012 presidential bids.

== NBA career statistics ==
Legend
GP	Games played	GS	Games started	MPG	Minutes per game
FG%	Field goal percentage	3P%	3-point field goal percentage	FT%	Free throw percentage
RPG	Rebounds per game	APG	Assists per game	SPG	Steals per game
BPG	Blocks per game	PPG	Points per game	**Bold**	Career high
*	Led the league

=== Regular season ===
Year	Team	GP	GS	MPG	FG%	3P%	FT%	RPG	APG	SPG	BPG	PPG
1994–95	Detroit	70	69	38.3	.477	.148	.732	6.4	5.0	**1.8**	**.9**	19.9
1995–96	Detroit	80	80	**40.8**	.462	.192	.751	**9.8**	6.9	1.3	.6	20.2
1996–97	Detroit	80	80	39.3	.496	.303	.711	9.0	**7.3**	**1.8**	.6	21.4
1997–98	Detroit	81	**81**	40.7	.452	.143	.740	7.7	6.8	**1.8**	.7	21.1
1998–99	Detroit	50*	50*	37.0	.479	.000	.752	7.1	6.0	1.6	.5	21.1
1999–00	Detroit	74	74	37.5	.489	.347	.795	6.6	5.2	1.4	.6	**25.8**
2000–01	Orlando	4	4	33.3	.442	**1.000**	.615	6.3	6.3	1.3	.5	13.8
2001–02	Orlando	14	14	36.6	.426	.000	.863	8.9	4.6	.6	.3	16.8
2002–03	Orlando	29	29	29.1	.492	.250	.819	7.1	4.2	1.0	.4	14.5
2004–05	Orlando	67	67	34.9	.509	.231	.821	4.7	3.3	1.4	.4	19.7
2005–06	Orlando	21	17	29.2	.490	.250	.765	3.8	2.3	1.1	.3	15.1
2006–07	Orlando	65	64	30.9	.518	.167	.765	3.6	2.1	.9	.4	14.4
2007–08	Phoenix	70	68	31.7	.503	.317	**.867**	5.0	2.9	.9	.8	13.1
2008–09	Phoenix	**82***	68	29.8	**.523**	.316	.808	4.9	2.3	1.1	.7	12.0
2009–10	Phoenix	81	**81**	30.0	.478	.438	.817	5.5	2.4	.7	.4	11.3
2010–11	Phoenix	80	80	30.1	.484	.395	.829	4.2	2.5	.8	.4	13.2
2011–12	Phoenix	49	46	28.1	.446	.264	.761	3.5	2.2	.8	.6	10.2
2012–13	L.A. Clippers	29	0	15.1	.388	.273	.583	1.7	.9	.4	.2	3.2
Career		1026	972	33.9	.483	.314	.769	6.0	4.1	1.2	.6	16.7
All-Star		6	6	22.2	.571	.500	.545	2.5	3.2	1.2	.2	10.5

=== Playoffs ===
Year	Team	GP	GS	MPG	FG%	3P%	FT%	RPG	APG	SPG	BPG	PPG
1996	Detroit	3	3	38.3	**.564**	**.500**	.857	**7.3**	3.7	1.0	.0	19.0
1997	Detroit	5	5	**40.6**	.437	.000	.718	6.8	5.4	.8	**1.0**	**23.6**
1999	Detroit	5	5	35.2	.457	.000	.813	7.2	**7.4**	**2.0**	.4	19.4
2000	Detroit	2	2	27.5	.375	**.500**	.900	5.5	4.5	.5	.0	11.0
2007	Orlando	4	4	35.8	.500	.000	.667	5.5	3.8	.5	.3	15.0
2008	Phoenix	3	2	22.7	.455	.000	**1.000**	5.3	1.0	.7	.3	3.7
2010	Phoenix	**16**	**16**	28.3	.480	.188	.868	5.8	2.3	.8	.6	9.6
2013	L.A. Clippers	1	0	20.0	.500	.000	.000	4.0	2.0	.0	.0	4.0
Career		39	37	31.6	.469	.238	.781	6.1	3.6	.9	.5	13.4

== See also ==
- List of oldest and youngest NBA players
- List of NBA career triple-double leaders
