= Children of the Night (1985 film) =

1985 American made-for-television film

- Genre: Drama
- Based on: Life of Lois Lee
- Teleplay by: Vickie Patik; Robert Guenette
- Story by: William Wood
- Directed by: Robert Markowitz
- Starring: See below
- Music by: Miles Goodman
- Country of origin: United States
- Original language: English

Production
- Executive producer: Robert Guenette
- Producer: Conrad Holzgang
- Cinematography: Gil Hubbs
- Editor: Peter Parasheles
- Running time: 93 minutes
- Production company: Robert Guenette Productions

Original release
- Network: CBS
- Release: October 26, 1985

Children of the Night is a 1985 American made-for-television drama film directed by Robert Markowitz. The film is a fictionalized biopic of Dr. Lois Lee, following her work among young prostitutes in Hollywood and the organization Children of the Night that she founded as a result.

== Plot ==
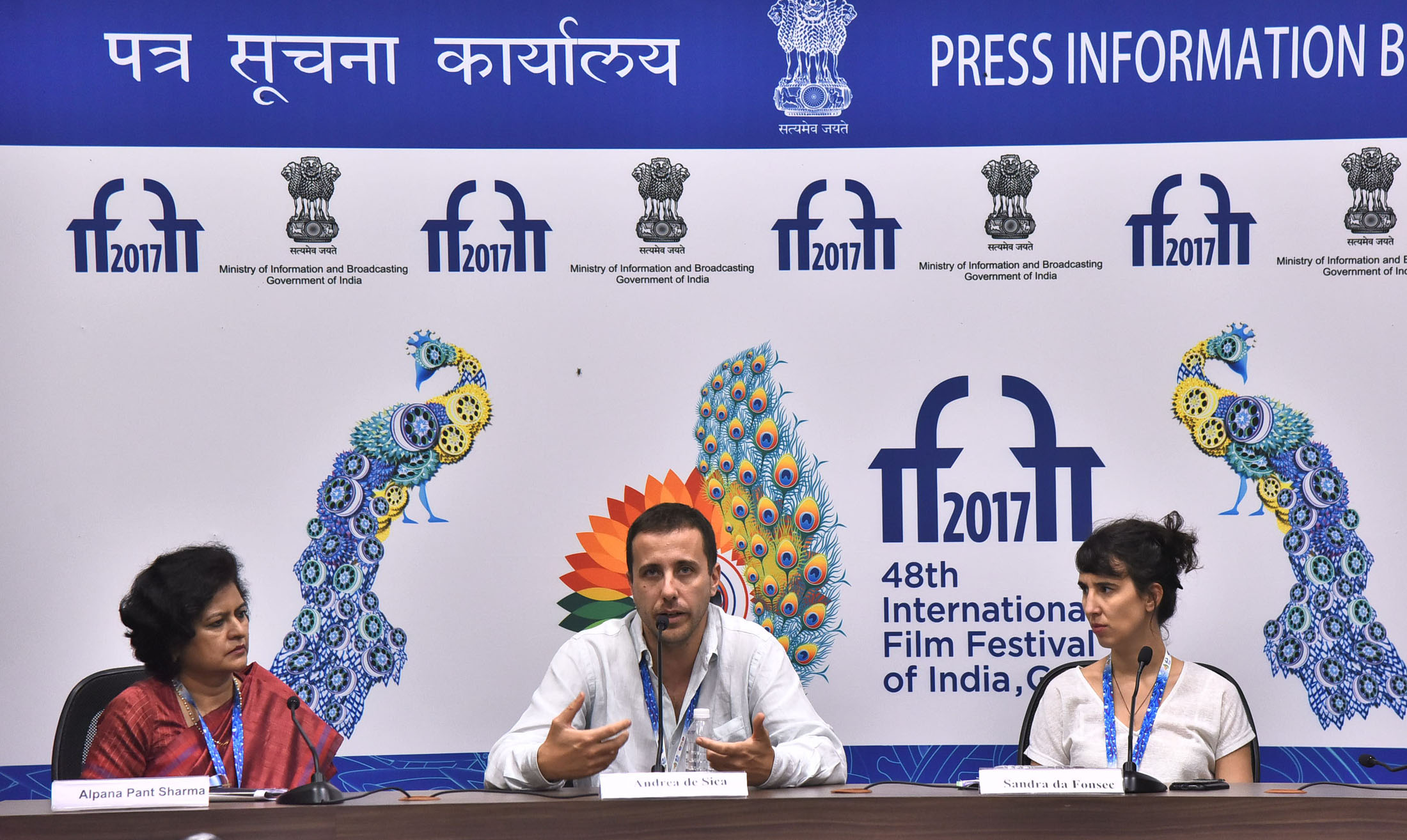
Film crew at IFFI (2016)

== Cast ==
- Kathleen Quinlan as Lois Lee
- Nicholas Campbell as Larry
- Mario Van Peebles as Roy Spanish
- Lar Park Lincoln as Valerie
- Wallace Langham as Kevin
- Eddie Velez as Tom
- David L. Crowley as Marty
- Donald Hotton as Dr. Norris
- Marta Kober as Linda
- Laura Esterman as Arlene
- Sherri Stone as Brandy
- Michael Shaner as Jerry
- Vincent J. Isaac as "Jink"
- Michelle Ann Martin as Ginger
- Monica Calhoun as Wanda
- Zoe Trilling as Melody
- Helene Udy as Dallas
- Valerie Richards as Zoe
- George Spaventa as Robert Ringen

== Soundtrack ==
- Pat Benatar - "Hell is for Children"
