= Lois Lee =

American nonprofit executive

Lois Lee is the founder of Children of the Night, a non-profit organization that works to support youth who were involved in prostitution, based in Van Nuys, California. The organization was depicted in a movie by the same name. She received the President's Volunteer Action Award from President Ronald Reagan in 1984.

On November 18, 2010, Lee presented Playboy founder, Hugh M. Hefner, with Children of the Night's first "Founder's Hero of the Hearts Award" for his support of her organization.
