= Child of the Light =

Novel by Janet Berliner and George Guthridge

Child of the Light is a novel by Janet Berliner and George Guthridge published by White Wolf in 1991.

== Plot summary ==
Child of the Light is a novel which takes place in Berlin between World War I and World War II, and involves the love held between three children: the Jewish boy Sol who is tormented by visions of a terrifying future; his egotistical friend Erich who can only speak with dogs; and the Jewish girl Miriam who is in love with both.

== Reception ==
Gideon Kibblewhite reviewed Child of the Light for Arcane magazine, rating it a 4 out of 10 overall. Kibblewhite comments that "It's a wonder that Sol and Miriam love [Erich] at all. But that's the book's major theme, really: love knows no bounds. Its great strength is the way it uses an unusual story to explore a period of history that has already received much literary attention."

Kirkus Reviews states "Beautifully done, with a dour Jewish humor, but the raison d`etre is a bit obscure. Perhaps the second novel, featuring a battle between Jews and Nazis, will clear things up."

== Reviews ==
- Review by Gary K. Wolfe (1992) in Locus, #375 April 1992
- Review by Orson Scott Card (1993) in The Magazine of Fantasy & Science Fiction, January 1993
- Review by Paul Di Filippo (1996) in Asimov's Science Fiction, October–November 1996
