= Jim Larkin (publisher) =

Arizona journalist and publisher (1949–2023)

James "Jim" Anthony Larkin
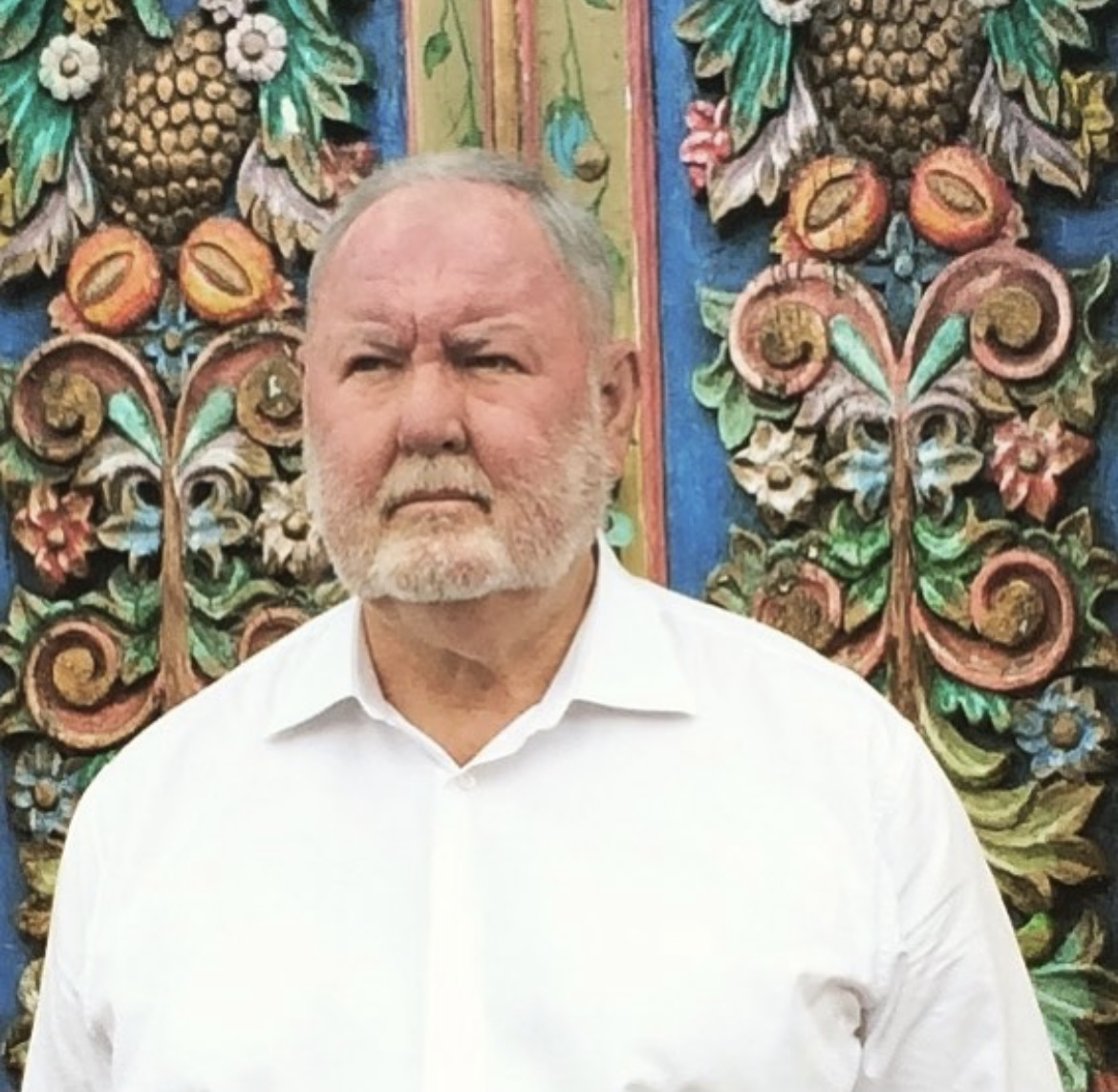
- Born: June 16, 1949; Omaha, Nebraska, U.S.
- Died: July 31, 2023 (aged 74); Superior, Arizona, U.S.
- Occupation: Publisher/Journalist
- Known for: Chairman/CEO of Village Voice Media (VVM)

James Anthony Larkin (June 16, 1949 – July 31, 2023) was an American publisher and journalist in Phoenix, Arizona, known for his influence in the alternative newspaper industry. He was largely responsible, along with business partner Michael Lacey, for his work with the Phoenix New Times, also known as New Times Inc.

With Larkin in charge of the business side and Lacey in charge of editorial, the two men expanded what had been a small, college-based publication into an industry giant to the value of $400 million.

Lacey and Larkin sold VVM in 2012 to long-time company executives, and the company was renamed Voice Media Group (VMG). Lacey and Larkin retained control of the classified ad site Backpage, which they co-founded in 2004 with ad exec Carl Ferrer as a competitor to Craigslist. Ferrer purchased Backpage in 2015 from Lacey and Larkin in a seller-financed deal. By that time, Backpage was under constant fire from state Attorneys General and various NGOs for listings appearing in its adult ad section. Critics accused Backpage of promoting prostitution and sex trafficking through its "adult" section, though the ads in the section had been found by several federal and state courts to be protected by Section 230 of the Communications Decency Act of 1996 and the First Amendment.

Backpage closed its adult ad section in January 2017 on the eve of a federal hearing into its practices. The U.S. Department of Justice later convened a federal grand jury to investigate the company and in April 2018, the FBI arrested Larkin, Lacey and several others on charges of facilitating prostitution, money laundering, and conspiracy, with Ferrer turning state's evidence and promising to testify against his former employers in exchange for leniency.

Larkin, Lacey, and four others pleaded not guilty to all charges in the indictment—100 total, with each defendant being charged with different counts. The FBI also seized Backpage, removing it permanently from the internet. The trial for Larkin and his co-defendants began September 1, 2021, in federal court in Phoenix before U.S. District Court Judge Susan Brnovich, an appointee of President Donald Trump and the wife of Backpage critic, Arizona Attorney General Mark Brnovich, a Republican who ran to unseat Democratic U.S. Senator Mark Kelly in 2022.

On September 14, Brnovich granted a defense motion for mistrial, "after deciding prosecutors had too many references to child sex trafficking in a case where no one faced such a charge," according to the Associated Press. Brnovich said she had given prosecutors "leeway" to discuss sex trafficking as long as they did not linger on the details, but the government "abused that leeway."

Brnovich scheduled a new trial for February 2022. She recused herself without explanation in October 2021 and was replaced by federal Judge Diane Humetewa, a long-time ally of former U.S. Sen. John McCain. Lacey and Larkin claimed that McCain and his wife Cindy had driven the federal prosecution, saying it was payback for the days when their papers criticized McCain.

In December, Humetewa denied a defense motion to dismiss the case for double jeopardy, and a new trial was placed on hold while the defendants appealed her ruling to the Ninth Circuit Court of Appeals.

On September 21, 2022, a three-judge panel of the Ninth Circuit Court of Appeals denied the defendants' request that the court reverses Humetewa and dismiss the case because a new trial would violate the U.S. Constitution's prohibition on Double Jeopardy. The panel wrote that "the government’s misconduct" during the trial "was not so egregious as to compel a finding" that prosecutors intended to provoke a mistrial, the legal standard for dismissal in this instance. A new trial was scheduled for August 8, 2023, but Larkin committed suicide on July 31, at the age of 74. Judge Humetewa rescheduled the trial for August 29.

== Early life and career ==
Raised in Phoenix, Arizona in what he once referred to as a "Catholic ghetto," Larkin attended St. Agnes grade school in Phoenix, then Gerard Catholic High School, where he reportedly co-founded a student newspaper, The Big Press, which criticized the school's administration, resulting in a brief suspension. He played football during his two-year stint at Phoenix Union College, then attended college in Mexico City, Mexico, where he was influenced by student protests against the Mexican government. (Larkin's mother died in 1951 before he turned two.)

After returning to Phoenix, he encountered the fledgling New Times weekly, first named the Arizona Times. It had been founded in 1970 by recent Arizona State University (ASU) dropout Michael Lacey and various other ASU students in opposition to the U.S. conflict in Vietnam, specifically the Nixon administration's incursion into Cambodia and the massacre of four students at Kent State University in Ohio, shot down by National Guard troops as the students protested President Richard Nixon's illegal expansion of the war.

As Lacey later recalled, in 1972, Larkin wrote "a long letter to New Times analyzing the local media and political scene," after which, the two men met and clicked, with Lacey saying that Larkin would eventually "grow into the single most important reason for [the paper's] later success".

In the spirit of the times, the paper was organized as a collective, which one writer described in later years as "more Maoist rag than H.L. Mencken chronicle." Unlike the other young hippie radicals dedicating themselves to the paper, Larkin was married with two children. "After working a full day at the paper," Lacey said, "[Larkin] then [drove] to Nantucket Lobster Trap, where he worked all night as a waiter. His perspective was decidedly practical as he worked alongside a staff of dreamers."

Meanwhile, Lacey, who had grown up in Newark, New Jersey, was giving blood, then plasma, to keep the paper going.

For the paper's 20th Anniversary edition in 1990, Larkin described that because the paper was a collective "anyone who had written ANYTHING for the paper -- a couple of record reviews even -- would have as much voice as I did, even though I was working there full time and it was my bread and butter." Larkin also noted that New Times survived "because there were so many people willing to work for nothing or next to nothing because . . . they thought they were part of a great social experiment".

Despite notable journalistic achievements in the paper's early years—such as exposing Arizona Sen. Paul Fannin's DUI coverup and illegal contributions by car dealers to Rep. John Conlan's Senate campaign—burnout was high, in part due to the paper's expansion into Tucson and a gruelling-though-successful fundraising effort to sell 35,000 shares of $1 stock, money that quickly dissipated. Larkin was named publisher and president of the company in 1974, but there was an exodus of personnel, including Lacey that year, and Larkin in 1975.

New ownership and management increasingly thought of the paper as a college publication centred around ASU, but in March 1977, Lacey and Larkin rendezvoused in Mexico and plotted a stockholder revolt, referred to by insiders as "the Coup," that placed them both back in control of the company, with Larkin as publisher and Lacey as executive editor. The paper's headquarters moved physically and symbolically from downtown Tempe to Phoenix's Westward Ho hotel. And the reborn weekly almost immediately enjoyed an unforeseen stroke of good fortune: A group of journalists calling themselves the Investigative Reporters and Editors (IRE) had descended on Arizona in the wake of the 1976 car-bombing of Arizona Republic reporter Don Bolles, producing the Arizona Report, a 23-part investigation into the corruption and organized crime that led to Bolles' killing. Though the Republic had reporters assigned to the IRE project, the establishment daily refused to publish the results, claiming the report fell short of journalistic standards. With Lacey not yet in Phoenix, Larkin and then-editor Geoff O'Connell decided to run the IRE report, giving their struggling paper an exclusive, routing the Republic on its own turf.

Lacey and Larkin renamed the paper Phoenix New Times (PNT) that same year. Ten years later, in 1987, they took the company private, with an $800,000 loan from Western Savings and Loan president Gary Driggs to buy out the remaining shareholders.

== Newspaper business ==
As Larkin told Phoenix Magazine in 1990, he was determined to be involved in the newspaper industry from a young age "because I knew it would be fun" and because "it had a power that was exponentially greater than it should have . . . that attracted me. And I knew that when I was 15 years old. I just knew it." The New Times editorial formula combined long-form, magazine-style, investigative and enterprise journalism with cultural criticism and food and music reporting. And Larkin "had a plan for a mass-marketed free paper that would attract the readership numbers needed for influence and ad dollars".

Paid advertising, especially affordable classified ads and personals, made the free paper profitable and able to afford full-time writing staff. Product placement was important, with circulation commanded by a Larkin-hire, former record store owner Scott Spear, who "placed the free paper in racks at suburban convenience stores and other locations such as gas stations and restaurants," and by the 1990s, circulation had increased to 140,000.

At that time, an estimated 81 percent of Phoenix New Times' readers were 18 to 44 and appreciated the paper's anti-authoritarian approach to the news, with Larkin saying that the paper had always tried to be "outrageous" and that outrageousness was part of the paper's marketing strategy: "We try to keep people guessing; we try to get them emotionally involved," Larkin said; sometimes this meant losing an advertising account if the paper offended powerful individuals and companies.

As with all alternative papers, legal adult advertising—from strip clubs, erotic massage, escorts, etc.—was a part of PNT's revenue stream. The same could be said for the Yellow Pages of years past. For many years, such ads were relatively uncontroversial, though that would change in the late 1990s with the rise of online classified services such as Craigslist.

Another successful source of income for PNT was its yearly "Best Of" issue, which the paper successfully copyrighted and exported to sister outlets. Popular and thick with ads, the idea has been much copied by rival publications and continues to this day.

=== Free speech battles ===
PNT was inspired by student protests against the Vietnam War, and throughout its history, the paper agitated on behalf of the First Amendment and even broader free speech rights. The first edition of the paper covered an anti-war demonstration at ASU and a simultaneous counterdemonstration by construction workers, aka, "hard hats," who took offense to the students' cause.

The paper's first major free speech fight was over advertisements for "a referral service for abortions that were performed legally in California" that ran in 1971 when abortion was illegal in Arizona. The City of Tempe took New Times, Inc. to court, and the paper was found guilty of violating a state law prohibiting such advertisements. The paper appealed, and on July 3, 1973, the Arizona Court of Appeals ruled in NTI's favor, finding that the U.S. Supreme Court's recent Roe v. Wade decision invalidated Arizona's abortion statutes.

In Tucson, the University of Arizona arbitrarily limited the distribution points for the paper and imposed a distribution fee, regulations that only affected NTI. NTI sued the Arizona Board of Regents, and in February 1974, the Arizona Supreme Court ruled against U of A and the Regents, writing that "The free publication and dissemination of books and other forms of printed matter are within the constitutionally protected freedoms of...press or speech".

Larkin once described the paper's "stubborn approach to bureaucrats telling us "you can't do that" or "we're not going to allow you to do that", adding, "We knew what our rights were to distribute opinion and news".

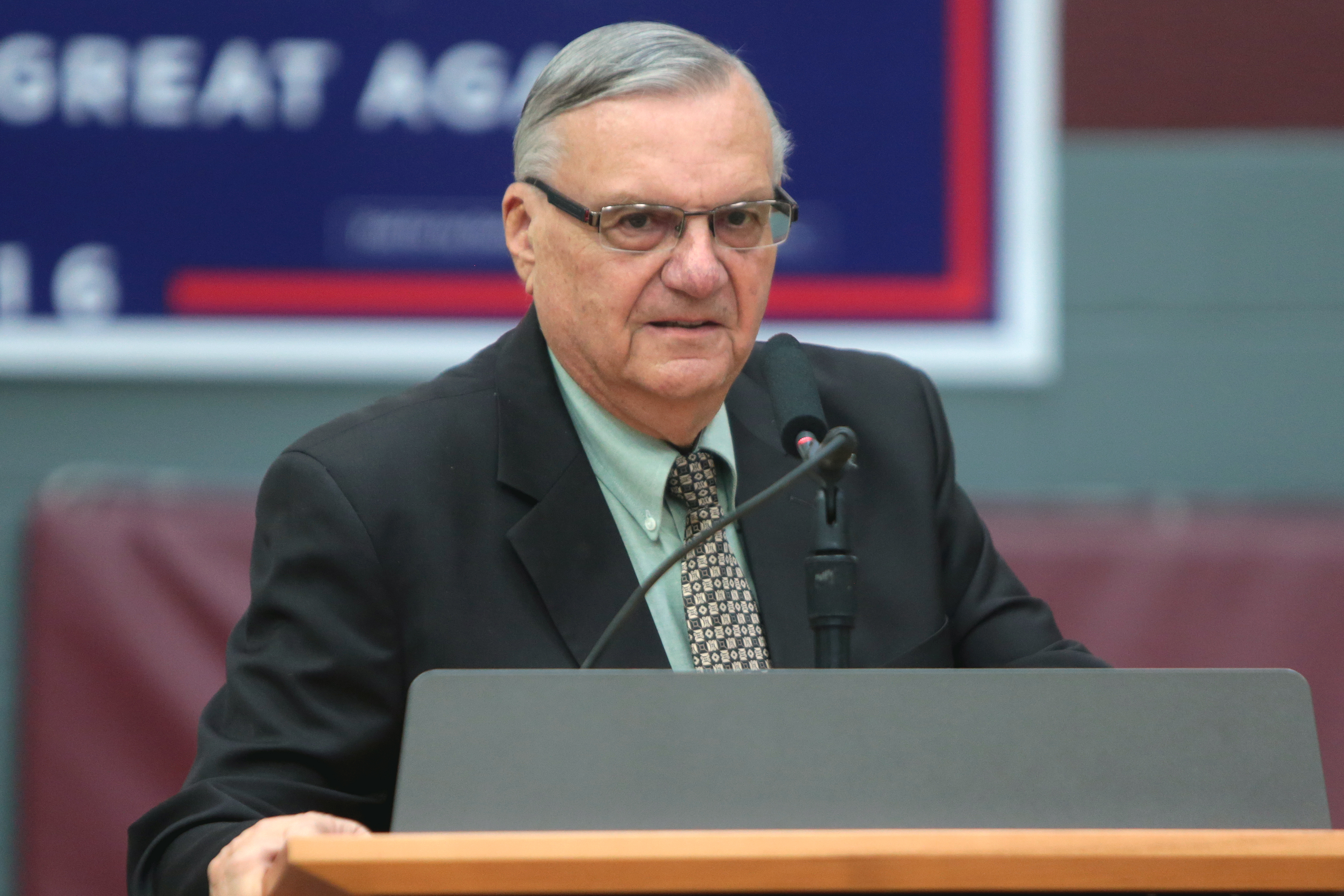
Maricopa County Sheriff Joe Arpaio, who had Lacey and Larkin arrested in 2007 after they exposed a grand jury investigating the paper

The paper's focus on police shootings and other abuses of power frequently drew the wrath of powerful law enforcement figures, including Phoenix Police Chief Ruben Ortega, Maricopa County Attorneys Rick Romley and Andrew Thomas, and Maricopa County Sheriff Joe Arpaio, among others.

In 1992, during a court hearing regarding a Maricopa County Attorney's Office (MCAO) sting meant to collar corrupt politicians called AzScam, it was revealed that AzScam's undercover investigator, Joe Stedino, had been ordered to investigate Lacey for alleged "illegal cocaine activity," though this was unrelated to AzScam's corruption probe. There was no basis for the investigation of Lacey and Stedino's efforts revealed nothing. Lacey wrote that he believed County Attorney Romley's reason for targeting him had to do with an investigative series Lacey had done on Club 902, a notorious skid row bar in which Romley had a financial interest.

Similarly, in 1993, the head of the Arizona Department of Public Safety, Col. Ralph Milstead, a friend of Ortega's from their days as patrol cops, told Phoenix New Times that Ortega had convinced Milstead to investigate PNT executive editor Mike Lacey in the 1980s for alleged cocaine smuggling, though there was no probable cause to do so. Predictably, the investigation uncovered no evidence of wrongdoing. Ortega was the frequent target of PNT exposés.

Larkin and Lacey's most storied First Amendment battle was with Sheriff Arpaio, whom the paper had covered extensively since he was first elected in 1992 to be the top lawman of the state's most populous county. The Phoenix New Times exposed the cruelty of Arpaio's jails, a cruelty that resulted in numerous high-profile deaths and multi-million-dollar lawsuit payouts. They looked into the misuses of Arpaio's posse, the sheriff's abuses of power and his misspending of public funds.

In 2004, Arpaio spied an opportunity for revenge when PNT reporter John Dougherty reported on the hundreds of thousands of dollars that Arpaio had wrapped up in the real-estate, asking how Arpaio got the money for these investments on a civil servant's salary and why the addresses of most had been redacted by the county. The one address not redacted was Arpaio's home address, and PNT published it. Though Arpaio's address was available all over the internet in election filings and other official sources, Arpaio wanted Dougherty prosecuted for an obscure, never-used law that made it illegal to publish a law enforcement officer's address on the internet. (Note: It was not illegal to publish it in print.)

In 2007, Arpaio's political ally, County Attorney Andrew Thomas, appointed a special prosecutor to investigate the supposed violation, Phoenix attorney Dennis Wilenchik, who issued broad grand jury subpoenas seeking detailed information on anyone who had visited the PNT website since 2004, in addition to any and all documents related to stories written about Arpaio by three PNT reporters. When Wilenchik allegedly sought to have an ex parte meeting with the judge in the case, both Larkin and Lacey authored a double-bylined October 18, 2007, cover story for PNT revealing the existence of the grand jury subpoenas, a misdemeanor under state law.

That evening, both Lacey and Larkin were arrested by plainclothes detectives driving unmarked cars with Mexican license plates. Both were released hours later, and by morning there was a near-universal condemnation of the nighttime arrests, forcing Thomas to drop the entire matter. Lacey and Larkin sued Arpaio and Maricopa County for false arrest. The county settled in 2013 for $3.75 million, and Larkin and Lacey used the award to set up the Frontera Fund, a non-profit fund that distributed the money to Latino and pro-immigrant organizations.

The Arizona office of the American Civil Liberties Union honored both Lacey and Larkin in May 2008 with its Civil Libertarian of the Year Award, "the ACLU's highest honor bestowed annually to individuals who make outstanding contributions to the advancement of civil liberties".

=== Acquisitions/expansion, 1983-2005 ===
The Phoenix New Times was an early and sustained success. Beginning in 1983, Lacey and Larkin bought multiple other alternative newspapers, and by 2000 they owned eleven. In 2005 they bought The Village Voice and five others, merging with Village Voice Media to create a 17-paper chain, but over time, Lacey and Larkin either acquired or began 21 publications in all. As Larkin told The New York Times in 1996: "We take money from our profitable papers and buy losing papers".

The following are PNT's major acquisitions from 1983 to 2005:

- Westword, 1983: Denver, Colorado's Westword became New Times, Inc.'s first purchase in 1983, when Lacey and Larkin bought the paper from founding editor Patty Calhoun and her partners for almost $68,000. Calhoun remains editor to this day. The purchase was finalized not long after Colorado's "shale oil bust," and it took several years before Westword (and the state) rebounded economically. By 1990, circulation was more than 100,000 and revenue was "close to $4 million".
- Miami New Times, 1987: For its third paper, NTI went east and for less than $100,000 purchased The Wave, a Miami alt-weekly that they quickly renamed Miami New Times, investing $1.4 million into the paper, making it "the fastest growing weekly in the country" in 1990.
- Dallas Observer, 1991: Lacey and Larkin bought the 11-year-old tabloid for around $3 million, and the deal benefited from the closing that year of the Dallas Times Herald, one of two major dailies in the city.
- Houston Press, 1993: Now named New Times Media (NTM), Lacey and Larkin's fledgling alt-weekly empire gobbled up the Houston Press, founded in 1989, for $2.75 million. At its height in 1999, the Press employed 23 editors and writers with an average of 152 pages per week.
- Ruxton Group, 1995: Established by the Chicago Reader's parent company in 1984 as a national advertising concern representing alternative weeklies. NTM bought the company in 1995, and the firm expanded along with NTM, later serving Village Voice Media and its successor corporation, Voice Media Group.
- SF Weekly, 1995: Lacey and Larkin entered into one of the biggest newspaper battles of their lives when they bought the SF Weekly in 1995 for an undisclosed amount. The purchase sparked an old-fashioned newspaper war, with the SF Weekly going head-to-head with the city's other alternative tabloid, the San Francisco Bay Guardian, helmed by editor/publisher Bruce B. Brugman. Brugman called Lacey and Larkin "desert libertarians" and accused them of being purveyors of "cookie cutter" journalism, while the SF Weekly retaliated by putting an illustration of Brugman's head on a stick on advertisements that ran on city buses. Brugman sued, claiming that the Weekly intended to put the Bay Guardian out of business by undercutting it on ad prices. A jury found for Brugman, who was awarded $16 million in damages. Lacey and Larkin appealed, and the matter was later settled for an undisclosed sum.
- New Times LA, 1996: In 1996, Lacey and Larkin entered the Los Angeles media market by purchasing two small weeklies, the L.A. Reader and the Los Angeles View, combining them into New Times LA, with former Los Angeles Times editor Rick Barrs joining the paper as its executive editor. The new weekly competed both with the Times and with the LA Weekly, then owned by Village Voice Media. But New Times LA never turned a profit, and it was shuttered in 2002 in a deal with VVM, in which New Times Media and VVM closed competing papers in L.A. and Cleveland, Ohio, respectively.
- New Times Broward-Palm Beach (NTBPB), 1997: New Times Media created NTBPB in 1997 after Larkin realized that the community, though physically close to Miami, had a distinct culture, audience and market ripe for what New Times billed as its "first start-up operation in 25 years".
- Cleveland Scene, 1998: Launched in 1970 as a music/entertainment publication by founder Richard Kabat, on Larkin's initiative, NTM purchased the paper in 1998 as NTM's first foray into the Midwest, and the Scene soon adapted to the company's culture by expanding its journalistic horizons into investigative journalism, much like other NTM ventures.
- Riverfront Times, 1998: In another prong of Larkin's Midwest strategy, NTM acquired St. Louis, Missouri's Riverfront Times, co-founded by publisher Ray Hartmann in 1977.
- The Pitch, 1999: The third and final Midwest acquisition for NTM was Kansas City, Missouri's Pitch Weekly, later dubbed The Pitch, which had a circulation of 100,000, bumping NTM's total combined circulation to 1.1 million.
- New Times Media/Village Voice Media merger, 2005: Both Lacey and Larkin achieved a career milestone with the NTM's acquisition of Village Voice Media, named after the legendary Village Voice, the nation's premier alternative newsweekly, co-founded by Norman Mailer in 1955 as the political and moral voice of the counterculture. The announcement of the merger, in which NTM was dominant, came during the Voice's 50th anniversary. The fact two journalistic cowboys from Phoenix were now in charge of this diadem in Gotham's journalistic crown rubbed many the wrong way, including some of the paper's devoted readers. Less than seven years later, Lacey and Larkin were forced to distance themselves from VVM over the controversy concerning the chain's classified ad site, Backpage.com.

=== Craigslist and adult advertising ===
Ultimately, the Internet devoured advertising profits, in no small part due to the rise of Craigslist, which allowed users to post most ads to its site for free. One study estimated that from 2000 to 2015, Craigslist cost the newspaper industry $5 billion in lost advertising revenue.

To staunch the bleeding, in 2004 New Times created Backpage.com, the brainstorm of then-ad exec and future Backpage CEO Carl Ferrer. Like Craigslist, Backpage featured categories where people could post ads for help, wanted, car and home sales, rooms to let, antique sales, and so on. Similar to Craigslist, Backpage also had an "adult" section where advertisers could post listings for escorts, body rubs, striptease, etc. Craigslist's adult section was initially titled "erotic services".

Backpage's name derived from the fact that classified ads generally appeared in the back of the newspaper's "book," with the literal back page of the publication being "a premium-priced ad showcase".

For decades, such ads had been a staple of alternative weeklies and could even be found in the hardcopy of the ubiquitous phone listings book, the Yellow Pages, but the proliferation of such ads online drew the scrutiny of a coalition of NGOs, ambitious politicians and state attorneys general, who claimed that the adult listings were thinly veiled prostitution ads and in some cases were connected to sex trafficking, which involves either minors or adults forced into prostitution. This coalition pressured Craigslist to vigorously scrutinize adult ads prior to publication, to report suspect ads to law enforcement, and to charge each poster a fee via a credit card, allowing the poster to be tracked electronically. Craigslist took these steps in May 2009, though some of the ads migrated to the site's "casual encounters" section to avoid the new rules.

Following these changes, critics of Craigslist, such as U.S. Sen. Richard Blumenthal of Connecticut, lambasted the site for making money off adult ads on the site, though Craigslist started charging for adult ads as a concession to detractors. Also in 2009, Craigslist faced a public relations setback when the media dubbed medical student Philip Markoff the "Craigslist Killer," because the armed robber and murderer reportedly found his victims via the site's adult advertisements.

In October 2009, Craigslist beat back a lawsuit by Tom Dart, the sheriff of Cook County, Illinois, asking a federal court to order Craigslist to close its adult section. In Dart v. Craigslist, U.S. District Court Judge John F. Grady rejected Dart's effort, writing in his judgment that the suit was barred by Section 230 of the Communications Decency Act of 1996, which broadly immunized interactive websites from attempts to hold them liable for user-provided content. Grady wrote, "Intermediaries are not culpable for 'aiding and abetting' their customers who misuse their services to commit unlawful acts." The New York Times called it "a win for internet speech".

Craigslist's opponents were undeterred and pressed the site to remove its adult site altogether; Craigslist relented in September 2010, blocking access to the adult section and adding a banner that read "Censored."

Craigslist CEO Jim Buckmaster later confessed to some remorse over the decision to remove the adult section, stating in an interview, "For a long time we tried to do what, in our minds, was the principled thing. We ended up doing the pragmatic thing." Some adult ads persisted on the site migrating to Craigslist's "personals" section, which Craigslist removed in 2018 in the aftermath of the passage of FOSTA/SESTA.

=== Feud with the McCains ===
Lacey and Larkin had a longstanding feud with the late Sen. John McCain and his wife Cindy. They believe the McCains exercised considerable influence over their prosecution, using it as a means for revenge. They point to numerous stories published by their flagship publication, Phoenix New Times, that frequently criticized the McCains and embarrassed the McCain clan.

New Times’ McCain coverage included: a series of columns on the Keating 5 controversy of the late 1980s, calling Sen. McCain "the most reprehensible of the Keating 5"; 1994 expose on Cindy McCain's opioid addiction and her theft of pills from a non-profit she ran; a cover story investigating McCain's war hero status; and an article detailing the origins of Cindy McCain's lucrative beer distributorship, which exposed her deceased father's involvement in organized crime.

In her roles as co-chair of the Arizona Human Trafficking Council and the McCain Institute's Human Trafficking Advisory Board, Cindy McCain often inveighed against Backpage, which she accused of facilitating child sex trafficking. The McCain Institute funded academic research targeting Backpage, and Cindy McCain testified before Congress denouncing Backpage.

Cindy McCain was present at the Jan. 2017 hearing before the U.S. Senate's Permanent Subcommittee on Investigations, where Lacey and Larkin refused to testify. Her husband Sen. McCain was a member of that committee and participated in the hearing. Both the senator and his wife supported the Stop Enabling Sex Traffickers Act (later known as FOSTA/SESTA), which supporters claimed was necessary to prosecute Backpage, though that did not prove to be the case. Both McCains praised the seizure of Backpage when it occurred.

Sen. McCain's influence in Arizona, where Lacey and Larkin are being prosecuted, is enormous. As the state's senior U.S. Senator, Sen. McCain supported the nominations of two persons to the federal bench who would ultimately sit on the case, U.S. District Court Judges Susan Brnovich and Diane Humetewa. He also supported the appointment of Backpage's original prosecutor, Dominic Lanza, to the federal bench. Lanza's nomination was held up in committee until after he helped orchestrate the arrests of Lacey and Larkin.

== Backpage ==
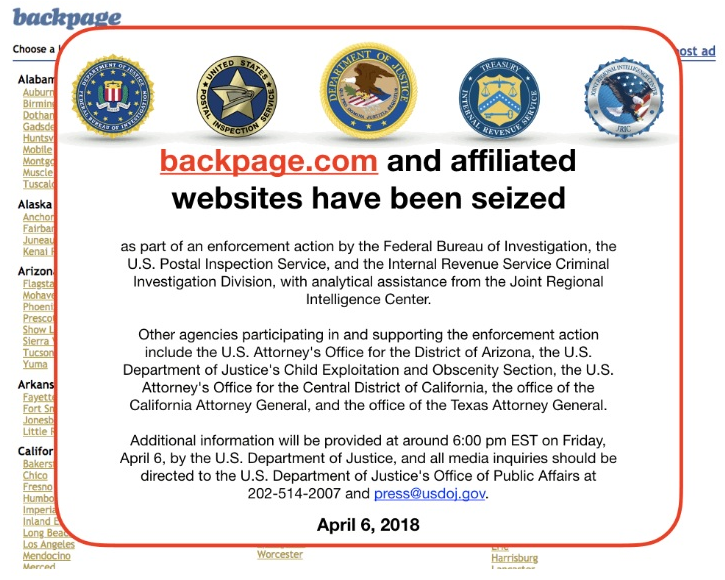
Screenshot from the Backpage website after it was seized by the FBI

Backpage CEO Carl Ferrer anticipated that Backpage would benefit from Craigslist's decision to abandon adult advertising, writing in an internal email that "It is an opportunity for us. Also, a time when we need to make sure our content is not illegal."

The largest share of the adult market went to Backpage, helping to make Backpage the second-largest website catering to classified advertising. The pressure to follow Craigslist's lead in eliminating its adult section began almost immediately, with 21 state Attorneys General signing a letter to Backpage in September 2010, asking that Backpage close its adult section.

Lacey and Larkin had built their journalism brand on resistance to censorship and to authority, so they refused demands that they close the adult section. In a 2019 documentary by staff at Reason Magazine, titled "The War on Backpage.com Is a War on Sex Workers," Larkin said of such demands that, "We didn't kowtow ... We don't kowtow." Lacey added that "It would give the lie to our entire lives, our entire career of being journalists if the government could come in and put their stubby little fingers in our chest and make us ask for our mommy. It ain't going to happen."

At the same time, Backpage beefed up its moderation practices: illegal content, such as commercial offers of sex for money, was forbidden by the site's terms of service; users looking to post or just view content in the adult and dating categories had to certify they were 18 or over; people could easily flag ads suspected of illegal content, and the site provided information about the National Center for Missing and Exploited Children (NCMEC), the national clearinghouse for reports of missing kids, with a link to its Cybertipline.

Backpage used both automated and human moderation (more than 100 persons at a time) to filter for signs of possible illegal content, such as nudity or any of a list of 26,000 terms, URLs, email addresses, etc. In April 2012, Backpage "removed more than 1 million user submissions and posts" and "referred approximately 400 posts for to [NCMEC]," according to one court filing.

And Backpage worked well with law enforcement: Employees responded to subpoenas within a day, sometimes aiding police without a subpoena if a child was involved. Company execs trained law enforcement on spotting sex trafficking on the site, and they testified in court against actual traffickers and pimps.

Over the years, Backpage received effusive praise from law enforcement officials for its extensive efforts to combat human trafficking. In 2011, then-FBI Director Robert Mueller awarded Backpage with a citation for its "outstanding cooperation and assistance in connection with an investigation of great importance."

Nevertheless, activists and politicians continued to go after Backpage and VVM, which were part of the same company from 2004 till 2012. Backpage fought back with a litany of wins in state and federal courts, while VVM's writers and editors debunked the frenzy over sex trafficking as a "moral panic", being driven by various NGOs, politicians and activists such as Cindy McCain.

=== VVM's sex trafficking series ===
In 2011 and 2012, VVM published a series on sex trafficking, which federal law defines as coerced adult prostitution or child prostitution. The VVM series sought to break down some of the myths and misinformation that had led to what Reason Magazine calls "the war on sex workers". Perhaps the most important piece in the series was "Real Men Get Their Facts Straight", by Ellis Conklin, Martin Cizmar and Kristen Hinman; the title was a reference to a viral video campaign begun by the Demi and Ashton Foundation (DNA) a nonprofit, non-governmental organization directed towards fighting child sexual slavery founded by actors Demi Moore and Ashton Kutcher, which claimed that "Real Men Don't Buy Girls". In the article, Conklin, Cizmar and Hinman disproved a much-repeated factoid that anti-sex work activist Kutcher had recently repeated on a CNN talk show: that there are "between 100,000 and 300,000 child sex slaves in the United States today".

This was alarming and untrue, according to VVM, which traced the misinformation to a 2001 University of Pennsylvania study that actually claimed that 300,000 children were "at risk" for sexual exploitation. The study was flawed, never peer-reviewed, and in the end thoroughly discredited, though the false factoid still pops up from time to time.

The series also included a thorough examination of what editor/writer Pete Kotz described as "The Super Bowl Prostitution Hoax," a recurring fallacy, advanced by Cindy McCain and other self-styled sex work "abolitionists", that the Super Bowl draws thousands of prostitutes to the big game's host city and that there is an attendant spike in child sex trafficking. Kotz was neither the first nor the last to debunk this myth, and numerous publications have done so since the cover story ran, yet the urban legend persists.

The series featured a piece on the conclusions of a Women's Funding Network study that apparently were concocted by an Atlanta PR firm. And it included a cover story on the eye-opening work of sociologist Ric Curtis, whose interviews with teenage prostitutes revealed that nearly half were boys, nearly half got into the business through friends, and most did not have pimps.

Finally, in "What Nick Kristof Got Wrong: Village Voice Media Responds," VVM rebutted accusations made by frequent critic and New York Times columnist Nick Kristof, who interviewed a woman who claimed to have been sold as a minor by means of advertising uploaded onto Backpage. VVM pointed out that Backpage had not been in existence in the cities mentioned on the dates she was supposedly trafficked. The unsigned piece states: "Backpage dedicates hundreds of staff to screen adult classifieds in order to keep juveniles off the site and to work proactively with law enforcement in their efforts to locate victims. When the authorities have concerns, we share paperwork and records and help them make cases."

Writing about Larkin and Lacey in an exclusive "inside look" at the federal case against them, published in August 2018, Reason senior editor Elizabeth Nolan Brown observed the following about the significance of the VVM sex-trafficking series in concert with Backpage's legal battles:

"Perhaps most importantly, Lacey, Larkin, and their papers refused to sign onto the idea that America was in the midst of a child sex-trafficking epidemic or that Backpage was part of the problem. Village Voice reporters pushed back in print against New York Times columnist Nicholas Kristof's whopper-filled op-eds on Backpage, Ashton Kutcher's 'Real Men Don't Buy Sex' [sic] campaign, and emerging Super Bowl sex-trafficking myths."

Despite these efforts, in 2011, the Village Voice in New York was protested by demonstrators accusing the paper of promoting sex trafficking, and a coalition of 36 clergies denounced the paper in a full-page ad in The New York Times. Negative news stories about Backpage were frequent.

In a 2011 interview with David Carr of The New York Times, Lacey was defiant, saying, "I am beginning to like our odds. We have all these practicing politicians and concerned clergy after us. We must be doing something right." Larkin and Lacey decided to split the two entities in 2012, selling the newspapers to long-time company executives and taking Backpage solo. In an email to staff from both men explaining the decision, Larkin and Lacey stated, "This particular fight is important and not one that we intend to abandon. At the same time, Backpage's battles are an enormous distraction to publishers, editors and readers of Village Voice Media."

=== Legal battles ===
In the August 2018 Reason piece, Larkin maintained that Backpage, under his ownership, had obliged with the law.

"We've never, ever broken the law," Larkin told Brown. "Never have, never wanted to. This isn't really—I know this is probably heresy—this isn't about sex work to me. This is about speech."

Backpage won several significant victories in federal and state courts during its 14-year lifespan, overturning three state laws targeting Backpage in Tennessee, New Jersey and Washington state.

Judges in these cases found that Backpage was protected both by the First Amendment and by the CDA's Section 230, which largely holds interactive computer services harmless for user-generated content. In the 2013 Tennessee case, U.S. Circuit Judge John Nixon found the Tennessee law targeting adult advertising on Backpage to have run afoul of the First Amendment, Section 230, and the Commerce Clause of the Constitution, writing, "The Constitution tells us that - when freedom of speech hangs in the balance - the state may not use a butcher knife on a problem that requires a scalpel to fix."

Sometimes, the judges leaned almost exclusively on Section 230, as in a 2011 Missouri case, M.A. v. Backpage, in which the plaintiff claimed that her pimp advertised her at the age of 14 on Backpage. But the federal judge in the Missouri suit dismissed the claim based on Section 230, noting, "Congress has declared such websites to be immune from suits arising from such injuries. It is for Congress to change the policy that gave rise to such immunity."

Cook County, Illinois' Sheriff Dart sued Craigslist in 2009 over adult ads and lost. In 2015, he targeted Backpage using a different legal tactic. Instead of engaging Backpage directly, Dart wrote a letter on his official letterhead to MasterCard and Visa, warning them that because they were processing payments in connection to adult ads on Backpage, they could be engaged in illegal activity, specifically money laundering. The credit cards ceased transactions with Backpage, and Backpage sued. In Nov. 2015, the Seventh Circuit Court of Appeals found in Backpage's favor, ruling that Dart had violated the First Amendment and that the sheriff could not assume that the speech on Backpage's adult section was illicit.

Federal Judge Richard Posner wrote the decision, observing that a lot of "adult" speech was legal and protected by the Constitution:

Nor is Sheriff Dart on solid ground in suggesting that everything in the adult section of Backpage's website is criminal, violent, or exploitative. Fetishism? Phone sex? Performances by striptease artists? (Vulgar is not violent.) One ad in the category 'dom & fetish' is for the services of a 'professional dominatrix'—a woman who is paid to whip or otherwise humiliate a customer in order to arouse him sexually . . . It's not obvious that such conduct endangers women or children or violates any laws, including laws against prostitution.

The combination of the First Amendment and Section 230 seemed to offer a stalwart shield for Backpage against civil and criminal action, so much so that in July 2013, 49 state Attorneys General signed a letter to Congress, name checking Backpage and asking that Section 230 be amended "so that it restores to State and local authorities their traditional jurisdiction to investigate and prosecute those who promote prostitution and endanger our children."

In October 2016, one of the signatories to that letter, California Attorney General Kamala Harris, announced the indictment of Lacey, Larkin and Ferrer on state pimping charges, calling Backpage "the world's top online brothel". Ferrer was arrested in Texas, while Larkin and Lacey presented themselves for arrest in Sacramento, where prosecutors fought their release on bond, keeping them in custody for four days and at one point, displaying them in orange jumpsuits in a jail cell located inside the courtroom.

Out on bond, Lacey and Larkin denounced Harris' action as an unconstitutional, election-year stunt. She was running for the U.S. Senate at the time. In a joint statement, they wrote: "Make no mistake; Kamala Harris has won all that she was looking to win when she had us arrested. She issued her sanctimonious public statement, controlled her media cycle and got her 'perp walk' on the evening news."

Harris was elected to the U.S. Senate in November, but Larkin and Lacey beat the pimping charges against them not once, but twice: first when a judge threw them out in December 2016, citing the First Amendment and Section 230; when Harris refiled just before leaving office at the end of the year, a new judge threw them out in August 2017, with only some of the new money laundering charges left hanging until the federal charges, filed in 2018, would be adjudicated.

=== U.S. Senate hearing and federal indictment ===
Backpage earned $135 million in 2014, according to a U.S. Senate report. A February 2015 appraisal said the company was worth more than $600 million. In 2015, Larkin and Lacey reportedly sold Backpage to Ferrer for $603 million, with Lacey and Larkin loaning Ferrer the money to buy them out. Despite having sold it, Larkin and Lacey were subpoenaed (along with Ferrer and other contemporaneous company execs) to appear before the U.S. Senate's Permanent Subcommittee on Investigations (PSI), infamous for its onetime use by the former chair, Sen. Joseph McCarthy, to investigate alleged communists in the U.S. government.

Chaired in 2017 by Ohio Republican Senator Rob Portman, the PSI had spent nearly two years investigating Backpage, producing a report titled, "Backpage's Knowing Facilitation of Online Sex Trafficking," which alleged that Backpage edited ads in its adult services section in order to sanitize them and hide their supposedly illegal nature, thereby facilitating both prostitution and sex trafficking. The report was released on January 10, 2017, the day that Larkin, Lacey, et al. appeared before the subcommittee, where they were harangued by angry senators (including the newly sworn in Kamala Harris) while each witness declined to answer questions based on their First and Fifth Amendment rights in the U.S. Constitution. Notably, Senator McCain was a member of the committee and denounced Backpage in his remarks. Cindy McCain was present for the hearing as an audience member.

The day before the hearing, Backpage took down its adult section, affixing the word "Censored" in red letters across it, much as Craigslist had done in 2010. In a statement from Larkin and Lacey linked to the site, they both noted that they had sold the company in 2015, but that they supported the new owner against what they saw as "an assault on the First Amendment."

The Justice Department used information from the Senate report to produce a 93-count indictment in March 2018. The indictment centred on Lacey and Larkin, and accused them and other company officers of money laundering, participating in a criminal conspiracy, and facilitating prostitution. In April it was announced that Backpage CEO Carl Ferrer had pleaded guilty and would testify against other Backpage officials. Of the seven charged, all pleaded not guilty. Company officials insist they hosted trafficking sites unwittingly. Backpage was shut down by federal authorities in April 2018. With the closure of Backpage, "devastated" sex workers turned to social media. To them, Backpage's demise meant the end of safeguards and a reliable revenue stream in a profession that's not going anywhere.

=== Later developments ===
In July 2018, the federal grand jury returned a superseding indictment, replacing the previous indictment and adding 7 more charges for a total of 100. Backpage sales director, Dan Hyer, one of the original 7 defendants, pleaded guilty in August 2018 to one count of conspiracy. Six remaining defendants, including Larkin, await trial, which will be underway in the fall of 2021.

In August 2019, Reason Magazine published secret, internal DOJ memos, revealing that Backpage cooperated with federal and state law enforcement to rescue lost children and help convict the traffickers of both women and children. Mike Masnick, editor and founder of the Silicon Valley insider publication, techdirt.com, wrote that the memos proved that "the government knew all along that Backpage was one of its best partners in stopping sex trafficking", but a judge in the case has ruled that the memos are attorney work product, and therefore cannot be used at Larkin and the others' trial, despite their exculpatory nature.

Both memos warn against prosecuting Backpage, with the first stating that "any prosecution of Backpage would likely have to overcome Backpage's efforts to actively cooperate with law enforcement", and the second stating that in regard to the site's owners and operators (including Larkin), DOJ attorneys "have yet to uncover compelling evidence of criminal intent or a pattern of reckless conduct regarding minors".

The U.S. Government Accountability Office (GAO) released a report in June 2021, explaining that the combination of the takedown of Backpage in 2018 and the passage of federal legislation known as FOSTA/SESTA, which basically outlawed prostitution advertising in the United States, had disrupted the online marketplace for adult advertising, causing it to move overseas, beyond the reach of U.S. law enforcement. As a result, "the FBI's ability to identify and locate sex trafficking victims and perpetrators was significantly decreased following the takedown of backpage.com". Masnick wrote that the studies' conclusions should not be a surprise, "Thanks to FOSTA and also to the takedown of Backpage, the FBI is now finding it really difficult to actually track down traffickers".

The federal trial commenced on September 1, 2021. After eight days and four witnesses,Judge Susan Brnovich declared a mistrial. The judge had warned the prosecution to avoid discussion of child sex trafficking and to keep their focus on the charges of facilitating prostitution. Two prosecution witnesses discussed child sex trafficking. The judge felt this testimony unfairly tainted the jury. She said she had given government attorneys "some leeway" to discuss sex trafficking before the jury but that the prosecution "abused" that leeway in its opening statement and in its questioning of witnesses.

"The government, as prosecutors, are held to a higher standard," Brnovich said as she ruled from the bench. "Their goal is not to win at any costs, but their goal is to win by the rules."

Brnovich scheduled a new trial for Feb. 22, 2022. She later recused herself from the case. Federal Judge Diane Humetewa was appointed to replace her. In a Jan. 20, 2022 article in Reason, Elizabeth Nolan Brown writes:

A new federal trial was supposed to start in February, but it's been postponed as the parties battle over whether the case should be totally dismissed. In December, a district judge dismissed the defendant's motion to dismiss; they responded by appealing to the 9th Circuit Court of Appeals.

On September 2, 2022, a three-judge panel of the Ninth Circuit Court of Appeals heard oral arguments in the defense's appeal of Humetewa's ruling. The defense argued that the case should be dismissed because a new trial would violate the Fifth Amendment's prohibition on Double Jeopardy. Though the defendants had moved for the mistrial in 2021, their attorneys argued that the prosecution "goaded" them into doing so by engaging in intentional misconduct; specifically, by focusing too much on the subject of child sex-trafficking.

On September 21, 2022, the appeals panel ruled against the defendants, upholding Humetewa's ruling and finding that the prosecution "had no reason to sabotage its own trial." The decision reportedly made it likely that Lacey, Larkin, et al. would face a retrial sometime in 2023.

== Death ==
Larkin died July 31, 2023, of a self-inflicted gunshot wound in Superior, Arizona, eight days before his trial in federal court was to begin on charges he facilitated prostitution. He was 74.

== Honors ==
- Arizona Civil Libertarian of the Year, 2008
- Phoenix Business Journal, "Professional Recognition" (for standing up for migrants' rights) 2017
