= John Doherty =

John Doherty may refer to:

== Sportspeople ==
- John Doherty (boxer) (born 1962), British boxer
- John Doherty (English footballer) (1935–2007), English footballer
- John Doherty (first baseman) (born 1951), first baseman for the Angels
- John Doherty (Irish footballer) (born 1908), Irish footballer
- John Doherty (pitcher) (born 1967), pitcher for the Tigers and Red Sox
- John Doherty (runner) (born 1961), English-born long-distance runner for Ireland
- John Joe Doherty, Irish sportsperson
- Ken Doherty (track and field) (John Kenneth Doherty, 1905–1996), American decathlete

== Others ==
- John Doherty (chef) (born 1958), American chef
- John Doherty (Irish politician) (1785–1850), Solicitor-General for Ireland
- John Doherty (musician) (1900–1980), Irish fiddler
- John Doherty (New York politician) (1826–1859), New York politician
- John Doherty (trade unionist) (1798–1854), UK trade unionist
- John Joseph Doherty (1919–1942), United States Navy officer awarded the Distinguished Flying Cross

== See also ==
- John Dougherty (disambiguation)
- John Docherty (disambiguation)
- Jack Daugherty (disambiguation)
- Jack Doherty (disambiguation)
