= Jack Dougherty =

Jack Dougherty may refer to:

- Jack Dougherty (ice hockey)
- Jack Dougherty (actor)
- Jack Dougherty (baseball)

== See also ==
- Jack Daugherty (disambiguation)
- John Dougherty (disambiguation)
