= Knife in the Water (band) =

American band

- Origin: Austin, Texas, U.S.
- Years active: 1997–2006, 2017–present

Knife in the Water is an American band from Austin, Texas, formed in 1997 by Aaron Blount.

== History ==
Knife in the Water was formed in Austin in 1997. The band's debut album, Plays One Sound and Others, was released in 1998. The Austin Chronicle later wrote that the album became a local success in Austin and received airplay on KUT.

In a 2000 feature on the band, Phoenix New Times discussed Knife in the Water's first two albums and described the group's music as quiet, subtle, melodic, and difficult to categorize. Similar descriptions would come in retrospective reviews by Stanton Swihart on AllMusic.

The band's second album, Red River, followed in 2000. Critics identified it as "country-gospel blues". Their third album, Cut the Cord, was released in 2003.

After an extended period of inactivity, the band reunited in 2017 and returned with new material from Reproduction. Reproduction was released on March 3, 2017.

== Reception ==
Reviewing the band's debut, AllMusic described Plays One Sound and Others as "lo-fi, gothic country-psychedelia". Rolling Stone reviewer David Fricke wrote of the record, "This record gets you nowhere fast, which is hardly a problem. You'll be in no hurry to leave." In a retrospective review, Pitchfork described the band's first three albums as marked by "slow dread and bare-wrought tension".

== Discography ==
=== Studio albums ===
- Plays One Sound and Others (1998)
- Red River (2000)
- Cut the Cord (2003)
- Reproduction (2017)
