= Jack Doherty =

Jack Doherty may refer to:

- Jack Doherty (footballer, born 1915) (1915–1990), Australian rules footballer for Melbourne and South Adelaide
- Jack Doherty (footballer, born 1921) (1921–1998), Australian rules footballer for North Melbourne
- Jack Doherty (potter) (born 1948), Northern Irish studio potter and author
- Jack Doherty (YouTuber) (born 2003), American prank YouTuber
- John Doherty (Irish footballer) (born 1908, also known as Jack "Dot" Doherty), Northern Irish footballer

== See also ==
- John Doherty (disambiguation)
- Jock Doherty (1894–1957), Australian rules footballer for South Melbourne and North Melbourne
- Jack Docherty (born 1962) is a Scottish writer, actor, presenter and producer.
