= John Dougherty =

John Dougherty may refer to:

- John Dougherty (author) (born 1964), Northern Irish author
- John Dougherty (journalist), American investigative journalist
- John Dougherty (Missouri politician) (1857–1905), American politician
- John Dougherty (Illinois politician) (1806–1879), American politician
- John Dougherty (rugby league) (1931–2025), Australian rugby league footballer
- John Dougherty (bishop) (1932–2022), American prelate of the Roman Catholic Church
- John Joseph Dougherty (1907–1986), American prelate of the Roman Catholic Church
- Johnny Dougherty, American former labor leader

== See also ==
- John Doherty (disambiguation)
- Jack Daugherty (disambiguation)
