= New Times Broward-Palm Beach =

American newspaper

- Type: Weekly newspaper (until 2016); Online newspaper
- Owner: Voice Media Group
- Editor: Tom Finkel
- Founded: 1997
- Headquarters: 3050 Biscayne Blvd, Suite 901; Miami Florida
- Country: United States
- Website: browardpalmbeach.com

New Times Broward-Palm Beach is a news website that, until 2016, also published a weekly print newspaper; it is part of the Voice Media Group chain. The original paper split off from the Miami New Times in 1997 under the auspices of then editor-in-chief Tom Walsh. Walsh was succeeded by Chuck Strouse, who was replaced in 2005 with Tony Ortega.

In March 2007, Ortega was appointed editor-in-chief of the company's flagship paper, The Village Voice. In April 2007, Robert Meyerowitz was named editor-in-chief, though he departed the following May to take an endowed chair at the University of Alaska. In 2009, Eric Barton was hired as editor; in June 2012, he left the company when the paper's editorship was combined with that of Miami New Times, where Strouse became editor. Tom Finkel is currently the editor of both papers. In September 2012, Village Voice Media executives Scott Tobias, Christine Brennan, and Jeff Mars bought Village Voice Media's papers and associated web properties from its founders and formed Voice Media Group.

In 2014, parent company Voice Media Group consolidated its South Florida newsrooms within the Miami New Times office. New Times ceased print publication in 2016; it now operates as a web-only publication.
