= John Docherty =

John Docherty may refer to:

- John Docherty, 1890s footballer for Bury and Sheffield United, see List of Bury F.C. players (1–24 appearances)
- John Docherty (footballer, born 1935), Scottish football wing half
- John Docherty (footballer, born 1940) (1940–2024), Scottish football player and manager
- Jack Docherty (John Docherty, born 1962), Scottish actor, writer, presenter and performer
- John Docherty (boxer) (born 1997), British boxer

== See also ==
- John Doherty (disambiguation)
