= Michael Lacey (editor) =

American journalist (born 1948)

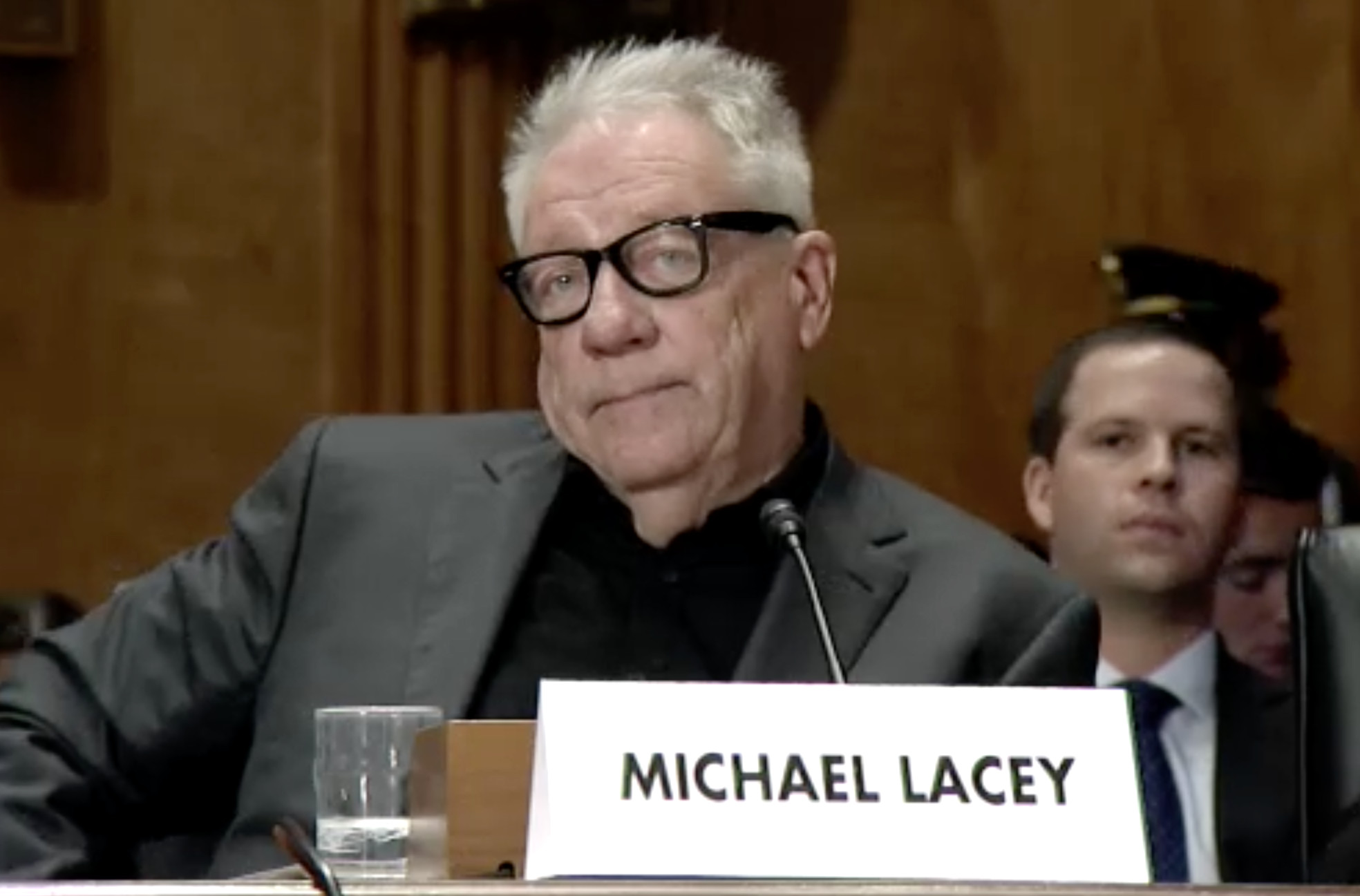
- Born: July 30, 1948 (age 78); Binghamton, New York
- Occupations: Journalist, editor, publisher, advocate
- Employer: Village Voice Media (formerly)

Michael G. Lacey (born July 30, 1948) is an Arizona-based journalist, editor, publisher and First Amendment advocate. He is the founder and former executive editor of the Phoenix New Times, which he and his business partner, publisher Jim Larkin, expanded into a nationwide chain of 17 alternative weeklies, known as Village Voice Media (VVM).

The company focused on long-form, magazine-style journalism, and included such papers as the Village Voice in New York, LA Weekly, Miami New Times and the OC Weekly in Orange County, California, among others. Lacey's papers prized investigative reporting and set a high bar for writing. His writers won more than 3,800 writing awards, including 39 Livingston Awards for Young Journalists, 67 James Beard Foundation Journalism Awards, 39 Investigative Writers and Editors awards, five finalists for the Pulitzer Prize, and one Pulitzer for LA Weekly culinary scribe Jonathan Gold, the first ever for food writing. His writers focused on police misconduct, political corruption and abuse of power, and he and his reporters often became targets for retribution by political enemies and law enforcement. The most famous of these retaliatory incidents was Maricopa County Sheriff Joe Arpaio's arrests of Lacey and Larkin, after the pair exposed illegal grand jury subpoenas that demanded notes and other investigative material from journalists at Phoenix New Times, as well as information on the papers' online readers.

The arrests of two prominent newspapermen caused a national outcry, and the county attorney dropped the case. Lacey and Larkin sued, eventually receiving a $3.75 million settlement. They used the settlement to create the nonprofit Frontera Fund, which donated the money to pro-immigrant organizations in Arizona.

Lacey and Larkin sold VVM to company execs in 2012, separating the company from Backpage.com, a classified listings site they created in 2004 to compete with Craigslist.org.

Backpage came under criticism from state attorneys general and nonprofits that accused the company of facilitating prostitution and sex trafficking through its adult, dating and massage sections. Backpage cooperated with law enforcement and moderated its site for illegal activity, but attorneys general and others demanded the site take down all adult-oriented ads, even though federal court rulings found the ads to be First Amendment-protected speech. The ads also enjoyed Section 230 immunity, which generally holds websites harmless for content posted by users.

In 2015, Lacey and Larkin sold the company to its CEO, Carl Ferrer.

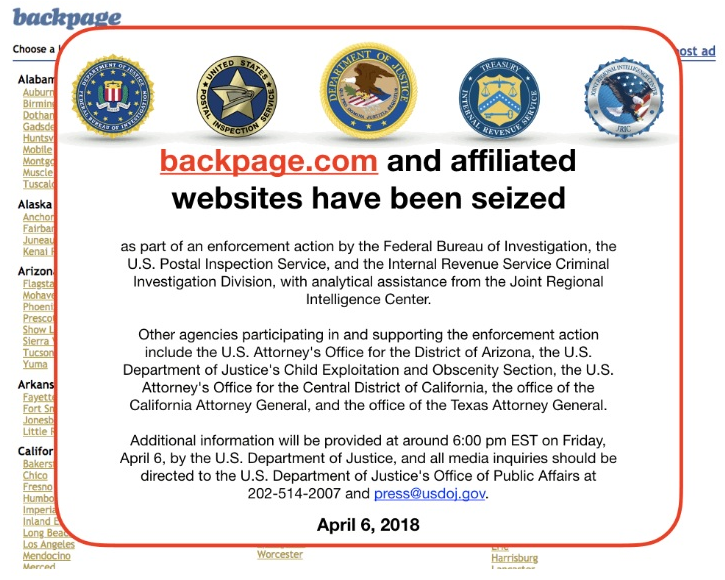
Screenshot of Backpage.com following the seizure of the company by the FBI

In October 2016, then-California AG Kamala Harris had Lacey, Larkin and Ferrer arrested on pimping charges. Harris was running for U.S. Senate at the time. The pimping charges were twice thrown out based on the First Amendment, Section 230 and the AG's lack of jurisdiction, which Harris was aware of when her office filed the charges.

On April 6, 2018, the FBI raided Lacey and Larkin's homes and seized Backpage, removing it from the internet. Lacey and Larkin were arrested, held for a week, then released on $1 million bonds. They contend their prosecution is political payback for their 40-plus years in the newspaper industry, during which they made powerful enemies such as Backpage-critics Sen. John McCain and his wife Cindy.

They and four former Backpage execs face up to 100 counts of facilitating prostitution, money laundering and conspiracy. All six have pleaded not guilty. Their trial commenced on Sept. 1, 2021. After eight days and four witnesses, Judge Susan Brnovich declared a mistrial. During the trial, the judge warned the prosecution to avoid discussion of sex trafficking and child sex trafficking, which the defendants are not charged with, and to keep the focus on the actual charges of facilitating prostitution under the U.S. Travel Act. But the prosecution's opening statement and two prosecution witnesses both discussed child sex trafficking. The judge felt that the cumulative effect of the government's opening statement and the prosecution's questioning of these witnesses unfairly tainted the jury.

Brnovich scheduled a new trial for February 22, 2022. She later recused herself from the case. Federal Judge Diane Humetewa was appointed to replace her. In a Jan. 20, 2022 article in Reason, Elizabeth Nolan Brown reported the following: "A new federal trial was supposed to start in February, but it's been postponed as the parties battle over whether the case should be totally dismissed. In December, a district judge dismissed defendants' motion to dismiss; they responded by appealing to the 9th Circuit Court of Appeals."

On September 21, 2022, a three-judge panel of the Ninth Circuit Court of Appeals denied the defendants' request that the court reverse Humetewa and dismiss the case because a new trial would violate the U.S. Constitution's prohibition on Double Jeopardy. The panel wrote that "the government’s misconduct" during the trial "was not so egregious as to compel a finding" that prosecutors intended to provoke a mistrial, the legal standard for dismissal in this instance. A new trial reportedly could take place in 2023.

Larkin committed suicide on July 31, 2023, a week before the second trial was set to begin. Humetewa rescheduled the trial to begin on August 29, 2023.

The jury returned a verdict on November 16, 2023, finding Lacey guilty of one count of international concealment money laundering and not guilty on one count of money laundering. On 84 additional counts against Lacey, the jury returned no verdict, with Humetewa declaring a mistrial on those counts. Of his four co-defendants, two were found not guilty of all charges, and two were found guilty on multiple counts.

In January 2024, federal prosecutors filed notice of their intent to retry Lacey on the outstanding 84 counts on which the jury was hung. In April 2024, Humetewa ruled on an outstanding defense motion made at trial, acquitting Lacey of 50 counts of those 84 outstanding counts, citing "insufficient evidence" to support convictions. The maximum sentence for Lacey's one money laundering conviction is 20 years in prison. Lacey was sentenced on August 28, 2024, to five years in prison and three years of supervised release.

On Sept. 11, 2024, Lacey turned himself in to U.S. Marshals at the federal courthouse in downtown Phoenix to begin serving his five-year sentence. Lacey's attorneys had already filed a notice of appeal and later asked the Ninth Circuit Court of Appeals to release Lacey pending the outcome of his appeal, which could take 2–3 years.

After several weeks in federal detention, the Ninth Circuit Court of Appeals ordered Lacey released while his appeal plays out, finding that Lacey was not a flight risk nor a danger to others.

The Ninth Circuit noted and that “his appeal raises a 'substantial question' of law or fact that is 'fairly debatable' and that, if determined favorably to him, is likely to result in reversal on the single count of conviction.”

== Early life ==
Michael Lacey was born in Binghamton, New York. His father was a sailor-turned construction worker. His mother was an opera singer and registered nurse. Lacey attended Essex County Catholic grade schools in Newark, New Jersey. In 1966, he graduated from Arts High School, an integrated public school in Newark, where he was a member of the student council.

Lacey credited his father for his early interest in journalism, saying his dad made him read the New York Journal-American newspaper on a daily basis. Lacey also started a newspaper in grade school.

He grew up as a "bright, bookish boy" who toughened up with age. On Lacey's knuckles are tattooed the words "Hold Fast," a famous sailor's motto that was also tattooed on his father's fingers.

In 1970, Michael Lacey co-founded the newspaper that eventually became Phoenix New Times

After graduation from high school, Lacey moved to Tempe, Arizona to attend Arizona State University. He took one journalism class before dropping out to start his own student newspaper, which would eventually become the Phoenix New Times.

In response to the 1970 Kent State massacre and the U.S. incursion into Cambodia during the Vietnam War, Lacey helped organize a student demonstration on campus, demanding the U.S. flag at the university be flown at half-staff in honor of the four people killed at Kent State. Then-Arizona Gov. Jack Williams ordered the flag be defended "with whatever force necessary," but the head of campus security lowered the flag briefly to placate the students.

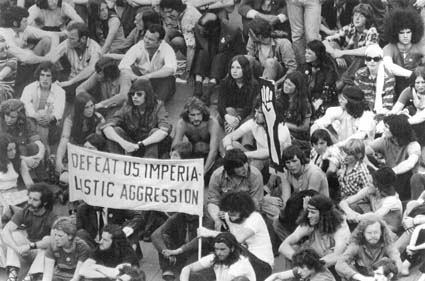
Lacey was motivated by opposition to the Vietnam War to create what became Phoenix New Times

Lacey and other anti-war activists were angered by the Arizona Republic's hostile editorial view of student demonstrators. The Republic's political cartoonist Reg Manning depicted them as "campus terrorists", showing a disheveled, long-haired student with a torch in one hand and a bloody knife in the other, and the words, "Hang ivy on me – and call me a student."

In a 2005 New York Magazine profile, Lacey said of the paper's founding: "We didn't want to burn down the ROTC building, we just wanted to lower the flag because it was the right thing to do. Somehow, we thought we needed to start a newspaper to get the nuances of that point across. And to have a little fun. Throw a little spirit of Mad Magazine into the debate."

A former employee of Lacey's wrote, "Mike Lacey was a Vietnam protester, an Irish kid from Jersey who'd dropped out of Arizona State." As an alternative to the ultra-conservative Arizona Republic, he started a paper that "would cover politics, culture and music for the sex-drugs-rock'n'roll generation."

== Newspaper career ==
Founded by Lacey and several others, Phoenix's first weekly alternative newspaper was called the Arizona Times. The aspiring journalists behind it blew their first deadline, eventually publishing on June 9, 1970, with 16,000 copies, featuring a lead story by Lacey about a demonstration to honor Kent State's victims at ASU's Goodwin Stadium.

In the beginning, the paper's "office" was in a closet-like space adjacent to a dress shop in an area where ASU students lived in off-campus housing. There, Lacey and other early contributors could be seen pasting up the paper's contents "on white boards for offset printing." Lacey first sold blood then plasma to keep the paper going. The publication quickly made a name for itself by punching above its weight, with investigative pieces from Lacey about the details of Republican U.S. Senator Paul Fannin's arrest for DWI, and how the Arizona Republic quashed a story about a rising Republican star's secret files on local precinct committeemen.

Soon rechristened New Times, the paper was initially organized as a collective, with each person having an equal say in how the paper was run. The women's movement was ascendant, and women played a key role in the paper's content, contributing cover stories on the powerful old-boys club known as the Phoenix 40. There were also pieces on women's health and how to obtain an abortion in nearby California, where abortion was legal, unlike Arizona, where it was not before the 1973 U.S. Supreme Court ruling Roe v. Wade.

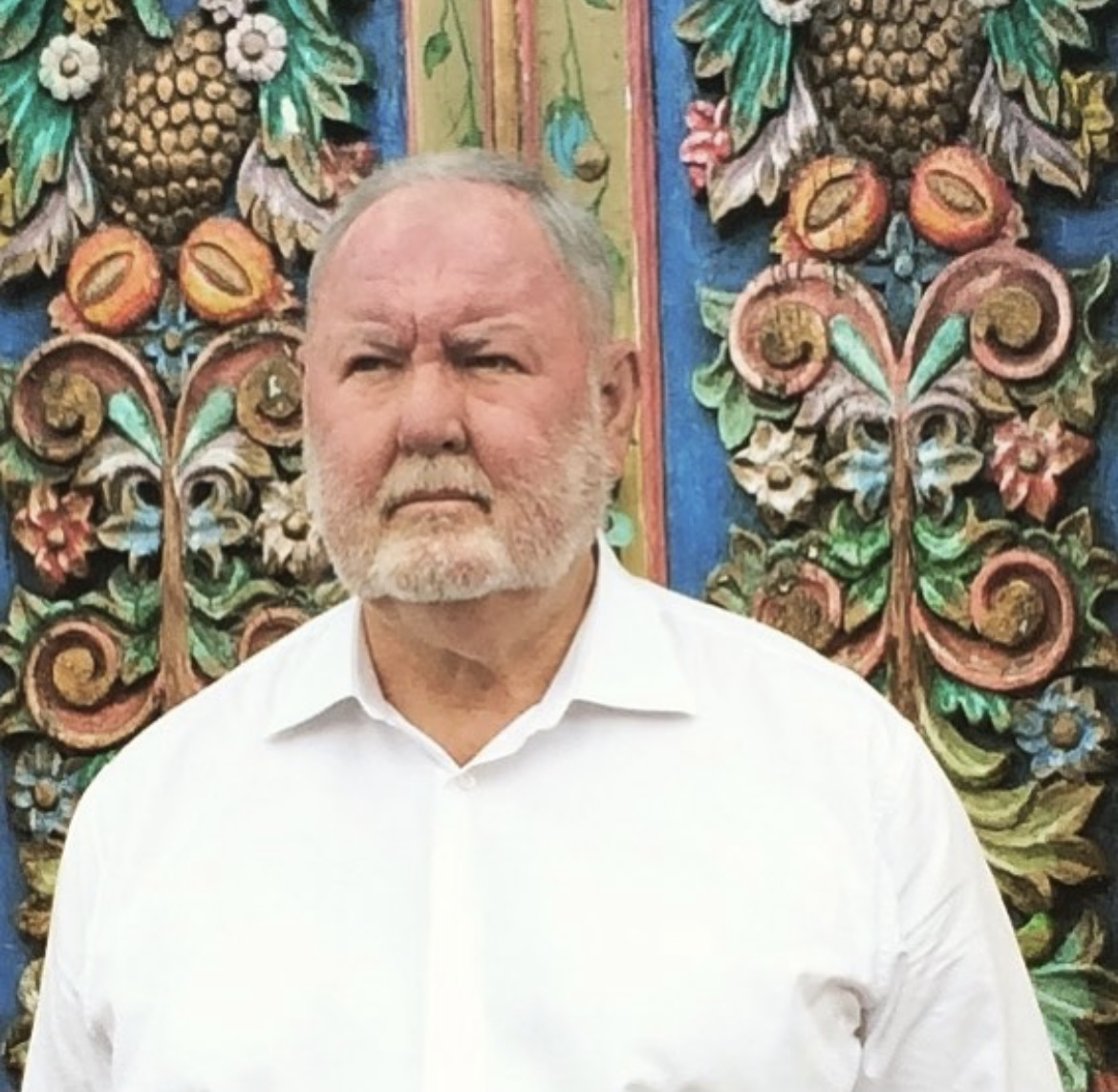
Recent photo of Jim Larkin, publisher of Phoenix New Times and later, Village Voice Media

One of New Times' early legal battles involved ads for a referral service for abortion providers in California. The City of Tempe sued New Times over the ads, which were illegal under state law. New Times lost the first round, but the Arizona Court of Appeals overturned the conviction and invalidated the law in question in the wake of Roe v. Wade.

Two years after the founding Jim Larkin joined New Times as business manager. They were called Lacey'n'Larkin, the editor-publisher duo who, over the decades, bought and started alternative weeklies across the country. In the early years, Lacey, Larkin and others sold ads and assisted in an attempted expansion to Tucson. New Times was forced to go to court against the University of Arizona, which unfairly restricted the distribution of the paper on campus. The case went all the way to the Arizona Supreme Court, which found in favor of the upstart paper, ruling that "the regulations are an unconstitutional infringement on the right to a free press as guaranteed by the First Amendment".

In the 1970s the newspaper went public, with Lacey, Larkin, et al. selling stock in a bid to keep the paper afloat.The effort raised $38,080, but Lacey later wrote that the "long hours" devoted to it and the "grueling dynamic of the collective" led to burnout among many participants, precipitating an exodus in 1974-75. Lacey moved to Boston to study architecture, and Larkin went into the printing business.

Using their combined stock options, Lacey and Larkin regained control of the paper in 1977, and took it private, renaming it Phoenix New Times with Lacey as editor and Larkin as publisher.

From a circulation low of 16,000 in 1977, it grew to 140,000 by the 1990s, with annual revenue of $8.6 million Beginning in 1983 Lacey and Larkin bought and started multiple other alternative newspapers, and by 2000 they owned eleven. In 2005 they bought the Village Voice and five others. The company had a market value of $400 million and a combined circulation of 1.8 million.

A self-described "prick" who comes complete with "spiky gray hair, watery pale-blue eyes", Lacey was known for his bombastic style; he described his editorial philosophy as: "Our papers have butt-violated every goddamn politician who ever came down the pike! The ones who deserved it. As a journalist, if you don't get up in the morning and say 'fuck you' to someone, why even do it?" There was a sense among his competitors that his papers were vicious corporate sharks, out to annihilate, not compete.

To his employees-he was demanding with a volatile temper, he made enemies, but, was fiercely loyal to the people he liked, and, he drank. His employees also admired him as an executive editor who held them to a high standard. John Mecklin, editor of the SF Weekly praised Lacey as "one of the best journalists I've ever known" and a "great writer". Rick Barrs, editor of New Times Los Angeles, lauded Lacey's dictate that all editors write some of the time, so as to "keep your chops up."

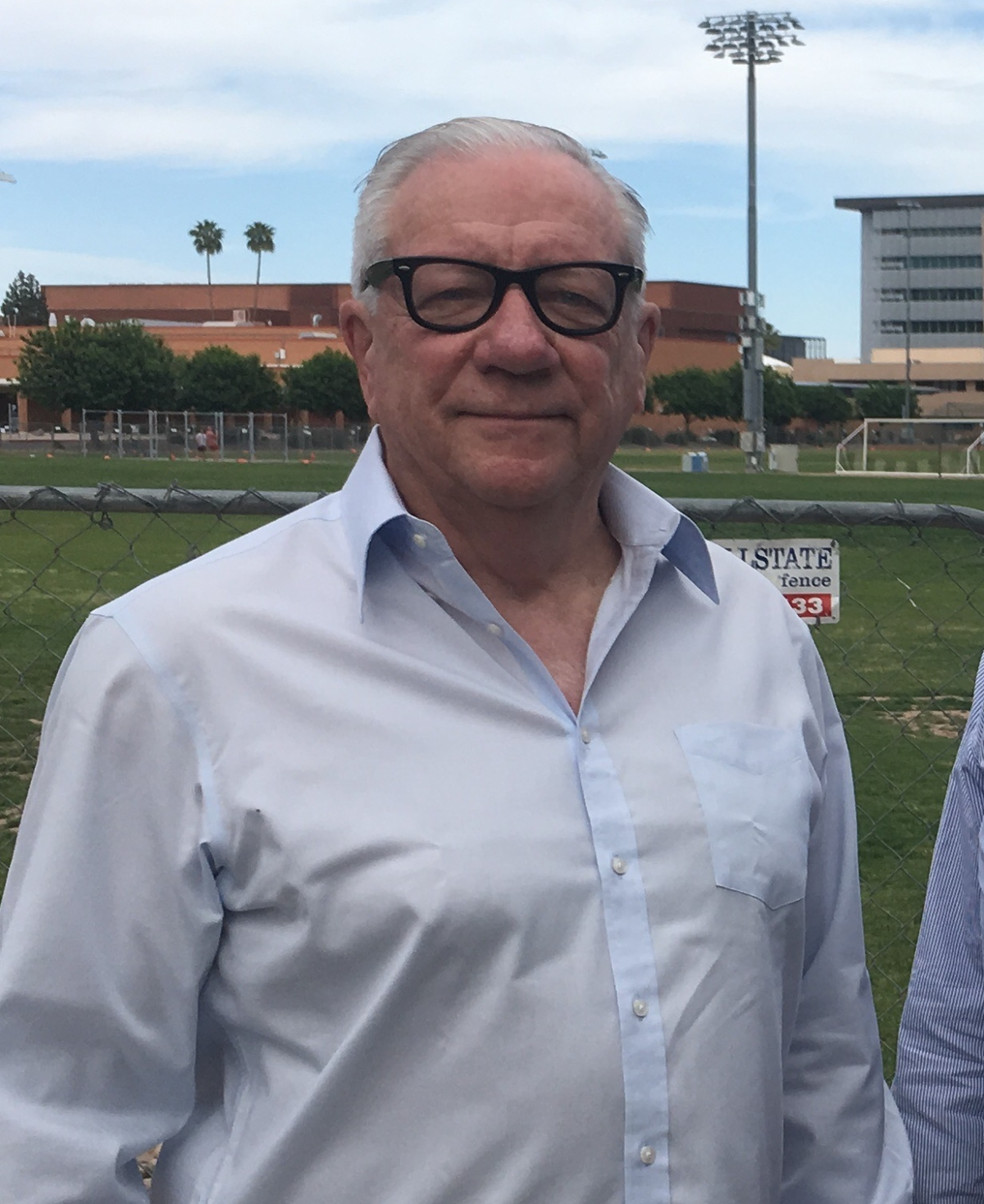
A photo of editor/publisher Michael Lacey in 2019

"He can be offensive, but he can also be honest and caring," Barrs said. "He's a brash guy, but at least I know where he stands."

Lacey made clear that the editor of each paper was responsible for its content, a mix of long-form journalism, features, news shorts, and music, film and arts criticism. Said Lacey: "If you're the editor [of a New Times paper], it's a complete principality that you rule. I set the level of expectation..."

His papers were often known for unforgettable stories "with characters that burst off the page and plot twists no one could have predicted. These stories changed lives, cities, and occasionally landed the people at the center of them in front of a judge."

Lacey and Larkin both came from "blue collar Irish stock" and shared an "in-your-face, screw-you" attitude. With Larkin as "the business brains of the operation" and Lacey as its "erratic editorial genius", the two men "built a free newspaper empire on hustle, idealism, an antagonistic attitude toward authority—and paid classified ads".

Larkin once described their partnership by saying, "I stay out of editorial. He stays out of this end of the business. If you try to cross the boundary either way, it dilutes the stock."

Their 40-plus years in journalism were immensely fruitful. From 1983 to 2005, New Times, Inc. embarked on nearly two decades of expansion, acquiring alternative weeklies from coast to coast. Major acquisitions during this time included Denver's Westword (1983), Miami New Times (1987), Dallas Observer (1991), Houston Press (1993) and SF Weekly (1995), among others. The expansion culminated in NTI's announcement in 2005 that it was merging with the Village Voice in New York City to create Village Voice Media, with 17 papers and 1.8 million readers.

Editorially, Lacey proved his chops. Over time, his writers and editors won more than 3,800 writing awards, including five Pulitzer finalists and an actual Pulitzer Prize for food writing by the LA Weekly's restaurant critic Jonathan Gold.

In addition to the Pulitzer finalists, NTI/VVM's writers won scores of national journalism awards, such as the James Beard Foundation awards for food writing, the Livingston Awards for Young Journalists, the Sigma Delta Chi Awards, the Society of Professional Journalists, Investigative Reporters and Editors, the Maggie Awards, and the Best of the West, to name a few.

Locally, the Phoenix New Times came to dominate the Arizona Press Club's annual awards. During one stretch in the late 1990s/early 2000s, PNT's reporters took home the honor of journalist of the year eight years in a row, and 12 out of 16 years in all.

== Battles with law enforcement ==
Phoenix New Times' reporting regularly challenged the power structure of Phoenix and Arizona, including all levels of law enforcement. Lacey's columns and cover stories critical of police and prosecutors drew the ire of Arizona law enforcement and their leaders.

=== Phoenix Police Chief Ruben Ortega ===
Ruben Ortega served as chief of the Phoenix Police Department from 1980 till he retired in 1991. New Times columnist Tom Fitzpatrick referred to him as a "powerful and dangerous man", who "acted as if the entire concept of civil liberties was alien to him."

During Ortega's tenure, Lacey wrote several pieces critical of the police chief, including a cover story on the Jan. 1984 shooting of Standley Wesley, an unarmed, 18-year-old black man, by a white Phoenix cop. Ortega gave a press conference after the shooting, claiming that Wesley struggled with the detective, who then shot Wesley in the front side of his abdomen.

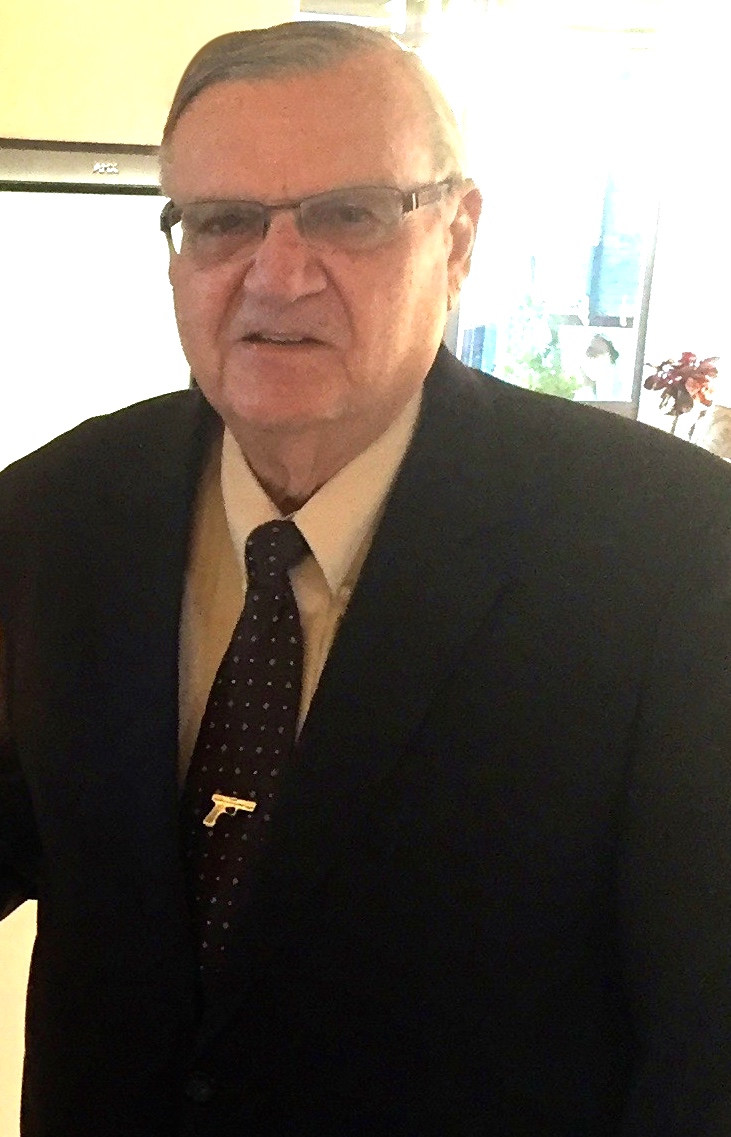
Former Maricopa County Sheriff Joe Arpaio, one of the many law enforcement officials who retaliated against Michael Lacey and Jim Larkin

Lacey spoke to witnesses who said Wesley did not resist arrest. They said Wesley had been struck by the cop and then shot from behind. Lacey gained entrance to Wesley's hospital room, where the young man lay paralyzed from the waist down. Lacey later published an article in the New Times accusing Ortega of being a liar, with photos of Wesley showing the entry wound in his back. Ortega was forced to publicly retract his earlier statement.

In May 1984, Lacey was arrested on suspicion of DWI by the Phoenix police, who said officers initially pulled Lacey over for screeching his tires and driving with his lights off. Police spokesman Sgt. Brad Thiss told the Phoenix Gazette that Lacey had been booked into jail instead of cited on the DWI because he was "uncooperative and verbally abusive". The charges were later dismissed. The Gazette item notes that Lacey "was the author of a story that accused Police Chief Ruben Ortega of lying about the shooting of an 18-year-old man by a police detective." Thiss told the paper, "After the story, the department no longer would cooperate with New Times reporters".

New Times' art director and resident cartoonist Bob Boze Bell lampooned the arrest the following year in a two-page cartoon, "Mike Lacey in the Streets of Firewater", in which Bell offered this "crime-stoppers" tip: "If you write articles calling the Chief of Police a liar, don't squeal your tires with the lights off."

=== County Attorney Rick Romley ===
In 1990, Lacey targeted both Chief Ortega and newly elected Maricopa County Attorney Rick Romley in a series of articles on Club 902, a Phoenix dive bar notorious for the crack sales that took place in its parking lot. Lacey revealed that Romley benefited from two liens on the property that amounted to "nearly $1,000 a month in payments". Romley had come to power on an anti-drug platform, and Phoenix's anti-drug program recently had been praised by President George H.W. Bush as a model for the nation.

Lacey reported that in 1989, Club 902 accounted for 123 arrests, 65 of them narcotics-related. Romley denied knowledge of the arrests or the drug-dealing. Lacey discovered that the Phoenix Police Department had not forwarded records of the arrests to the state liquor authority, which needed them in order to investigate and revoke the bar's liquor license. Lacey wrote that the relationship between Chief Ortega and Romley was "too cozy", explaining that the chief "depends on the county attorney to prosecute his arrests", and that a prosecutor "can make the chief's record look like Swiss cheese".

In 1992, Lacey accused Romley and Ortega of seeking revenge by trying to involve him in an infamous corruption sting run by the County Attorney and the police department known as AzScam. As part of the probe, an undercover informant named Joseph Stedino posed as a mobster trying to bribe state legislators into supporting the legalization of casino gambling. Ultimately, seven legislators and political operatives were indicted on various charges.

Lacey learned that Stedino investigated him as well for "illegal cocaine activity" at the prompting of the informant's police handlers. Stedino found no evidence to back up the claim and the investigation was dropped, though local news outlets carried the story of Lacey being investigated for cocaine. Police records showed that Stedino began asking people about Lacey one day after his New Times column reported that the state liquor authority was prepared to shut down Club 902 as a result of his investigative series. Lacey wrote: "While I have not written a single word about legalized gambling, ever, I've written thousands of words about Romley and Ortega."

=== DPS Director Ralph Milstead ===
AzScam was not the only time Ortega had Lacey investigated for drugs. In Feb. 1993, Arizona Department of Public Safety Director Ralph Milstead revealed to New Times reporter David Pasztor that in the late 1980s his friend Chief Ortega asked him to have DPS investigate Lacey for "alleged cocaine smuggling" because Ortega didn't want the Phoenix Police Department's "fingerprints" on the case.

DPS' Criminal Investigations Bureau spent two weeks investigating Lacey, pulling his bank accounts, even tailing him around Phoenix and on flights to Miami, where New Times Inc. had purchased a weekly newspaper that became Miami New Times. Lacey was cleared in the DPS probe, but Pasztor wrote that Ortega kept trying to frame Lacey, enlisting a small time criminal, Ernie Toscano, to help set up Lacey for a drug purchase. Toscano attempted to contact Lacey with a ruse about a story that might interest the New Times, but Lacey wasn't interested and a meeting never took place. Said Lacey: "I was never involved in cocaine smuggling . . . The entire thrust of what Ortega was up to was to try to silence a critic."

=== Sheriff Joe Arpaio ===
From the time Joe Arpaio was first elected to be the Sheriff of Maricopa County in 1992, the Phoenix New Times provided its readers with scathing coverage of the many controversies arising from Arpaio's tenure: the deaths in his jails and the costly lawsuit payouts that resulted; the questionable antics of his deputies and his posse; the targeting of his political opponents; and unconstitutional sweeps of Latino neighborhoods and raids of local businesses on the hunt for undocumented immigrants.

A 2004 column by New Times reporter John Dougherty prompted Arpaio to seek revenge. Dougherty wrote that he was looking for information on several real-estate parcels owned by the sheriff worth more than $1 million. But Arpaio was shielding them from public scrutiny. Ironically, Arpaio left his home address unredacted on several public documents and government websites, so Dougherty put the address in his column, which was in turn published to New Times' website.

Dougherty's column ran afoul of a little-known Arizona statute making it illegal to publish a law enforcement officer's home address on the internet. Arpaio pressured his political ally, County Attorney Andrew Thomas, to prosecute Dougherty under this law. Thomas appointed a special prosecutor, who in 2007 used the cover of the grand jury process to issue wide-ranging subpoenas to the New Times, seeking reporters' notes and files as well as the IP addresses of everyone who had visited the Phoenix New Times website over the past three years.

When Lacey and Larkin learned that the special prosecutor, Dennis Wilenchik, had sought an improper meeting with the judge on the case, they revealed Wilenchik's actions in a double-bylined cover story for the Oct. 18, 2007 issue of the New Times, defying grand jury secrecy laws in the process.

Lacey and Larkin wrote: "It is, we fear, the authorities' belief that what you are about to read here is against the law to publish. But there are moments when civil disobedience is merely the last option."

Plainclothes sheriff's deputies later rousted Lacey and Larkin from their homes in the middle of the night and arrested them, trundling them into unmarked cars with Mexican plates. Both men were booked into county jail on class 1 misdemeanor charges of violating grand secrecy laws.

When Lacey was released from jail early that morning he was greeted by a scrum of reporters who asked him why he was arrested. Lacey replied: "We're being arrested for raising hell. It's sort of a tradition journalism has."

The arrests were universally condemned by local and national media as well as civil liberties and press organizations. Within 24-hours of the arrests, Thomas fired Wilenchik as special prosecutor and the charges were dropped.

Lacey and Larkin sued for false arrest, and in 2013 Maricopa County settled with them for $3.75 million. The showdown with Arpaio added to Lacey's "already swashbuckling Media Bad Boy mythology."

In 2013, it was announced that $2 million of the settlement would be used to help create an endowed chair for the Walter Cronkite School of Journalism and Mass Communication at Arizona State University to "specifically to increase coverage of Latino and border issues". By that time, Lacey and Larkin had sold their newspapers, while maintaining ownership of Backpage, which remained a source of controversy for them. Though the ASU donation was unrelated to Backpage, ASU later returned the gift "after opinions diverged about its implementation."

Instead, the full $3.75 million settlement was used to start the Lacey and Larkin Frontera Fund, largely to benefit the Hispanic community that "has borne the brunt of racial animus and civil rights abuses in Arizona."

== Backpage ==
The good times did not last for print journalism, with the Internet devouring advertising profits. Newspapers, and especially free alternative weeklies, were dependent on classified ads for revenue. But Craigslist.org, which launched in 1995, turned that paradigm on its head, giving away most classifieds for free, save for some job listings and the adult advertising that was on the site until 2010, when Craigslist shut down the adult section in response to political pressure.

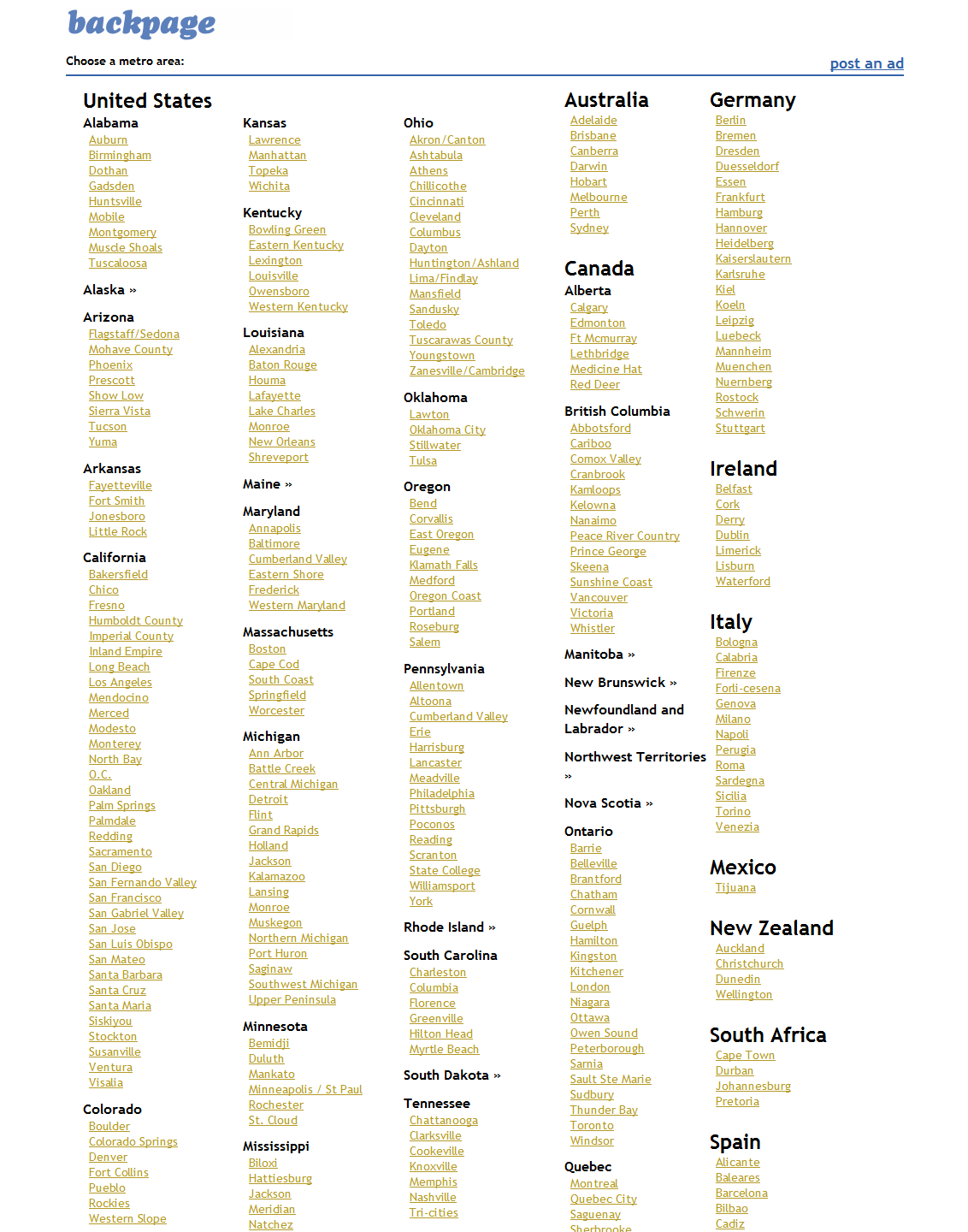
A listing of many of the cities and countries where Backpage operated

The damage to newspapers was immense. In 2009, the Pew Research Center reported that classified ad revenue had been cut in half by nearly-free online ad sites such as Craigslist. New York Magazine dubbed Criagslist's creator Craig Newmark "the Exploder of Journalism" for the effect he'd had on the newspaper industry.

New Times, Inc. reacted to increased Internet advertising with Backpage.com, beginning in 2004, trying to maintain the company's hold on classified ads, including those that traditional newspapers shunned, adult services. The idea for the site came from future Backpage CEO and owner Carl Ferrer, then a New Times salesman as a way to recapture income lost to Craigslist. It evolved out of the literal back page of the Phoenix New Times newspaper and morphed into a massive Internet marketplace.

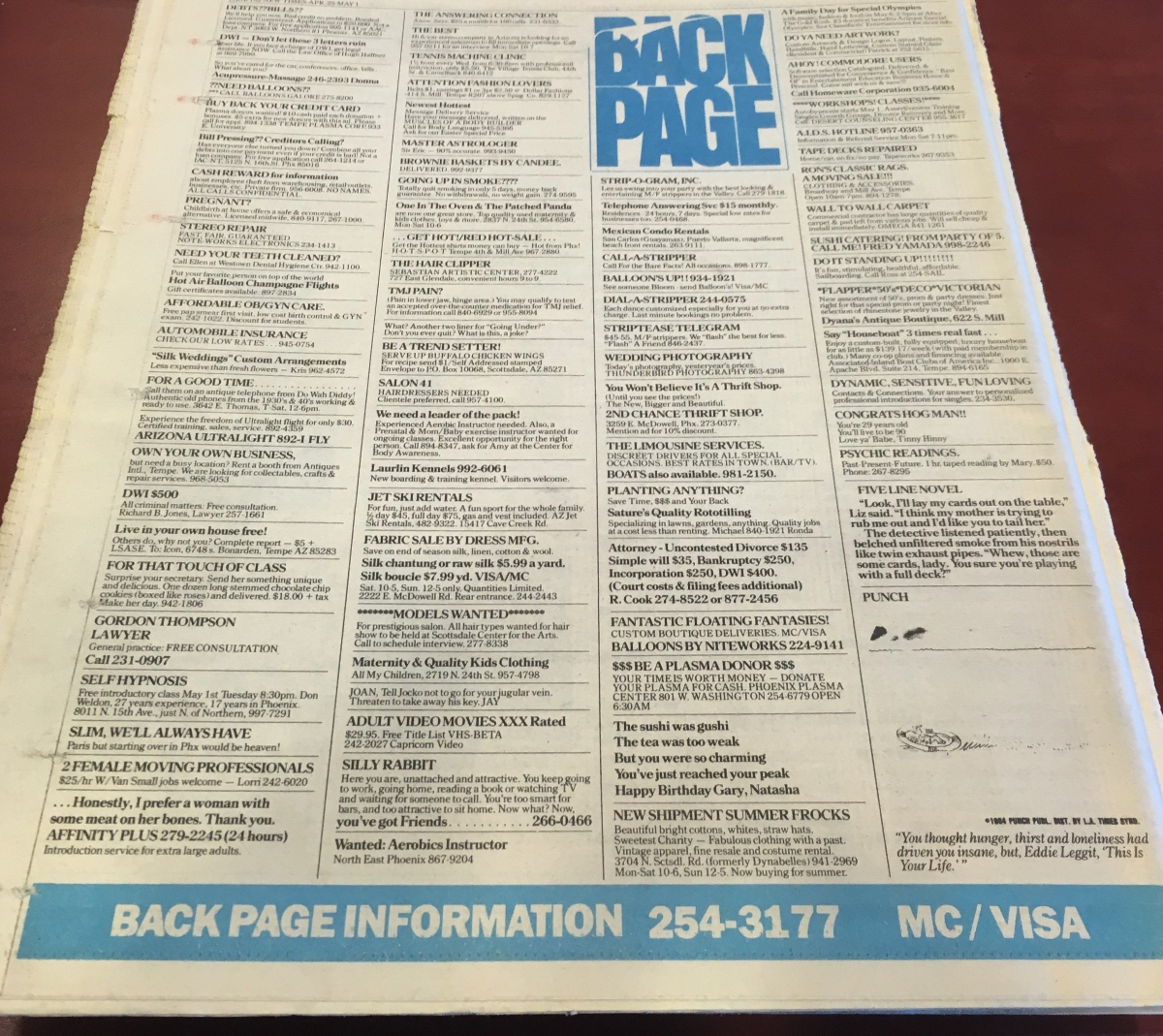
The literal back page of Phoenix New Times, the source of the name for the website Backpage.com

By 2010, after Craigslist shuttered its adult content section, Backpage.com had become the main financial driver of its parent company, then called Village Voice Media. In 2012 Lacey left journalism, selling his interests in 13 newspapers, but keeping ownership of Backpage along with longtime business partner Jim Larkin.

Lacey explained that the sale was driven by the controversy over Backpage and the difficulty in managing the newspapers while fighting legal battles over the online marketplace, saying that it was something that "the local editors don't need to be defusing every morning when they wake up."

Backpage was lucrative and, like Craigslist, featured ads for an array of goods and services, including apartments, car sales, jobs, personals, etc. The site's adult ads—legal advertisements for escorts, striptease, erotic massage and the like—were among the few that Backpage charged users to post. Such ads were common in the "back pages" of alternative weeklies across the country. The ads also appeared in some mainstream dailies and even in the Yellow Pages.

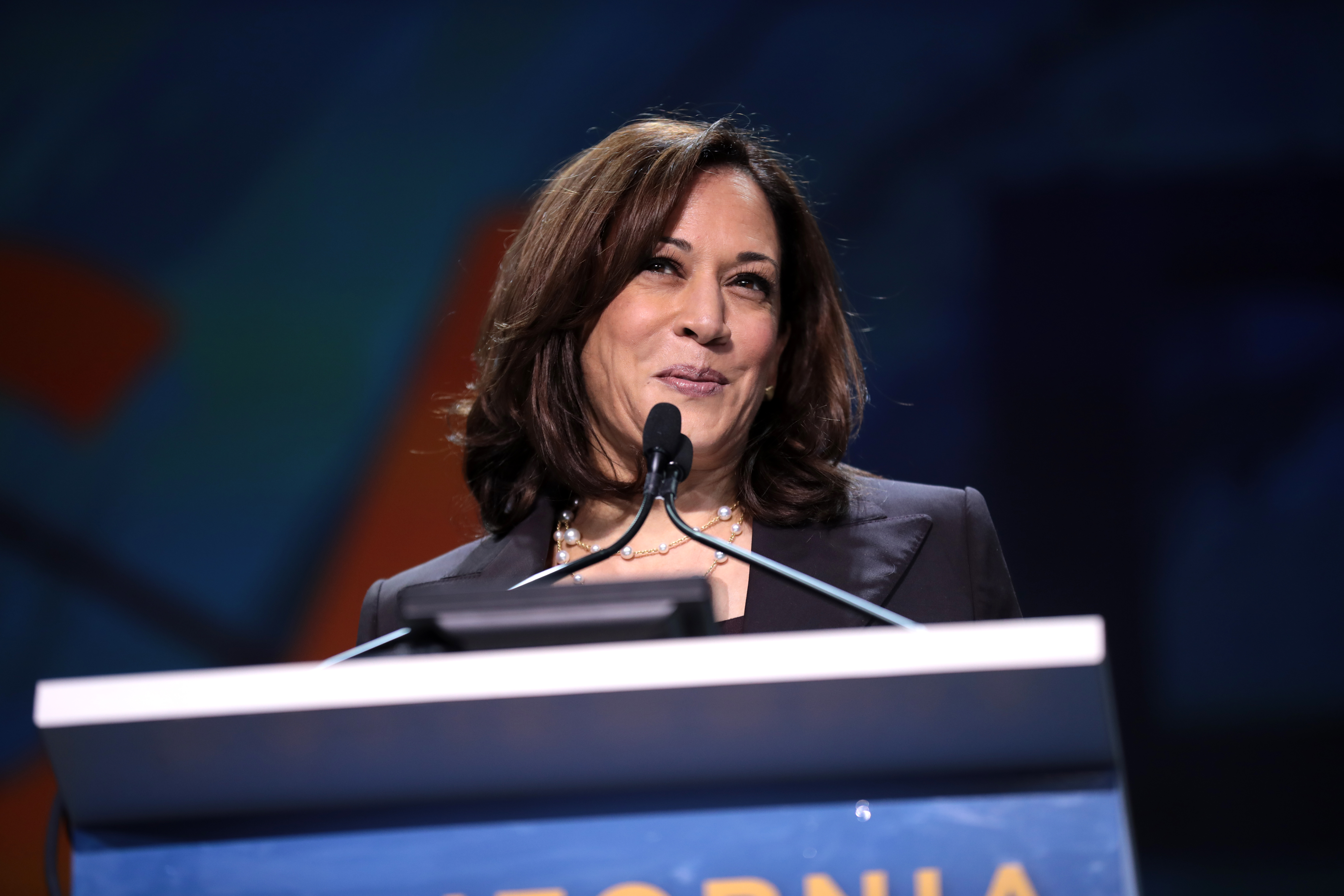
When she was California Attorney General and running for U.S. Senate, Kamala Harris had Michael Lacey and Jim Larkin falsely arrested in relation to Backpage.

Backpage earned $135 million in 2014, according to a U.S. Senate report. A February 2015 appraisal said the company was worth more than $600 million At the time, Backpage was the largest online publisher of adult-themed ads in the world with city-specific sites spanning 97 countries. In the 11 years since it had been launched, it earned some $500 million for its owners. The publication was largely impervious to legal challenges because of the First Amendment and Section 230 of the Communications Decency Act, which protected online publishers from civil or criminal penalties for hosting content posted by third parties. In 2015, Lacey and Larkin sold Backpage to Ferrer.

In October 2016, then-California Attorney General Kamala Harris had Lacey, Larkin and Ferrer arrested on pimping charges. Before bail was granted to the three defendants, Harris had all three appear in a jail cell in the courtroom while dressed in orange jail clothing as news cameras caught it for local broadcasts. Harris was running for U.S. Senate at the time. The pimping charges were twice thrown out based on the First Amendment and Section 230, and the AG's lack of jurisdiction, which Harris was aware of when her office filed the charges.

Harris was elected to the Senate, where the fight over Backpage was heating up. Legal momentum started to change after a senate investigation of the site began in 2015. In Sept. 2016, Backpage was forced to hand over millions of pages of internal business documents to the Senate's Permanent Subcommittee on Investigations, after the subcommittee subpoenaed the documents and Backpage's challenge to the subpoena was denied by the U. S. Supreme Court.

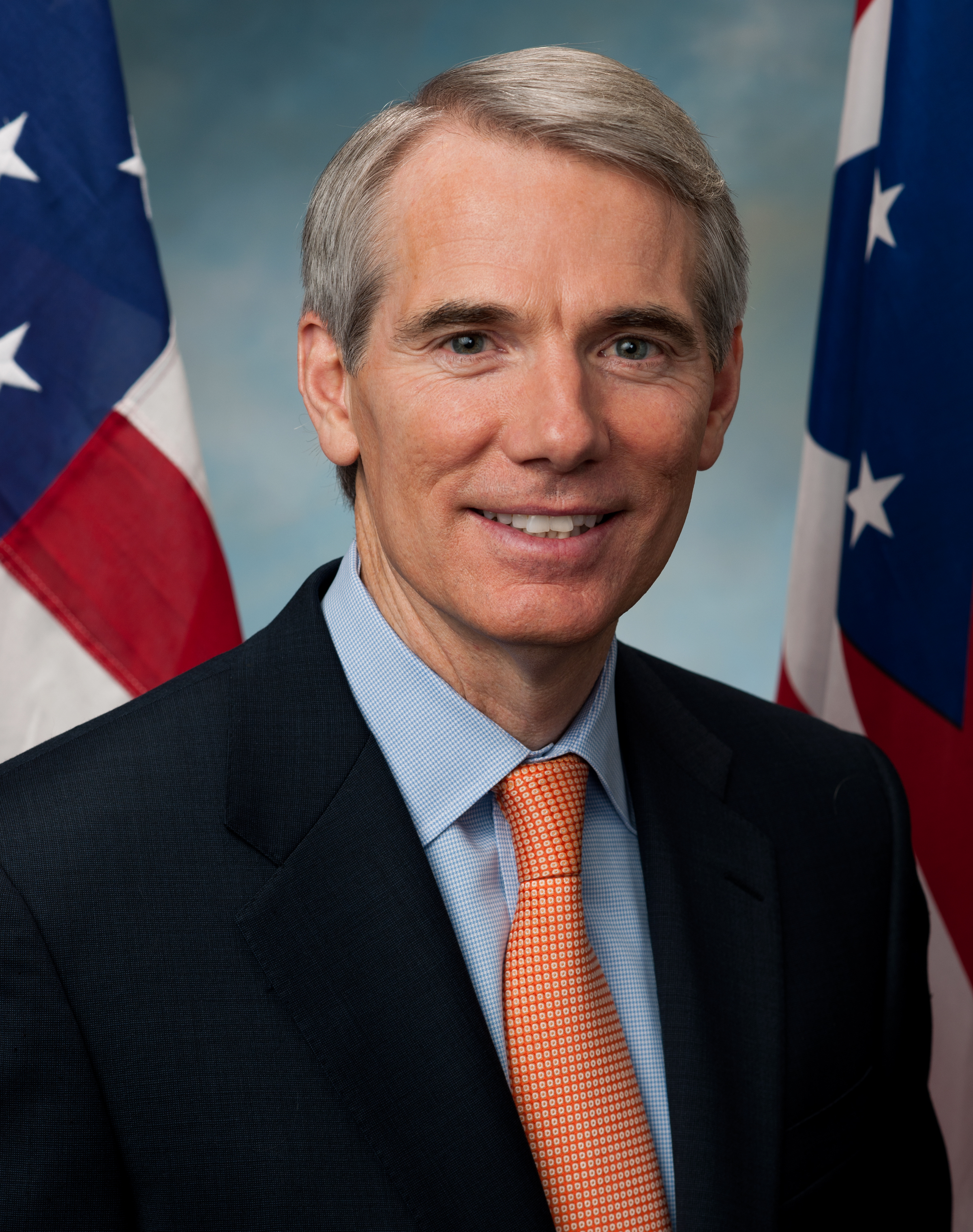
Sen. Rob Portman, R-OH, was one of many politicians who scapegoated Backpage for child sex trafficking

In January 2017, the subcommittee issued a report based largely on these subpoenaed documents, alleging that Backpage "knowingly facilitated sex trafficking". Sen. Rob Portman (R-OH), the committee's chairman, claimed that the report "conclusively shows that Backpage has been more deeply complicit in online sex trafficking than anyone imagined". (The judge in the federal case would later admonish the prosecutors over language concerning sex trafficking).

But Techdirt's Mike Masnick and Reason scribe Elizabeth Nolan Brown were not impressed with Portman's evidence. Masnick wrote: "The report is a joke. The crux of the report is that, via subpoena, the Senate staffers were able to determine that Backpage edits and or bans certain words that indicate an ad is for prostitution. Let me repeat that: the Senate is mainly annoyed that Backpage proactively looks for and blocks situations where it appears that the ads may be for prostitution -- especially involving children. Yet, the Senate investigators twist this to make it sound like a bad thing."

Brown observed that the report itself stated that Backpage cooperated with law enforcement, removed any ads that featured photos of minors, and reported cases of suspected child exploitation to the National Center for Missing and Exploited Children (NCMEC), the national clearinghouse for such reports, sometimes submitting hundreds a month to NCMEC.

The report was released January 9, one day before Lacey was to appear before the subcommittee along with Larkin, Ferrer and two Backpage execs. That same day, Backpage disabled its pages for adult listings, marking them "censored". Lacey and Larkin issued a statement noting that they sold their interests in Backpage in 2015 to Ferrer, but that they supported Backpage. "Today the censors have prevailed", they wrote, calling congressional pressure on the site as "an assault on the First Amendment."

On January 10, Lacey and the others refused to answer questions from Senators on the subcommittee, invoking their rights under the "First and Fifth Amendments" not to testify. WIRED magazine observed that Lacey, Larkin and Ferrer in particular had a reason to take the Fifth, as the second round of the charges filed against them in California were still pending at the time and would not be thrown out till eight months later.

The Justice Dept. used this information to come up with a massive 93-count indictment in March 2018, that centered on Lacey and Larkin, and accused them, and other company officers, with money laundering, participating in a criminal conspiracy and facilitating prostitution under the Travel Act. (In July 2018 the number of charges was upped to 100 in a superseding indictment).

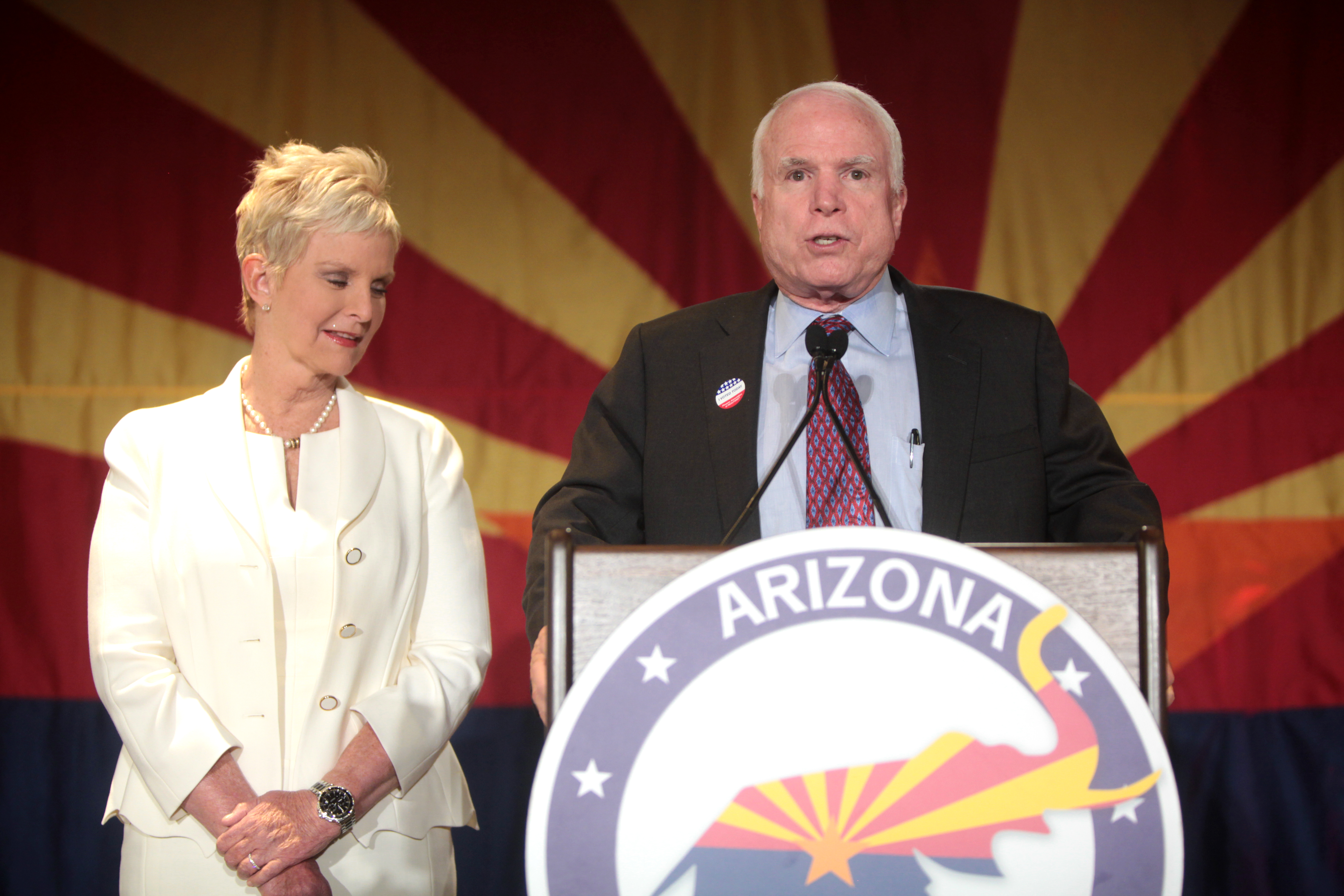
Sen. John McCain, R-AZ, and his wife, Cindy, were implacable enemies of Michael Lacey and Jim Larkin because of critical articles published by Phoenix New Times

The DOJ's use of the Travel Act, a law passed in 1961, was significant because Congress had passed an amendment to Section 230 in March 2018 – known as FOSTA/SESTA—which Senators and Congressmen claimed was needed to prosecute Backpage. Though the law made exceptions for sex trafficking to Section 230 and created new penalties for facilitating prostitution through an interactive website, it was not signed into law until several days following Lacey and Larkin's arrests on April 6, 2018.

In April it was announced that Backpage CEO Carl Ferrer had pleaded guilty and will testify against other Backpage officials. Lacey spent a week in federal custody and was released April 13, 2018 on a $1 million bond.

Lacey's attorneys claim he is protected by the free speech guarantees of the First Amendment. Company officials insist they hosted trafficking sites unwittingly. Backpage was shut down by federal authorities in April 2018. Lacey and Larkin's assets, including their bank accounts, were seized by the federal government, leaving them struggling to pay their attorneys.

With the closure of Backpage, devastated sex workers turned to social media. To them, Backpage's demise meant the end of safeguards and a reliable revenue stream in a profession that's not going anywhere.

Lacey and Larkin remained defiant. In a 2019 documentary by staff at Reason magazine, titled "The War on Backpage.com Is a War on Sex Workers", Lacey said: "It would give the lie to our entire lives, our entire career of being journalists, if the government could come in and put their stubby little fingers in our chest and make us ask for our mommy. It ain't going to happen."

== Feud with the McCains ==
Lacey and Larkin had a longstanding feud with the late Sen. John McCain and his wife Cindy. They believe the McCains exercised considerable influence over their prosecution, using it as a means for revenge. They point to numerous stories published by their flagship publication, Phoenix New Times, that frequently criticized the McCains and embarrassed the McCain clan.

New Times’ McCain coverage included: a series of columns on the Keating 5 controversy of the late 1980s, calling Sen. McCain “the most reprehensible of the Keating 5”; a 1994 expose on Cindy McCain's opioid addiction and her theft of pills from a non-profit she ran; a cover story investigating McCain's war hero status; and an article detailing the origins of Cindy McCain's lucrative beer distributorship, which exposed her deceased father's involvement in organized crime.

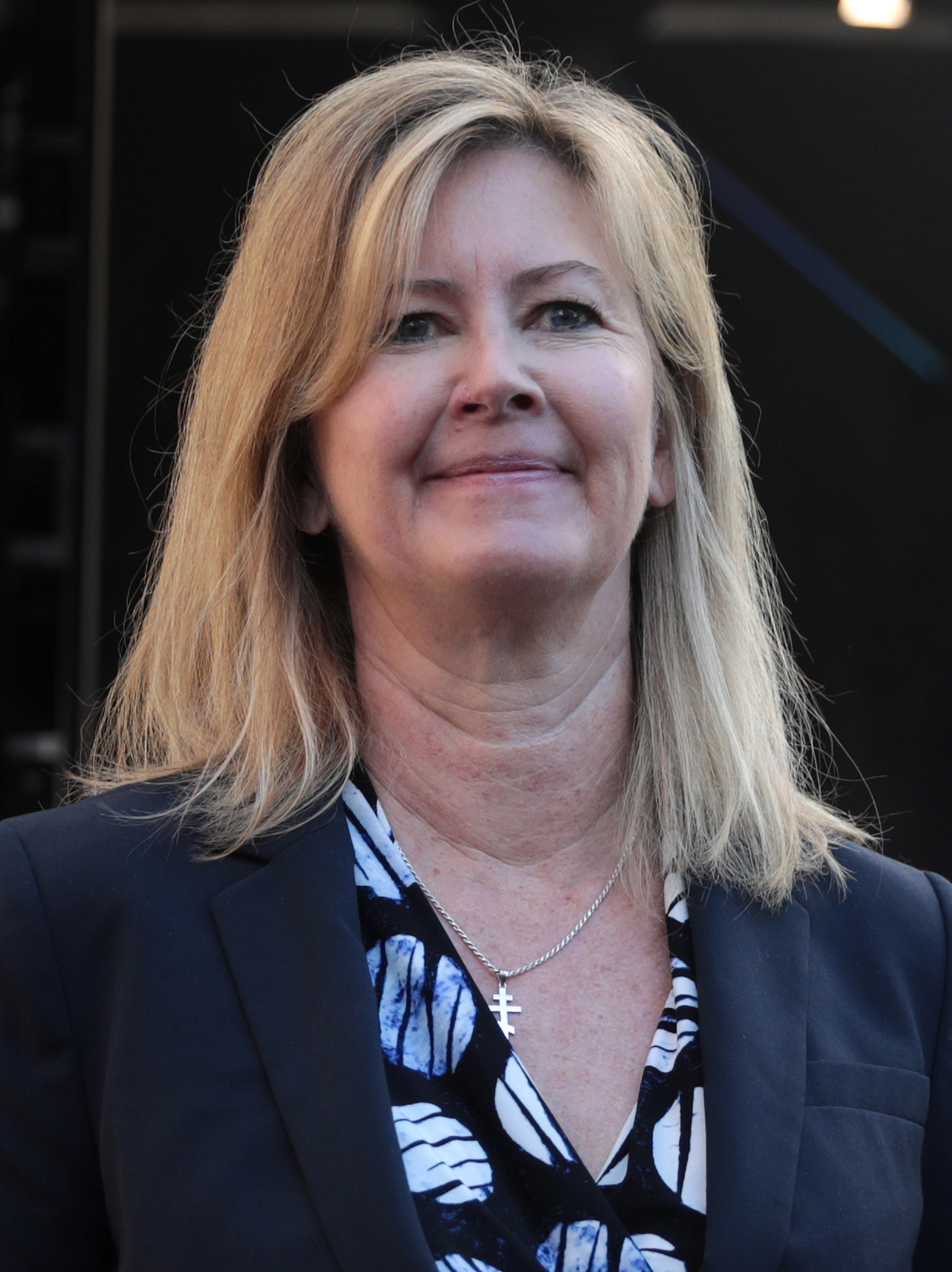
U.S. District Court Judge Susan Brnovich declared a mistrial in the trial of Michael Lacey and Jim Larkin on September 14, 2021

In her roles as co-chair of the Arizona Human Trafficking Council and the McCain Institute's Human Trafficking Advisory Board, Cindy McCain often inveighed against Backpage, which she accused of facilitating child sex trafficking. The McCain Institute funded academic research targeting Backpage, and Cindy McCain testified before Congress denouncing Backpage.

Cindy McCain was present at the Jan. 2017 hearing before the U.S. Senate's Permanent Subcommittee on Investigations, where Lacey and Larkin refused to testify. Her husband Sen. McCain was a member of that committee and participated in the hearing. Both the senator and his wife supported the Stop Enabling Sex Traffickers Act (later known as FOSTA/SESTA), which supporters claimed was necessary to prosecute Backpage, though that did not prove to be the case. Both McCains praised the seizure of Backpage when it occurred.

Sen. McCain's influence in Arizona, where Lacey and Larkin are being prosecuted, is enormous. As the state's senior U.S. Senator, Sen. McCain supported the nominations of two persons to the federal bench who would ultimately sit on the case, U.S. District Court Judges Susan Brnovich and Diane Humetewa. He also supported the appointment of Backpage's original prosecutor, Dominic Lanza, to the federal bench. Lanza's nomination was held up in committee until after he helped orchestrate the arrests of Lacey and Larkin.

== Subsequent events ==
In Aug. 2019, Reason published internal DOJ memos describing how Backpage worked with federal and state law enforcement agencies to rescue trafficked children and women and put their traffickers behind bars. Prosecutors sent the memos to the defense by accident as part of the discovery process in the case, but a district court judge ruled that they could not be introduced at trial, despite their apparently exculpatory nature. Reason writer Elizabeth Nolan Brown contended that the memos show that “authorities have known for years that claims about Backpage [facilitating trafficking] were bogus.”

In June 2021, the U.S. Government Accountability Office published a study, finding that the combination of Backpage's takedown along with the passage of FOSTA/SESTA disrupted and dispersed adult advertising in the U.S. Websites for adult ads migrated to countries that do not recognize U.S. subpoenas. The GAO reported that the “relocation of platforms overseas makes it more difficult for law enforcement to gather tips and evidence”, and the FBI's capacity to “identify and locate sex trafficking victims and perpetrators” has been significantly decreased post-Backpage. The FBI said “this is largely because law enforcement was familiar with backpage.com, and backpage.com was generally responsive to legal requests for information.”

== Trial and mistrial ==
After much delay, the federal trial of Lacey, Larkin and four co-defendants began Sept. 1, 2021. Before and during trial, Judge Susan Brnovich cautioned the prosecution to avoid dwelling on the subjects of trafficking and child sex trafficking, which the defendants are not charged with, and to remain focused on the actual charges of facilitating prostitution under the Travel Act. But the prosecution mentioned sex trafficking and child sex trafficking several times in its opening statement, and two of the four prosecution witnesses testified about child sex trafficking, prejudicing the jury. As a result, on the eighth day of trial, Brnovich granted a defense motion for a mistrial.

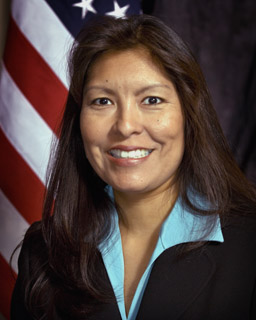
Federal Judge Diane Humetewa replaced Judge Brnovich after Brnovich recused herself from the Backpage case

The judge explained from the bench that in its opening statement and its questioning of witnesses, the prosecution “abused” the “leeway” she had given it to discuss sex trafficking as a subset of prostitution. The “cumulative effect,” she said, “is something that I can't overlook and will not overlook”.

“The government, as prosecutors, are held to a higher standard. Their goal is not to win at any costs, but their goal is to win by the rules,” she said.

Brnovich scheduled a new trial for February. 22, 2022. She later recused herself from the case. Federal Judge Diane Humetewa was appointed to replace her. In a Jan. 20, 2022 article in Reason, Elizabeth Nolan Brown wrote that a new federal trial was supposed to commence in February “but it's been postponed as the parties battle over whether the case should be totally dismissed.” She added that in December 2021, “a district judge dismissed defendants' motion to dismiss; they responded by appealing to the 9th Circuit Court of Appeals.”

On September 2, 2022, a Ninth Circuit Court of Appeals panel heard oral arguments in the defense appeal of Humetewa's decision. The defense argued that the case should be dismissed because a new trial would violate the Constitutional prohibition on Double Jeopardy. Though the defendants moved for the mistrial in 2021, defense attorneys argued that the prosecution "goaded" the mistrial by engaging in intentional misconduct; specifically, by focusing too much on the subject of child-sex trafficking.

On September 21, 2022, the appeals panel ruled against the defendants, upholding Humetewa's ruling and finding that the prosecution "had no reason to sabotage its own trial." The decision reportedly made it likely that Lacey, Larkin, et al. would face a retrial sometimes in 2023.

=== Second Trial ===
The second Backpage trial officially began on August 29, 2023, in federal court in Phoenix, following a three-week delay caused by the suicide of Lacey's co-defendant and business partner, Jim Larkin. Larkin, 74, reportedly died from a self-inflicted gunshot wound near the Boyce Thompson Arboretum in Superior, Arizona, about 70 miles east of Phoenix.

About a week before trial, appearing before a federal magistrate, Lacey and his four co-defendants had formally rejected plea deals offered by the government.

In a pretrial motion, prosecutors asked Humetewa to allow them to mention "sex trafficking" and "child-sex trafficking" as being the same as prostitution. Humetewa ruled that the phrases could be mentioned, as long as they were used in the context of alleged Travel Act violations.

The over-use of such terms was one reason for the 2021 mistrial as the defendants did not face trafficking charges.

Prosecutors' use of exhibits in the second trial referencing sex trafficking and child sex trafficking again led to defense attorneys moving for a mistrial. Humetewa denied those motions.

Before trial, government attorneys had also attempted to ban any mention of the First Amendment, free speech or Section 230 of the Communications Decency Act.

Humetewa ultimately allowed some defense references to the First Amendment, as long as they were not linked to an advice of counsel defense, but the judge barred any mention of Section 230, saying it was "not relevant" because it did not offer immunity for federal crimes, like the Travel Act.

During opening arguments, Assistant U.S. Attorney Andrew Stone told the jury that the Backpage defendants had conspired to facilitate prostitution on the site, strategizing on how to bring more sex ads to the platform. Stone said the defendants made money on only one section, the escort section, which he equated with offers of sex for money, i.e., prostitution. Stone said: "There are such things as legal escorts. The evidence is going to show the term escort used on Backpage, that’s not what it meant.”

A key issue was the moderation of adult ads on the site, which Stone depicted as an attempt to sanitize the site and "make prostitution ads look less like prostitution ads."

In his opening statement, Lacey's attorney Paul Cambria referred to his client as "an old time newspaper guy," who was focused on running the newspaper chain that was financed, in part, by Backpage.com. Cambria argued that a platform wasn't responsible for what a user posts or what happened after an ad was answered, likening Backpage to the telephone service. “If a phone is used in a crime, we don’t prosecute the phone company. We prosecute the people who use the phone,” Cambria said.

The government's star witness was former Backpage CEO Carl Ferrer, to whom Lacey and Larkin sold the company in 2015. Ferrer was allowed to plead guilty in federal court in Phoenix in 2018 to one count of conspiracy to facilitate prostitution, with a possible sentence of up to 5 years, in exchange for testifying against the others indicted by the U.S. government.

Ferrer, who helped create the site as a competitor to Craigslist in 2004, testified that the "vast majority of the revenue" from Backpage was from the escort section ads, which Ferrer described as "prostitution ads."

During cross-examination by the defense, Ferrer said that though there were signs that women on the site were seeking to trade sex for money, he couldn't say "every single one" of the ads was for prostitution.

Ferrer also said there was no way for the site to know whether photos used in the ads were actually of the advertiser because Backpage was a "user-generated site," meaning users posted the images. Regarding Backpage's attempts to assist law enforcement in investigations, Ferrer called the practice "a public relations stunt."

Police who testified at trial admitted that they could not make a prostitution arrest based just on an escort ad on Backpage. Prosecution witness Brian Griffin, a law enforcement officer from Massachusetts, said he could never make an arrest for prostitution based on an ad alone, no matter how explicit the ad's content. He said an ad was the "first step" in a prostitution investigation.

As Courthouse News Service observed, prosecutors claimed every ad in Backpage's escort section was for prostitution. But this assertion was belied by the testimony of a woman sold on Backpage at 15 years old in 2015, who said that twice customers responded to her ad on Backpage, but ultimately, on meeting up, asked only to talk or go for a walk.

During closing arguments, the parties took opposing views of the testimony. Prosecutor Kevin Rapp asserted that it was obvious that the source of Backpage's revenue came from adult advertising. Defense attorney Cambria countered that Backpage cooperated with law enforcement, even earning a certificate of thanks from the FBI. "Why would you think you're breaking the law if the police were asking you to work with them?" he asked.

=== Conviction ===
In November 2023, Lacey was convicted on one count of money laundering, acquitted on another, and the jury deadlocked on 84 other counts. He was convicted of moving assets he had earned from Backpage to Hungarian bank.

On April 23, 2024, 53 of the remaining 84 counts were thrown out. The judge later amended her order so that Lacey was only acquitted of 50 counts, instead of 53. Retrial on the remaining counts is expected in 2024.

Lacey was sentenced on August 28, 2024, to five years in prison and three years of supervised release.

== Awards ==
- Arizona Civil Libertarian of the Year, ("ACLU's highest honor bestowed annually to individuals who make outstanding contributions to the advancement of civil liberties") 2008
- Arizona Music Hall of Fame
- Distinguished Service Award, Arizona Press Club, 2007 (lifetime accolade was given for Lacey's 38 years as a writer, editor and newspaper owner in Arizona)
- New America Award, ("Placed the local sheriff under the microscope and reported on his bias against Maricopa County (Ariz.) residents of color.) 2010
- Golden Quill Award, 1998
- John Kolbe Politics and Government Reporting Award, 2007
- Clarion Award, for newspaper feature writing, 2011, ("Lacey's What's My Mom Worth ...was a departure from ordinary newspaper storytelling.")
- James Aronson Award for Social Justice Journalism, 2011 ("For deploying reporters...to tell vivid tales of the travails and contributions of Latinos Amongst U.S. Their work counters nativist fear-mongering and opens space for a coherent immigration policy.")
- Phoenix Business Journal, "Professional Recognition", (for standing up for migrants' rights) 2017
