= Dallas Observer =

Newspaper in Dallas, Texas

- Type: Alternative weekly
- Format: Tabloid
- Owner: Voice Media Group
- Editor: Patrick Williams
- News editor: Kelly Dearmore
- Founded: October 2, 1980 (45 years ago)
- Headquarters: 2030 Main Street, Suite 410
- City: Dallas, Texas
- Country: United States
- Circulation: 43,810 (as of June 2016)
- ISSN: 0732-0299
- OCLC number: 7095491
- Website: dallasobserver.com

The Dallas Observer is a free digital and print publication based in Dallas, Texas. The Observer publishes daily online coverage of local news, restaurants, music, and arts, as well as longform narrative journalism. A weekly print issue circulates every Thursday. The Observer has been owned by Voice Media Group since January 2013. The Observer is a member of the Association of Alternative Newsmedia.

== History ==
The Observer was started in October 1980 by partners Ken Kirk, Bob Walton, Jeff Wilmont, and Gregg Wurdeman as a weekly local arts and cinema review publication. In 1991, the Observer was bought by New Times Media.

In 1995, the H.L. Mencken Writing Award went to columnist Laura Miller, who went on to become the mayor of Dallas after leaving the Observer.

In 2005, New Times both acquired and adopted the corporate name of Village Voice Media. In September 2012, Village Voice Media executives Scott Tobias, Christine Brennan, and Jeff Mars bought Village Voice Media's papers and associated web properties from its founders and formed Voice Media Group.
