= John Dougherty (journalist) =

American investigative journalist

- Education: Arizona State University
- Occupation: Investigative Journalist
- Children: Jed, Joey

John Dougherty is an American freelance investigative journalist. Subjects he has reported on include: the Keating Five scandal and the S&L crisis, Arizona Governor Fife Symington III, the FLDS Church and its leader Warren Jeffs, and Maricopa County Sheriff Joe Arpaio. In 2010, he ran as a Democratic candidate for U.S. Senate in Arizona.

== Early life and education ==
Dougherty was raised in Fairfax, Virginia. He attended Arizona State University from 1974 to 1981. He graduated with two degrees: B.S. Journalism (1978) and B.S. Economics (1981).

== Career ==
- Phoenix New Times from March 1, 1993, to September 1, 2006
- The Southwest Sage from August 1, 1992, to February 28, 1993
- East Valley Tribune from August 1, 1991, to July 31, 1992
- Half Moon Bay Review from August 1, 1990, to July 31, 1991
- Dayton Daily News from January 15, 1989, to August 1990
- East Valley Tribune from April 1, 1988, to January 15, 1989
- The Phoenix Gazette from June 1984 to April 1988
- The Washington Post intermittently from September 1978 to March 1984

== Selected stories ==
=== The Keating Five ===
John Dougherty's May 21, 1989 front page piece in the Dayton Daily News broke the story of the Keating Five. His source was Edwin J. Gray, former chair of the Federal Home Loan Bank Board. The subsequent congressional ethics committee hearings of Senators Alan Cranston, Dennis DeConcini, John Glenn, John McCain, and Donald W. Riegle began in November of that year.

=== Governor Fife Symington ===
Two years later in 1991, John Dougherty was working for the East Valley Tribune in Mesa, Arizona and was still very interested in the connections between politicians and the S&L crisis. He began looking into Arizona governor Fife Symington III and his role as a board member of Southwest Savings and Loan. He continued his coverage of Symington for over ten years, writing more than 66 articles on Symington. His coverage foreshadowed Symington's 1997 conviction on federal bank and wire fraud charges and resignation as Arizona governor.

=== Sheriff Joe Arpaio ===
John Dougherty began covering Joe Arpaio for the Phoenix New Times when he became sheriff in 1993. Dougherty was involved in a series of court cases with Arpaio that culminated in a 2008 decision to award the Phoenix New Times $40,000 in legal fees.

=== FLDS and Warren Jeffs ===
From 2002 through 2008, Dougherty investigated and reported heavily on the Fundamentalist Church of Jesus Christ of Latter Day Saints, and exposed the actions of their leader Warren Jeffs. He wrote over 35 articles, appearing in the Phoenix New Times, The New York Times, and The Arizona Republic. This series garnered him national attention, including an interview on National Public Radio, and won him the Casey Medal in 2006.

== Awards ==
- 1992, Arizona Press Club's Virg Hill Journalist of the Year
- 1994, Arizona Press Club's Virg Hill Journalist of the Year
- 1995, Arizona Press Club's Virg Hill Journalist of the Year
- Two-time winner of the Arizona Press Club's Don Bolles Award for Investigative Reporting
- 1996, inducted into the Walter Cronkite School of Journalism Hall of Fame
- 2006, Casey Medal for Meritorious Journalism

== 2010 Senate campaign ==
Dougherty finished third in the four-way 2010 Arizona Democratic Senate primary with 24 percent of the vote.
