= Voice Media Group =

American company

- Type: Private
- Industry: Digital Marketing; Media
- Founded: September 1, 2012; 14 years ago
- Headquarters: Denver, Colorado
- Key people: Scott Tobias; Stuart Folb; Jeff Mars; Kurtis Barton; Gerard Goroski
- Revenue: $44.5 million (2024)
- Number of employees: 296 (2025)
- Website: voicemediagroup.com

Voice Media Group (VMG) is an American privately held media company headquartered in Denver, Colorado. VMG owns several newspaper publications across the country. These offerings extend across print, mobile, and digital marketing.

VMG's current properties include a digital marketing agency, V Digital Services, a marketing technology company, V Audience Labs, and media outlets Denver Westword, Phoenix New Times, Dallas Observer, Miami New Times, and Broward New Times.

== History ==
VMG was founded in September 2012, when Village Voice Media executives Scott Tobias, Christine Brennan and Jeff Mars announced an agreement to purchase Village Voice Media's papers and web properties from their founders. The classified web site Backpage.com was not part of the sale.

In 2013, VMG launched a digital marketing agency, V Digital Services, to work with VMG publications and partners around the country to offer digital marketing solutions.

In 2023, VMG launched the marketing technology company, V Audience Labs.

While adding resources to other areas of the business, Voice Media Group has made strategic divestments of some its newspaper properties. On May 6, 2015, VMG announced the sale of Minneapolis City Pages to Star Tribune Media Co. In October 2015, VMG sold the Village Voice in New York City to Pennsylvania newspaper owner Peter Barbey. In October 2017, VMG sold LA Weekly to local owners; the next month, following devastation caused by Hurricane Harvey, it announced that the Houston Press would cease print publication and transition to an online-only entity.

In 2021, Voice Media Group sold the Houston Press to an anonymous buyer.

== Awards ==
VMG's publications have won numerous national journalism awards, including the 2018 George Polk Award for immigration reporting at Phoenix New Times, 2017 Sigma Delta Chi Awards at both Miami New Times and Westword, and the 2014 George Polk Award for sports reporting at Miami New Times.

V Digital Services has received several accolades over the years including, Inc. magazine's “Inc. 500 list” of America's fastest-growing private companies in 2019, 2018 and 2017, several Stevie Awards for Sales and Customer Service.
