= John Doherty (Irish footballer) =

Irish footballer (1908–?)

Personal information
- Full name: John Doherty
- Date of birth: 12 April 1908
- Place of birth: Belfast, Ireland
- Position: Inside left

Senior career*
Years	Team	Apps	(Gls)
- Park End
- Belfast Celtic
- Park End
1926	Woodburn		
1926–1930	Portadown		
1930–1932	Ards		
1932	Cliftonville		
1932–1934	Charlton Athletic	8	(0)

International career
1927–1931	Ireland Amateurs	7	(0)
1928–1932	Ireland (IFA)	3	(0)
- * Club domestic league appearances and goals

John Doherty (born 12 April 1908; date of death unknown), also known as Jack "Dot" Doherty, was an Irish footballer who played as an inside-left and made three appearances for the IFA national team.

== Club career ==
Doherty played for Park End in the North of Ireland Combination, as well as for Belfast Celtic. He joined Woodburn in the Intermediate League for the 1925–26 and 1926–27 seasons, before moving to Portadown in 1927. In 1930 he joined Ards, and later played for Cliftonville in the 1932–33 season. In December 1932 he signed for Charlton Athletic in the Football League, where he played until the end of the 1933–34 season.

== International career ==
Doherty earned seven caps for the Ireland Amateurs from 1927 to 1931. On 21 February 1928, he appeared for Ireland national team in a 4–0 loss against France, though whether the match was a "full international" is disputed. He earned two additional caps for Ireland in 1932 as part of the 1932–33 British Home Championship, appearing in a 1–0 loss against England on 17 October in Blackpool and a 4–1 loss against Wales on 7 December in Wrexham.

== Career statistics ==
=== International ===
Ireland (IFA)
Year	Apps	Goals
1928	1	0
1932	2	0
Total	3	0
