= Miami New Times =

Weekly tabloid newspaper based in Miami

- Type: Alternative weekly
- Format: Tabloid
- Owner: Voice Media Group
- Publisher: Adam Simon
- Editor: Tom Finkel
- Founded: 1987; 39 years ago (as New Times Media)
- Language: English
- Headquarters: 3050 Biscayne Blvd, Suite 901; Miami, Florida, 33137; U.S.
- Circulation: 31,250 (December 2018)
- ISSN: 1072-3331
- Website: miaminewtimes.com

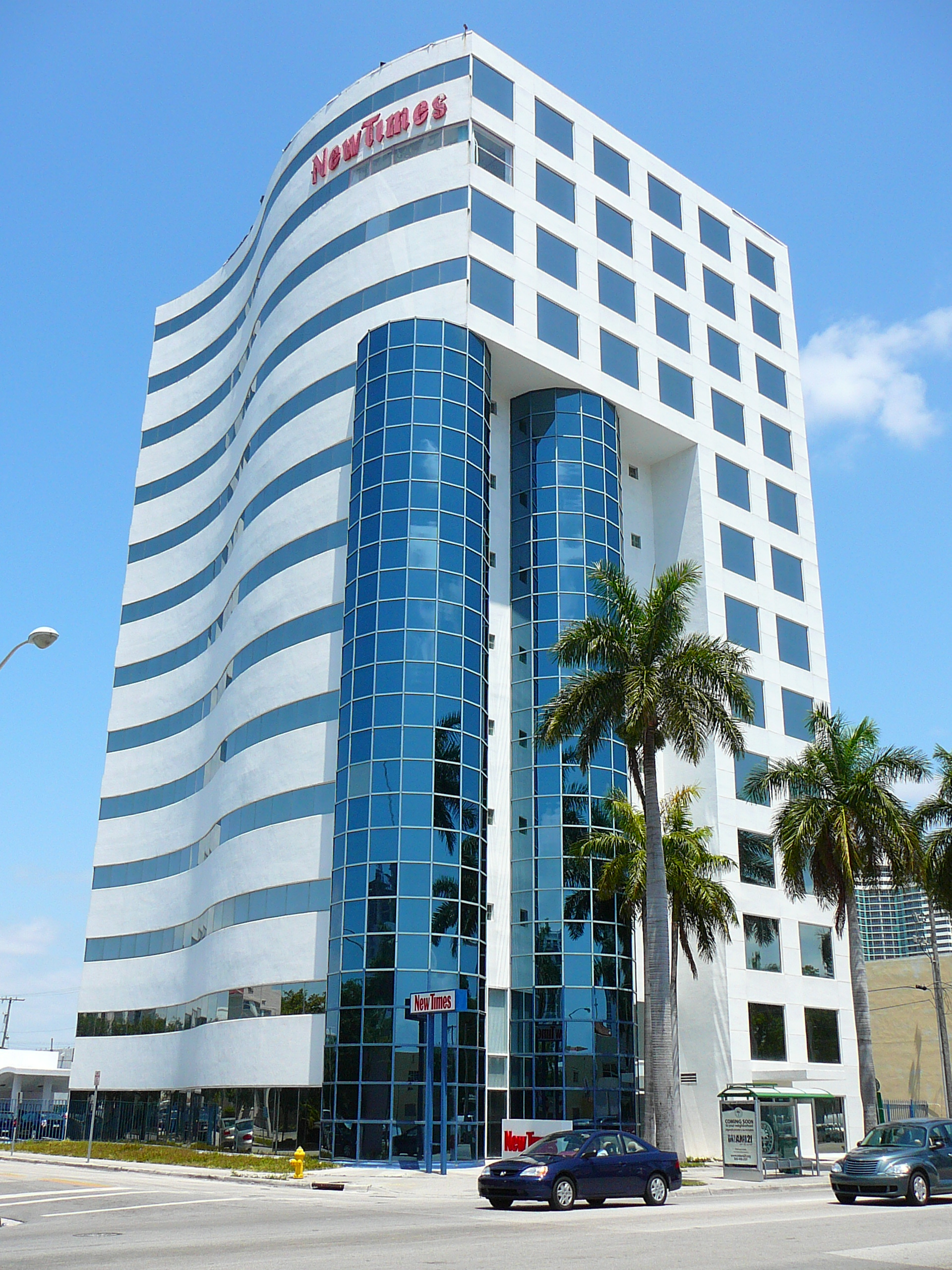
The Miami New Times headquarters in the Edgewater section of Miami

The Miami New Times is a newspaper based in Miami, Florida, with online news coverage and commentary published daily and a print edition distributed weekly. Focusing primarily on local arts and culture, the Miami New Times serves the Miami metropolitan area, and is headquartered in Miami's Wynwood Art District.

== Overview ==
It was acquired by Village Voice Media, then known as New Times Media, in 1987, when it was a fortnightly newspaper called the Wave. The paper has won numerous awards, including a George Polk Award for coverage of the Major League steroid scandal in 2014 and first place in 2008 among weekly papers from the Investigative Reporters and Editors for stories about the Julia Tuttle Causeway sex offender colony. In 2010, the paper garnered international attention when it published a story by Brandon K. Thorp and Penn Bullock which revealed that anti-gay activist George Alan Rekers had hired a male prostitute to accompany him on a trip to Europe.

In 2012, Village Voice Media executives Scott Tobias, Christine Brennan, and Jeff Mars bought Village Voice Media's papers and associated web properties from its founders and formed Voice Media Group.

Author Steve Almond is a former writer for the Miami New Times. Former Two Live Crew rapper Luther Campbell is a columnist for the paper.

In 2020, full-time staff members at the Miami New Times saw their salaries cut by 25 percent due to the COVID-19 pandemic, while several editors and writers were laid off. Voice Media Group also reduced freelance budgets, citing "the current or anticipated decline in revenues." That same year, the New Times reported on similar layoffs at the Miami Herald and El Nuevo Herald.

As of 2025, the Miami New Times relies heavily on freelancers to cover local news.
