= Jack Daugherty =

Jack Daugherty may refer to:

- Jack Daugherty (baseball) (born 1960), Major League Baseball player for seven seasons
- Jack Daugherty (musician), musician and producer for The Carpenters
- Jack Dougherty (actor) (1895–1938) American film actor also known as Daugherty

== See also ==
- John Dougherty (disambiguation)
