= Phoenix New Times =

Newspaper in Phoenix, Arizona

- Type: Media company
- Format: Website / Weekly tabloid
- Owner: Voice Media Group
- Publisher: Kurtis Barton
- Editor: Matt Hennie
- Founded: September 1970; 56 years ago (as New Times)
- Headquarters: 1201 E. Jefferson; Phoenix, Arizona 85034, U.S.
- Circulation: Print: 30,000 (2023)
- ISSN: 0279-3962
- Website: phoenixnewtimes.com

Phoenix New Times is a free digital and print media company based in Phoenix, Arizona. Phoenix New Times publishes daily online coverage of local news, restaurants, music, arts, cannabis, as well as longform narrative journalism. A weekly print issue circulates every Thursday. The company has been owned by Voice Media Group (former owner of the venerated Village Voice) since January 2013, when a group of senior executives bought out the founding owners. Scott Tobias is the CEO of Voice Media Group. Voice Media Group's purchase of the Phoenix New Times did not include Backpages, the online classified site. Matt Hennie was named editor-in-chief of Phoenix New Times in 2022.

== Founding ==
The paper was founded in 1970 by a group of students at Arizona State University, led by Frank Fiore, Karen Lofgren, Michael Lacey, Bruce Stasium, Nick Stupey, Gayle Pyfrom, Hal Smith, and later, Jim Larkin, as a counterculture response to the Kent State shootings in the spring of that year. Gary Brennan played a role in its creation. According to the 20th Anniversary issue of the New Times, published on May 2, 1990, Fiore suggested that the anti-war crowd put out its own paper. The first summer issues were called the Arizona Times and assembled in the staff's La Crescenta apartments across from ASU. The Arizona Times was renamed the New Times as the first college issue went to press in September 1970.

== Arrest controversy ==
In October 2007, Maricopa County sheriff's deputies arrested Lacey and Larkin on charges of revealing secret grand jury information concerning the investigations of the New Times's long-running feud with Maricopa County sheriff Joe Arpaio. In July 2004, the New Times published Arpaio's home address in the context of a story about his real estate dealings, which the County Attorney's office was investigating as a possible crime under Arizona state law. Special prosecutor Dennis Wilenchik served Village Voice Media with a subpoena ordering it to produce "all documents" related to the original real estate article, as well as "all Internet web site traffic information" to a number of articles that mentioned Arpaio. Wilenchik further ordered Village Voice Media to produce the IP addresses of all visitors to the Phoenix New Times website since January 1, 2004, as well as which websites those readers had been to prior to visiting. As an act of "civil disobedience", Lacey and Larkin published the contents of the subpoena on or about October 18, which resulted in their arrests the same day. On the following day, the county attorney dropped the case after declining to pursue charges against the two.

Special prosecutor Dennis Wilenchik's subpoena included a demand for the names of all people who had read the Arpaio story on the newspaper's website. It was the revealing of the subpoena information by the New Times which led to the arrests. Maricopa County Attorney Andrew Thomas dropped the charges less than 24 hours after the two were arrested.

In the weeks following the arrests, members of the Association of Alternative Newsweeklies, of which the Phoenix New Times is a member, provided links on their websites to places where Arpaio's address could be found. This was done to show solidarity with the Phoenix New Times.

In February 2008, the paper filed a formal notice of claim, which is required by Arizona law before suing government officials.

In December 2013, the Maricopa County Board of Supervisors agreed to pay Phoenix New Times founders Michael Lacey and Jim Larkin $3.75 million to settle their false arrest lawsuit against the county defendants.

== Restraining order controversy ==
On April 19, 2023, Senator Wendy Rogers obtained a restraining order against Camryn Sanchez, an Arizona state Senate reporter for the Phoenix New Times. Rogers accused Sanchez of stalking her after seen she had shown up to two of her residences in Tempe and Chandler caught on her ring doorbell footage.

Sanchez began investigating whether Rogers' primary residence was in legislative district 7 after rumors had long circulated that Rogers allegedly did not live in her Flagstaff residence. Rogers had also previously "dismissed" Sanchez after she had asked her a question and was banned from approaching her desk on the Senate floor.

On May 10, 2023, a Flagstaff judge dismissed the restraining order against Sanchez, citing that investigative reporting is a "legitimate purpose" and is protected by the First Amendment.
