= Village Voice Media =

Publisher of weekly alternative newspapers

Village Voice Media Holdings
- Type: Private
- Industry: Publishing
- Genre: Holding Company
- Founded: 1970; 56 years ago (as New Times Inc.)
- Headquarters: 40.7283°N 73.9911°W
- Products: Formerly published alternative newspapers and websites. As of December 2014, it had divested itself of all of these properties

Village Voice Media or VVM is a newspaper company. It began in 1970 as a weekly alternative newspaper in Phoenix, Arizona. The company, founded by Michael Lacey (editor) and Jim Larkin (publisher), was then known as New Times Inc. (NTI) and the publication was named New Times. The company was later renamed New Times Media.

By 2001, the company (NTI) had grown to 13 newspapers in major cities across the United States. Most of these publications were acquired via purchase from the current owner/publishers.

In 2006, with the acquisition of The Village Voice, the company took the name Village Voice Media Holdings.

== Emergence of alternative newspapers ==
Alternative newspapers trace their beginnings to 1955 and the founding of The Village Voice in New York City. Dan Wolf, Ed Fancher, and Norman Mailer together chipped in $10,000 to start the paper. It soon became a unique focal point for a variety of viewpoints and intellectual positions in New York City and beyond.

However, in the late 1960s a new type of journalistic enterprise began to emerge in the United States and elsewhere: the underground newspaper. Fueled by the growth of the anti-war movement, radical politics, the Civil Rights Movement and the counterculture of the 1960s, these publications appeared in virtually every city and large town (especially college towns) in the United States. At one point Newsweek estimated there were more than 500 underground papers with a combined distribution of between 2 million and 4.5 million copies. Among the most prominent were the Berkeley Barb, Los Angeles Free Press ("Freep"), The Rag (Austin) and the Great Speckled Bird (Atlanta).

The Village Voice and Paul Krassner's The Realist— an amalgam of Mad-magazine-style satire and alternative journalism first published in New York City in 1958—are often cited as the main sources of inspiration for underground newspapers. But there were differences. Although the Voice and The Realist had a distinctly liberal bias, they also gave favorable treatment to multiple opinions and put an emphasis on quality writing. Radicalism and activism were not their focus. This was not the case for the underground press. Activism and social and political change was its raison d'être. Journalism and editorial quality took a back seat. That fact, combined with a lack of sound business practices (most were organized as collectives), the end of the Vietnam War, and harassment by the U.S. government, predestined a rather short life for them. By the early 1970s, the majority had ceased publication. A few, grounded in a different publishing philosophy that followed many of the examples set by the Voice and The Realist, survived and formed the beginning of a new alternative press. These included the San Francisco Bay Guardian, The Boston Phoenix and The Georgia Straight (Vancouver).

Another of these survivors was Phoenix New Times in Phoenix.

== History ==
=== Early history ===
The impetus for the creation of Phoenix New Times (New Times) was provided by opposition to United States involvement in the Vietnam War and specifically President Richard Nixon's decision in the spring of 1970 to expand the war and launch an invasion of Cambodia. The spark came from the shooting deaths of four students at Kent State University by National Guardsmen. College campuses across the country erupted into demonstrations and strikes, including Arizona State University in Tempe.

The state's dominant newspaper, The Arizona Republic, published an editorial cartoon by Pulitzer Prizewinner Reg Manning. The cartoon showed "a dirty, longhaired young fellow (labeled "campus terrorist") draped in vines with a torch in one ("arson") and a knife ("deadly assault") in the other. The caption: "Hang ivy on me and call me a student".

The cartoon angered Michael Lacey, the Binghamton, New York-born son of a sailor turned New York City construction worker. Although his father was not college educated, Lacey later recalled, he had insisted that his son read the daily New York Journal-American every day, a habit that bred a lifelong interest in journalism. Lacey had attended Catholic schools in Newark before moving west to attend Arizona State University (ASU). He had already dropped out of school when he and a pair of students, Frank Fiore and Karen Lofgren, felt compelled to report accurately on the campus anti-war protests, which they believed were either being ignored or misrepresented by the ultra-conservative local media led by the Republic. They planned to publish their own paper, which after missing its own first deadline, made its debut on June 9, 1970, as The Arizona Times.

Rechristened New Times, the paper began weekly publication in September 1970. It was neither a hard-core underground publication nor a mainstream journalistic enterprise. It began to develop a unique identity, like a number of other post-underground papers around the country. Over the next two years, New Times explored a variety of social and political issues, both local and national. Revenues crept up, and small successes became beacons of hope. In April 1972 the paper attracted J.C Penney, which ran a series of full-page advertisements. In that same summer, Phoenix native Jim Larkin joined the paper. Part of a blue-collar family that had deep roots in the desert metropolis, Larkin had grown up reading many of the same magazines as Lacey, whose attention he got by sending New Times a detailed written analysis of the city's political and media scene. A fellow college dropout who had attended school in Mexico before returning home, Larkin quickly became the paper's business and sales leader, injecting some practical thinking into its operations. Larkin took a more level-headed approach in part because he had something few of the other New Times staffers did – a spouse and two children to support. After working all day at the paper, "he would drive to the Nantucket Lobster Trap where he worked all night as a waiter."

But in the early days, New Times was not an organization upon which a major newspaper group could be built. The company, which had incorporated as New Times Inc. in October 1971, was internally organized as a collective, mirroring the thinking of a large number of its underground predecessors. This resulted in long bouts of introspection, analysis and debate.

Larkin later recalled:

The paper survived because there were so many people willing to work for nothing or next to nothing because they had a common vision: all that Sixties and early-Seventies bullshit. The anti-war movement was valid, certainly, but there were certain elements of the hippie movement that the paper took advantage of. People would work for nothing because they thought they were part of a great social experiment.

In 1972 the company launched a Tucson edition. It never gained traction for a variety of reasons, including cultural differences between the two Arizona cities, a lack of advertising interest, and an editorial emphasis on Phoenix politics and issues. The Tucson edition was shuttered in 1975, but not before launching the writing career of Ron Shelton, a former minor-league ballplayer who would go on to write and direct the baseball classic movie Bull Durham.

In July 1973 the company, in desperate need of capital, issued a public stock offering for Arizona residents. It raised $38,000, with stock priced at $1 per share. The money was spent in no time, leaving the company in much the same precarious financial position as it was prior to the sale – only now with more than 200 individual shareholders.

In 1974, Larkin was named publisher and president of the company, a move that presaged his future role as CEO of the largest group of alternative newsweeklies in America. By 1975 many of the paper's staffers had begun to leave the company. Low pay and the collective nature of the organization had taken its toll. Lacey left in 1974, followed by Larkin in 1975. Larkin was replaced by Phillip Adams, a shareholder and board member who was also a certified public accountant. Adams and his business partner, Al Senia, also owned the Casa Loma apartments in downtown Tempe, where they headquartered the New Times.

But the Adams era was short-lived. Complaints came from stockholders: A lack of communication from management, a failure to hold any Board of Directors meetings for more than a year, and a loss of focus on local issues. This led the previous leaders of the company including Lacey and Larkin to devise a plan to take back the newspaper. On March 19, 1977, the former leaders staged what came to be known as "the coup." After Adams was voted out by supportive shareholders, they loaded up all of New Times' meager office equipment and supplies from the Tempe offices and transported them to a new location at the Westward Ho Hotel in downtown Phoenix. There the modern New Times company was reborn. Litigation ensued, but within a few months the new management group had prevailed. Larkin became the publisher/president and Lacey soon joined him as editor.

With circulation now at a low point of 17,000 copies, the new managers knew they faced an uphill struggle. Luck was with them. Investigative Reporters and Editors (IRE) was about to release a massive report entitled The Arizona Project that detailed the events surrounding the 1975 murder of Arizona Republic reporter Don Bolles. But the Republic refused to publish the report, claiming it was unfair and improperly investigated. The Bolles murder was a major story in Arizona. The refusal by the Republic meant the residents of Maricopa County would have no place to read the report— except, that is, in the newly re-formed New Times. For weeks the paper ran installments of the IRE investigation. Papers flew off the stands and the paper established a readership foothold in the Valley of the Sun. The IRE report was far from the last time New Times would clash with the Republic. In 1980 the daily and its publisher Duke Tully sued New Times for libel, claiming its coverage of a union dispute at the Republic was inaccurate. While the suit was eventually dismissed, the enmity between the two publications grew. Ultimately Tully was forced to resign as publisher of the Republic after it was revealed that he had falsified his claims he had served as an Air Force fighter pilot in Korea and Vietnam. In fact he had not served in Korea or Vietnam and had never been in the military at all.

Fights with the Republic aside, one of the first important initiatives for New Times was to increase circulation. The paper was distributed free at locations chosen to attract the young readers coveted by advertisers. The Chicago Reader had pioneered free circulation in the early 1970s and Larkin eagerly embraced the concept. By 1984 weekly circulation reached 140,000. The paper also expanded its coverage beyond news and feature stories to include extensive listings, as well as music, food, film and arts coverage that gave it a much wider appeal.

=== Early key personnel ===
With Lacey's stewardship of the paper's journalistic content steaming ahead, he and Larkin seeded the company with key personnel who would form a foundation for future growth. Among the most prominent were:

Bob Boze Bell: Bell began at New Times in 1978 carrying the title of visuals editor. A talented cartoonist and humorist, Bell created the Honkytonk Sue comic strip, which along with hundreds of other two-page satirical drawings appeared in New Times for more than a decade. After a stint as a morning radio personality in the Phoenix area, Bell purchased True West Magazine in 1999 where he remains as owner and publisher.

Jana Bommersbach: Bommersbach, a star reporter for the Arizona Republic, was hired in August 1978. In addition to her duties as managing editor of New Times, she wrote a weekly column in the paper skewering many of the Phoenix area's sacred cows. In 1989 she was named editor of the paper, succeeding Lacey, who became executive editor for the growing group of NTI newspapers. In 1982 the Arizona Press Club awarded her the Virg Hill Newsperson of the Year Award. She later wrote the defining book on infamous Arizona trunk murderess Winnie Ruth Judd—The Trunk Murderess.

Dewey Webb: Webb joined the paper in late 1978 from the Phoenix Gazette and quickly became renowned for his coverage of the quirky and obscure corners of life and culture in Phoenix. His writing and headline creation skills earned him numerous awards over his twenty-plus years at the paper.

Hal Smith: Smith, a marketing student at Arizona State University, joined the sales department in 1979. He soon became advertising director and infused the sales and marketing departments with tools and strategies that drove the exponential growth of the company over the following two decades. Under his leadership revenues grew from $699,000 in 1980 to $9.9 million in 1987, an increase of more than 1300 percent.

Scott Spear: Spear, the former owner of a chain of record stores, joined New Times in 1980 with a mandate to organize the business side of the paper and manage the rapidly growing free-circulation strategy. He later pioneered the NTI voice-personals business and created a freestanding phone company to support it. In later years he was responsible for identifying and pursuing acquisition opportunities and was primarily responsible for the creation of a fully operational national trade Association for Alternative Newsweeklies (AAN).

Lee Newquist: Newquist was hired directly out of college in 1982 as an assistant to Hal Smith. He rose to become publisher ofWestword in 1985, and in 1992 was named publisher of the Dallas Observer. In addition, he handled the duties of executive vice president of operations for the entire company for a number of years. In 2001 he tendered an offer to NTI ownership to purchase the Fort Worth Weekly, which he still owns and operates.

Christine Brennan: Brennan joined New Times as a paste-up and production person in 1980. After moving into an editing job, she went on to oversee coverage in news and arts and help shape the paper's growing reputation as a purveyor of sophisticated cultural criticism. In 1989 she was named managing editor at Westword and in 1993 was named executive managing editor of New Times Media, the number two editorial position in the company, reporting directly to Lacey. Upon the sale of NT/VVM to Voice Media Group she became the executive editor for that new company.

Deborah Laake: Laake was hired as managing editor and staff writer for the paper in 1982. In 1983 she authored "Worm Boys," a short story published in New Times for which she won a special award from the Columbia Journalism School. She is most famous for her book Secret Ceremonies: A Mormon Woman's Secret Diary of Marriage and Beyond. In 1988 she was named the Arizona Press Club's Journalist of the Year. Laake died in February 2000.

Andy Van De Voorde. Hired in 1983 directly out of college at the University of Arizona in Tucson, Van De Voorde began his career as New Times' calendar editor, but quickly moved up in the editorial department. He rose to become music editor and later was named a staff writer. In 1995 he succeeded Brennan as managing editor at Westword and in 1998 moved into corporate management as NTI's executive associate editor, overseeing writer recruitment and hiring for the company. He has continued in that role at Voice Media Group.

=== 1980s: growth and early expansion ===
With sales now growing at an ever-increasing rate, and a redesign completed that converted the paper into a classic tabloid format, Larkin and Lacey began to look toward other opportunities for growth and expansion. Innovative ideas were infused into the company, creating an environment that grew revenues as well as the quality and quantity of the paper's editorial content. The "Best Of" concept was first used in Phoenix in 1979. While a few other alternative newspapers (notably The Real Paper in Boston) had tried this concept, New Times took it to heights previously thought unreachable.

Originally conceived as an insider's guide to the city, "Best Of" was a once-a-year respite from the regular New Times practice of "eviscerating people and displaying their entrails." The first issue, totaled 40 pages—a big jump for the fledgling paper at that time. Later editions were much larger. Smith's sales and marketing skills kicked in; thousands of premiums were custom-made and delivered to potential advertisers followed by sales calls enticing them to run ads in the special issue, as well as in the weeks before and after its publication. Winners received plaques and winners' certificates they could display in their businesses. Advertising campaigns heralding the upcoming "Best Of" issue were purchased, including local radio, television and billboards. It became common for the entire press run of "Best Of" issues to disappear from more than 1,500 distribution points within 24 hours. By June 1984, Best of Phoenix was being printed in two sections and totaled 288 pages.

The company installed a "Best Of" issue in each publication it acquired from 1983 through 2001, and readers began to identify the phrase "Best Of" with those papers, so much so that in 1996 New Times chief legal counsel Steve Watkinson proposed acquiring a trademark for the name "Best of Phoenix" and the other four papers then owned by NTI. In 1997 the United States Patent and Trademark Office granted these trademarks in Phoenix, Denver, Miami, Dallas, and Houston. Ultimately NTI/VVM registered the "Best Of" trademark for 15 of its publications.

The company successfully defended the trademark and fended off attempts by other companies to use the same term. Most notably NTI/VVM won cases in federal court against corporate giants Ticketmaster-Citysearch— then controlled by media mogul Barry Diller— in 2001 and again in 2012 versus Yelp.

Revenues continued to grow throughout the decade in Phoenix and later in Denver and Miami. Phoenix's growth in particular was exponential: Smith's sales and marketing machine transformed the small Phoenix paper of 1979 (about 32 pages on average) to more than 160 pages every week by the middle of the decade. Sales packages were constructed for, and sold to, advertisers small and large. The largest advertisers were offered extremely low rates in exchange for large volume commitments. Over time, the number of ads in each week's edition, rather than gross revenue, became the primary benchmark for measuring growth and success.

In addition to the hundreds of display advertisers appearing in the papers every week, a classified advertising section began to grow. Many of these classified ads were paid. The provocative and humorous nature of many of the ads, combined with the publications' growing circulation, created a vibrant marketplace that was different than daily newspaper classifieds.

One of the long-standing features in the classifieds of New Times and other alternative papers was the personals section. These often-quirky ads did not allow personal contact information to be included.

That changed in the autumn of 1983, when New Times introduced a new category in the classified section that immediately followed the personal ads. It was called "Romance," and from a business perspective it was immediately successful. "Romance" ads were paid for by the word. The advertiser could write a brief description about themselves and the traits they were looking for in a prospective partner. The ad would be assigned a mailbox number. Readers could respond by mailing a written reply to New Times using that mailbox number. The sealed letters would be placed in a pigeonhole (the "mailbox") in the New Times office. Once a week all the letters in a mailbox would be gathered up and mailed to the original advertiser.

A large number of alternative newspapers had similar operations. The seeds for what would later become a gigantic "personals" industry were sown in these pigeonholes.

In 1983 the New Times company made its first newspaper acquisition: Westword, a Denver fortnightly that had been founded by Patricia Calhoun in 1977. Calhoun graduated from Cornell in 1976 and shortly thereafter founded her first paper, The Sandpiper, in New Jersey. A year later she decided to close it and move west to Colorado where Westword was born. New Times purchased the paper from Calhoun and her partners for about $67,000. Shortly thereafter the paper began publishing on a weekly basis. Calhoun remains the paper's editor today.

The early days in Denver were not easy ones for New Times. Westword was acquired at the beginning of the shale oil collapse, which had begun exactly one year earlier with "Black Sunday," the day Exxon announced it was shutting down its Colony Project, a major shale oil production venture on Colorado's Western Slope. Low oil prices prompted other energy companies to follow Exxon's lead and the Colorado economy descended into a severe recession. "See through" buildings in what was once a revitalized downtown Denver became the norm. Thirty- and forty-story skyscrapers constructed in the optimistic heat of the boom were finished just as the collapse happened. They would stand unoccupied for years. It took a number of years for NTI to right the Westword ship; ultimately Westword became one of the twin pillars upon which NTI built its national footprint.

The other pillar, Phoenix New Times, continued to grow throughout the 1980s. Recognizing the need for more office space, the company purchased a historical building near downtown Phoenix, the Booker T. Washington Elementary School. Built in 1926, the school had been the center of the African-American community in Phoenix during decades of segregation, first de jure (Arizona was a Jim Crow state) and then after 1954, de facto. NTI re-furbished the historic structure and today it remains the headquarters of the Phoenix New Times.

Despite its outward success, NTI had difficulty establishing banking relationships for many years. The alternative newspaper model, with no paid circulation, no real tangible assets, and a decidedly outsiders' viewpoint of the power structure of Phoenix, was not seen in a kind light by banking interests. Finally in the summer of 1987, one banker, Gary Driggs, decided to take a chance on the small company and NTI was able to establish adequate borrowing and credit capacity allowing it to buy out all of the 200-plus outstanding stockholders who were left from the ill-fated 1973 public offering. Only Larkin, Lacey and three key managers were left with equity positions after the buyout was completed.

At almost the same time, NTI acquired its third newspaper – The Wave, a small alternative paper that had begun publishing in Miami Beach in 1986. The purchase price was less than $100,000, but the newly acquired credit line, combined with the growing profits at Phoenix New Times, allowed Lacey and Larkin to invest $1.4 million to jump-start the paper.

Key to NTI's Miami strategy was Lacey's hiring of Jim Mullin as editor. Mullin had formerly edited the successful San Diego Reader and was living in Central America, immersing himself in Latin culture, when Lacey called. Mullin went on to lead the paper's journalistic endeavors for almost twenty years, and Miami New Times quickly became a journalistic and commercial success.

=== 1990s: boom times and rapid expansion ===
In 1989 NTI adopted a new revenue-generating tool that would increase profitability many times over, and help fuel rapid expansion in the 1990s.

Pay-per-call applications dated back to as early as 1971. Typically a caller would dial an advertised phone number with a 900 or 976 prefix. The caller would be billed a fixed amount per minute by the phone company. The phone company kept a portion of the revenue with the balance going to the sponsor of the call. There were many pay-per-call services: sports scores, weather forecasts, even dating lines. A new twist was added to this mix in the latter part of the 1980s. It was known as Audiotext, a relatively simple concept that combined a pay-per-call application with sophisticated answering machine technology ("IVR"). A person would call a 900 number and enter the voice mailbox number of the service or person for whom they wished to leave a message. Much like a voice-mail system in typical office environments, the person who owned the mailbox could listen to the recorded message at a later time and respond appropriately.

In 1989 The Boston Phoenix, a large alternative newspaper in Boston, introduced a variation of this system to the alternative press at the group's annual trade convention. It was an instant hit. Personal ads were a mainstay of almost all the papers. Now, readers could respond to print ads by calling a 900 number, punching in the appropriate voice mailbox number included in the print ad, and leaving a message for the advertiser. The advertiser could then listen to the responses and answer those that interested him or her. In this way, electronic matchmaking was born years before most people had heard of the Internet. The Phoenix proposed to handle all aspects of the operation, with the individual papers responsible only for running the advertisements in print each week. The Phoenix and the newspaper would then split the net revenues after the phone company took its cut.

NTI saw even greater opportunity. It purchased its own Audiotext machines and contracted directly with the phone companies, eliminating the middleman and eventually even forming its own telephone company to bypass most of the charges.

The results were stunning. Within two years, the NTI papers were generating Audiotext revenue of more than $2 million per year, almost all of which translated directly into profit. Within four years that number would rise to more than $4 million annually. From 1990 through 2001 when Internet services became dominant in the electronic dating market, Audiotext generated more than $35 million in revenues for NTI. At one point it accounted for 11 percent of the company's total revenue.

By the middle of 1991, the Phoenix and Denver papers were very profitable and Miami was breaking even. Those facts, coupled with the growing revenues from the Audiotext application allowed NTI to embark on a plan to rapidly expand into Top 15 markets across the country. The company enlisted a boutique investment banking firm to assist in constructing this plan.

Larkin also made one more key hire: Jed Brunst joined the company in September 1991 with the title of chief financial officer. Brunst had previously worked for Coopers and Lybrand and later Allied Signal, along with gaining some experience in investment banking. His directive was to professionalize the financial operations of the company, and prepare it to rapidly expand its footprint via acquisitions.

With expertise in banking relationships and financial transactions now in place, NTI's expansion plan proceeded at a rapid pace throughout the 1990s. In late 1991 NTI purchased the Dallas Observer, its most expensive acquisition to date, estimated at about $3 million. Almost at the same time, the smaller of the two daily papers in Dallas, the Dallas Times-Herald, was acquired by the Belo-owned The Dallas Morning News. This allowed the News to drastically increase its advertising rates, as it no longer had any significant competition in the daily newspaper market. This left a much wider gap in pricing between the daily behemoth and the Observer, which was now the second-largest print publication in town. As in Miami four years earlier when the number 2 daily, The Miami News, was shuttered, sales opportunities were greatly increased by this pricing disparity.

Lacey was busy on the editorial side as well. He hired Peter Elkind as the Observer's first editor, a respected journalist who became known for co-authoring the bestseller on the Enron scandal: The Smartest Guys in the Room: The Amazing Rise and Scandalous Fall of Enron. (2003) Other notable alumni of the Observer included Skip Bayless, who became a nationally known sports broadcaster at ESPN and later at Fox Sports, and Laura Miller, who followed her stint as an Observer columnist with election to the Dallas City Council and then to mayor of Dallas.

In early 1993 NTI purchased the 80,000-circulation Houston Press from real estate developer Niel Morgan and his partner Chris Hearne. Once again good timing and fate intervened. In 1995 the Houston Post, the smaller of the two daily papers in Houston, was closed, with its assets being sold to the larger Hearst-owned paper, the Houston Chronicle. Much as in Dallas and Miami, a prime recipient of the orphaned advertising dollars the Chronicle could not consolidate due to its rising prices was the Press.

In 1995 NTI acquired national advertising firm the Ruxton Group from the Chicago Reader. The Reader had formed Ruxton in the early 1980s to sell national advertising for a small number of the largest alternative newsweeklies. These included Phoenix New Times and Westword. Following the purchase of Ruxton, NTI set out to rapidly expand the national advertising footprint of its member papers. It also aggressively pursued other alternative papers to package this market for national advertisers who coveted the desirable demographic the alternatives attracted. By 2002 Ruxton represented 52 major alternative publications.

Also in 1995, NTI purchased SF Weekly from local publisher. Unlike the other markets that NTI had entered, the alternative newsweekly business in the Bay Area was extremely competitive. Leading the pack was The San Francisco Bay Guardian, a 30-year-old, politically powerful weekly owned and operated by Bruce Brugmann. The Guardian's main market area was the city of San Francisco but it also circulated in other areas around the Bay including Oakland, Emeryville and Marin County. There were also alternative weeklies in the East Bay, San Jose, Santa Cruz, Napa Valley, Palo Alto and Marin County. The two daily papers, the morning San Francisco Chronicle and the evening San Francisco Examiner, were both operated under a Joint Operating Agreement as authorized by the Congressionally enacted Newspaper Preservation Act of 1970.

Lacey hired Jack Shafer, former editor of the Washington City Paper, as editor of the paper. Shafer repositioned the Weekly editorially, differentiating it from the crowded alternative weekly field by emphasizing investigative reporting that, unlike The Guardian, didn't hew to a predictable leftist line. Shafer later went on to become one of the nation's preeminent media critics, penning columns for Slate.com, The New York Times Magazine, The Washington Post, the Columbia Journalism Review and The New Republic. He is currently Politico's senior media writer.

One year after acquiring SF Weekly, NTI entered the Los Angeles market. As in San Francisco, there was much competition, with two competing daily papers and multiple alternative newsweeklies including the market-dominant LA Weekly. In an effort to outflank the Weekly, NTI purchased two other alts, the Los Angeles View and the Los Angeles Reader, and combined them into one weekly publication named New Times Los Angeles. The LA venture proved unprofitable throughout its six-year existence and culminated in the sale of the paper to the parent company of LA Weekly as part of a larger transaction in 2002.

In April 1997, a sister publication The Long Island Voice, a free weekly began with a circulation of 50,000. It was closed on January 7, 2000 due to its failure to make a profit. Circulation at that time was 60,000.

In 1997 NTI did something it had not done since Larkin and Lacey launched New Times in Phoenix: start a paper from scratch, this time in South Florida. The company felt that the counties of Broward and Palm Beach, despite being directly adjacent to Miami-Dade County, were demographically and culturally different and could support a different alt-weekly with different content and advertisers. The result was New Times Broward-Palm Beach (NTBPB); the assumption proved correct. NTBPB became profitable and remained so through most of the first decade of the 2000s.

In 1998, NTI ventured into the Midwest. In the summer, Cleveland Scene was acquired from its founder Richard Kabat. The paper had been founded in 1970 as a music publication focused on rock 'n' roll. NTI expanded coverage into areas that matched the journalistic model of its other publications: in-depth reporting and investigations, event listings, food and restaurant reviews, and a fully flushed out classified section. New staff was hired, including editor Pete Kotz, whose approach fit the brawling, working-class ethos of the town.

But Cleveland, like San Francisco and Los Angeles, had competitive forces in alternative publishing already in place, and Scene struggled to make money. This resulted in the 2002 transaction that also involved New Times Los Angeles.

In November 1998 NTI purchased The Riverfront Times (RFT) of St. Louis from Ray Hartmann (editor and publisher) and his partner Mark Vittert. The RFT had grown into one of the largest alternative weeklies in the U.S. with weekly circulation of 100,000 and a healthy annual profit. That success continued under NTI's ownership. As in Cleveland, the company pumped money into the publication and substantially increased the size of the editorial staff. Hartmann and Vittert are still active today as co-owners of St. Louis Magazine. Hartmann is also a television personality on the locally produced PBS show Donnybrook.

In 1999 NTI put the last piece of its Midwest strategy in place by purchasing The Pitch in Kansas City, Missouri. Founded in 1980 by former record store owner Hal Brody, the paper, like Cleveland Scene, began life as a music publication. Over time, Brody expanded its coverage to news, food and arts, and it achieved a dominant position as Kansas City's premier alternative newsweekly. At the time of its purchase, circulation was 100,000 and the paper operated at a profit.

In 2000 NTI consolidated its holdings in the Dallas-Ft. Worth area by purchasing the Fort Worth Weekly. Longtime NTI executive Lee Newquist was named publisher of the paper, which had a circulation of 40,000. Within a year, Newquist struck a deal with Larkin to purchase the paper, a sale that was consummated in mid-2001. Newquist remains owner and publisher of the paper today.

In late 2000 NTI expanded its operations in the Bay Area by negotiating the purchase of the East Bay Express in Oakland from its owners, the Chicago Reader group and local editor/publisher John Raeside. The transaction closed just months before the attacks of 9/11. At the time of the purchase the paper had a circulation of 64,000.

By the end of 2000, the Weekly had sales of more than $10 million and had achieved profitability. That success soon faded as the bursting of the dotcom bubble, sent the Weekly and its competitors into a financial tailspin. Papers began to fail and often were sold. In the case of the Weekly and the Guardian, litigation over who was at fault for the losses ensued.

=== 21st century: 2001 to present ===
The late 1990s saw a huge growth spurt for the NTI publications as it did for most of the alternative newsweeklies in the country and print media in general. The end of the recession of the early 1990s, coupled with the dawning of the Internet era in the middle of the decade, initially brought a bountiful harvest of new revenues. Dotcom advertisers, flush with venture capital money, were spending liberally in the media. A portion of that went to alternative weeklies including the growing NTI chain. Ads ran in print and online as newspapers, including all the NTI publications, began launching websites and selling advertising on the sites. NTI launched its first website in 1995 and within a year had sites up for all of its publications.

The bubble, however, burst in 2000. The stock market took a dive, especially in tech stocks. A recession loomed. The year 2000 would prove to be the apex for NTI's revenue growth. What followed over the next decade was a slow, bumpy decline. Market forces and the increasing power of the Internet slowly began to erode the strength of the alternative press.

There were brief signs of life. In 2000 Alta Communications of Boston purchased a minority stake in NTI, giving the company a much larger war chest to expand its operations.

Despite the best efforts, there were increasing signs that the economic tides had turned. The erosion of market conditions shifted NTI's focus and resources to achieving operational efficiencies. Once known for its generous spending on editorial, NTI was forced to economize.

Expense cuts were made to meet the changing business environment. Publications that were not profitable were carefully scrutinized and a number were sold or shuttered between 2002 and 2011. On Monday, September 10, 2001, the day before the 9/11 terror attacks plunged the American economy into an even more vicious tailspin, NTI announced the first layoffs in its history.

In 2002, in an effort to stanch the bleeding at its paper in Los Angeles, NTI entered into an agreement with Village Voice Media (VVM), a competing chain that published a number of alternative newspapers including The Village Voice, LA Weekly and the Cleveland Free Times. VVM would sell the Free Times to NTI, and NTI would sell New Times LA to VVM. This resulted in the weaker, money-losing paper in each of the two markets being closed by their new owners, a reflection of the two companies' belief that the L.A. and Cleveland markets could simply no longer sustain two competing alt-weeklies. After critics cried foul, the U.S. Department of Justice launched an antitrust investigation. The investigation resulted in a settlement that required the companies to sell off the assets and titles of the Free Times and NTLA to new potential competitors. New owners were found for the Free Times and the assets of New Times LA, but both publications ultimately failed. LA Weekly and Cleveland Scene continue to publish today.

In a January 23, 2003, letter to the editor of The Wall Street Journal, Lacey responded to a commentary it published regarding the L.A.-Cleveland agreement. He called the decision to sell New Times Los Angeles "gut-wrenching," and took exception Larkin and him having been referred to as "wealthy, monopolist bullies" in a headline that accompanied the earlier op-ed. "We weren't just losing money in Los Angeles," Lacey wrote. "We had a failing business that threatened the health of our entire company. And companies that don't pay attention to the bottom line cannot afford to hire good writers and publish the news."

The LA-Cleveland deal was not the last time New Times and VVM would cross paths. By the middle of the decade, the two chains had clearly established themselves as the big dogs in the alt-weekly world. It seemed inevitable that one or the other would need to assert its dominance, and on October 24, 2005, NTI announced a deal to acquire VVM, creating a chain of 17 weeklies with a combined circulation of 1.8 million. In addition to returning the Los Angeles market to the NTI fold via the LA Weekly, the deal also added the iconic Village Voice to the company's roster, along with Seattle Weekly, City Pages in Minneapolis, the Nashville Scene and the OC Weekly in Orange County, California.

In a provocative interview with New York magazine published shortly after the deal was announced, Lacey made it clear he expected the Voice to take on New Times' fighting spirit. "As a journalist, if you don't get up in the morning and say, 'fuck you' to someone, why even do it?" he asked. "Look, a lot of people think I'm a prick. But at least I'm a prick you can understand. I don't sneak up on you. You can see me coming from a long way away. Like the Russian winter."

Just prior to the VVM deal, Larkin installed a new president and chief operating officer to lead the day-to-day business dealings of what was about to become a much larger company. Scott Tobias began his career with New Times in 1993 as a sales representative at Westword. He rose to become advertising director there and in 1999 was named publisher of the company's latest acquisition, The Pitch in Kansas City. He returned to Denver in 2001 to become group publisher overseeing a number of the NTI publications. Tobias' efforts forestalled the steep declines in revenue experienced in the alternative publishing world for a number of years. Ultimately, though, the Great Recession and the Internet took their toll.

By the early 2000s the Internet, particularly the website Craigslist, was destroying the classified advertising business in newspapers nationwide. Classified advertising in daily newspapers as well as weekly alternatives, suburban papers and community papers was all moving to the free advertising model of Craigslist and other smaller websites. In response to this phenomenon, NTI launched a free classified website called backpage.com in 2004. It soon became the second largest online classified site in the U.S.

The site included all the categories found in newspaper classified sections, including those that were unique to, and part of, the First Amendment-driven traditions of most alternative weeklies. These included personals (including adult oriented personal ads), adult services, musicians and "New Age" services.

On September 4, 2010, in response to pressure from a variety of governmental agencies and NGO's, Craigslist removed the adult services category from its U.S. sites. Backpage.com soon became the highest profile website to include this category, although a significant number of other sites (including Craigslist) continued to include adult services ads, though not directly labeled as such, Backpage was then targeted by the same forces that had pursued Craigslist, as it was known that Backpage was facilitating sex trafficking.

NTI/VVM refused to buckle to this pressure. In taking this position, VVM felt that the First Amendment rights implications, coupled with the protections given to interactive computer services in section 230 of the Communications Decency Act of 1996, were paramount. Over the next five years, Backpage won every legal challenge to its right to continue the adult services category on the Backpage site. Backpage also continued to increase its efforts to root out any illegal activity, particularly focusing on the identification of ads that might feature underage victims of human trafficking.

The battle over Backpage was not the only legal headache for NTI/VVM. In October 2004, SF Weekly was sued by its longtime rival, Bruce Brugmann's San Francisco Bay Guardian, for allegedly engaging in a predatory-pricing scheme designed to drive the Guardian out of business. The suit was filed in California state court under a Depression-era statute known as the Unfair Practices Act, which makes it illegal to sell a product below cost if it can be proven that the sale was made with the intent to injure a competitor or "destroy competition." Brugmann, who over the years had made no secret of his wish that Lacey and Larkin would pack their bags and leave town, claimed that the Weekly was undercutting him on price and subsidizing the effort with cash infusions from Phoenix.

It took four years for the suit to come before a jury, in part because of extensive pre-trial motions arguing such points as whether a law that had been written to prevent Safeway from undercutting mom 'n' pop grocery stores on price could realistically be applied to modern-day newspaper advertisements, especially when many of those ads now appeared on the Internet. When the case went to trial in 2008, the two publications savaged each other, both from the witness stand and in withering daily news reports written by NTI/VVM's Andy Van De Voorde for the Weekly and his nemesis at the Guardian, Brugmann lieutenant Tim Redmond.

Weekly attorneys argued that both the Weekly and the Guardian had declining revenues, not because of an illegal pricing conspiracy, but because of negative trends that were buffeting the entire American newspaper industry, including the rise of free classified advertising websites such as Craigslist and the general flow of readers to the web. However, the jury ultimately found in favor of the Guardian and awarded it $6.4 million in damages, an amount that ballooned to $15.6 million after partial trebling. After a lengthy and contentious appeals process, higher courts upheld the judgment, which was later settled for an undisclosed amount.

Not all of NTI/VVM's legal skirmishes had such a grim outcome. One in particular — the arrest of Lacey and Larkin by Maricopa County Sheriff Joe Arpaio for allegedly violating grand-jury secrecy laws — harkened back to the VVM founders' early days bedeviling the power elite of Phoenix. As fate would have it, the case also provided a fitting bookend to Lacey's and Larkin's long careers with the company. After county attorney Andrew Thomas dropped the charges against them, Lacey and Larkin sued Arpaio, Thomas and special prosecutor Dennis Wilenchik for violation of their First Amendment Rights and abuse of power. In 2012 the 9th U.S. Circuit of Appeals ruled there had been no probable cause for the arrests and that the subpoenas were invalid because, despite his claim to the contrary, Wilenchik had never actually consulted a grand jury.

In 2013 Maricopa County settled the case with Lacey and Larkin, paying them $3.75 million. Subsequently, Lacey and Larkin used the money from the settlement to establish the Frontera Foundation to assist the Hispanic community of Phoenix. Arpaio had frequently been accused by New Times and others of racial profiling and unfairly targeting Latinos for detention and arrest. The U.S.Department of Justice investigated the charges, and later filed a civil rights lawsuit against Arpaio and Maricopa County. That lawsuit was settled in July 2015, but the settlement did not bring an end to Arpaio's legal troubles. In August 2016, a federal judge in Phoenix asked the U.S. Attorney's Office to file criminal contempt charges against the sheriff for failing to follow the judge's orders in a separate racial-profiling case.

Not long before their court victory over Arpaio, Lacey's and Larkin's four-decade adventure in alternative journalism came to an end. In 2012, the VVM owners sold the remaining papers and their affiliated web properties to Tobias and a group of other longtime company executives. Executives for the spinoff holding company, Denver-based Voice Media Group ("VMG"), raised "some money from private investors" in order to separate the newspapers.

In December 2014, NTI/VVM, which had held onto Backpage.com after selling the papers to VMG, sold its interest in Backpage to a Dutch holding company.

=== Newspaper properties timeline ===
VILLAGE VOICE MEDIA HOLDINGS fka NEW TIMES MEDIA HOLDINGS fka NEW TIMES INC. Name of Newspaper	Date of acquisition or start up	Date of Sale	Purchaser
Phoenix New Times	1970	2012	Voice Media Group (VMG)
Westword (Denver)	1983	2012	VMG
Miami New Times	1987	2012	VMG
Dallas Observer	1991	2012	VMG
Houston Press	1993	2012	VMG
SF Weekly	1995	2013	San Francisco Media Company/Black Press
Los Angeles Reader	1996	1996	merged into New Times LA
LA View	1996	1996	merged into New Times LA
New Times LA	1996	2002	Village Voice Media Inc.
New Times Broward-Palm Beach	1997	2012	VMG
Cleveland Scene	1998	2008	Times-Shamrock Communications
Riverfront Times (St. Louis)	1998	2012	VMG
The Pitch (Kansas City)	1999	2011	SouthComm Communications
Fort Worth Weekly	2000	2001	Lee Newquist
East Bay Express (SF Bay area)	2001	2007	Stephen Buel/Hal Brody
Nashville Scene	2006	2009	SouthComm Communications
Village Voice (New York)	2006	2012	VMG
LA Weekly	2006	2012	VMG
OC Weekly (Orange County CA)	2006	2012	VMG
City Pages (Minneapolis)	2006	2012	VMG
Seattle Weekly	2006	2013	Sound Publishing/Black Press

== Journalism of New Times and Village Voice Media ==
=== Philosophy of journalism ===
From its inception, NTI/VVM became known for its fiercely independent journalism and its willingness to take on topics and stories that spooked mainstream publishers. The newspapers also became touchstones for local arts and culture, devoting entire sections to the coverage of rock music when most dailies ignored the genre, and investing in sophisticated restaurant criticism at a time when dailies focused primarily on recipes and home cooking tips.

During the 42 years from its founding in 1970 to the sale of the publications in 2012, the company's publications followed a different path than that of daily papers and glossy magazines. The early days of Phoenix New Times were driven editorially by opposition to the Vietnam War. As the company grew, Lacey, the rough–edged editorial boss, demanded reported stories but also expected his reporters to have a voice. In a writers' manual first drafted by Laake and amended by others over the years, reporters were told that, "Objectivity is the Loch Ness monster of journalism. Only a few claim to have seen it, and no one believes them. Your standard in framing stories should be intellectual honesty. A crook is a crook, a liar is a liar, and these are demonstrable things."

That mission statement created the foundation for a deliberate methodology of unfettered, often long-form, journalism. Early on, Lacey demanded editorial independence from the business interests of the paper, and in 1978 the company's board of directors approved an editorial board for Phoenix New Times that gave editors full control of the editorial section of the paper. That separation of editorial and business meant that publishers did not hire or fire editors, an arrangement that was an anomaly in the newspaper industry but which made it easier for Lacey to fulfill his stated desire for entering the industry in the first place: to "... punch a few people in the fucking head."

=== New Times Inc. / Village Voice Media Holdings Awards ===
The publications went on to win a multitude of local and national journalism awards. These included a groundbreaking Pulitzer Prize in 2007 for LA Weekly food writer Jonathan Gold. The company's writers were also finalists for five other Pulitzers.

In addition to the Pulitzer Prize, NTI/VVM writers won some of the most prestigious awards in American journalism: Investigative Reporters and Editors: 39 awards including five winners.

Livingston Awards for Young Journalists: 39 awards including four first-place winners.

Sigma Delta Chi Awards: Ten winners.

James Beard Foundation Journalism Awards: 67 awards including 21 winners.

In the three decades from 1982 until the sale of the company in 2012, NTI/VVM publications and its writers, artists and editors won 1,520 first-place awards in 124 national, regional, state and local journalism contests. They were also finalists for, or nominated for, an additional 2,289 awards.

NTI/VVM writers were named Journalist of the Year in state or local contests 28 times over a thirty-year period. Phoenix New Times writers alone garnered this award from the Arizona Press Club fourteen times in a 29-year span including three times each for Paul Rubin, John Dougherty and Terry Greene.

=== Significant local stories ===
NTI/VVM coverage of local stories was often so impactful as to cause real change and upheaval on a local, regional and even national level. Some of the most outstanding were:

LA Weekly food critic Jonathan Gold Wins First Restaurant-Criticism Pulitzer, April 16, 2007

Jonathan Gold was rewarded in part for expanding the practice of food writing into the dimension of the culinary everyman. Known for his interest in downscale noodle joints and taco carts, he received the first Pulitzer Prize ever awarded to a restaurant critic, an honor that reflected not just his knowledge of food but his love of Los Angeles, whose nooks and crannies were the true star of his stories.

"The People Under the Bridge," Miami New Times, December 13, 2007

While riding his bicycle around Miami, newly hired New Times writing fellow Isaiah Thompson noticed a large group of men congregating under a bridge. The random observation led to a remarkable story that exposed an ugly reality: because of laws restricting where sex offenders can legally live, the State of Florida was sending paroled criminals to live under a viaduct. The story, the first long-form effort of Thompson's career, received first-place in the Investigative Reporters & Editors contest and was chased by national publications including the Washington Post and the New York Times.

"Sheriff Joe's Real Estate Game," Phoenix New Times, July 1, 2004, and "Breathtaking Abuse of the Constitution," Phoenix New Times, October 18, 2007

In Phoenix, these stories were the journalistic equivalent of the shot heard 'round the world, planting the seeds of an imbroglio that eventually led to the arrests of New Times founders Larkin and Lacey. In the first, reporter John Dougherty revealed that controversial Maricopa County Sheriff Joe Arpaio had dumped thousands of dollars of cash into local real estate and had convinced judges to redact property records so thoroughly that members of the public had no way of telling just how a relatively low-paid lawman was getting rich in the world of business. As part of that story, Dougherty published Arpaio's home address online, which was technically illegal even though, as Dougherty reported, the lawman's address was already widely available in various public documents.

As Dougherty and other New Times writers continued to dog the sheriff, Arpaio grew progressively more angry. In 2007, he lashed out by encouraging Maricopa County Attorney Andrew Thomas, and a hand-picked special prosecutor, to issue sweeping grand-jury subpoenas demanding that New Times turn over all of its notes and records about any story written about the sheriff since 2004. Those subpoenas also demanded that the newspaper turn over detailed information about anyone who had visited the paper's website in the past three years, including IP addresses, domain names, which pages the reader had visited on the site, and which websites the readers had visited prior to coming to the New Times site.

Lacey and Larkin responded by publishing a story revealing the existence of the subpoenas, an act that they conceded could be interpreted as a violation of grand-jury secrecy laws. The journalists were arrested later that day by plain-clothes sheriff's deputies driving unmarked cars, and the story exploded in the local press. Although a chagrined Thomas dropped the charges five days later, Lacey and Larkin sued for wrongful arrest, and in 2013 Maricopa County agreed to pay them $3.75 million to settle the case. Thomas was disbarred in 2012, and it was later revealed that the grand jury that was allegedly investigating New Times had, in fact, never been convened.

"The War Within," Westword, January 30, 2003

The sexual abuse of female cadets at the Air Force Academy made national headlines in 2003. The story first appeared in Westword, which detailed how an insular, macho culture at the academy had allowed rape and sexual-harassment cases to proliferate despite the Air Force's half-hearted attempts at reform. This story took first-place in the Investigative Reporters & Editors contest, and also was the centerpiece of a portfolio that won Westword staff writer Julie Jargon the Livingston Award for Young Journalists.

"Fallout," SF Weekly, May 2, 2001

Weekly reporter Lisa Davis received multiple national awards for this story about how nuclear researchers handled – and grossly mishandled – the Cold War's most dangerous radioactive substances at a top-secret lab inside the Hunter's Point Naval Shipyard. It took on added significance because Hunter's Point was the same shipyard the city wanted to remake as San Francisco's newest neighborhood.

=== Parody and satire ===
The NTI/VVM publications also distinguished themselves by pushing the edge of the envelope when it came to pranks, spoofs, and other journalistic hijinks. Encouraged by Lacey, who often told reporters he had enjoyed reading Mad magazine as a child, the papers engaged in a wide range of provocative acts that often sparked as much righteous ire as they did laughter.

In 1990, New Times music editor David Koen posed as a reporter for the Mesa Tribune in order to goad state legislator Jan Brewer, then pushing a law to make it illegal for minors to buy record albums containing offensive lyrics, into reciting particularly profane passages over the phone. New Times taped Brewer, set her performance to a rap beat, and then blasted the recordings over loudspeakers at the state capitol. The paper was widely excoriated by local journalists for the deception, which Koen documented in a story feigning shock at the fact that "Jan Brewer talked dirty to me." (Brewer was later elected Governor of Arizona, and made national headlines when she wagged her finger at President Barack Obama on the tarmac at Sky Harbor Airport.)

NTI/VVM received similar flak in 2003, when Mike Seely of the Riverfront Times in St. Louis wrote a story intended to lampoon the hype surrounding basketball phenomenon LeBron James, who was about to become the NBA's number one draft pick straight out of high school. "Shebron's Truth," for which Seely obtained play-along quotes from real-life talent scouts, purported to tell the tale of a middle-school girl who could already tomahawk dunk over older boys, and at the age of twelve was considering declaring herself eligible for the WNBA. Described as a violin prodigy, a promising young scientist, and a humble advocate for disabled children, the fictional, 6-foot-2 Shebron became a lightning rod for press critics including the St. Louis Journalism Review, which later published a story by the RFT's former managing editor bemoaning the fact that the paper had "published a lie on its cover."

The company's most prominent satirical salvo appeared in the Dallas Observer in 1999, and ultimately went all the way to the Texas Supreme Court. Spurred by the actual jailing of a 13-year-old boy for writing a Halloween essay featuring the shooting of a teacher and fellow students, "Stop the Madness" told readers that the same district attorney and county judge had just jailed a six-year-old girl for writing a book report on the children's classic Where the Wild Things Are. The article alleged that school officials were "alarmed by acts of cannibalism, fanaticism and disorderly conduct" described in the report, and quoted a bailiff as saying, "It's not easy finding cuffs that small." It also included a response from the imaginary six-year-old protagonist: "Like, I'm sure. It's bad enough people think like Salinger and Twain are dangerous, but Sendak? Give me a break, for Christ's sake. Excuse my French."

The judge and county attorney sued for libel, and were victorious in lower courts, until in 2004 the Texas Supreme Court ruled unanimously to grant the Observer summary judgment. In the high court's ruling, Justice Wallace Jefferson noted, "While a reader may initially approach the article as providing straight news, 'Stop the madness' contains such a procession of improbable quotes and unlikely events that a reasonable reader could only conclude that the article was satirical."
