= Mary Perot Nichols =

- Born: October 11, 1926
- Died: May 21, 1996 (aged 69)
- Writing career
- Genre: journalism
- Notable work: The Village Voice

Mary Perot Nichols (October 11, 1926 — May 21, 1996) was an American journalist who lived in and covered New York City. She was a columnist and city editor of The Village Voice, where her work contributed to averting a plan by Robert Moses to put a highway through Greenwich Village. Nichols was first appointed to head the Municipal Broadcasting System (WNYC) in 1978, by Mayor Ed Koch, and went on to serve three tenures leading the media organization, including a stint after the system's name was changed to WNYC in 1989.

== Early life and education ==
Mary Perot was born in York, Pennsylvania on October 11, 1926, and grew up near Philadelphia and in Buffalo, New York. She graduated from Swarthmore College in 1948 with a political science degree.

While living with her husband Robert B. Nichols and their three children — Eliza, Kerstin, and Duncan — in Greenwich Village, she was involved in the community campaign to stop Robert Moses from putting a four-lane highway through Washington Square Park, led by her friend Jane Jacobs. Writing about the potential destruction of the park for The Village Voice led to her being hired as a reporter and columnist for the weekly.

== Career ==
Nichols became a reporter at The Village Voice in the late 1950s. She went on to write the weekly's "Runnin' Scared" column, covering city politics and organized crime.

In The Freaks Came Out to Write: The Definitive History of The Village Voice, the Radical Paper that Changed American Culture, author Tricia Romano quotes Voice co-founder and publisher Ed Fancher on Perot: "She had a great deal to do with destroying the career of Robert Moses because of the highway through the park, but the copy she would bring in to Dan Wolf, he said, was unreadable." Fancher told Nichols' daughter that "my mother's writing saved the Village Voice from going under in about 1958".

Nichols left The Voice for two years to be a public relations aide for the New York City Parks Department, during the first term of Mayor John V. Lindsay, and returned in 1968 as city editor. After The Voice's founders sold the paper in the mid-1970s, a new editor fired Nichols.

In 1978, during his first term as mayor, Ed Koch appointed Nichols as president of the Municipal Broadcasting System (WNYC). Around this time, she created the WNYC Foundation to attract donors amid waning municipal funding for the network. The foundation would go on to purchase WNYC-AM and WNYC-FM from the City of New York in March 1995.

Nichols' third stint leading WNYC lasted from 1983 to 1990, the year that Mayor David N. Dinkins chose a different person to be president and removed her from the role.

WNYC Radio won a 1984 Peabody Award for the program Small Things Considered, which Nichols accepted on behalf of the station.

In 1989, then-President George H.W. Bush declined Nichols' invitation to appear on WNYC.

From 1990 to 1996, Nichols was a visiting professor at the New York University journalism program.

According to author Robert Caro, Mary Perot Nichols played a significant role in providing access to Robert Moses' papers. While writing The Power Broker, [a biography about Robert Moses] Moses had denied Caro access to his personal papers. Nichols contacted him and told him where he could find the carbon copies.

== Death ==
Mary Perot Nichols died at age 69 on May 21,1996 of pancreatic cancer, at the hospice of the Cabrini Green Medical Center in Manhattan.
