= Karen Durbin =

American journalist and critic (1944–2025)

- Born: Karen Lee Durbin; August 28, 1944; Cincinnati, Ohio, U.S.
- Died: April 15, 2025 (aged 80); New York City, U.S.
- Education: Bryn Mawr College
- Occupation(s): Journalist, film critic

Karen Durbin (August 28, 1944 – April 15, 2025) was an American journalist, feminist and film critic. While Durbin is best known for her work with The Village Voice, she wrote and published consistently on film, arts, anti-war, and feminist issues (particularly during the second wave) from the late 1960s until the mid-2010s. In addition to her work with The Voice, Durbin was also known for her contributions as editor and writer for publications such as Mirabella, Mademoiselle, Elle, The New York Times, among others.

== Early life and education ==
Karen Lee Durbin was born August 28, 1944, in Cincinnati, Ohio, to Violet and Charles Durbin. She attended high school in Indianapolis, and went on to study at Bryn Mawr College, where she majored in English. Durbin was first exposed to professional journalism at age 19, as a summer intern for the (now defunct) Indianapolis Times. After graduating in 1966, Durbin moved to New York, and worked as an editorial assistant for The New Yorker. During her time as an editorial assistant, Durbin met her close friend and colleague, Ellen Willis, a founding member of Redstockings feminist collective. Attending Redstockings meetings exposed Durbin to the political ideologies of radical feminism, civil rights and anti-war movements (she would go on to serve on the editorial board for Win Magazine). Prior to Durbin's involvement with The Village Voice, she worked as an Information Officer at New York City's Environmental Protection Agency.

== Career ==
Durbin first began writing for The Village Voice in 1972 with the personal journalism article "Casualties of the Sex War," in which she critiqued the radical feminist movement. The editor of Mademoiselle approached Durbin to cover feminist issues for the women's magazine. Durbin would go on to have her own feminist column at Mademoiselle, "The Intelligent Woman's Guide to Sex." Durbin returned to The Village Voice as a full-time staff writer and assistant editor in 1974, covering a range of feminist issues and film criticism. In 1975, she toured with The Rolling Stones and penned an article about lead singer Mick Jagger. Durbin's 1976 cover story "On Being a Woman Alone" remains one of the publication's most notable personal essays, which she wrote after ending a long-term relationship with Hendrik Hertzberg.

Durbin was a regular contributor to The Voice for several decades, also serving as the paper's Senior Arts Editor from 1979 to 1989. In 1989 she resigned from The Voice and assumed the role of Arts and Entertainment Editor of Mirabella from 1989 until 1994. After this, she returned to The Village Voice as Editor-in-Chief, selected by the paper's publisher, David Schneiderman. She was the second woman to hold the position, following Marianne Partridge. During the 1990s Durbin was also involved with journalism pedagogy, teaching classes at Columbia School of Journalism, and actively taking part in other university affairs, such as panels, committees, and guest lectures. Durbin resigned as editor of Village Voice in 1996, and continued to regularly contribute film and culture criticism for Mirabella, Elle (as the publication's first film critic), and The New York Times Arts section, and was a member of New York Film Critics Circle.

Karen Durbin's papers were donated to the Barnard College Archives and Special Collections in 2018.

== Death ==
Durbin died from complications of dementia in Brooklyn, on April 15, 2025, at the age of 80.
