= Gayle Reaves =

American journalist

Gayle Reaves is an American journalist who won a Pulitzer Prize and a George Polk Award. She was editor of the Fort Worth Weekly, an alternative newspaper serving the Dallas/Fort Worth Metroplex, from October 2001 to March 2015.

== Biography ==
Reaves was an honors graduate of the University of Texas at Austin, earning a bachelor's degree in journalism in 1973.

Before joining the Fort Worth Weekly, Reaves worked as a projects reporter, writer and assistant city editor for The Dallas Morning News. She was also a reporter for the Fort Worth Star-Telegram, Austin American-Statesman, the now-defunct Austin Citizen, and began her career at the Paris (TX) News.

Reaves is a founder and former president of the Association for Women Journalists and past president of the Journalism and Women Symposium.

She is a Texan, resident in Fort Worth.

== Awards ==
Reaves was a Pulitzer finalist in 1989, and she was one member of a team at The Dallas Morning News that won the Pulitzer Prize for International Reporting in 1994, covering "the epidemic of violence against women in many nations". Eleven reporters and five photojournalists created the 14 story-series "Violence Against Women: A Question of Human Rights".

Reaves won, along with fellow Dallas Morning News reporters David Hanners and David McLemore, the 1990 George Polk Award for regional reporting following a series on South Texas drug wars.
