= Robert Camuto =

American journalist and author

Robert V. Camuto (born February 4, 1958) is an American journalist and author specializing in wine culture and epicurean travel writing.

== Biography ==
Camuto was born in New York City. He graduated from the University of Michigan Residential College in Ann Arbor in 1979 and received a master's degree in Journalism from the Columbia University School of Journalism in 1984. His father is footwear designer Vince Camuto. He has lived in France with his wife, Gilda, since 2001. The couple has one son.

== Career Timeline ==
Camuto began working as a freelance writer in San Francisco in 1979, where he wrote about music and culture for newspapers and other publications including the short-lived New Wave magazine Boulevards. After graduating from Columbia, Camuto worked as a reporter and editor in Texas, working for the Dallas Times Herald and the Fort Worth Star-Telegram. In 1996, he founded and published the award-winning alternative newsweekly Fort Worth Weekly. After selling the weekly in 2000 to New Times Media, he moved to France with his French-born wife and their Texas-born son.

Since his move overseas, Camuto has contributed travel and epicurean articles for the Washington Post, Wine Spectator, Food & Wine, Cucina Italiana, Newsday and the Sydney Morning Herald among others. In 2013, Camuto was named a contributing editor at Wine Spectator.

Camuto’s first book, Corkscrewed: Adventures in the New French Wine Country describes a pilgrimage through French wine country and was published in 2008 (University of Nebraska Press) to critical acclaim. The story is of a new generation of French regional winemakers striving to preserve endangered traditions, reconnect with nature, and produce quality wines on what are oftentimes little known terroirs. In 2009 the book was translated into French (Editions Michel Lafon) under the title Un American dans les vignes: Une ode amoureuse a la France de bien vivre and it has won two distinguished literary awards: the 2009 Prix du clos de Vougeot and the 2010 Prix Jean Carmet des Vins de Bourgueil. Camuto’s second book, Palmento: A Sicilian Wine Odyssey is an exploration of Sicily, from its cuisines to its history, mores, culture, and antimafia movement. The narrative is explored through the lens of the winemakers and the wine they create in the region. Published in 2010, the New York Times wine critic Eric Asimov called it a "beautiful, enthralling work."

In 2011, Camuto was hired as the main project contributor for the Michelin Green Guide Sicily(2012).

== Bibliography ==
Corkscrewed: Adventures in the New French Wine Country(University of Nebraska Press, 2008)
Un American dans les vignes: Une ode amoureuse a la France de bien vivre(Editions Michel Lafon, 2009)
Palmento: A Sicilian Wine Odyssey (University of Nebraska Press, 2010)
The Green Guide Sicily (Michelin Travel Publications 2012)
