= Gear (The Village Voice) =

1969 literary work by Richard Goldstein

- Author: Richard Goldstein
- Language: English
- Genre: Sketch Journalism
- Publisher: The Village Voice
- Publication date: 1969
- Publication place: United States
- Media type: Print (Magazine)

Gear is a 1969 character sketch written by Richard Goldstein that was one of a series first appearing in 1966 in The Village Voice, a weekly New York City newspaper started in 1955 that reports news and various subjects in pop culture. Similar to short stories, character sketches in journalism became popular among 1960s writers and in this era focused on providing a realistic "picture of a type of person", but differed in that sketches did not tell stories of particular individuals. Often, sketches served as warm-ups to an actual story, with light tone, mild mood and focus on a single aspect of the character type, "usually in details of status life", such as social or economic status.

== Summary ==
Clothing IS important. Especially if you’ve got braces and bony
fingers and a bump the size of a goddam coconut on your head.
And especially if you’re fourteen. Because—ask anyone.
Fourteen is shit.

Told in third-person point of view, limited to the protagonist, Gear is about a mid- to late-1960s 14-year-old boy named Ronnie. Ronnie wants to be cool and accepted because he is often made fun of by his peers. The kids call him "Railroad Tracks" and "Brooklyn Bridge" for the metal braces in his mouth. He is sketched as funky looking: skinny with acne; curly, balding hair; "bent fingers"; and "a face that looks like the end of a watermelon". At home, he feels unwanted and as though his parents take him for granted. Ronnie lives in vain to become more like those who are popular – those the tone implies he thinks are more desirable and attractive to the world. He buys a pair of bell-bottom pants and has his mother tailor the cuffs to look cool. Thinking the new pants will make him more of a man, he heads out with the assumption that life will be better. The style of clothing Ronnie selects is typical of the style of a 1960s mod, as he is called by the narrator.

== Narrative analysis ==
Although the setting is not specified, one can assume that it is somewhere in the northeastern United States, probably New York City, as the boy's nickname is "Brooklyn Bridge" and his pants were priced in dollars. It is stated in the story that Ronnie takes the bus to Fordham Road, a well known street in the Bronx, hometown of Goldstein. Several literary elements are used to progress the sketch, the most important being symbolism, subtext, point of view, tone and mood. The narrator speaks from a limited, third-person point of view, but is able to illuminate the scene with powerful symbols.

The tone is juvenile and impressionable, as Ronnie imagines himself in the likeness of Brian Jones, a popular, attractive icon of the 1960s hipster, and guitarist for the Rolling Stones, moving like him in the mirror and putting an unlit cigarette in his mouth and a handkerchief in his pants to look cool and feel macho.

Silas Marner is a book Ronnie is reading that is about a weaver, Silas, who is framed for murder by his best friend, William, after stealing from a church and getting arrested. He is then forced to leave his home town to avoid false punishment. William marries the woman with whom Silas was in a relationship. Silas works and saves up everything he earns only to have it stolen by a man named Dunstan. He is lonely and desperate for better fortune and through his lack of inclusion, feels his life is meaningless. When he takes in a child whose drug-using mother died in the snow, his life begins to change. He raises the child, who grows up to become well-respected. The child is discovered to be the illegitimate child of Dunstan's brother. Through saving the child's life and raising her to become successful, Silas is rewarded with a powerful sense of purpose in life.

Silas Marner is symbolic of Ronnie's desire to feel more wanted by others - to feel he has a purpose in life; a mission. Ironically, however, he discards the book under his bed in exchange for watching his turtle eat lettuce, a futile exchange of activity that avails little purpose. Looking into the mirror, he again compares himself to Brian Jones. He puts the bell-bottom pants on – his mother gave him money to buy them the day before as a result of a fight in which he cursed her - and fastens his "boss black boots", "boss" being slang for "cool". His outfit is symbolic of his desire to become more accepted and have a purpose people appreciate, like Brian Jones and the cool "Reign of Terror" kids at the park who get high on glue and smoke cigarettes. They sometimes let him have the model cars with which the glue is included. Again, symbolism reappears as he takes the pants off immediately after thinking about these kids, as if doing so made the outfit subliminally less appealing – like he feels these kids are not really who he wants to be.

Upon taking off the pants and hanging them on the wall, he re-engages his childlike innocence with a fistful of Oreo cookies, a glass of milk and cartoons on TV. As the sketch comes to an end, he puts the clothes back on, symbolizing his new machismo confidence. Then he puts an old, unlit cigarette – symbolizing his desire to look cool, but reservations of "walking the line" – in between his lips and goes out with the assumption his peers will now admire him and he will soon be "getting laid".
