= San Francisco Bay Guardian =

Former American newspaper

- Type: Alternative weekly
- Format: Tabloid
- Owner: San Francisco Newspaper Company LLC
- Publisher: Marke Bieschke
- Editor: Steven T. Jones
- Founded: 1966
- Ceased publication: October 14, 2014
- Language: English
- Headquarters: 135 Mississippi St. San Francisco, California 94107
- Circulation: 106,708
- Price: Free
- ISSN: 0036-4096
- Website: sfbg.com

The San Francisco Bay Guardian was a free alternative newspaper published weekly in San Francisco, California. The paper was shut down on October 14, 2014. Parts of the paper were relaunched online in February 2016. The news website 48 Hills, founded in 2013 by longtime editor Tim Redmond and publisher Marke Bieschke, acts as a successor to the alt-weekly and digitally hosts its archives.

== History ==
The Bay Guardian was founded in 1966 by Bruce B. Brugmann and his wife, Jean Dibble. It was known for reporting, celebrating, and promoting left-wing and progressive issues within San Francisco and (albeit rarely) around the San Francisco Bay Area as a whole. This usually included muckraking, legislation to control and limit gentrification, and endorsement of political candidates and other laws and policies that fall within its political views. The Bay Guardian handed out "Goldie Awards" annually for excellence in the arts and similar areas.

It also printed movie and music reviews, an annual nude beaches issue, and an annual sex issue. The Bay Guardian was one of several alternative newspapers in the greater San Francisco Bay Area, including SF Weekly (formerly its major competitor, now under the same ownership), East Bay Express, Metro Silicon Valley, North Bay Bohemian, Marin's Pacific Sun, and Berkeley Daily Planet.

In 1971, it published The Ultimate Highrise, on the costs of development to the city. In 1975, it published San Francisco Free & Easy: The Native's Guidebook with a revised edition in 1980, edited by William Ristow.

=== 1970s unionization attempt ===
The Bay Guardian put down an attempt by its employees to unionize in the 1970s. In 1975, Bay Guardian staffers, with the aid of Newspaper Guild Local 52 and International Typographical Union Local 21, signed union cards to seek higher wages and benefits. The paper had previously won a legal settlement and moved to a new building. Nevertheless, publisher Bruce Brugmann claimed there were not enough funds to increase pay or benefits. The day after Thanksgiving, he fired five senior staffers who had helped organize the union effort. Newspaper staffers voted to join the Newspaper Guild and, on June 15, 1976, they called a strike to force Brugmann to offer a labor contract. Brugmann retained a few management staff and hired strikebreaker replacements. In August, César Chávez offered to mediate the strike, but Brugmann refused. Finally, in 1977, another election was called, but this time votes by replacement workers carried the day and the new staff voted not to join a union.

=== Best of the Bay ===
Starting in 1974, the Bay Guardian published an annual "Best of The Bay" issue that listed the best restaurants, business, and activities in the Bay Area, based on a readers' poll and staff recommendations. The Bay Guardian claimed that its "Best Of" issue was the first annual guide of its kind and was copied by other publications.

=== Lawsuit against SF Weekly ===
In March 2008, the Bay Guardian won a predatory pricing lawsuit against its local rival, SF Weekly, based on allegations that SF Weekly undercut the Bay Guardian by selling display advertisements below cost while supporting itself on cash infusions from its parent, Village Voice Media, in an effort to force the Bay Guardian into bankruptcy. In May 2008 the judge in the case awarded punitive damages, raising the jury's $6.3 million award to $15.9 million, and issuing an injunction prohibiting the SF Weekly from selling advertisements below cost.

=== Sale ===
On April 19, 2012, the East Bay Express reported that the Canadian owners of The San Francisco Examiner were in negotiations with the Bay Guardian to buy the newspaper. These rumors were initially denied by its executive editor Tim Redmond, but the sale went through a week later.

On January 15, 2013, their longstanding rival SF Weekly was sold to the San Francisco Newspaper Group, which publishes the Bay Guardian.

=== Shutdown and aftermath ===
In mid-June 2013, San Francisco Business Times and other publications reported that Tim Redmond had "been ousted" as publisher and editor. The Bay Guardian issued a statement quoting new publisher Stephen Buel as saying, "The Guardian has been losing money, and we were forced to contemplate some editorial layoffs. Tim decided to resign rather than follow through with what we were discussing." However, Redmond denied resigning.

On October 14, 2014, publisher Glenn Zuehls announced that the San Francisco Media Co., which also owns SF Weekly, had decided to close the publication. The 40th annual Best of the Bay issue, published on the same day, was the weekly publication's final issue.

Following the Bay Guardian's closure, its laid-off staff launched the Bay Guardian-in-Exile Project, which included a fundraising campaign on Indiegogo that raised more than $25,000 to help preserve the paper's archives and produce a final commemorative edition of the Bay Guardian, which was released on Jan. 22, 2015 and distributed in conjunction with the San Francisco Public Press and Gum Road.

In October 2015, the Bay Guardian's print and digital archives were handed over to the San Francisco Center for Newspaper Preservation, a newly founded nonprofit organization led by Marke Bieschke (the paper's former publisher) and Tim Redmond. In January 2016, they announced that a "Bring Back the Bay Guardian" crowdfunding campaign and other donations had yielded enough funds to secure the archives and relaunch several Bay Guardian features, included "Best of the Bay".

== 48 Hills ==
With former Bay Guardian publisher Marke Bieschke, former executive editor Redmond founded 48 Hills, a separate nonprofit news site focusing on San Francisco politics and culture that Redmond founded in 2014 after leaving the Bay Guardian. The news organization has been called a successor to the Bay Guardian, based on both its posture and its personnel. It also hosts the archives to the Bay Guardian on its website, in association with Rainbow Grocery Cooperative.
