= 4knots =

Music festival in New York City

4knots Music Festivall
- Genre: Indie rock
- Dates: June 29, 2013
- Locations: South Street Seaport, New York City, United States
- Years active: 2011–2016
- Website: Official Website

Village Voice 4knots Music Festival (commonly known as 4knots), was a free, family friendly, one day music festival held in New York City. Launched in 2011, the festival featured indie rock artists. It was produced by the weekly paper and news site, the Village Voice. The festival replaced the Village Voice's former festival, the Siren Music Festival.

== History ==
4knots 2011, the first year of the festival, was held on July 16, 2011 on Governors Island at South Street Seaport. The one-day lineup featured Mr. Dream, Eleanor Friedberger, Oberhofer, Davila 666, Titus Andronicus, and the Black Angels. Reviews for the 2011 festival were mediocre, with Stereogum saying "the respectable bill proved to be a good way to console yourself about not being at Pitchfork Fest in Chicago."

4knots 2012, the second year of the festival, was held on July 14, 2012 at South Street Seaport in New York City. The festival lineup included Archers of Loaf, Bleached, Crocodiles, Delicate Steve, Devin, Doldrums, Hospitality, Nick Waterhouse, Team Spirit and The Drums. During the concert a fire broke out, interrupting the show for brief period of time. Reviews of the 2012 festival improved from the year before."

4knots 2013 was once more held at the South Street Seaport, which had recently been restored after damage from Hurricane Sandy. The festival included performers Kurt Vile and the Violators, The Men, Parquet Courts, White Lung, Marnie Stern, Hunters, Reigning Sound, The Babies, Fat Tony, Heliotropes, and Steve Guns. The reviews were mixed.

In 2014, the festival was once more held at the South Street Seaport, in Webster Hall. In 2015, the festival was moved to Pier 84 at Hudson River Park. For the first time, the festival organizers charged admission to the festival.
