= Lynn Yaeger =

American journalist

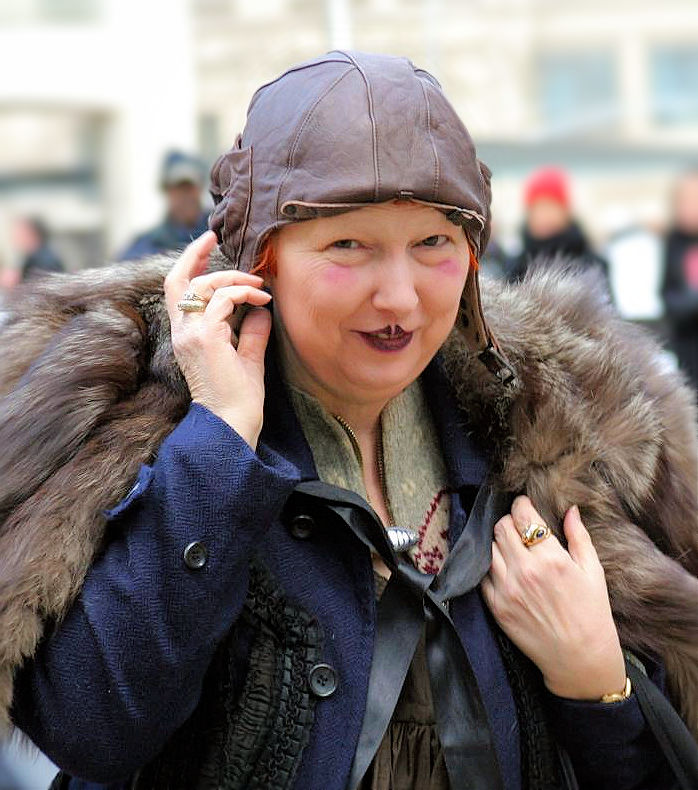
- Yaeger in 2013
- Born: New York City, U.S.
- Occupations: Contributing fashion editor and columnist
- Website: www.vogue.com/contributor/lynn-yaeger

Lynn Yaeger is an American journalist who works as contributing fashion editor to Vogue and Vogue.com. She worked for The Village Voice for thirty years and was known for her fashion column "Elements of Style" which was renamed "Frock Star" in 2007. Yaeger has regularly contributed to publications including The New York Times, The New Yorker, and The Atlantic. Yaeger was also a fashion columnist for Full Frontal Fashion and the curator for the vintage section of fashion retail website yoox.com.

== Early life and education ==
Lynn Yaeger was born in New York City and grew up on Long Island, which she hated —"the only good thing about it is that it is fairly near NYC," she said. She enrolled at Fordham University and initially studied sociology before switching to art history. She was fired from her job at the campus bookstore. She attended a graduate program at The New School in political economy.

== Career ==
As a graduate student, Yaeger used her student loan to buy six expensive French dresses. The splurge caused her to run out of money so she took a part-time job doing customer service for The Village Voice's advertising department. While she was there, she submitted pieces to the paper. Her second article caught the attention of Cosmopolitan editor-in-chief Helen Gurley Brown, who called The Village Voice and asked to buy the piece. Yaeger remained at The Village Voice for thirty years covering fashion, including fashion shows, until she was laid off on December 30, 2008. Shortly after her departure, New York magazine asked her to cover fashion shows. She later joined Vogue as a contributing editor to Vogue magazine and Vogue.com.

=== Awards ===
In 2008, Yaeger won first place in the National Society of Newspaper Columnists' category of humor writing for newspapers with more than 100,000 circulation. In 2019 the Council of Fashion Designers of America (CFDA) awarded her the Media Award in Honor of Eugenia Sheppard.

== Personal life ==
Lynn Yaeger lives in the West Village. She is known for her eccentric clothing style, dark cupid's-bow lipstick, and self-cut hair. She is a Japanophile and an avid collector of antiques and rare items, such as the original Raggedy Ann dolls. In an interview with PAPER magazine, fashion designer Marc Jacobs said that Yaeger was one of his muses and her style has been noted to influenced other fashion designers including Undercover, Alexander Wang, and Chloé. Yaeger is friends with Michael Musto from the Village Voice, but said that she was "terrified" of him prior to becoming friends. She also described Mickey Boardman as "the most fun" who "never said a bad word about anyone." She describe Paper magazine as "kind of the bible of downtown cool" with editors "who were friendlier"; "it felt like they got me, especially Mickey."
