= Siren Music Festival =

Outdoor concert in New York City (2001–10)

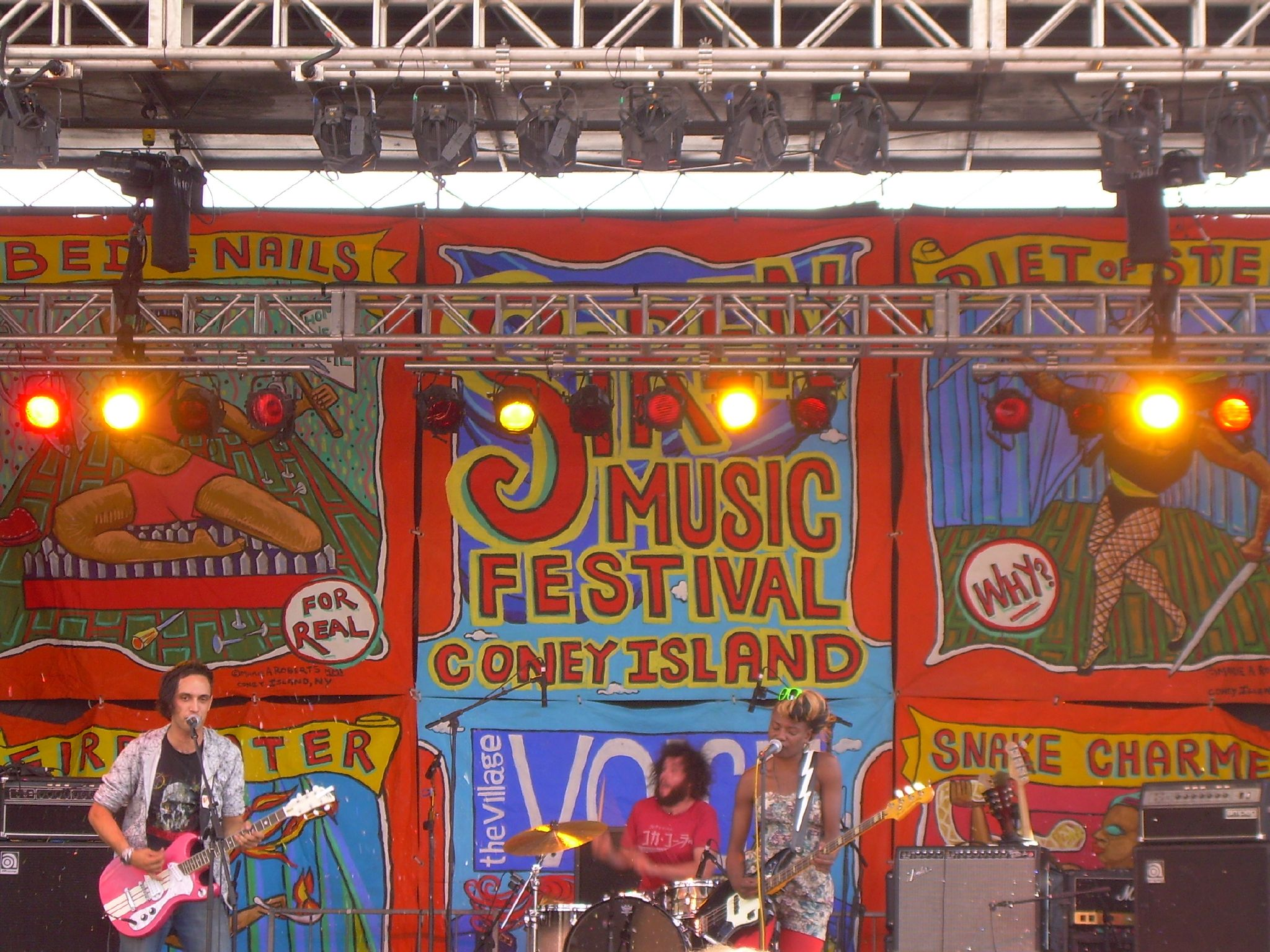
Noisettes at Siren Music Festival, 2007

The Siren Music Festival (a.k.a. Sirenfest) was an annual summertime outdoors concert held in Brooklyn's Coney Island from 2001-2010. It was run by the free arts/politics/current-events newspaper The Village Voice, and was completely free-of-charge. The event drew fans of the indie and experimental rock that comprised the bulk of Sirenfest's performers, as the concert itself was held in high esteem for its high-quality sound and performances and for being free of charge. Self-titled the "premier outdoor indie rock festival," the 2005 event drew upwards of 100,000 fans.

The layout usually involved the Main Stage and the Stillwell Stage, placed two blocks apart, upon which performances could go on simultaneously. Performance times were often staggered to allow the audience to move from one set to the next. The event could be considered a showcase for up-and-coming artists, but there were usually at least a handful of "big names" and seasoned musicians that performed as well. Sirenfest had traditionally always been on a Saturday and usually began in the early afternoon or late morning and continued well into the evening. The event was sponsored by many large corporations and publications who in return sought exposure with giveaways, handouts and literature at the festival. After a 10-year run, the event was discontinued and replaced by the 4knots Music Festival at South Street Seaport.

== Line-ups ==
Bands listed in order of performance.

=== 2001 ===
Date: Saturday, July 21

Main Stage: Enon, Peaches, Rainer Maria, Quasi, Man or Astro-Man?, Superchunk, Guided By Voices, The Jon Spencer Blues Explosion

Puzzles Bar: Sxip Shirey, Jazz Beard Jr., The Tim Heidecker Masterpiece, The Lounge-O-Leers, The Incredible Moses Leroy

Sideshows by the Seashore: Carol Lipnik and Spookarama, The Black Heart Procession

=== 2002 ===
Date: Saturday, July 20

Main Stage: Bob Log III, The Von Bondies, Les Savy Fav, Yeah Yeah Yeahs, The Shins, Modest Mouse, The Donnas, Sleater-Kinney

Stillwell Stage: Rye Coalition, Pretty Girls Make Graves, Shannon Wright, Cirque De Siren, Liars, Mooney Suzuki

=== 2003 ===
Date: Saturday, July 19

Main Stage: The Pattern, The Kills, !!!, Sahara Hotnights, Hot Hot Heat, The Datsuns, Modest Mouse

Stillwell Stage: The Witnesses, Oneida, The Dirtbombs, Northern State, Ted Leo and the Pharmacists, Radio 4, Idlewild

=== 2004 ===
Date: Saturday, July 17

Main Stage: The Ponys, The Fiery Furnaces, Vue, TV on the Radio, Har Mar Superstar, Blonde Redhead, Death Cab for Cutie

Stillwell Stage: Your Enemies Friends, The Thermals, Constantines, The Fever, Electric Six, Mission of Burma, ...And You Will Know Us By The Trail Of Dead

=== 2005 ===
Date: Saturday, July 16

Main Stage: Detachment Kit, Ambulance LTD, The Dears, Q And Not U, Dungen, Brendan Benson, Spoon

Stillwell Stage: Nine Black Alps, Be Your Own Pet, Morningwood, Diamond Nights, Saul Williams, VHS Or Beta, Mates of State

=== 2006 ===
Date: Saturday, July 15

Main Stage: Deadboy and the Elephantmen, The Rogers Sisters, Celebration, Tapes 'n Tapes, The Stills, She Wants Revenge, Scissor Sisters

Stillwell Stage: Priestess, Man Man, Dirty on Purpose, Serena Maneesh, The Cribs, Art Brut, Stars

=== 2007 ===
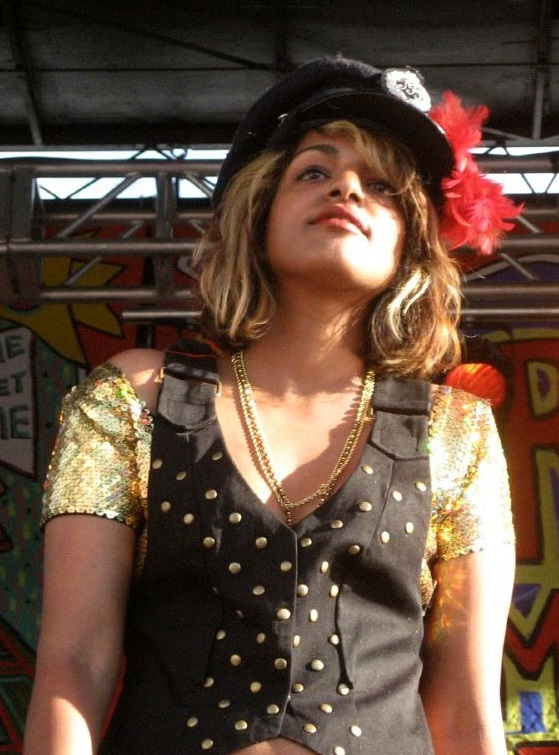
M.I.A. on stage in 2007

Date: Saturday, July 21

Main Stage: The Twilight Sad, Dr. Dog, Noisettes, The Black Lips, We Are Scientists, M.I.A., New York Dolls

Stillwell Stage: White Rabbits, Elvis Perkins in Dearland, The Detroit Cobras, Lavender Diamond, Matt & Kim, Voxtrot, Cursive

=== 2008 ===
Date: Saturday, July 19

Main Stage: Dragons of Zynth, Parts & Labor, The Dodos, Times New Viking, Ra Ra Riot, Islands, Stephen Malkmus and the Jicks

Stillwell Stage: These Are Powers, Film School, Annuals, Jaguar Love, Beach House, The Helio Sequence, Broken Social Scene

=== 2009 ===
Date: Saturday, July 18

Main Stage: Tiny Masters of Today, Micachu and the Shapes, Japandroids, Frightened Rabbit, Grand Duchy, The Raveonettes, Built to Spill

Stillwell Stage: The Blue Van, Bear Hands, Thee Oh Sees, Future of the Left, A Place to Bury Strangers, Monotonix, Spank Rock

=== 2010 ===
Date: Saturday, July 17

Main Stage: Dom, Screaming Females, Surfer Blood, The Night Marchers, The Pains of Being Pure at Heart, Ted Leo and the Pharmacists, Matt & Kim

Stillwell Stage: Apache Beat, Wye Oak, Ponytail, Earl Greyhound, Harlem, Cymbals Eat Guitars, Holy Fuck
