= Richard Goldstein (writer, born 1944) =

American writer, journalist and editor

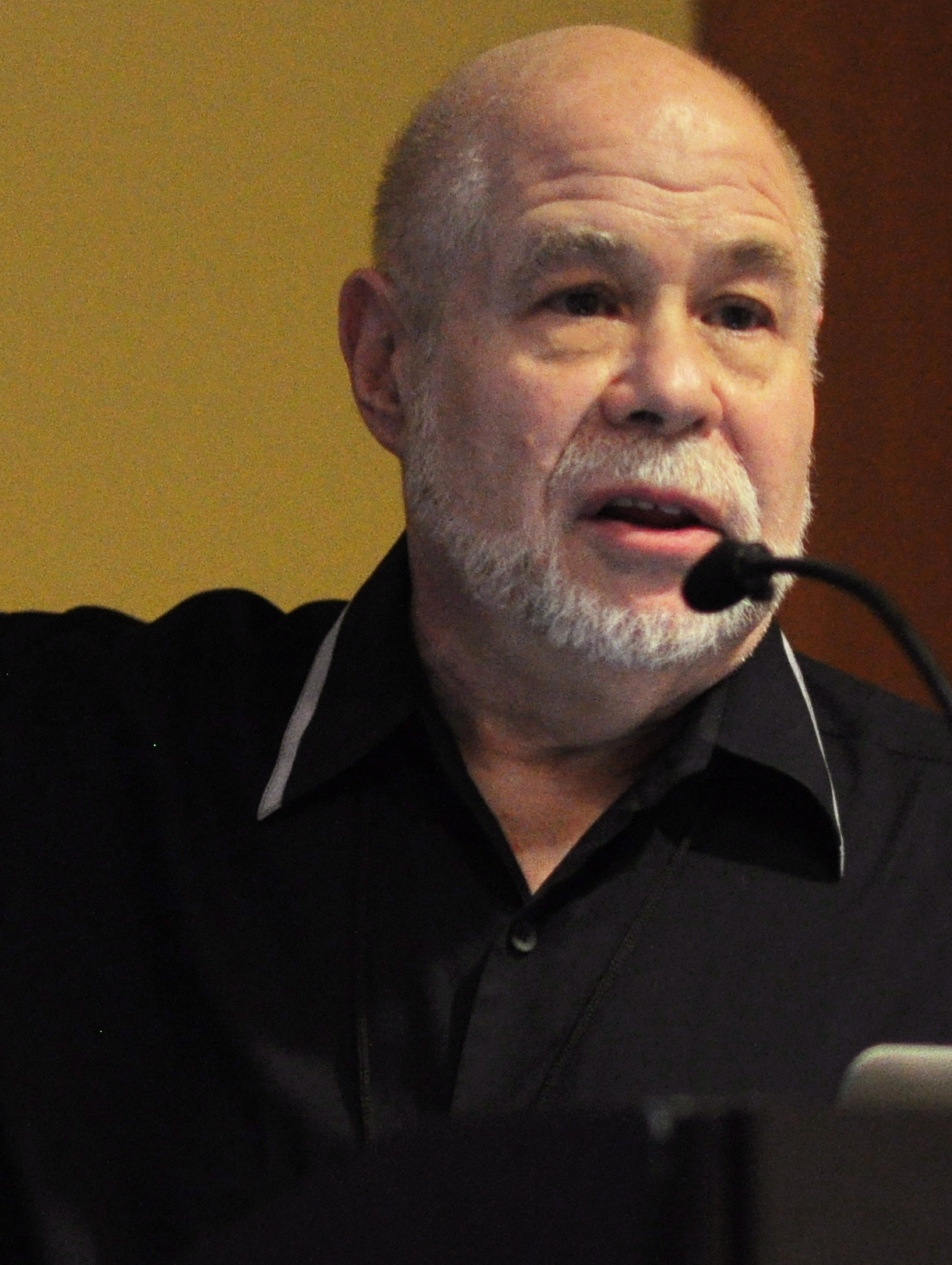
Goldstein at the 2015 EMP Pop Conference

Richard Goldstein (born June 19, 1944) is an American journalist and writer. He wrote for The Village Voice from June 1966 until 2004, eventually becoming executive editor. He specializes in gay and lesbian issues, music, and counterculture topics.

== Works ==
- 1 in 7: Drugs on Campus (1966)
- Words, words, words on Pop censorship (1966)
- Richard Goldstein's The Poetry of Rock (1969)
- US #1: A Paperback Magazine (1969)
- US #2: Back to School Issue (1969)
- US #3: The Roots of Underground Culture (1970)
- Goldstein's Greatest Hits: A book mostly about rock 'n' roll (1970)
- Reporting the Counterculture (Media and Popular Culture: 5) (1989)
- South Bronx Hall of Fame: Sculpture by John Ahearn and Rigoberto Torres (1992), with Michael Ventura
- Born on the Street Graffiti
- The Attack Queers: Liberal Society and the Gay Right (2002)
- Homocons: The Rise of the Gay Right (2003)
- Another little piece of my heart: my life of rock and revolution in the '60s (2016)

== See also ==
- Gear
