= David Schneiderman =

American publisher (1947–2025)

David Schneiderman (April 14, 1947 – January 17, 2025) was an American newspaper editor and publisher. He was the editor and publisher of The Village Voice. Schneiderman died from pneumonia on January 17, 2025, at the age of 77. The older brother of New York Attorney General Eric Schneiderman, he became publisher as well under the ownership of Leonard N. Stern and continued as variously editor-in-chief, publisher, both, or CEO to whom they reported until ending his career there as chairman of Village Voice Media after the merger with New Times Media and moving to the West Coast.
