= The Dallas Morning News =

Daily newspaper serving Dallas, Texas, US

- Front page of the October 8, 2026 issue
- Type: Daily newspaper
- Format: Broadsheet
- Owner: Hearst Communications
- Founder: Alfred Horatio Belo
- President: Grant Moise
- Editor: Colleen McCain Nelson
- Managing editor: Amy Hollyfield
- News editor: Steve Bruss
- Founded: October 1, 1885; 141 years ago
- Language: English
- Headquarters: 1954 Commerce Street; Dallas, Texas 75201
- Country: United States
- Circulation: 39,500 Average print circulation 63,000 digital-only (as of 2023)
- ISSN: 1553-846X
- OCLC number: 1035116631
- Website: dallasnews.com

The Dallas Morning News is a daily newspaper serving the Dallas–Fort Worth area of Texas, with an average print circulation in 2025 of 39,500. It was founded on October 1, 1885, by Alfred Horatio Belo as a satellite publication of the Galveston Daily News, of Galveston, Texas. Historically, and to the present day, it is the most prominent newspaper in Dallas.

Throughout the 1990s and as recently as 2010, the paper has won nine Pulitzer Prizes for reporting and photography, George Polk Awards for education reporting and regional reporting, and an Overseas Press Club award for photography. Its headquarters is in downtown Dallas.

== History ==
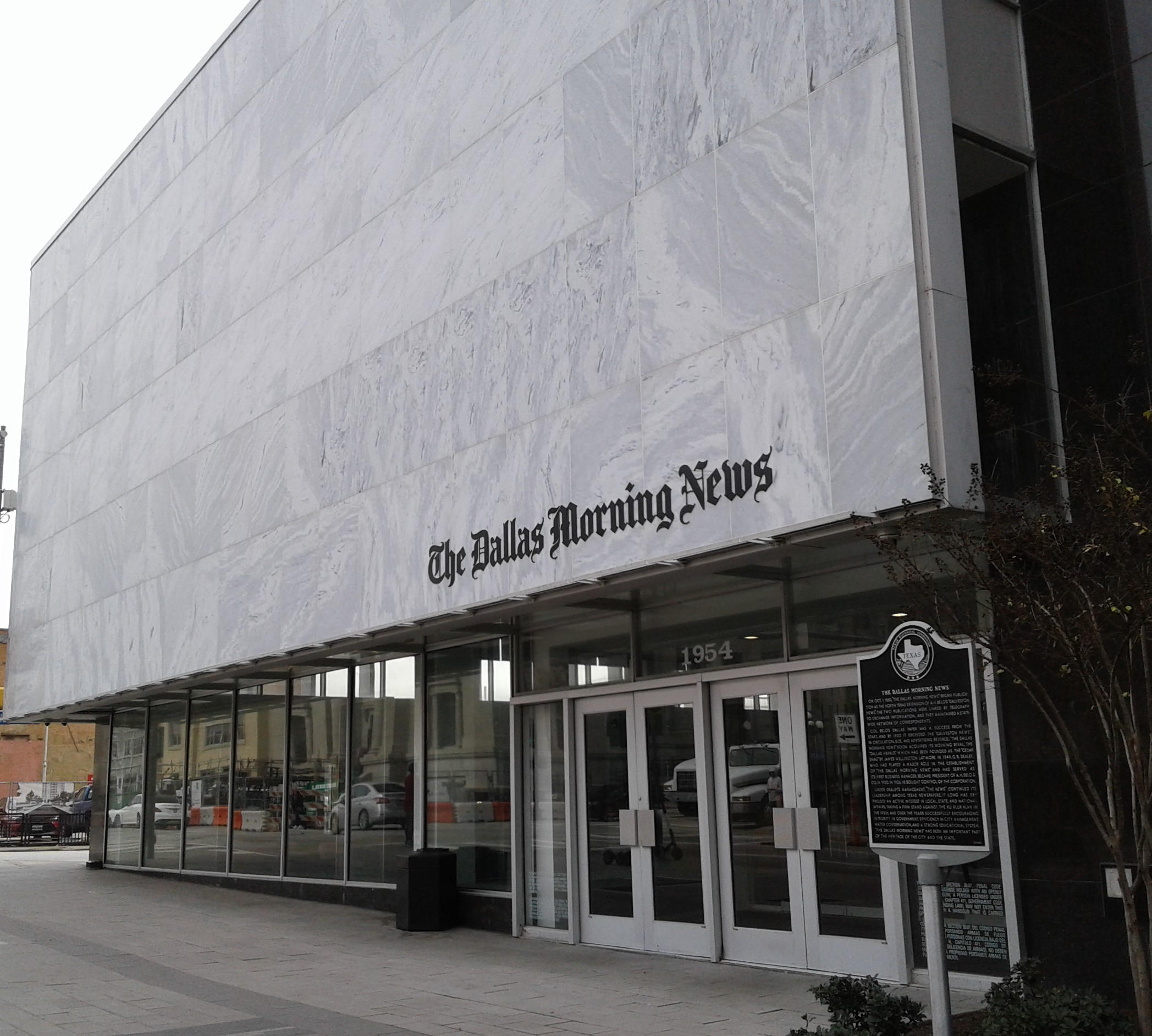
The newspaper's offices in 2018

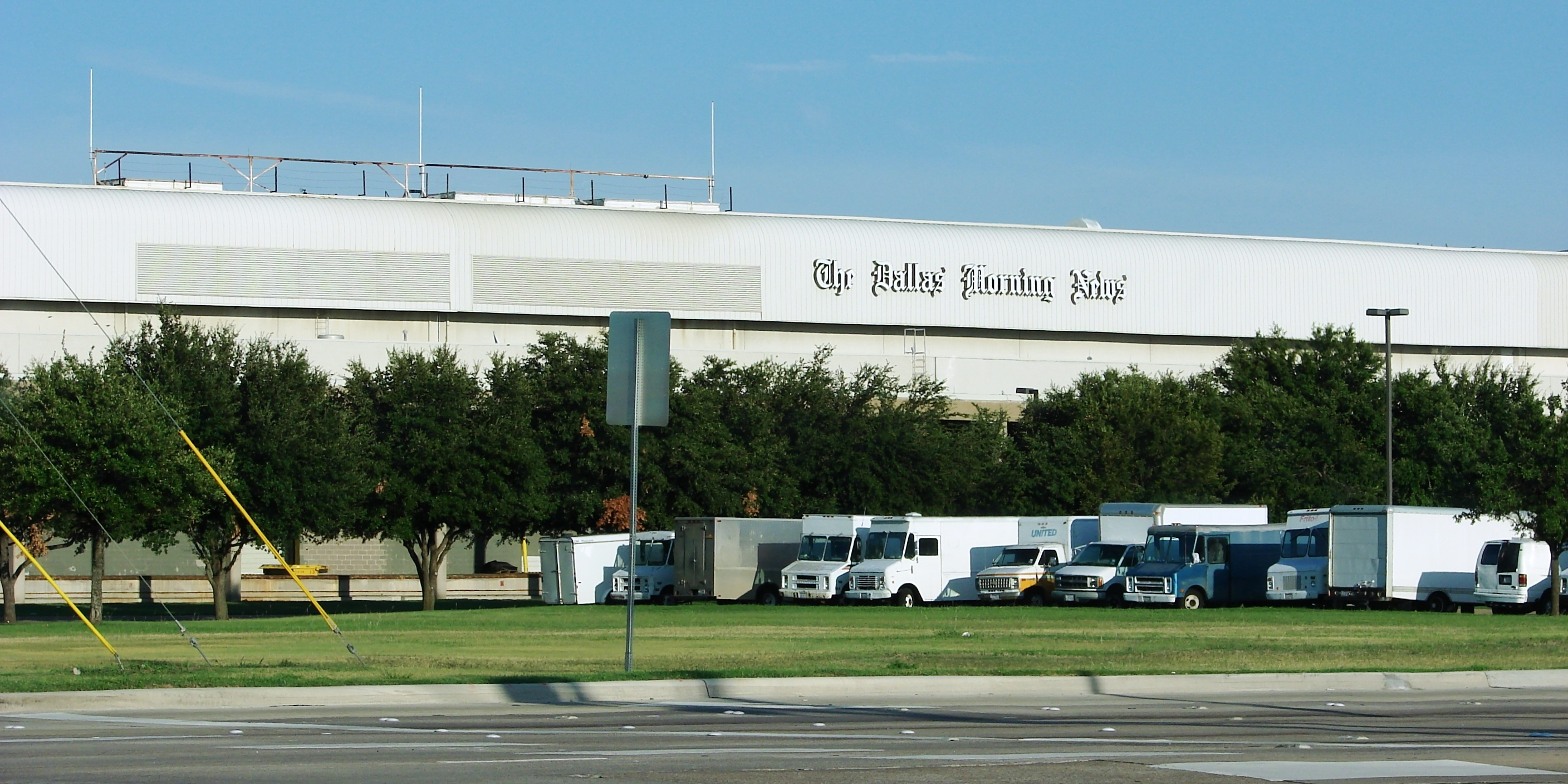
The Dallas Morning News main printing plant and distribution center in Plano, Texas

The Dallas Morning News was founded in 1885 as a spin-off of the Galveston Daily News by Alfred Horatio Belo. In 1926, the Belo family sold a majority interest in the paper to its longtime publisher, George Dealey. By the 1920s, The Dallas Morning News had grown larger than the Galveston Daily News and had become a progressive force in Dallas and Texas. Adolph Ochs, who saved The New York Times from bankruptcy in 1896 and made the newspaper into one of the country's most respected, said in 1924 that he had been strongly influenced by The Dallas Morning News.

During the 1920s, when the Ku Klux Klan was a powerful force in Dallas, The Dallas Morning News pushed back against the KKK with its news coverage and editorials. In turn, the KKK, which had a membership that included one in three eligible Dallas men, threatened to boycott the newspaper.

In 1904, The Dallas Morning News began publishing the Texas Almanac, which had previously been published intermittently during the 1800s by the Galveston Daily News. After over a century of publishing by the Morning News, the Almanac's assets were given to the Texas State Historical Association in May 2008.

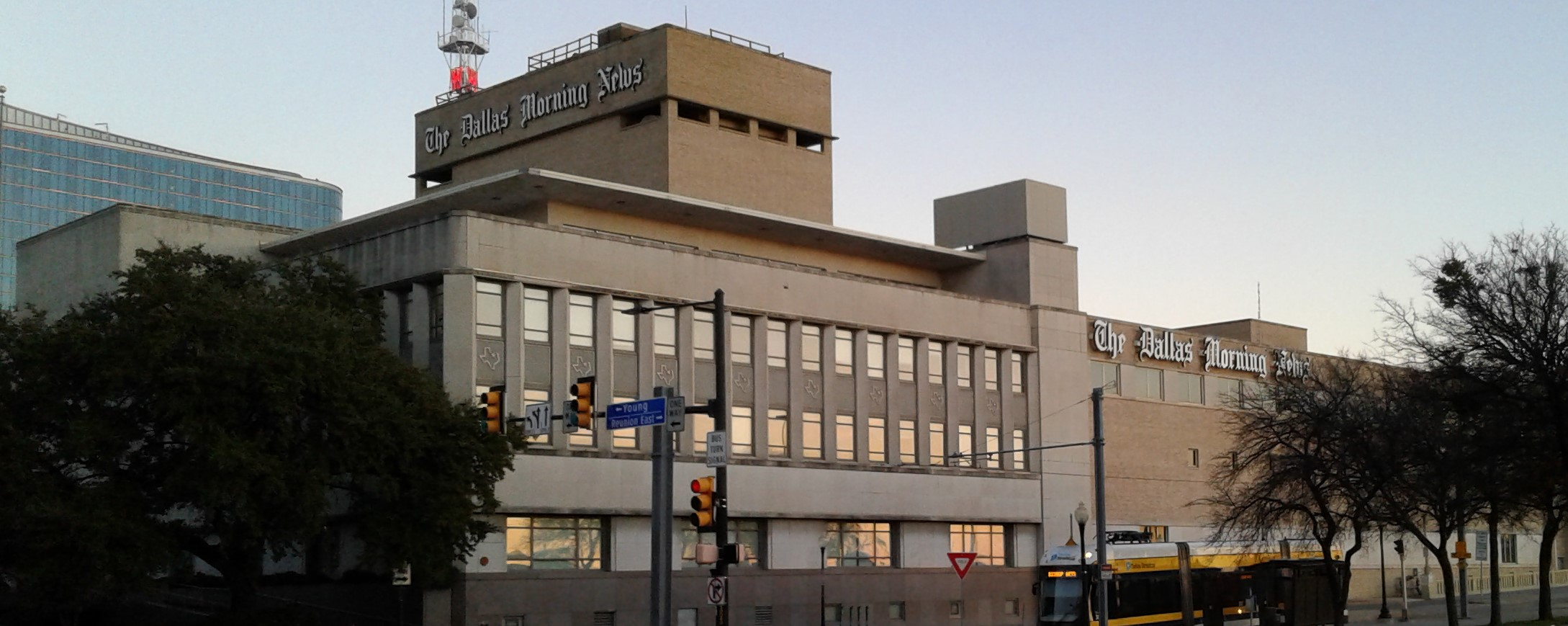

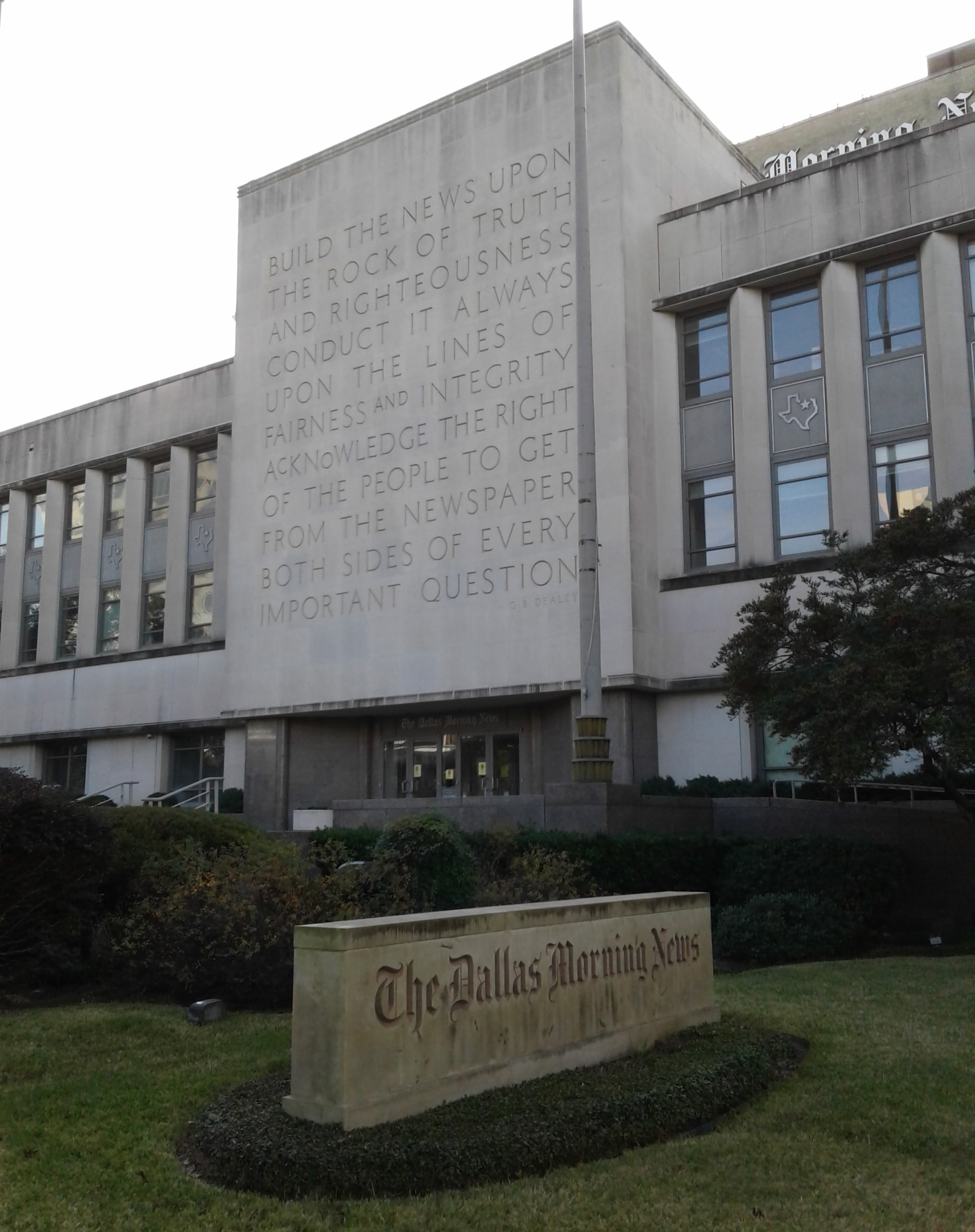
Building previously used and occupied by The Dallas Morning News

By the late 1940s, the Morning News had built and opened a new office, newsroom, and printing plant at Houston and Young Streets on the southwest side of downtown Dallas. A notable part of the facade above the front doors includes a quote etched in the stony exterior:

BUILD THE NEWS UPON
THE ROCK OF TRUTH
AND RIGHTEOUSNESS
CONDUCT IT ALWAYS
UPON THE LINES OF
FAIRNESS AND INTEGRITY
ACKNOWLEDGE THE RIGHT
OF THE PEOPLE TO GET
FROM THE NEWSPAPER
BOTH SIDES OF EVERY
IMPORTANT QUESTION
G. B. DEALEY

The complex at 508 Young Street would house all or part of the Morning News operations for the next six decades.

In late 1991, The Dallas Morning News became the lone major newspaper in the Dallas market when the Dallas Times Herald was closed after several years of circulation wars between the two papers, especially over the then-burgeoning classified advertising market. In July 1986, the Times Herald was purchased by William Dean Singleton, owner of MediaNews Group. After 18 months of efforts to turn the paper around, Singleton sold it to an associate. On December 8, 1991, Belo Corporation bought the Times Herald for $55 million, closing the paper the next day.

It was not the first time the Belo family had bought and closed a paper named The Herald in Dallas.

[In]...1879 Alfred H. Belo was investigating the possibility of establishing a sister paper in rapidly developing North Texas. When Belo's efforts to purchase the Herald [an extant paper in Dallas] failed, he sent George Bannerman Dealey to launch a new paper, the Morning News, which began publication on October 1, 1885. From the outset the Morning News enjoyed the double advantage of strong financial support and an accumulation of journalistic experience, and within a month and a half had absorbed its older rival.

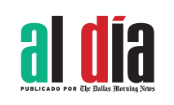
Al Día logo

In 2003, The Dallas Morning News launched a Spanish-language newspaper called Al Día . Initially Al Día came with a purchase price, but it was later made available free. It was published twice a week, on Wednesday and Saturday. Publication ceased in June 2023.

Between 2003 and 2011, a tabloid-sized publication called Quick was published by The Dallas Morning News, which initially focused on general news in a quick-read, digest form, but in later years covered mostly entertainment and lifestyle stories.

In late 2013, The Dallas Morning News ended its longtime news-gathering collaboration with previously co-owned TV station WFAA. The newspaper entered into a new partnership with KXAS at that time.

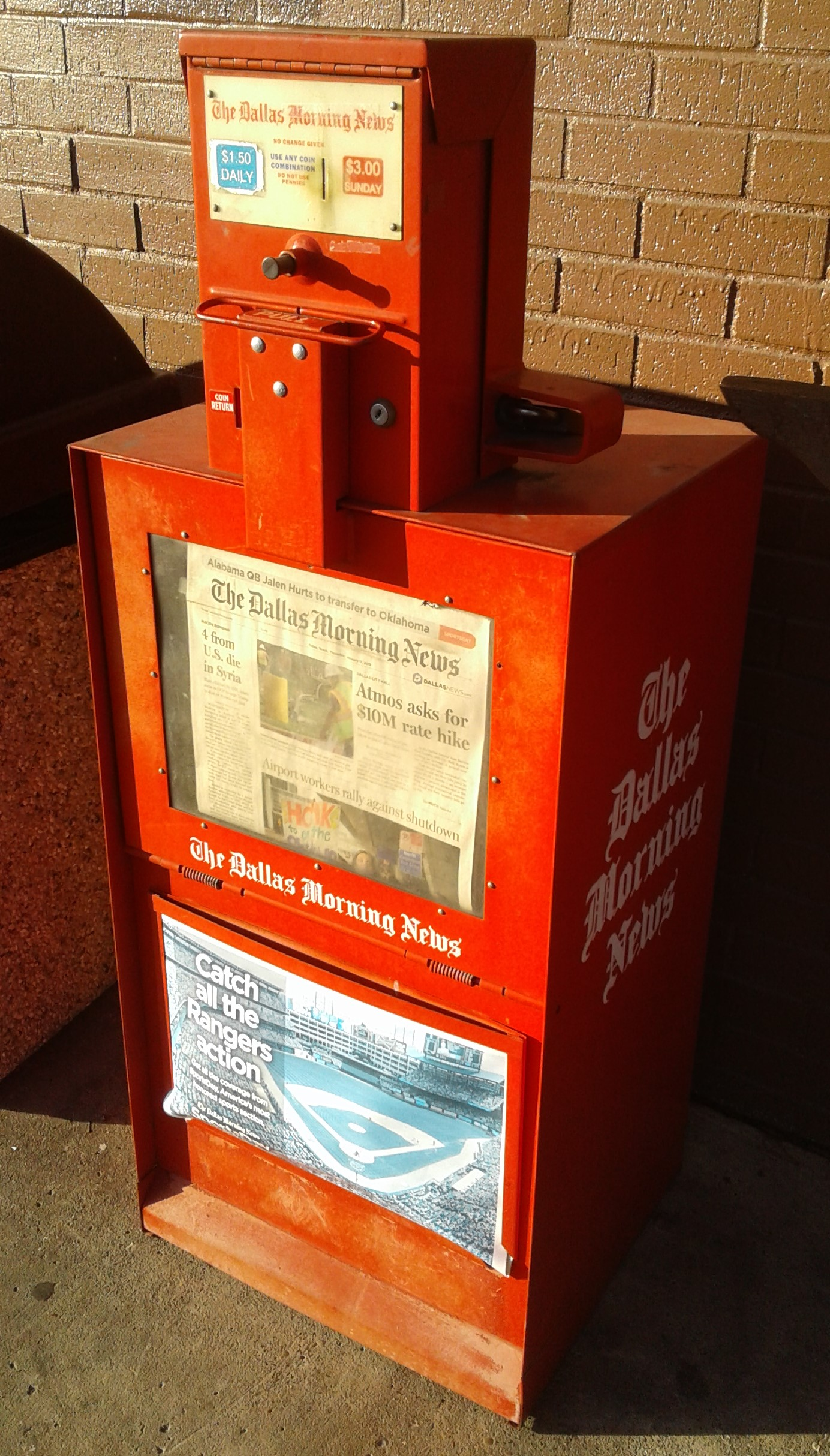
Newspaper vending machine with copies of The Dallas Morning News, in front of a restaurant in northeast Dallas, 2019

Historically, the Morning News' opinion section has tilted conservative, mirroring Texas' drift to the Republican Party since the 1950s. However, on September 7, 2016, it endorsed Hillary Clinton for president, the first time it had recommended a Democrat for president since Franklin D. Roosevelt in 1940. This came a day after it ran a scathing editorial declaring Republican candidate Donald Trump "not qualified to serve as president." It was the first time the paper had declined to recommend a Republican since 1964. Then, ahead of the 2018 midterm elections, the Morning News once again endorsed a Democratic candidate: Beto O'Rourke, the challenger to incumbent Senator Ted Cruz. In 2024, the Morning News endorsed Colin Allred and referenced Allred's bipartisanship and Cruz's divisiveness.

In late 2016, The Dallas Morning News announced it would move away from its home of 68 years on Young Street to a much-smaller building on Commerce Street previously used as the Dallas Public Library's downtown branch. Reasons given for the move included technology innovations and fewer staff, as well as printing presses no longer co-located with the newsroom and main offices. By December 2017, the move was completed. The former property was sold in October 2018 to a business partnership, which was looking into possible redevelopment opportunities for the complex, but in December 2018 the partnership backed out of the deal.

Changes were announced in January 2019, which included layoffs and reducing the paper's Business section to one separate section per week, on Sundays; the remainder of the week, Business coverage was placed in the paper's Metro section. A total of 43 employees were affected by the move.

In late February 2019, several printing agreements were not renewed at the Morning News' suburban printing plant, and 92 positions were affected by the change there. Publications that had to find a different printing partner included the Dallas Observer and Fort Worth Weekly.

In July 2021, Katrice Hardy was named executive editor of the Dallas Morning News, becoming the first woman and the first Black journalist to lead the newspaper.

DallasNews Corporation, the paper's owner, announced on September 13, 2023, it would offer buyouts eliminating up to 40 jobs, a 6% reduction in staff count. Buyouts would be offered starting on October 16. In May 2024, the company announced it would move its Plano printing operation, built in 1980, to a smaller facility in Carrollton. This would result in the elimination of 85 jobs, a 60% staff reduction. The changes were expected to save the company $5 million annually. The News reported in December 2024 it had agreed to sell the Plano location for $43.5 million. A new printing press will be purchased for the new site and is expected to be ready in 2025.

In July 2025, Hearst Communications announced it had agreed to purchase DallasNews Corporation for $14 a share. A few weeks later Alden Global Capital submitted a competing bid for $16.50 a share, which was rejected by the DallasNews board. Alden then submitted a letter threatening to take their offer directly to DallasNews shareholders. The merger with Hearst was completed on September 24, 2025, after DallasNews shareholders approved the transaction the previous day. After the sale closed, Hearst laid off 26 employees.

== Awards ==
=== Pulitzer Prizes ===
- 1986: National Reporting
- 1989: Explanatory Journalism
- 1991: Feature Photography
- 1992: Investigative Reporting
- 1993: Spot News Photography
- 1994: International Reporting
- 2004: Breaking News Photography
- 2006: Breaking News Photography
- 2010: Editorial Writing

=== George Polk Awards ===
- 1990: Gayle Reaves, David Hanners, and David McLemore for regional reporting
- 1994: Olive Talley for education reporting

=== Overseas Press Club Awards ===
- 2001: Cheryl Diaz Meyer for photographic reporting from abroad

== See also ==
- List of newspapers in Texas
- Fort Worth Star-Telegram
