= Honkytonk Sue =

1970s American comics character

The cover of issue #1 in Feb 1979

Honkytonk Sue: The Queen of Western Swing is a comic character that first appeared in National Lampoon in 1977. It was created by Bob Boze Bell. Honkytonk Sue later appeared as a weekly comic strip in the Phoenix New Times from 1978 to 1980. Four comic books culled from these weekly strips were self-published by Bell, the first being published in 1978 and the fourth in 1980.

As "the Queen of Western Swing", the character was idealized as "the ultimate image of the liberated Western woman", who can "out dance, out drink and out think any and all comers". In her stories, Honkytonk Sue confronted the Beatles, Yoga Rednecks, alien "Lady Killers" and Mr. Disco.

The character was optioned by Columbia Pictures in 1983. Larry McMurtry, among others, worked on scripts (four were created over a two-year period) for a Goldie Hawn vehicle, which was never made. The film was in development for more than six years before it was officially dropped. The Arizona Republic wrote, "Sue has gone through more rewrites than the New Testament, including one by Terms of Endearment sob sister Larry McMurtry, which changed Sue from a contemporary woman of the West to a superfeminist Native American activist. One of the last rewrites came from the pens of Peggy Sue Got Married scripters Jerry Leichtling and Arlene Sarner".

Honkytonk Sue had a revival on the pages of True West Magazine (which is edited by Bell) in 2002 and ran for several years.
