= Bob Boze Bell =

Arizona Western historian, artist, and writer

- Born: December 19, 1946 (age 79); Forest City, Iowa
- Occupations: Writer, Artist, Magazine Editor
- Years active: 1972 - present
- Known for: True West Magazine
- Notable work: Honkytonk Sue Comics

Bob Boze Bell is the owner and editor of True West Magazine as well as a writer, artist, and Western historian.

== Early life ==
Bob Boze Bell was born in Forest City, Iowa on December 19, 1946. His family moved to Peach Springs, Arizona when he was six-months old and later relocated to Kingman. Bell credits growing up along Route 66 as inspiring his interest in Western history.

Bell attended the University of Arizona After studying commercial art, but left shy of a degree. He took classes at Scottsdale Artists’ School and gained experience in an art studio working alongside Arizona painter Ed Mell for six years.

== Career ==
Bob Boze Bell began his writing career when he, along with friend and frequent collaborator, Daniel Harshbarger, inspired by National Lampoon, created the Razz Revue in 1972. The humor magazine was never commercially successful and ended after six years, but allowed the duo to gain an understanding of running a magazine.

Bell went on to join the Phoenix New Times as a writer and illustrator, creating a comic strip titled Honkytonk Sue. The popularity of the strip led to an option agreement with Columbia Pictures, although the film was never produced.

During the 1980s and early 1990s, Bell became a well-known voice in Arizona broadcasting as co-host of the popular KSLX radio program The Jones & Boze & Jeanne Show. At the same time, he continued to expand his artistic career through illustration, editorial cartooning, and historical writing, with work appearing in publications such as Arizona Highways, Playboy, National Lampoon, The Arizona Republic, and True West.

In 1999, Bob Boze Bell purchased True West Magazine, the long-running publication that had inspired his childhood fascination with Western history. As president and executive editor, he modernized the magazine while maintaining its commitment to historical scholarship, helping ensure the survival of the world’s oldest continuously published Western history magazine. Under his leadership, True West expanded its readership and strengthened its reputation as a leading source on the American frontier.

In addition to magazine publishing, Bell has authored and illustrated numerous books on iconic Western figures including Billy the Kid, Wyatt Earp, Doc Holliday, and Wild Bill Hickok. His works combine historical research with distinctive artwork, making Western history accessible to broad audiences. He has also appeared as a commentator and historian on television programs for the History Channel, Discovery Channel, PBS, and the American Heroes Channel, and hosted the long-running True West Moments series.

== Legacy ==
Throughout his career, Bell has remained one of Arizona’s most recognizable public historians. His contributions to Western history, art, publishing, and entertainment have earned him induction into the Arizona Music & Entertainment Hall of Fame as well as recognition as an Arizona Historymaker by the Arizona Historical League.
