= Dan Wolf (publisher) =

American newspaper editor

Dan Wolf (May 25, 1915 – April 11, 1996) was a New York writer, newspaper editor, and media entrepreneur, best known as one of the founders of The Village Voice.

== Biography ==
Wolf was born and raised on the Upper West Side of New York City and graduated from George Washington High School. He was drafted into the army as an infantryman in the Pacific theatre in World War II, where he was assigned to aerial intelligence in Papua New Guinea.

Wolf studied psychology at The New School, where he met Edwin Fancher, a future co-founder of the Village Voice, while waiting to register for classes. He met Norman Mailer, another future co-founder, through Jean Malaquais, who taught at The New School. Fancher and Mailer were also World War II veterans; the experience of seeing combat motivated the development of an 'alternative' newspaper with the goals of free thought and speech.

In 1955, he married Rhoda Lazare, a social worker who was a friend of Mailer's sister, with whom he had two children, Margaret and John. He died in 1996 at the age of 80.

== At The Village Voice ==
Wolf founded The Village Voice on October 26, 1955, with the novelist Norman Mailer and Edwin Fancher, a former truck driver who trained as a psychologist. They started the newspaper with $10,000 and no journalism experience, with Fancher as the publisher, Wolf as the editor-in-chief, and Mailer as a silent partner who supplied most of the capital, following the success of his novel The Naked and the Dead. The papers sold at 5 cents a piece, with a yearly subscription for $2. The first issue was 12 pages, with 200 issues sold. The original Voice logo was designed by Nell Blaine.

The Village Voice was the first and largest alternative weekly publication in the U.S. In 1967, it was the best-selling weekly newspaper in the nation and created several long-lasting institutions, such as the Obie Awards, created by writer Jerry Tallmer. Wolf remained at the Voice for 19 years, where he advocated for reform policies, including the support of mayoral candidate Ed Koch, who was the Voice's lawyer. Wolf and Fancher hoped to use the Voice as a launchpad for unknown writers and cartoonists, such as Jules Feiffer, Hilton Als, Michael Harrington, Stephanie Gervis, Jonas Mekas, Jill Johnston, Andrew Sarris, and Colson Whitehead, some of whom began their careers at the Voice after being rejected by more traditional publishers.

Although Wolf's title was editor-in-chief, he rarely edited the copies the Voice writers submitted to him, preferring to direct and orchestrate their focuses instead, as he disliked 'professional' writers. Wolf wrote in the introduction to The Village Voice Reader, "The Village Voice was originally conceived as a living, breathing attempt to demolish the notion that one needs to be a professional to accomplish something in a field as purportedly technical as journalism." Following an argument about a short-lived column Mailer wrote during which Wolf accused him of being like "the worst cartoon caricature of a capitalist with a high hat beating the slaves", Mailer quit the paper.

In 1970, Taurus Communications, Inc., co-owned by New York City Council member Carter Burden and publisher Bartle Bull, bought a controlling interest in the Voice from Wolf and Fancher. Although Bull was named vice president and general counsel, Fancher remained in his role as publisher and Wolf as editor-in-chief.

== Life after the Voice ==
In 1974, the Voice merged with New York magazine. Wolf and Fancher were fired from the Voice six weeks later by Clay Felker, who bought the Voice from Burden and Bull and named himself editor-in-chief and publisher.

When Ed Koch, a former U.S. Congressman, was elected mayor of New York City in 1978, he asked Wolf to become his press secretary. Wolf declined, concerned about his work-life balance, but agreed to work as Koch's advisor.
