= Association for Women Journalists =

The Association for Women Journalists is an American professional organization to support women working in the journalism field, and girls who aspire to the field.

The first Association for Women Journalists chapter was founded in 1988 in Dallas-Fort Worth, Texas.

Association for Women Journalists' Chicago chapter was later founded in 1993 and fashioned after the Dallas-Ft. Worth group. The chapter's initial meeting was held at Northwestern University's Medill School of Journalism.
