= Character sketch =

Rough-and-ready rendering of individual character

In literature, a character sketch, or character, is a rough-and-ready rendering and thumbnail portrayal of an individual, capturing, in brief, that person's physical characteristics, psychological attributes, and the like. The brief descriptions often capitalize on the more unusual or humorous aspects of the person's character. Character sketches are usually identified by irony, humor, exaggeration, and satire. The term originated in portraiture, where the character sketch is a common academic exercise. The artist performing a character sketch attempts to capture an expression or gesture that goes beyond coincident actions and gets to the essence of the individual.

The first English writer to delve into the form, Joseph Hall, published his book Characters of Virtues and Vices in 1608. However, the character sketch did not become popular amongst the literate public until the late-seventeenth century. The public appreciated sketches for their humor and readable style. As Pat Rogers notes, Henry Fielding, in book I, chapter 8 of Joseph Andrews (1742), invokes William Hogarth (1697–1764) to create a character sketch of Mrs. Tow-wouse: "Indeed, if Mrs. Tow-wouse had given no Utterance to the Sweetness of her Temper, Nature had taken such Pains in her Countenance, that Hogarth himself never gave more Expression to a Picture." Thomas Overbury (c. 1581-1613), John Earle (c. 1601-1665), Richard Steele (1672–1729), and Joseph Addison (1672–1719) also wrote notable character sketches. Addison and Steele's sketches appeared in a periodical that was issued twice a week under the name The Spectator (1711–1712). They created several personas such as Roger de Coverly, Mr. Spectator, and Captain Sentry, who represented different classes in English society. Using the point of view of these personas, Addison and Steele wrote sketches that addressed important events in the social and political atmospheres. In the United States, Walt Whitman published a series of character sketches in 1856. Whitman's sketches involved mostly physical descriptions, however, like Addison and Steele, his sketches were written with a purpose. Rather than make social or political commentary, Whitman used the opportunity to provide sketches that publicly praised his friends and ridiculed his enemies.

In later literature, a character sketch became a short story or narrative presented without significant action or plot, as the purpose of the writing is solely to present a character at their typical. Character sketches of this sort are also frequently found in journalism and regionalist humor (e.g., sketches of "Big John" or "the country rube" or "the wise Squire"). Each of these attempts to delineate a model of a type (a category of person) rather than a realistic person.

Today, the character sketch appears mostly in the writings of satiric novelists such as Thomas Pynchon (1937– ). The character sketch has also been adapted to appear on television in both dramatic and comedic forms such as TV serials, movies etc.

== See also ==
- Model sheet
