= Fort Worth Weekly =

- Type: Alternative weekly
- Founder: Robert Camuto
- Founded: 1996
- Language: English
- Headquarters: Fort Worth, Texas
- Website: www.fwweekly.com

Fort Worth Weekly is an alternative weekly newspaper that serves the Greater Fort Worth area (all of Tarrant County and some of Denton County).

The newspaper has an approximate circulation of 35,000. It is published every Wednesday and features news, editorials, profiles, and reviews of art, books, theatrical productions, food, films, music, and more, plus classifieds. With the exception of film, the Weekly's editorial coverage is 100 percent local.

The Weekly publishes an annual "Best Of" issue in the fall, and special advertising sections (including ones devoted to restaurants, holiday shopping, and education). It also produces events, including Thursday Night Live, a free weekly outdoor spring/summer concert series produced in collaboration with Central Market; First Friday on the Green, a free monthly outdoor spring/summer concert series produced in collaboration with Fort Worth South Inc.; the Visionary Awards, $500 cash awards given to three outstanding up-and-coming Fort Worth artists; and the Fort Worth Weekly Music Awards and Music Awards Festival, a free day-long concert featuring nearly 50 bands, all local, performing in several different venues scattered throughout Fort Worth's West 7th Street corridor.

== Staff ==
The editorial department at the Fort Worth Weekly is led by Anthony Mariani, named editor in April 2015. Gayle Reaves, a winner of both the Pulitzer Prize and the George Polk Award, was editor from October 2001 to March 2015.

The Fort Worth Weekly is owned by publisher Lee Newquist.

== History ==
Fort Worth Weekly was founded in 1996 as FW Weekly by Robert Camuto, a former features editor at the Fort Worth Star-Telegram and son of Nine West co-founder Vince Camuto. Robert Camuto sold The Weekly to national alt-weekly chain New Times Media in August, 2000. New Times vice president and Dallas Observer publisher Lee Newquist purchased the paper and separated from the company a year later.
