= Bruce B. Brugmann =

American newspaper editor and publisher

Bruce B. Brugmann is the former editor and publisher of the San Francisco Bay Guardian, a weekly alternative newspaper published in San Francisco. He co-founded the newspaper with his wife, Jean Dibble, in 1966.

Brugmann was born in Rock Rapids, Iowa. He earned a bachelor's degree from the University of Nebraska, where he was editor of the college newspaper, and a master's degree from the Columbia University Graduate School of Journalism. Brugmann spent two years in the Army as an infantryman and journalist, including a stint in South Korea, where he worked at the Stars and Stripes as a bureau chief. Brugmann spent a year working at the Lincoln Star, three years at the Milwaukee Journal, and three years at the now-defunct Redwood City Tribune.

Brugmann was one of the founders of the California First Amendment Coalition as well as the Association of Alternative Newsweeklies.

He is known as a passionate advocate for public access to public records. He won a Beacon Award from the California First Amendment Coalition. The Northern California Chapter of the Society for Professional Journalists, which he served as president of, gave him a Career Achievement Award. He served as a board member on the Sunshine Ordinance Task Force, which enforces San Francisco's public records rules.

In recent years, Brugmann usually maintained a low public profile in San Francisco. However, during a short lived advertising campaign in the mid-2000s, Brugmann became, literally, the face of the Bay Guardian. Advertisements featured photographs and graphic depictions of Brugmann appeared in print, on signs, and on the advertising panels of SF Muni buses. The text of the ads related to the functions of the Guardian, such as local news, relationships, classifieds. etc., and always concluded with the exhortation, "Read my paper, dammit!" With his features and his words being carried throughout the city on the sides of the buses, Bruce Brugmann was, for a short time, unavoidable.
