= True West Magazine =

US magazine covering the Old West

- Cover of True West, July 2005
- Categories: American Old West
- Frequency: Monthly
- Founded: 1953
- Company: True West Publishing
- Country: United States
- Based in: Cave Creek, Arizona, U.S.
- Website: truewestmagazine.com
- ISSN: 0041-3615

True West Magazine — alternate title, True West — is an American periodical focusing on the Old West.

Started in 1953, True West is headquartered in Cave Creek, Arizona, and publishes monthly. It is the world's oldest, continuously published Western American magazine.

== History ==
True West began publication in 1953 under founder Joe Small of Austin, Texas. The idea for True West originated from a monthly feature in Small's first publication, Sporting Magazine. The magazine's recurring "Bad Man" article, about outlaws of the West, was the feature that generated the most reader mail and interest. True West was born to satisfy the readers' hunger for Old West history.

True West was the largest Western magazine on the market in the 1960s, selling hundreds of thousands of copies monthly at newsstands. The magazine benefited from an era featuring popular television western series such as Bonanza, The Lone Ranger, and Gunsmoke. At least one episode, "The Hunted" (1958), of the ABC/Warner Brothers series Sugarfoot is based on a True West article. Fans interested in the lives of real cowboys and cowgirls found those stories in True West.

After that, the early era of television westerns faded during the time of the Vietnam War and disco music. In 1979, Small sold the magazine to Chet Krause of Iola, Wisconsin. Small stayed on as publisher, with Krause as assistant publisher. The magazine saw a few moves—to Perkins, Oklahoma, then Stillwater—before the 1999 move to Cave Creek, Arizona. Among its new owners was Bob Boze Bell, who first discovered the magazine as a nine-year-old at Desert Drugs in Kingman, Arizona. The publication sparked a lifelong interest in the Old West. As the January 2000 issue was being edited, Bell flew to Stillwater to design the cover because he, "wanted to own the millennium."

Bell felt the magazine needed to change with the times or it would not survive. One of the first changes he made was switching the magazine from pulp paper to gloss, as True West was one of the last remaining publications using pulp. He also expanded the coverage of Western movies, since so many people developed a love of Old West history after being exposed to Westerns on television or the big screen. He added, and still writes, the successful "Classic Gunfights" department that has featured more than one hundred gunfights of the Old West.

In 2007, Ken Amorosano joined the team as associate publisher. In 2011, he became True West's publisher and set the magazine in a new direction, catering the publication more toward its core history aficionados and expanding the magazine's readership globally.

== Television ==
Executive editor Bob Boze Bell is regularly featured on True West Moments, which airs on Encore's Westerns channel. He responds to inquiries from around the world.

In 2012, in honor of Arizona's centennial, True West created and released the show Outrageous Arizona, an irreverent and humorous look at the history of Arizona, hosted by Bob Boze Bell and True West contributors Jana Bommersbach and Marshall Trimble. The show aired on select PBS stations in the Southwest. Outrageous Arizona received an EMMY Award from Rocky Mountain Southwest Chapter of the National Academy of Television Arts and Sciences (NATAS) in 2013.
