= Ed Fancher =

American newspaper publisher (1923–2023)

Edwin Crawford Fancher (August 29, 1923 – September 27, 2023) was an American newspaper publisher and psychologist.

One of the three founders of The Village Voice, Fancher was responsible for the paper's circulation, distribution, and advertising. He was one of the founders of the Washington Square Consultation Center, later the Washington Square Institute for Psychotherapy and Mental Health. Fancher died on September 27, 2023, at the age of 100.
