= 1992–93 Wake Forest Demon Deacons men's basketball team =

American college basketball season

1992–93 Wake Forest Demon Deacons men's basketball

NCAA tournament, Regional semifinal
- Conference: Atlantic Coast Conference

Ranking
- Coaches: No. 14
- AP: No. 16
- Record: 21–9 (10–6 ACC)
- Head coach: Dave Odom (4th season)
- Assistant coaches: Larry Davis; Ricky Stokes; Jerry Wainwright
- Home arena: LJVM Coliseum

1992–93 ACC men's basketball standings
	Conf.				Overall
Team	W		L	PCT	W		L	PCT
No. 4 North Carolina	14	–	2	.875	34	–	4	.895
No. 11 Florida State	12	–	4	.750	25	–	10	.714
No. 10 Duke	10	–	6	.625	24	–	8	.750
No. 16 Wake Forest	10	–	6	.625	21	–	9	.700
Virginia	9	–	7	.563	21	–	10	.677
No. 18 Georgia Tech †	8	–	8	.500	19	–	11	.633
Clemson	5	–	11	.313	17	–	13	.567
Maryland	2	–	14	.125	12	–	16	.429
NC State	2	–	14	.125	8	–	19	.296
† 1993 ACC tournament winner Rankings from AP poll

The 1992–93 Wake Forest Demon Deacons men's basketball team represented Wake Forest University as a member of the Atlantic Coast Conference during the 1992–93 NCAA men's basketball season. The team was led by fourth-year head coach Dave Odom, and played their home games at LJVM Coliseum in Winston-Salem, North Carolina.

The Demon Deacons finished tied for third in the ACC regular season with an 10–6 conference record. The team lost to Virginia in the quarterfinal round of the ACC tournament, but received an at-large bid to the NCAA tournament as No. 5 seed in the Southeast region. Making their third straight appearance in the NCAA tournament, Wake Forest beat Chattanooga and Iowa to advance to the Sweet Sixteen for the first time since 1984. The Demon Deacons were eliminated by No. 1 seed Kentucky in the regional semifinal round to finish with a 21–9 overall record.

Junior Rodney Rogers was ACC Player of the Year, a consensus second-team All-American, and was selected by the Denver Nuggets with the 9th overall pick in the 1993 NBA draft.

== Previous season ==
Wake Forest finished with a 17–12 record (7–9 ACC) and reached the NCAA tournament for the second straight season.

== Roster ==
1992–93 Wake Forest Demon Deacons men's basketball team
Players
Coaches

Pos.	#	Name	Height	Weight	Year	Previous school	Hometown
F	34	Travis Banks	6 ft 6 in (1.98 m)	215 lb (98 kg)	So	Clinton HS	Clinton, NC
G	25	Marc Blucas	6 ft 3 in (1.91 m)	190 lb (86 kg)	Jr	Girard HS	Girard, PA
G	3	Barry Canty	6 ft 5 in (1.96 m)	170 lb (77 kg)	Fr	Independence	Charlotte, NC
G	5	Stacey Castle	6 ft 1 in (1.85 m)	170 lb (77 kg)	Fr	Oak Hill Academy (VA)	Far Rockaway, NY
G	22	Randolph Childress (C)	6 ft 2 in (1.88 m)	175 lb (79 kg)	So	Flint Hill School	Clinton, MD
F	42	Bobby Fitzgibbons	6 ft 8 in (2.03 m)	205 lb (93 kg)	Fr	Nichols	Buffalo, NY
G	11	Charlie Harrison	6 ft 1 in (1.85 m)	165 lb (75 kg)	Jr	Archbishop Carroll	Washington, DC
F/C	21	Derrick Hicks	6 ft 9 in (2.06 m)	220 lb (100 kg)	Sr	Anderson JC	Raleigh, NC
C	51	Stan King	7 ft 0 in (2.13 m)	252 lb (114 kg)	Jr	August Martin	Jamaica, NY
G	10	Rusty LaRue	6 ft 2 in (1.88 m)	175 lb (79 kg)	Fr	Northwest Guilford HS	Oak Ridge, NC
F	40	Trelonnie Owens (C)	6 ft 8 in (2.03 m)	245 lb (111 kg)	Jr	Bladenboro HS	Bladenboro, NC
F	35	David Rasmussen	6 ft 7 in (2.01 m)	190 lb (86 kg)	Sr	Ricks JC	East Lansing, MI
C	55	Steve Rich	6 ft 9 in (2.06 m)	245 lb (111 kg)	Fr	Cardinal Gibbons	Fort Lauderdale, FL
F	54	Rodney Rogers (C)	6 ft 7 in (2.01 m)	235 lb (107 kg)	Jr	Southern HS	Durham, NC

Head coach

- Dave Odom

Assistant coach(es)

- Larry Davis
- Ricky Stokes
- Jerry Wainwright

Legend

- (C) Team captain
- (S) Suspended
- (I) Ineligible
- (W) Walk-on
- Injured
- Current redshirt

Roster
Last update: 2016-Mar-01

== Schedule and results ==
Date time, TV	Rank^{#}	Opponent^{#}	Result	Record	Site city, state
Regular season
Dec 1, 1992*		Radford	W 81–62	1–0	LJVM Coliseum; Winston-Salem, North Carolina
Dec 5, 1992*		Vermont	W 95–76	2–0	LJVM Coliseum; Winston-Salem, North Carolina
Dec 15, 1992*		Rhode Island	W 69–65	3–0	LJVM Coliseum; Winston-Salem, North Carolina
Dec 19, 1992*		Richmond	W 88–74	4–0	LJVM Coliseum; Winston-Salem, North Carolina
Dec 22, 1992*		at No. 21 California	L 65–81	4–1	Harmon Gym; Berkeley, California
Dec 28, 1992*		vs. Davidson	W 71–52	5–1	Charlotte Coliseum; Charlotte, North Carolina
Dec 30, 1992*		Lafayette	W 74–47	6–1	LJVM Coliseum; Winston-Salem, North Carolina
Jan 2, 1993*		Mount St. Mary's	W 76–65	7–1	LJVM Coliseum; Winston-Salem, North Carolina
Jan 7, 1993*		Winthrop	W 99–65	8–1	LJVM Coliseum; Winston-Salem, North Carolina
Jan 9, 1993		No. 23 Florida State	L 72–74	8–2 (0–1)	LJVM Coliseum; Winston-Salem, North Carolina
Jan 13, 1993		No. 3 Duke	L 59–86	8–3 (0–2)	LJVM Coliseum; Winston-Salem, North Carolina
Jan 16, 1993		at Maryland	W 86–73	9–3 (1–2)	Cole Fieldhouse; College Park, Maryland
Jan 21, 1993		at No. 16 Georgia Tech	W 81–58	10–3 (2–2)	Alexander Memorial Coliseum; Atlanta, Georgia
Jan 24, 1993		Clemson	W 74–56	11–3 (3–2)	LJVM Coliseum; Winston-Salem, North Carolina
Jan 27, 1993		at No. 15 Virginia	W 75–73	12–3 (4–2)	University Hall; Charlottesville, Virginia
Jan 30, 1993		No. 3 North Carolina	W 88–62	13–3 (5–2)	LJVM Coliseum; Winston-Salem, North Carolina
Feb 4, 1993	No. 13	at NC State	W 65–54	14–3 (6–2)	Reynolds Coliseum; Raleigh, North Carolina
Feb 7, 1993*	No. 13	at Temple	W 106–69	15–3	McGonigle Hall; Philadelphia, Pennsylvania
Feb 10, 1993	No. 9	at No. 10 Florida State	L 94–111	15–4 (6–3)	Leon County Civic Center; Tallahassee, Florida
Feb 13, 1993	No. 9	at No. 3 Duke	W 98–86	16–4 (7–3)	Cameron Indoor Stadium; Durham, North Carolina
Feb 17, 1993	No. 10	Maryland	W 88–64	17–4 (8–3)	LJVM Coliseum; Winston-Salem, North Carolina
Feb 20, 1993	No. 10	Georgia Tech	L 58–69	17–5 (8–4)	LJVM Coliseum; Winston-Salem, North Carolina
Feb 24, 1993	No. 12	at Clemson	L 74–76	17–6 (8–5)	Littlejohn Coliseum; Clemson, South Carolina
Feb 27, 1993*	No. 12	No. 22 Virginia	W 58–56	18–6 (9–5)	LJVM Coliseum; Winston-Salem, North Carolina
Mar 3, 1993	No. 14	at No. 1 North Carolina	L 65–83	18–7 (9–6)	Dean Smith Center; Chapel Hill, North Carolina
Mar 6, 1993*	No. 14	NC State	W 80–68	19–7 (10–6)	LJVM Coliseum; Winston-Salem, North Carolina
ACC Tournament
Mar 12, 1993*	No. 12	vs. Virginia; ACC Tournament Quarterfinal	L 57–61	19–8	Charlotte Coliseum; Charlotte, North Carolina
NCAA Tournament
Mar 19, 1993*	(5 SE) No. 16	vs. (12 SE) Chattanooga; First round	W 81–58	20–8	Memorial Gymnasium; Nashville, Tennessee
Mar 21, 1993*	(5 SE) No. 16	vs. (4 SE) No. 13 Iowa; Second Round	W 84–78	21–8	Memorial Gymnasium; Nashville, Tennessee
Mar 25, 1993*	(5 SE) No. 16	vs. (1 SE) No. 2 Kentucky; Regional semifinal – Sweet Sixteen	L 69–103	21–9	Charlotte Coliseum; Charlotte, North Carolina
*Non-conference game. ^{#}Rankings from AP Poll. (#) Tournament seedings in parentheses. SE=Southeast. All times are in Eastern Time.

== Awards and honors ==
- Rodney Rogers – ACC Player of the Year, Consensus, second-team All-American

== NBA draft ==
Round	Pick	Player	NBA club
1	9	Rodney Rogers	Denver Nuggets
