= Frank McLaughlin (basketball) =

American basketball coach and athletic director (born 1947)

Biographical details
- Born: 1947 (age 78–79); The Bronx, New York, U.S.
- Education: Fordham University

Playing career
- 1966–1969: Fordham
- Position: Guard

Coaching career (HC unless noted)
- 1969–1970: Holy Cross (assistant)
- 1970–1971: Fordham (assistant)
- 1971–1977: Notre Dame (assistant)
- 1977–1985: Harvard

Administrative career (AD unless noted)
- 1985–2012: Fordham

Head coaching record
- Overall: 99-110

Francis Xavier McLaughlin (born 1947) is an American coach and administrator who was the head coach of the Harvard Crimson men's basketball team from 1977 to 1985 and athletic director at Fordham University from 1985 to 2012.

== Early life ==
McLaughlin was born in The Bronx and grew up in Woodlawn Heights. He was the fourth of five children born to Walter McLaughlin, a New York City Police Department detective, and his wife Margaret Lynch McLaughlin. His older brothers, Walter Jr. and Jackie, were standout athletes at Fordham Preparatory School. Jackie McLaughlin played for the Saint Louis Billikens men's basketball team until his death in an automobile accident. Their younger brother, Tom, is a former UMass Minutemen basketball coach.

== Playing ==
McLaughlin led the Fordham Prep basketball team in scoring all three years he was a varsity player and was a unanimous selection to the 1965 All-City First Team. He then played for the Fordham Rams men's basketball team, where he averaged 10.0 points and 3.3 rebounds over 77 games and helped lead the Rams to an appearance in the 1969 National Invitation Tournament. He was selected in the 10th round of the 1969 NBA draft by the New York Knicks.

== Coaching ==
McLaughlin began his coaching career as an assistant to Jack Donohue at the College of the Holy Cross. After one season with the Crusaders, McLaughlin returned to his alma mater as an assistant to Digger Phelps. He followed Phelps to South Bend when he became the head coach of the Notre Dame Fighting Irish men's basketball team. In 1977, McLaughlin replaced Satch Sanders as the head basketball coach at Harvard. His teams compiled a 99–110 record over eight seasons and did not win any Ivy League championships.

== Administration ==
On October 1, 1985, McLaughlin was named athletic director at Fordham. Fordham's athletic department saw exponential growth during McLaughlin's tenure. He oversaw the addition of two new varsity sports (women's soccer and rowing), the creation of eight full-time coaching positions, promotion of several coaches from part-time to full-time status, and the addition to full-time staffing in the sports medicine, strength and conditioning, and sports information departments. During this time, the school also renovated Bahoshy Softball Field, Coffey Field, and the Murphy Field complex as well as the constructed of a new locker rooms for the football and basketball teams. Under McLaughlin, the Rams won 26 conference championships. In 2012, he was promoted to the new position of associate vice president of student affairs for athletic alumni relations and external affairs. In 2022, he became a special advisor to the director of intercollegiate athletics and recreational sports. He retired on December 31, 2023.

== Honors ==
McLaughlin is a member of the Fordham Athletic Hall of Fame, Fordham Preparatory School Hall of Honor, Eastern College Athletic Conference Hall of Fame, Westchester County Sports Hall of Fame, Catholic High School Athletic Association Hall of Fame, and New England Basketball Hall of Fame. In 2022, Fordham dedicated the floor in the Rose Hill Gym as the Frank McLaughlin Family Court in his honor.

== Personal life ==
McLaughlin and his wife reside in Briarcliff Manor, New York. They have three daughters who all graduated from Fordham.
