= 1992–93 Georgia Tech Yellow Jackets men's basketball team =

American college basketball season

1992–93 Georgia Tech Yellow Jackets men's basketball

ACC tournament champion

NCAA tournament
- Conference: Atlantic Coast Conference

Ranking
- AP: No. 18
- Record: 19–11 (8–8 ACC)
- Head coach: Bobby Cremins (12th season)
- Assistant coaches: Kevin Cantwell (7th season); Sherman Dillard (5th season); Jimmy Hebron (12th season)
- Home arena: Alexander Memorial Coliseum

1992–93 ACC men's basketball standings
	Conf.				Overall
Team	W		L	PCT	W		L	PCT
No. 4 North Carolina	14	–	2	.875	34	–	4	.895
No. 11 Florida State	12	–	4	.750	25	–	10	.714
No. 10 Duke	10	–	6	.625	24	–	8	.750
No. 16 Wake Forest	10	–	6	.625	21	–	9	.700
Virginia	9	–	7	.563	21	–	10	.677
No. 18 Georgia Tech †	8	–	8	.500	19	–	11	.633
Clemson	5	–	11	.313	17	–	13	.567
Maryland	2	–	14	.125	12	–	16	.429
NC State	2	–	14	.125	8	–	19	.296
† 1993 ACC tournament winner Rankings from AP poll

The 1992–93 Georgia Tech Yellow Jackets men's basketball team represented the Georgia Institute of Technology as a member of the Atlantic Coast Conference during the 1992–93 NCAA men's basketball season. Led by 12th year head coach Bobby Cremins, the Yellow Jackets reached the NCAA tournament where they were upset in the opening round by No. 13 seed Southern.

== Roster ==
1992–93 Georgia Tech Yellow Jackets men's basketball team
Players
Coaches

Pos.	#	Name	Height	Weight	Year	Hometown
G	34	Rod Balanis	6 ft 3 in (1.91 m)	192 lb (87 kg)	Jr	Williamsburg, Virginia
F	15	Darryl Barnes	6 ft 8 in (2.03 m)	202 lb (92 kg)	Jr	Brooklyn, New York
G	10	Drew Barry	6 ft 5 in (1.96 m)	180 lb (82 kg)	Fr	Oakland, California
G	3	Travis Best	5 ft 11 in (1.8 m)	175 lb (79 kg)	So	Springfield, Massachusetts
PF	34	James Forrest	6 ft 8 in (2.03 m)	235 lb (107 kg)	So	Atlanta, Georgia
G	10	James Gaddy	6 ft 3 in (1.91 m)	178 lb (81 kg)	Sr	Macon, Georgia
G	11	Bryan Hill	6 ft 4 in (1.93 m)	226 lb (103 kg)	Sr	Arlington, Virginia
G		Shawn Jones	6 ft 1 in (1.85 m)	—	Sr
G		John Kelly	5 ft 11 in (1.8 m)	—	So
F	32	Malcolm Mackey	6 ft 10 in (2.08 m)	243 lb (110 kg)	Sr	Chattanooga, Tennessee
F		Martice Moore	6 ft 7 in (2.01 m)	—	Fr	Mouth of Wilson, Virginia
F	33	Ivano Newbill	6 ft 9 in (2.06 m)	224 lb (102 kg)	Jr	Macon, Georgia
SG	24	Fred Vinson	6 ft 4 in (1.93 m)	185 lb (84 kg)	RS Sr	Conway, North Carolina

Head coach

- Bobby Cremins (South Carolina)

Assistant coach(es)

- Kevin Cantwell
- Sherman Dillard
- Jimmy Hebron

Legend

- (C) Team captain
- (S) Suspended
- (I) Ineligible
- (W) Walk-on
- Injured
- Current redshirt

== Schedule ==
Date time, TV	Rank^{#}	Opponent^{#}	Result	Record	Site city, state
Non-conference regular season
Dec 1, 1992*	No. 13	Florida A&M	W 112–83	1–0	Alexander Memorial Coliseum; Atlanta, Georgia
Dec 5, 1992*	No. 13	at No. 5 Kentucky	L 87–96	1–1	Rupp Arena; Lexington, Kentucky
ACC Regular Season
Jan 5, 1993	No. 10	at Maryland	W 85–75	8–1 (1–0)	Cole Fieldhouse; College Park, Maryland
Jan 10, 1993	No. 10	No. 1 Duke	W 80–79	9–1 (2–0)	Alexander Memorial Coliseum; Atlanta, Georgia
Jan 13, 1993	No. 8	at No. 5 North Carolina	L 67–80	9–2 (2–1)	Dean Smith Center; Chapel Hill, North Carolina
Mar 4, 1993		No. 11 Florida State	L 82–83	15–10 (7–8)	Alexander Memorial Coliseum; Atlanta, Georgia
Mar 7, 1993		at Clemson	W 66–59	16–10 (8–8)	Littlejohn Coliseum; Clemson, South Carolina
ACC tournament
Mar 12, 1993*		vs. No. 8 Duke; Quarterfinals	W 69–66	17–10	Charlotte Coliseum; Charlotte, North Carolina
Mar 13, 1993*		vs. Clemson; Semifinals	W 69–61	18–10	Charlotte Coliseum; Charlotte, North Carolina
Mar 14, 1993*		vs. No. 1 North Carolina; Championship game	W 77–75	19–10	Charlotte Coliseum; Charlotte, North Carolina
NCAA tournament
Mar 19, 1993*	(4 W) No. 18	vs. (13 W) Southern; First round	L 78–93	19–11	McKale Center; Tucson, Arizona
*Non-conference game. ^{#}Rankings from AP poll. (#) Tournament seedings in parentheses. W=West.

== Players in the 1993 NBA draft ==
Round	Pick	Player	NBA club
1	27	Malcolm Mackey	Phoenix Suns
