= 1992–93 Rhode Island Rams men's basketball team =

American college basketball season

1992–93 Rhode Island Rams men's basketball

NCAA tournament, Second round
- Conference: Atlantic 10 Conference
- Record: 19–11 (8–6 A-10)
- Head coach: Al Skinner (5th season)
- Home arena: Keaney Gymnasium

1992–93 Atlantic 10 men's basketball standings
	Conf.				Overall
Team	W		L	PCT	W		L	PCT
No. 14 UMass †	11	–	3	.786	24	–	7	.774
George Washington	8	–	6	.571	21	–	9	.700
Rhode Island	8	–	6	.571	19	–	11	.633
Saint Joseph's	8	–	6	.571	18	–	11	.621
Temple	8	–	6	.571	20	–	13	.606
West Virginia	7	–	7	.500	17	–	12	.586
Rutgers	6	–	8	.429	13	–	15	.464
St. Bonaventure	0	–	14	.000	10	–	17	.370
† 1993 Atlantic 10 Tournament winner Rankings from AP Poll

The 1992–93 Rhode Island Rams men's basketball team represented the University of Rhode Island in the 1992–93 college basketball season. This was head coach Al Skinner's fifth of nine seasons at Rhode Island. The Rams competed in the Atlantic 10 Conference and played their home games at Keaney Gymnasium. They finished the season 19–11, 8–6 in A-10 play and lost in the semifinals of the 1993 Atlantic 10 men's basketball tournament. Rhode Island was invited to the 1993 NCAA tournament as No. 8 seed in the East region. In the opening round, they defeated No. 9 seed Purdue, but fell to No. 1 seed and eventual National champion North Carolina in the round of 32.

== Roster ==
1992–93 Rhode Island Rams men's basketball team
Players
Coaches

Pos.	#	Name	Height	Weight	Year	Hometown
G		Carlos Easterling	6 ft 2 in (1.88 m)	—	Sr
G	25	Abdul Fox	6 ft 6 in (1.98 m)	—	Jr
F		Andre Samuel	6 ft 5 in (1.96 m)	—	Jr

Head coach

- Jim Harrick

Assistant coach(es)

Legend

- (C) Team captain
- (S) Suspended
- (I) Ineligible
- (W) Walk-on
- Injured
- Current redshirt

== Schedule and results ==
Date time, TV	Rank^{#}	Opponent^{#}	Result	Record	Site (attendance) city, state
Regular season
Dec 1, 1992*		at Fordham	W 85–59	1–0	Rose Hill Gym; Bronx, New York
Dec 5, 1992*		at Eastern Michigan	W 68–60	2–0	Bowen Field House; Ypsilanti, Michigan
Dec 8, 1992*		at Providence	W 81–79	3–0	Providence Civic Center; Providence, Rhode Island
Dec 15, 1992*		at Wake Forest	L 65–69	3–1	Lawrence Joel Coliseum; Winston-Salem, North Carolina
Dec 23, 1992*		Hartford	W 98–67	4–1	Keaney Gymnasium; Kingston, Rhode Island
Dec 29, 1992*		vs. Alabama	L 78–79	4–2	
Dec 30, 1992*		vs. Harvard	W 80–67	5–2	
Jan 2, 1993*		at No. 22 Arizona	L 79–87	5–3	McKale Center; Tucson, Arizona
Jan 6, 1993*		Iona	W 87–80	6–3	Keaney Gymnasium; Kingston, Rhode Island
Jan 9, 1993*		at Northeastern	W 80–72	7–3	Matthews Arena; Boston, Massachusetts
Jan 11, 1993		at West Virginia	W 86–82	8–3 (1–0)	WVU Coliseum; Morgantown, West Virginia
Jan 14, 1993		St. Bonaventure	W 96–82	9–3 (2–0)	Keaney Gymnasium; Kingston, Rhode Island
Jan 16, 1993*		Hofstra	W 80–68	10–3	Keaney Gymnasium; Kingston, Rhode Island
Jan 19, 1993		at UMass	L 72–84	10–4 (2–1)	Curry Hicks Cage; Amherst, Massachusetts
Jan 23, 1993		at George Washington	L 75–88	10–5 (2–2)	Charles E. Smith Center; Washington, D.C.
Jan 25, 1993*		Brown	W 90–50	11–5	Keaney Gymnasium; Kingston, Rhode Island
Jan 28, 1993		at Temple	L 67–69	11–6 (2–3)	McGonigle Hall; Philadelphia, Pennsylvania
Jan 30, 1993		Rutgers	W 100–81	12–6 (3–3)	Keaney Gymnasium; Kingston, Rhode Island
Feb 3, 1993		Saint Joseph's	L 65–74	12–7 (3–4)	Keaney Gymnasium; Kingston, Rhode Island
Feb 7, 1993		West Virginia	W 69–59	13–7 (4–4)	Keaney Gymnasium; Kingston, Rhode Island
Feb 13, 1993		at St. Bonaventure	W 83–81	14–7 (5–4)	Reilly Center; St. Bonaventure, New York
Feb 15, 1993		Temple	W 67–65	15–7 (6–4)	Keaney Gymnasium; Kingston, Rhode Island
Feb 20, 1993		vs. No. 19 UMass	W 71–68	16–7 (7–4)	
Feb 23, 1993		at Rutgers	L 63–67	16–8 (7–5)	Louis Brown Athletic Center; Piscataway, New Jersey
Feb 27, 1993		at Saint Joseph's	L 80–84	16–9 (7–6)	Hagan Arena; Philadelphia, Pennsylvania
Mar 4, 1993		George Washington	W 75–72	17–9 (8–6)	Keaney Gymnasium; Kingston, Rhode Island
Atlantic 10 tournament
Mar 7, 1993*		vs. George Washington; Quarterfinals	W 86–75	18–9	The Palestra; Philadelphia, Pennsylvania
Mar 8, 1993*		vs. No. 20 UMass; Semifinals	L 50–76	18–10	The Palestra; Philadelphia, Pennsylvania
NCAA tournament
Mar 18, 1993*	(8 E)	vs. (9 E) No. 22 Purdue; First round	W 74–68	19–10	Lawrence Joel Coliseum; Winston-Salem, North Carolina
Mar 20, 1993*	(8 E)	vs. (1 E) No. 4 North Carolina; Second round	L 67–112	19–11	Lawrence Joel Coliseum; Winston-Salem, North Carolina
*Non-conference game. ^{#}Rankings from AP poll. (#) Tournament seedings in parentheses. E=East. All times are in EST.
