= Ray Wilson (basketball) =

American basketball coach (1932–2015)

Biographical details
- Born: June 28, 1932; Newport, Rhode Island, U.S.
- Died: September 15, 2015 (aged 83); Tavares, Florida, U.S.
- Education: Boston University

Coaching career (HC unless noted)
- 1961–1968: Roosevelt HS (NY)
- 1968–1976: UMass (assistant)
- 1976–1977: Davidson (assistant)
- 1977–1979: UMass (assistant)
- 1979–1981: UMass

Head coaching record
- Overall: 5–48 (.094) (college); 86–37 (.699) (high school)

Raymond B. "Speed" Wilson Jr. (June 28, 1932 – September 11, 2015) was an American basketball coach who coached Naismith Basketball Hall of Famer Julius Erving at Roosevelt High School and was head coach of the UMass Minutemen basketball team from 1979 to 1981.

== Early life ==
Wilson was born in Newport, Rhode Island and graduated from Rogers High School in 1951. After serving in the United States Army, he attended Boston University, where he was a member of the Boston University Terriers men's basketball. He graduated in 1958.

== Coaching ==
From 1961 to 1968, Wilson compiled a 86–37 record as the head coach at Roosevelt High School in Roosevelt, New York. He followed his star player, Julius Erving, to UMass, where Wilson served as an assistant under his former BU teammate Jack Leaman. Wilson was a finalist for the head coaching jobs at Hawaii, Brown, Colby. In 1976, he became an assistant coach at Davidson. He was the first fulltime black coach in the program's history. He left after one season and returned to UMass.

Leaman retired following the 1978–79 season and Wilson was chosen to succeed him. He was the program's first black head coach one of only six black head coaches in NCAA Division I men's basketball that season. He won only five games in his two seasons as head coach, with four of those wins coming against Division II teams.

== Later life ==
Wilson spent many years as an executive with the Erving Group, which oversaw Julius Erving's business holdings. He died on September 11, 2015.
