= 1992–93 Florida State Seminoles men's basketball team =

American college basketball season

1992–93 Florida State Seminoles men's basketball

NCAA tournament, Elite Eight
- Conference: Atlantic Coast Conference

Ranking
- Coaches: No. 7
- AP: No. 11
- Record: 25–10 (12–4 ACC)
- Head coach: Pat Kennedy (7th season)
- Home arena: Tallahassee-Leon County Civic Center

1992–93 ACC men's basketball standings
	Conf.				Overall
Team	W		L	PCT	W		L	PCT
No. 4 North Carolina	14	–	2	.875	34	–	4	.895
No. 11 Florida State	12	–	4	.750	25	–	10	.714
No. 10 Duke	10	–	6	.625	24	–	8	.750
No. 16 Wake Forest	10	–	6	.625	21	–	9	.700
Virginia	9	–	7	.563	21	–	10	.677
No. 18 Georgia Tech †	8	–	8	.500	19	–	11	.633
Clemson	5	–	11	.313	17	–	13	.567
Maryland	2	–	14	.125	12	–	16	.429
NC State	2	–	14	.125	8	–	19	.296
† 1993 ACC tournament winner Rankings from AP poll

The 1992–93 Florida State Seminoles men's basketball team represented Florida State University as members of the Atlantic Coast Conference during the 1992–93 NCAA Division I men's basketball season. Led by head coach Pat Kennedy, and future NBA players Sam Cassell, Doug Edwards, Bob Sura, and Charlie Ward, the Seminoles reached the Elite Eight of the NCAA tournament. The team finished the season 25–10, 12–4 in ACC play to finish in second place. They lost in the quarterfinals of the ACC Tournament to Clemson. They received an at-large bid to the NCAA tournament at the No. 3 seed in the South East region. They defeated Evansville and Tulane to advance to the Sweet Sixteen. In the Sweet Sixteen, they defeated Western Kentucky before losing to No. 2-ranked Kentucky in the Elite Eight.

== Roster ==
1992–93 Florida State Seminoles men's basketball team
Players
Coaches

Pos.	#	Name	Height	Weight	Year	Previous school	Hometown
G	3	Bob Sura	6 ft 5 in (1.96 m)	195 lb (88 kg)	So	G.A.R. Memorial	Wilkes-Barre, Pennsylvania
G	4	Chuck Graham	6 ft 3 in (1.91 m)	190 lb (86 kg)	Sr	Richmond Academy	Augusta, Georgia
G/F	5	Ray Donald	6 ft 8 in (2.03 m)	205 lb (93 kg)	So	Washington	Pensacola, Florida
G	10	Sam Cassell	6 ft 3 in (1.91 m)	195 lb (88 kg)	Sr	San Jacinto JC	Baltimore, Maryland
G	11	Lorenzo Hands	6 ft 3 in (1.91 m)	195 lb (88 kg)	Sr	Twin Lakes	West Palm Beach, Florida
G	12	Charlie Ward	6 ft 1 in (1.85 m)	190 lb (86 kg)	Jr	Central	Thomasville, Georgia
F	21	Derrick Carroll	6 ft 6 in (1.98 m)	215 lb (98 kg)	Fr	Eau Claire	Columbia, South Carolina
F	32	Doug Edwards	6 ft 9 in (2.06 m)	220 lb (100 kg)	Sr	Miami Senior	Miami, Florida
F	33	Byron Wells	6 ft 10 in (2.08 m)	235 lb (107 kg)	Sr	King	Tampa, Florida
F/C	34	Rodney Dobard	6 ft 9 in (2.06 m)	210 lb (95 kg)	Sr	Atlantic	Delray Beach, Florida

Head coach

- Pat Kennedy (King's College)

Assistant coach(es)

- Kenny Williamson
- David Zimroth
- Tom Carlson

Legend

- (C) Team captain
- (S) Suspended
- (I) Ineligible
- (W) Walk-on
- Injured
- Current redshirt

== Schedule and results ==
Date time, TV	Rank^{#}	Opponent^{#}	Result	Record	Site city, state
Regular Season
Nov 18, 1992*	No. 9	Siena; Preseason NIT	W 89–80	1–0	Tallahassee-Leon County Civic Center (7,113); Tallahassee, FL
Nov 19, 1992*	No. 9	No. 19 Iowa State; Preseason NIT	W 109–86	2–0	Tallahassee-Leon County Civic Center (7,919); Tallahassee, FL
Nov 25, 1992*	No. 7	vs. No. 4 Indiana; Preseason NIT Semifinal	L 78–81 ^{OT}	2–1	Madison Square Garden (12,641); New York, NY
Nov 21, 1992*	No. 7	vs. No. 24 UCLA; Preseason NIT 3rd Place Game	L 83–86	2–2	Madison Square Garden (14,338); New York, NY
Dec 2, 1992*	No. 11	No. 19 UMass	W 67–64	3–2	Tallahassee-Leon County Civic Center (7,111); Tallahassee, FL
Dec 15, 1992*	No. 10	at Duquesne	L 84–91	3–3	A.J. Palumbo Center (5,115); Pittsburgh, PA
Dec 19, 1992*	No. 10	vs. UNC Charlotte; Milk Classic	W 63–59	4–3	(6,873); Orlando, FL
Dec 20, 1992*	No. 10	vs. Temple; Milk Classic	W 91–80 ^{OT}	5–3	(6,937); Orlando, FL
Dec 22, 1992*	No. 18	Arkansas-Little Rock	W 95–64	6–3	Tallahassee-Leon County Civic Center; Tallahassee, FL
Dec 28, 1992*	No. 18	Maryland-Baltimore County	W 109–80	7–3	Tallahassee-Leon County Civic Center; Tallahassee, FL
Dec 30, 1992*	No. 18	South Florida	W 94–73	8–3	Tallahassee-Leon County Civic Center; Tallahassee, FL
Jan 2, 1993*	No. 18	Florida	L 86–89	8–4	Tallahassee-Leon County Civic Center; Tallahassee, FL
Jan 6, 1993	No. 23	at No. 25 Virginia	L 76–80	8–5 (0–1)	University Hall (University of Virginia); Charlottesville, VA
Jan 9, 1993	No. 23	at Wake Forest	W 74–72	9–5 (1–1)	Lawrence Joel Coliseum; Winston-Salem, NC
Jan 13, 1993		Maryland	W 105–85	10–5 (2–1)	Tallahassee-Leon County Civic Center; Tallahassee, FL
Jan 16, 1993		NC State	W 70–54	11–5 (3–1)	Tallahassee-Leon County Civic Center; Tallahassee, FL
Jan 20, 1993		at Clemson	W 89–71	12–5 (4–1)	Littlejohn Coliseum; Clemson, SC
Jan 24, 1993		No. 6 Duke	W 89–88 ^{OT}	13–5 (5–1)	Tallahassee-Leon County Civic Center; Tallahassee, FL
Jan 27, 1993	No. 19	at No. 3 North Carolina	L 77–82	13–6 (5–2)	Dean Smith Center; Chapel Hill, NC
Jan 31, 1993	No. 19	No. 18 Georgia Tech	W 96–77	14–6 (6–2)	Tallahassee-Leon County Civic Center; Tallahassee, FL
Feb 2, 1993*	No. 12	at Jacksonville	W 92–77	15–6	Jacksonville Memorial Coliseum; Jacksonville, FL
Feb 6, 1993*	No. 12	at Connecticut	W 86–74	16–6	Harry A. Gampel Pavilion; Storrs, CT
Feb 8, 1993	No. 10	No. 24 Virginia	W 99–84	17–6 (7–2)	Tallahassee-Leon County Civic Center; Tallahassee, FL
Feb 10, 1993	No. 10	No. 9 Wake Forest	W 111–94	18–6 (8–2)	Tallahassee-Leon County Civic Center; Tallahassee, FL
Feb 13, 1993	No. 10	at Maryland	W 87–84	19–6 (9–2)	Cole Fieldhouse; College Park, MD
Feb 17, 1993	No. 9	at NC State	W 72–71	20–6 (10–2)	Reynolds Coliseum; Raleigh, NC
Feb 20, 1993	No. 9	Clemson	W 102–92	21–6 (11–2)	Tallahassee-Leon County Civic Center; Tallahassee, FL
Feb 24, 1993	No. 6	at No. 9 Duke	L 75–98	21–7 (11–3)	Cameron Indoor Stadium; Durham, NC
Feb 27, 1993	No. 6	No. 3 North Carolina	L 76–86	21–8 (11–4)	Tallahassee-Leon County Civic Center; Tallahassee, FL
Mar 4, 1993	No. 11	at Georgia Tech	W 83–82	22–8 (12–4)	Alexander Memorial Coliseum; Atlanta, GA
ACC Tournament
Mar 12, 1993*	No. 10	vs. Clemson; ACC Tournament Quarterfinal	L 75–87	22–9	Charlotte Coliseum (23,532); Charlotte, NC
NCAA Tournament
Mar 18, 1993*	(3 SE) No. 11	vs. (14 SE) Evansville; First Round	W 82–70	23–9	Amway Arena (14,410); Orlando, FL
Mar 20, 1993*	(3 SE) No. 11	vs. (11 SE) Tulane; Second Round	W 94–63	24–9	Amway Arena (14,410); Orlando, FL
Mar 25, 1993*	(3 SE) No. 11	vs. (7 SE) No. 20 Western Kentucky	W 81–78 ^{OT}	25–9	Charlotte Coliseum (22,876); Charlotte, NC
Mar 27, 1993*	(3 SE) No. 11	vs. (1 SE) No. 2 Kentucky; Southeast Regional Final	L 81–106	25–10	Charlotte Coliseum (22,876); Charlotte, NC
*Non-conference game. ^{#}Rankings from AP. (#) Tournament seedings in parentheses. SE=Southeast. All times are in Eastern.

== Awards and honors ==
- Doug Edwards – AP Honorable Mention All-American
- Bob Sura – AP Honorable Mention All-American

== Team Players in the 1993 NBA draft ==
Round	Pick	Player	NBA club
1	15	Doug Edwards	Atlanta Hawks
1	24	Sam Cassell	Houston Rockets
