= Ron Gerlufsen =

American basketball and coach (born 1951)

Biographical details
- Born: November 10, 1951 (age 74)

Coaching career (HC unless noted)
- 1973–1981: Manasquan HS
- 1981–1983: UMass (assistant)
- 1983–1988: UMass
- 1988–1993: Shepherd
- 1994–1996: SCAD
- 1997–2000: Fort Myers HS
- 2000–2006: Brick Memorial HS

Ron Gerlufsen (born November 10, 1951) is an American educator and basketball coach who was the head men's basketball coach at UMass (1983–1988), Shepherd College (1988–1993), and the Savannah College of Art and Design (1994–1996). He also had a long career as a coach and educator in New Jersey.

== Early career ==
Gerlufsen played point guard at Matawan Regional High School and East Stroudsburg State College. From 1973 to 1981, he led Manasquan High School to 98 wins and two Shore Conference Class B South titles.

== College coaching ==
In 1981, he became an assistant basketball coach at UMass under Tom McLaughlin. McLaughlin resigned unexpectedly in 1983 and Gerlufsen was promoted to head coach. He compiled a 55-84 record over five seasons and resigned in March 1988. That August, he was named head coach at Shepherd College in Shepherdstown, West Virginia. He went 70–72 in five seasons and was not retained after his contract expired in 1993. Gerlufsen filed multiple lawsuits Shepherd's president seeking reinstatement and financial damages, but they were all dismissed. He then spent two seasons as the head coach at the Savannah College of Art and Design.

== Return to high school ==
In 1997, Gerlufsen returned to the high school ranks as the head coach at Fort Myers Senior High School in Fort Myers, Florida. In 2000, he returned to New Jersey to coach the boy's basketball and tennis teams at Brick Memorial High School in Brick Township. He led the basketball team to its first Shore Conference Class A South title and an appearance in the NJSIAA Central Jersey Group IV final. His tennis teams made the NJSIAA and Shore Conference tournaments in all four seasons he coached them. He left coaching in 2006 to become a vice principal at Brick Memorial. He then served as principal at Warren H. Wolf Elementary School from its establishment in 2013 until his retirement in 2017.
