= 1992–93 UMass Minutemen basketball team =

American college basketball season

1992–93 UMass Minutemen men's basketball
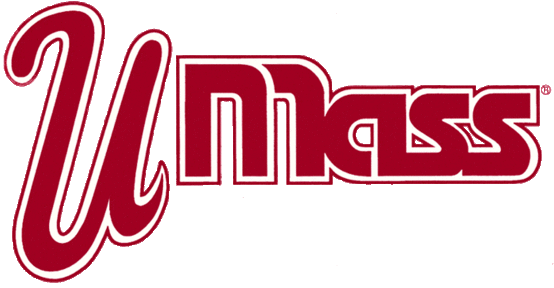

Atlantic 10 Regular Season Champions Atlantic 10 tournament champions

NCAA tournament, Round of 32
- Conference: Atlantic 10 Conference

Ranking
- Coaches: No. 22
- AP: No. 14
- Record: 24-7 (11-3 A-10)
- Head coach: John Calipari (5th season)
- Assistant coaches: Bruiser Flint; Bill Bayno; John Robic
- Home arena: Curry Hicks Cage (until 1/29/1993); William D. Mullins Memorial Center (from 2/4/1993)

1992–93 Atlantic 10 men's basketball standings
	Conf.				Overall
Team	W		L	PCT	W		L	PCT
No. 14 UMass †	11	–	3	.786	24	–	7	.774
George Washington	8	–	6	.571	21	–	9	.700
Rhode Island	8	–	6	.571	19	–	11	.633
Saint Joseph's	8	–	6	.571	18	–	11	.621
Temple	8	–	6	.571	20	–	13	.606
West Virginia	7	–	7	.500	17	–	12	.586
Rutgers	6	–	8	.429	13	–	15	.464
St. Bonaventure	0	–	14	.000	10	–	17	.370
† 1993 Atlantic 10 Tournament winner Rankings from AP Poll

The 1992–93 UMass Minutemen basketball team represented the University of Massachusetts Amherst during the 1992–93 NCAA Division I men's basketball season. The Minutemen, led by fifth year head coach John Calipari were members of the Atlantic 10 Conference. They finished the season 24–7, 11–3 in A-10 play to finish in first place. It also marked the last season home games would be regularly played at Curry Hicks Cage.

== Roster ==
Number	Name	Position	Height	Weight	Year	Hometown
3	Dana Dingle	Forward	6–6	200	Freshman	Bronx, New York
5	Giddel Padilla	Guard	6–4	170	Sophomore	Springfield, Massachusetts
10	Mike Williams	Guard	6–2	175	Sophomore	Hartford, Connecticut
11	Craig Berry	Guard	6-1	185	Junior	Cambridge, Massachusetts
12	Chris Robinson	Guard	6-2	195	Junior	New York, New York
14	Derek Kellogg	Guard	6-3	185	Sophomore	Springfield, Massachusetts
15	Lou Roe	Forward	6-7	210	Sophomore	Atlantic City, New Jersey
22	Tony Barbee	Forward/Guard	6–6	210	Senior	Indianapolis, Indiana
23	Rigoberto Nuñez	Forward	6–7	182	Freshman	Lawrence, Massachusetts
24	Jerome Malloy	Guard	6–4	180	Sophomore	Waterbury, Connecticut
31	Harper Williams	Forward	6–7	215	Senior	Bridgeport, Connecticut
33	Jeff Meyer	Center	7–2	225	Sophomore	Wausau, Wisconsin
40	Ted Cottrell	Center/Forward	6–9	210	Freshman	Annapolis, Maryland
42	Kennard Robinson	Forward/Center	6–10	215	Senior	Bronx, New York

== Schedule ==
Date time, TV	Rank^{#}	Opponent^{#}	Result	Record	Site city, state
Regular season
Dec 2, 1992*	No. 19	at No. 11 Florida State; Preseason NIT	L 64-67	0–1	Donald L. Tucker Civic Center; Tallahassee, FL
Dec 5, 1992*	No. 19	Central Connecticut State	W 78–52	1–1	Curry Hicks Cage; Amherst, MA
Dec 8, 1992*	No. 23	at Siena	W 70–58	2–1	Knickerbocker Arena; Albany, NY
Dec 12, 1992*	No. 23	at No. 11 Oklahoma	L 83–93	2–2	Lloyd Noble Center; Norman, OK
Dec 28, 1992*		vs. Holy Cross; Abdow's Classic	W 81–66	3–2	Springfield Civic Center; Springfield, MA
Dec 29, 1992		at South Carolina; Abdow's Classic	W 84–66	4–2	Springfield Civic Center; Springfield, MA
Jan 2, 1993*		at New Hampshire	W 75–61	5–2	Lundholm Gym; Durham, NH
Jan 5, 1993*	No. 22	Boston University	W 90–42	6–2	Curry Hicks Cage; Amherst, MA
Jan 7, 1993*	No. 22	No. 16 Cincinnati	L 53–64	6–3	Springfield Civic Center; Springfield, MA
Jan 9, 1993	No. 22	at Temple	L 44–52	6–4 (0–1)	McGonigle Hall; Philadelphia, PA
Jan 12, 1993		at Rutgers	W 82–78	7–4 (1–1)	Louis Brown Athletic Center; Piscataway, NJ
Jan 16, 1993		at George Washington	W 76–68	8–4 (2–1)	Curry Hicks Cage; Amherst, MA
Jan 19, 1993		Rhode Island	W 84–72	9–4 (3–1)	Curry Hicks Cage; Amherst, MA
Jan 21, 1993		Temple	W 52–50	10–4 (4–1)	Curry Hicks Cage; Amherst, MA
Jan 24, 1993*		vs. DePaul	W 79–69	11–4	Worcester Centrum; Worcester, MA
Jan 29, 1993		Southwestern Louisiana	W 84–74	12–4	Curry Hicks Cage; Amherst, MA
Jan 31, 1993		at St. Bonaventure	W 93–78	13–4 (5–1)	Reilly Center; Olean, NY
Feb 4, 1993		West Virginia	W 64–59 ^{OT}	14–4 (6–1)	Mullins Center; Amherst, MA
Feb 6, 1993		Rutgers	W 82–67	15–4 (7–1)	Mullins Center; Amherst, MA
Feb 11, 1993	No. 22	at Saint Joseph's	W 81–69	16–4 (8–1)	Alumni Memorial Fieldhouse; Philadelphia, PA
Feb 13, 1993	No. 22	George Washington	W 68–65	17–4 (9–1)	Charles E. Smith Center; Washington, DC
Feb 18, 1993*	No. 19	at Buffalo	W 96–67	18–4	Alumni Arena; Amherst, NY
Feb 20, 1993	No. 19	at Rhode Island	L 68–71	18–5 (9–2)	Providence Civic Center; Providence, RI
Feb 27, 1993	No. 21	at West Virginia	L 54–79	18–6 (9–3)	WVU Coliseum; Morgantown, WV
Mar 1, 1993	No. 23	St. Bonaventure	W 86–62	19–6 (10–3)	Mullins Center; Amherst, MA
Mar 4, 1993	No. 23	Saint Joseph's	W 61–43	20–6 (11–3)	Mullins Center; Amherst, MA
1993 Atlantic 10 men's basketball tournament
Mar 7, 1993	(1) No. 23	vs. (8) St. Bonaventure; Quarterfinals	W 75–62	21–6	The Palestra; Philadelphia, PA
Mar 8, 1993	(1) No. 20	vs. (5) Rhode Island; Semifinals	W 76–50	22–6	The Palestra; Philadelphia, PA
Mar 11, 1993	(1) No. 20	(3) Temple; Championship	W 69–61	23–6	Mullins Center; Amherst, MA
1993 NCAA Division I men's basketball tournament
Mar 19, 1993*	(3 E) No. 14	vs. (14 E) Penn; First Round	W 54–50	24–6	Carrier Dome; Syracuse, NY
Mar 21, 1993*	(3 E) No. 14	vs. (6 E) Virginia; Second Round	L 56–71	24–7	Carrier Dome; Syracuse, NY
*Non-conference game. ^{#}Rankings from AP Poll. (#) Tournament seedings in parentheses. All times are in Eastern Time.
