= UMass Minutemen basketball =

Basketball team

UMass Minutemen Basketball
2026–27 UMass Minutemen basketball team
- University: University of Massachusetts Amherst
- First season: 1908–09; 118 years ago
- Head coach: Frank Martin (4th season)
- Location: Amherst, Massachusetts
- Arena: William D. Mullins Memorial Center (capacity: 9,493)
- Conference: MAC
- Nickname: Minutemen
- Colors: Maroon and white
- Student section: The Militia
- All-time record: 1,385–1,260 (.524)

NCAA Division I tournament Final Four
- 1996*
Other NCAA Division I tournament results
Elite Eight	1995, 1996*
Sweet Sixteen	1992, 1995, 1996*
Appearances	1962, 1992, 1993, 1994, 1995, 1996*, 1997, 1998, 2014

Conference tournament champions
- 1992, 1993, 1994, 1995, 1996

Conference regular-season champions
- 1962, 1968, 1969, 1970, 1971, 1973, 1974, 1975, 1976, 1992, 1993, 1994, 1995, 1996, 2007

Conference division champions
- 1996

Uniforms
Home	Away
- * vacated by NCAA

The UMass Minutemen basketball team represents the University of Massachusetts Amherst in Amherst, Massachusetts, in NCAA Division I men's college basketball. They play their home games in the William D. Mullins Memorial Center. The Minutemen currently compete in the Mid-American Conference. UMass reached the Final Four at the 1996 NCAA tournament, its best finish at the NCAA tournament in program history.

== History ==
The men's basketball program has a history of over 100 years. The Minutemen, as they have been called since 1972, celebrated their 100th season in 2008–09. Though the program's first game was played on January 10, 1900, there were several years in which no team was assembled.

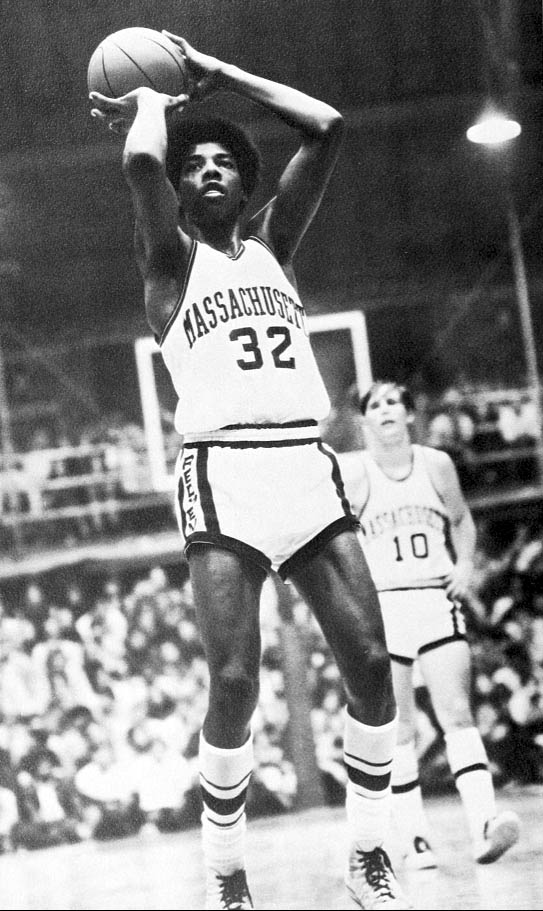
Julius "Dr. J" Erving at UMass.

The program's first coach was Harold M. Gore, who in 11 seasons compiled a record of 85–53 (.616 win percentage), highlighted by a 12–2 season in 1925–26. In 1933–34, Massachusetts was the only undefeated team in men's college basketball, going 12–0. For the 1948–49 season, Massachusetts joined the Yankee Conference to mark the first time they participated in conference play. UMass would go on to be 10-time champions of the Yankee Conference.

The 1960s and 1970s were prosperous for the program. The 1961–62 team went 15–9 and participated in the NCAA tournament for the first time in program history. They would go on to win 4 Yankee Conference titles in the 1960s, and played in the NIT at the end of the 1969–70 season. Though not a nationally recognized name, the program's coach with the most wins was Jack Leaman. Leaman guided Massachusetts to 217 wins, and coached players including Julius Erving, Al Skinner, Rick Pitino and Tom McLaughlin. The program compiled a record of 142–103 (.580) in the 1960s. The 1969–70 team featured Julius Erving. In his first game with the varsity team, a 90–85 win over Providence College, Erving scored 27 points and grabbed 28 rebounds.

In the first eight seasons of the 1970s, the Redmen/Minutemen compiled a record of 152–65 (.700). They won 5 Yankee Conference titles, and played in 5 NITs (the Yankee Conference did not have an NCAA tournament automatic bid). The early 1970s teams featured players such as Erving, Al Skinner, and Rick Pitino. Jack Leaman, who coached the team for 13 seasons, hung it up after the 1978–79 season, with a record of 217–126 (.632). Though Leaman's last season as coach of the men's team was 1978–79, he remained a key part of the UMass Athletic Department until he died in 2004.

=== John Calipari era 1988–1996 ===
The Minutemen fell on hard times in the late 1970s and 1980s, but would rebound under the direction of rookie coach John Calipari, perhaps the school's most recognizable coach, who took the head coaching job in 1988. Calipari took over a program that was on a streak of 10-straight losing seasons and had not been to the NCAA tournament since 1962. Calipari led UMass to the NIT in his second season as head coach. In his fourth season, UMass won both the A-10 regular season and tournament championships. Over the next few seasons, Calipari took the team to new heights and frequent #1 rankings in the AP weekly poll. In 1996, the Minutemen reached the Final Four for the first time. After the 1995–96 season, Calipari left UMass for the NBA as the new head coach of the New Jersey Nets. The 1990s were the defining decade for UMass basketball. Calipari helped the Minutemen become A-10 Tournament Champs five consecutive times (1992, 1993, 1994, 1995, 1996), and appeared in the NCAA tournament seven times, including two appearances in the Elite Eight (1995, 1996) and a Final Four appearance (1996), the only appearance ever for the Minutemen. However, NCAA sanctions stripped the Minutemen of their 1996 NCAA tournament victories. The sanctions, based on star Marcus Camby admitting he took money, clothes, and jewelry from an agent during the season, removed the Final Four from the record books. Additionally, 45% of tournament revenue had to be returned to the NCAA. Camby reimbursed the school for the $151,617 in lost revenue.

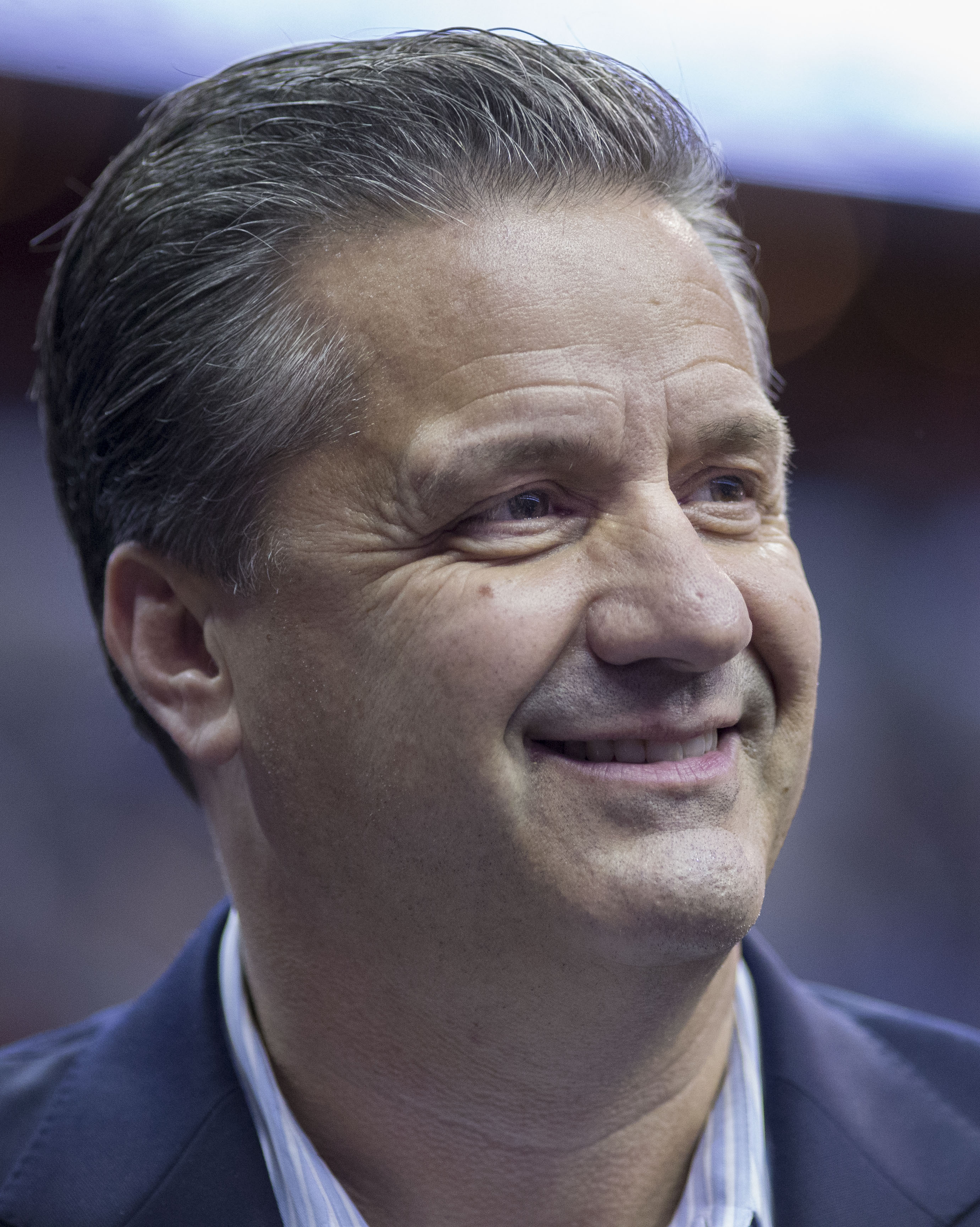
Coach John Calipari (1988–1996)

After Calipari resigned in 1996, his associate Bruiser Flint coached from 1996–2001, and Steve Lappas coached from 2001–2005.

=== Travis Ford era 2005–2008 ===
In 2005, Travis Ford replaced Lappas. Though the Minutemen struggled with a 13–15 record in Ford's first season of 2005–06, he quickly improved the team in the next two seasons. In 2006–07, the Minutemen were co-champions of the Atlantic 10 (along with Xavier), reached the second round of the NIT, and finished with a record of 24–9. In 2007–08, the Minutemen reached the NIT championship game where they lost to Ohio State 92–85 and finished with a record of 25–11. Following the 2007–08 season, his third with the Minutemen, he left to take the head coaching vacancy at Oklahoma State.

=== Derek Kellogg era 2008–2017 ===
On April 23, 2008, former Minutemen player Derek Kellogg returned to Amherst and became the 21st coach of the program. In 2011–12 the Minutemen appeared in the NIT after a successful season with a 22–11 record, reaching the semifinals, where they lost to Stanford. The Minutemen were again invited to the NIT in following the 2012–13.

The 2013–14 season was a success as the Minutemen qualified for the NCAA tournament for the first time in 16 years. The team started off the season 10–0 and then 16–1, while reaching as high as #13 in the AP poll, and #12 in the Coaches poll. However, the Minutemen, a #6 seed in the NCAA Tournament, were defeated in their first game against #11 seeded Tennessee.

In the 2014–15 season, the Minutemen regressed, finishing with a 17–15 overall record, and an eighth place finish in conference. The team also had sub-.500 seasons in each of the next two, and Kellogg was fired on March 9, 2017.

=== Matt McCall era 2017–2022 ===
Shortly after Kellogg was fired, the school announced that Winthrop head coach Pat Kelsey had been hired as the new head coach at UMass. However, shortly before the press conference to announce his hiring, Kelsey announced he would not accept the position. On March 31, the school announced they had hired Chattanooga head coach Matt McCall.

McCall's five-year tenure at the school was not successful, and he was fired just before the end of the 2022 season. His overall record at UMass finished at 61–82, and the team failed to advance past the conference tournament's quarterfinal round in each of the five seasons.

=== Frank Martin era 2022–present ===
UMass announced it had hired former University of South Carolina head coach Frank Martin on March 25, 2022. In Martin's first season at the helm, the Minutemen finished 15–16 with a 6–12 mark in conference play, but the team improved in his second, finishing with a 20–11 overall record, and a fourth-place conference finish at 11–7. Prior to the 2025-26 season, UMass left the Atlantic 10 conference and rejoined the Mid-American Conference (MAC) as a full member.

== Rivalries ==
Through 2024, Massachusetts and the Rhode Island Rams have played over 160 times, and at least once a year every year since 1950. The Atlantic 10 regularly pairs UMass and URI in a home-and-home series each season.

Starting in 1995, Massachusetts and Boston College played annually for the Commonwealth Cup, in the "Commonwealth Classic". Following the 2011–2012 season (in which UMass defeated the Eagles 82–46 in Chestnut Hill), Boston College discontinued the series in part due to changes to the ACC conference schedule and canceled their return trip to Amherst in late 2012.

UMass and Temple had an intense rivalry in the 1990s, during which time the schools were coached by John Calipari and John Chaney. The two coaches had to be restrained from each other during a 3-overtime game in 1990. After a game in 1994, Chaney charged at Calipari during a post-game press conference, and in front of reporters and television cameras, threatened to kill Calipari.

From 1996 to 2005, Massachusetts and Connecticut played in the "Mass Mutual U-Game", a reference to the two schools' nicknames, UMass and UConn, respectively. UConn won nine of the ten games. UMass won the 2004 game, in which the Huskies were the defending national champions.

== Season-by-season results ==
UMass Minutemen History
Season	Head coach	Overall	Conf.	Postseason	Notes
Independent
1925–26	Kid Gore	12–2			
Mel Taube 1933–1936
1933–34	Mel Taube	12-0			
1934-35	Mel Taube	6-6			
1935-36	Mel Taube	2-12			
Yankee Conference
Lorin Ball 1946–1952
1946–47	Walter Hargesheheimer (0–7) Lorin Ball (4–5)	4–12			
1947–48	Lorin Ball	2–14			
1948–49	Lorin Ball	6–12			
1949–50	Lorin Ball	8–11			
1950–51	Lorin Ball	6–15			
1951–52	Lorin Ball	4–17			
Lorin Ball: 26–74 (.260)
Robert Curran 1952–1959
1952–53	Robert Curran	4–15			
1953–54	Robert Curran	13–9			
1954–55	Robert Curran	10–14			
1955–56	Robert Curran	17–6			
1956–57	Robert Curran	13–11			
1957–58	Robert Curran	13–12			
1958–59	Robert Curran	11–13			
Robert Curran: 81–80 (.503)
Matt Zunic 1959–1963
1959–60	Matt Zunic	14–10			
1960–61	Matt Zunic	16–10			
1961–62	Matt Zunic	15–9	8–2	NCAA first round	Yankee Regular season Champions
1962–63	Matt Zunic	12–12	6–4		
Matt Zunik: 57–41 (.582)
Johnny Orr 1963–1966
1963–64	Johnny Orr	15–9	5–5		
1964–65	Johnny Orr	13–11	8–2		
1965–66	Johnny Orr	11–13	5–5		
Johnny Orr: 39–33 (.542)
Jack Leaman 1966–1979
1966–67	Jack Leaman	11–14	7–3		
1967–68	Jack Leaman	14–11	8–2		Yankee Regular season Champions
1968–69	Jack Leaman	17–7	9–1		Yankee Regular season Champions
1969–70	Jack Leaman	18–7	8–2	NIT first round	Yankee Regular season Champions
1970–71	Jack Leaman	23–4	10–0	NIT first round	Yankee Regular season Champions
1971–72	Jack Leaman	14–12	6–4		
1972–73	Jack Leaman	20–7	10–2	NIT second round	Yankee Regular season Champions
1973–74	Jack Leaman	21–5	11–1	NIT first round	Yankee Regular season Champions
1974–75	Jack Leaman	18–8	10–2	NIT first round	Yankee Regular season Champions
1975–76	Jack Leaman	21–6	11–1		Yankee Regular season Champions
1976–77	Jack Leaman	20–11	3–4	NIT Quarterfinals	
Eastern Collegiate Basketball League
1977–78	Jack Leaman	15–12	5–5		
Eastern Athletic Association
1978–79	Jack Leaman	5–22	0–10		
Jack Leaman: 217–126 (.633)
Ray Wilson 1979–1981
1979–80	Ray Wilson	2–24	0–10		
1980–81	Ray Wilson	3–24	0–13		
Ray Wilson: 5–48 (.094)
Tom McLaughlin 1981–1982
1981–82	Tom McLaughlin	7–20	3–11		
Atlantic 10 Conference
1982–83	Tom McLaughlin	9–20	4–10		
Tom McLaughlin: 16–40 (.286)
Ron Gerlufsen 1983–1988
1983–84	Ron Gerlufsen	12–17	6–12		
1984–85	Ron Gerlufsen	13–15	9–9		
1985–86	Ron Gerlufsen	9–19	6–12		
1986–87	Ron Gerlufsen	11–16	7–11		
1987–88	Ron Gerlufsen	10–17	5–13		
Ron Gerlufsen: 55–84 (.396)
John Calipari 1988–1996
1988–89	John Calipari	10–18	5–13		
1989–90	John Calipari	17–14	10–8	NIT first round	
1990–91	John Calipari	20–13	10–8	NIT Fourth Place	
1991–92	John Calipari	30–5	13–3	NCAA Sweet Sixteen	A-10 Regular season and Tournament champions
1992–93	John Calipari	24–7	11–3	NCAA second round	A-10 Regular season and Tournament champions
1993–94	John Calipari	28–7	14–2	NCAA second round	A-10 Regular season and Tournament champions
1994–95	John Calipari	29–5	13–3	NCAA Elite Eight	A-10 Regular season and Tournament champions
1995–96	John Calipari	35–2	15–1	NCAA Final Four	A-10 Regular season and Tournament champions
John Calipari: 193–71 (.731)
Bruiser Flint 1996–2001
1996–97	Bruiser Flint	19–14	11–5	NCAA tournament first round	
1997–98	Bruiser Flint	21–11	12–4	NCAA tournament first round	
1998–99	Bruiser Flint	14–16	9–7		
1999–2000	Bruiser Flint	17–16	9–7	NIT first round	
2000–01	Bruiser Flint	15–15	11–5		
Bruiser Flint: 86–72 (.544)
Steve Lappas 2001–2005
2001–02	Steve Lappas	13–16	6–10		
2002–03	Steve Lappas	11–18	6–10		
2003–04	Steve Lappas	10–19	4–12		
2004–05	Steve Lappas	16–12	9–7		
Steve Lappas: 50–65 (.435)
Travis Ford 2005–2008
2005–06	Travis Ford	13–15	8–8		
2006–07	Travis Ford	24–9	13–3	NIT second round	
2007–08	Travis Ford	25–11	10–6	NIT Final	
Travis Ford: 62–35 (.639)
Derek Kellogg 2008–2017
2008–09	Derek Kellogg	12–18	7–9		
2009–10	Derek Kellogg	12–20	5–11		
2010–11	Derek Kellogg	15–15	7–9		
2011–12	Derek Kellogg	25–12	9–7	NIT semifinal	
2012–13	Derek Kellogg	21–12	9–7	NIT first round	
2013–14	Derek Kellogg	24–9	10–6	NCAA first round	
2014–15	Derek Kellogg	17–15	10–8		
2015–16	Derek Kellogg	14–18	6–12		
2016–17	Derek Kellogg	15–18	4–14		
Derek Kellogg: 155–137 (.531)
2017–18	Matt McCall	13–20	5–13		
2018–19	Matt McCall	11–21	4–14		
2019–20	Matt McCall	14–17	8–10		
2020–21	Matt McCall	8–7	6–4		
2021–22	Matt McCall	15–17	7–11		
Matt McCall: 61–82(.427)
2022–23	Frank Martin	15-16	6-12		
2023–24	Frank Martin	20-11	11-7		
Frank Martin: 11–6 (.647)
Overall Record: 1349–1219 (.525)

== Postseason results ==
=== NCAA tournament results ===
The Minutemen have appeared in the NCAA tournament nine times. Their combined record is 11–9. Their 1996 victories have been vacated by the NCAA thus their official tournament record is 7–8.

Year	Seed	Round	Opponent	Result
1962		First Round	NYU	L 50–70
1992	3	First Round; Second Round; Sweet Sixteen	(14) Fordham (6) Syracuse (2) Kentucky	W 85–58; W 77–71; L 77–87
1993	3	First Round; Second Round	(14) Penn (6) Virginia	W 54–50; L 56–71
1994	2	First Round; Second Round	(15) Southwest Texas State (10) Maryland	W 78–60; L 87–95
1995	2	First Round; Second Round; Sweet Sixteen; Elite Eight	(15) Saint Peter's (10) Stanford (6) Tulsa (4) Oklahoma State	W 68–51; W 75–53; W 76–51; L 54–68
1996*	1	First Round; Second Round; Sweet Sixteen; Elite Eight; Final Four	(16) UCF (9) Stanford (12) Arkansas (2) Georgetown (1) Kentucky	W 92–70; W 79–74; W 79–63; W 86–62; L 74–81
1997	11	First Round	(6) Louisville	L 57–65
1998	7	First Round	(10) Saint Louis	L 46–51
2014	6	Second Round	(11) Tennessee	L 67–86

* vacated by NCAA

=== NIT results ===
The Minutemen have appeared in the National Invitation Tournament (NIT) 13 times. Their combined record is 13–14.

Year	Round	Opponent	Result
1970	First Round	Marquette	L 55–62
1971	First Round	North Carolina	L 49–90
1973	First Round; Quarterfinals	Missouri; North Carolina	W 78–71; L 63–73
1974	First Round	Jacksonville	L 69–73^{OT}
1975	First Round	Manhattan	L 51–68
1977	First Round; Quarterfinals	Seton Hall; Villanova	W 86–85; L 71–81
1990	First Round	Maryland	L 81–91
1991	First Round; Second Round; Quarterfinals; Semifinals; 3rd Place Game	La Salle; Fordham; Siena; Stanford; Colorado	W 93–90; W 78–74; W 82–80; L 71–78; L 91–98
2000	First Round	Siena	L 65–66
2007	First Round; Second Round	Alabama; West Virginia	W 89–87; L 77–90
2008	First Round; Second Round; Quarterfinals; Semifinals; Finals	Stephen F. Austin; Akron; Syracuse; Florida; Ohio State	W 80–60; W 68–63; W 81–77; W 78–66; L 85–92
2012	First Round; Second Round; Quarterfinals; Semifinals	Mississippi State; Seton Hall; Drexel; Stanford	W 101–96^{2OT} W 77–67; W 72–70; L 74–84
2013	First Round	Stony Brook	L 58–71

== Prominent alumni ==
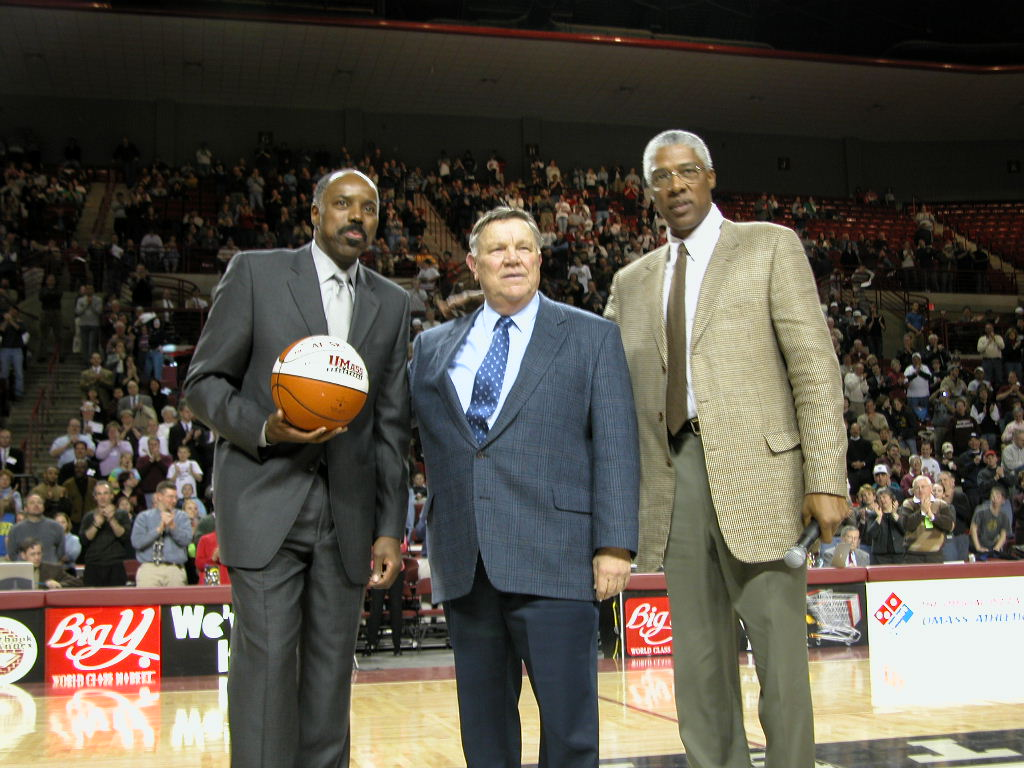
Al Skinner, Jack Leaman, and Julius Erving at the retirement ceremony for Skinner's UMass jersey No. 30

=== NBA players ===
Several Massachusetts alumni have gone on to play in the NBA:

- Marcus Camby
- Julius Erving
- Gary Forbes
- DeJon Jarreau
- Tony Gaffney
- Lari Ketner
- Stephane Lasme
- Lou Roe
- Al Skinner

=== International league players ===
- Raphiael Putney (born 1990), basketball player for Dorados de Chihuahua of the Liga Nacional de Baloncesto Profesional

=== Retired numbers ===
Five former players and one coach have had their names hung on banners in the rafters of the Mullins Center.

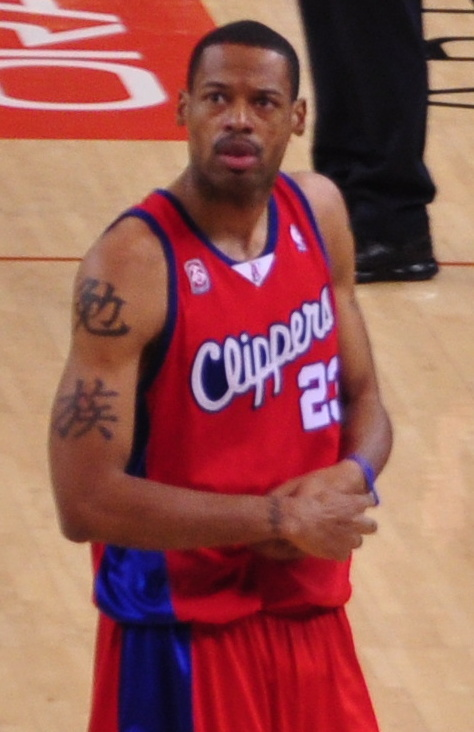
Marcus Camby was a consensus All-American in 1996

UMass Minutemen retired numbers
No.	Player	Player	Career	Yr. ret.	Ref.
15	Lou Roe	PF	1991–95	2004	
21	Marcus Camby	C	1993–96	2013	
30	Al Skinner	F	1971–1974	2003	
32	George Burke	PG	1954–1956		
32	Julius Erving	F	1968–1971	1988	
–	John Calipari	Coach	1988–1996	2015	

=== UMass Athletic Hall of Fame ===
Many former members of the basketball program have been elected into the school's Hall of Fame. Class years listed in parentheses.

- David Bartley (1956)
- George "Trigger" Burke (1956)
- Lou Bush (1934)
- John Calipari (coach)
- Marcus Camby (1996)
- Joe DiSarcina (1969)
- Ray Ellerbrook (1970)
- Frederick "Fritz" Ellert (1930)
- Julius Erving (1972)
- Jack Foley (1957)
- Harold "Kid" Gore (coach)
- Emory Grayson (1917)
- Doug Grutchfield (1961)
- Ned Larkin (1959)
- Jack Leaman (coach)
- Joseph Lojko (1934)
- Jim McCoy (1992)
- Edward McGrath (1949)
- Bill Prevey (1952)
- Lou Roe (1995)
- Al Skinner (1974)
- John Stewart (1936)
- Billy Tindall (1968)
- Rodger Twitchell (1964)
- Harper Williams (1993)
- Tim Edwards (1968)

The Hall is officially named "The George 'Trigger' Burke UMass Athletic Hall of Fame" in recognition of Burke's generous support of UMass Athletics and student scholarships.
