= 1993 Atlantic 10 men's basketball tournament =

- Classification: Division I
- Season: 1992–93
- Teams: 8
- Site: The Palestra (First and Second rounds); Philadelphia and Mullins Center (Championship); Amherst, Massachusetts
- Champions: Massachusetts (2nd title)
- Winning coach: John Calipari (2nd title)
- MVP: Harper Williams (Massachusetts)

1992–93 Atlantic 10 men's basketball standings
	Conf.				Overall
Team	W		L	PCT	W		L	PCT
No. 14 UMass †	11	–	3	.786	24	–	7	.774
George Washington	8	–	6	.571	21	–	9	.700
Rhode Island	8	–	6	.571	19	–	11	.633
Saint Joseph's	8	–	6	.571	18	–	11	.621
Temple	8	–	6	.571	20	–	13	.606
West Virginia	7	–	7	.500	17	–	12	.586
Rutgers	6	–	8	.429	13	–	15	.464
St. Bonaventure	0	–	14	.000	10	–	17	.370
† 1993 Atlantic 10 Tournament winner Rankings from AP Poll

The 1993 Atlantic 10 men's basketball tournament was played from March 7 to March 8, 1993, and March 11, 1993. The first two rounds were played at the Palestra in Philadelphia, Pennsylvania, while the final was played at the Mullins Center in Amherst, Massachusetts. The winner was named champion of the Atlantic 10 Conference and received an automatic bid to the 1993 NCAA Men's Division I Basketball Tournament. The University of Massachusetts won the tournament. George Washington, Rhode Island, and Temple also received bids to the NCAA Tournament. Harper Williams of Massachusetts was named the tournament's Most Outstanding Player for the second consecutive year. Future NBA players Eddie Jones (Temple), Aaron McKie (Temple), and Lou Roe (Massachusetts) were among those also named to the All-Championship Team.

== Bracket ==
Quarterfinals; Sunday, March 7 Palestra, Philadelphia, PA
1	UMass	75
8	St. Bonaventure	62
4	George Washington	75
5	Rhode Island	86
2	Saint Joseph's	71
7	Rutgers	70
3	Temple	80
6	West Virginia	53

Semifinals; Monday, March 8 Palestra
1	UMass	76
5	Rhode Island	50
2	Saint Joseph's	60
3	Temple	71

Final; Thursday, March 11; Mullins Center, Amherst, MA
1	UMass	69
3	Temple	61
