= 1993 ACC men's basketball tournament =

- Classification: Division I
- Season: 1992–93
- Teams: 9
- Site: Charlotte Coliseum; Charlotte, North Carolina
- Champions: Georgia Tech (3rd title)
- Winning coach: Bobby Cremins (3rd title)
- MVP: James Forrest (Georgia Tech)
- Television: Raycom-Jefferson Pilot, ESPN

1992–93 ACC men's basketball standings
	Conf.				Overall
Team	W		L	PCT	W		L	PCT
No. 4 North Carolina	14	–	2	.875	34	–	4	.895
No. 11 Florida State	12	–	4	.750	25	–	10	.714
No. 10 Duke	10	–	6	.625	24	–	8	.750
No. 16 Wake Forest	10	–	6	.625	21	–	9	.700
Virginia	9	–	7	.563	21	–	10	.677
No. 18 Georgia Tech †	8	–	8	.500	19	–	11	.633
Clemson	5	–	11	.313	17	–	13	.567
Maryland	2	–	14	.125	12	–	16	.429
NC State	2	–	14	.125	8	–	19	.296
† 1993 ACC tournament winner Rankings from AP poll

The 1993 Atlantic Coast Conference men's basketball tournament took place in Charlotte, North Carolina, at the second Charlotte Coliseum. The tournament marked the event's 40th anniversary. Georgia Tech won the tournament, defeating North Carolina, 77–75, in the championship game. North Carolina lost their second championship game in a row. James Forrest of Georgia Tech was named tournament MVP. The tournament was played with the backdrop of a rare March blizzard which raged across the southeastern United States. The semifinal game between North Carolina and Virginia was delayed during the second half by a storm-related power outage.

== Bracket ==
First round March 11
8	Maryland	76
9	NC State	55

Quarterfinals; March 12
1	#1 North Carolina	102
8	Maryland	66
4	#12 Wake Forest	57
5	Virginia	61
2	#10 Florida State	75
7	Clemson	87
3	#8 Duke	66
6	Georgia Tech	69

Semifinals; March 13
1	#1 North Carolina	74
5	Virginia	56
7	Clemson	61
6	Georgia Tech	69

Championship Game; March 14
1	#1 North Carolina	75
6	Georgia Tech	77

AP rankings at time of tournament
