= 1992–93 North Carolina Tar Heels men's basketball team =

American college basketball season

1992–93 North Carolina Tar Heels men's basketball

NCAA tournament National Champions Coaches Poll regular season champions ACC regular season champions

National Championship Game, W 77–71 vs. Michigan
- Conference: Atlantic Coast Conference

Ranking
- Coaches: No. 1
- AP: No. 4
- Record: 34–4 (14–2, 1st ACC)
- Head coach: Dean Smith (32nd season)
- Assistant coaches: Bill Guthridge (26th season); Phil Ford (5th season); Randy Wiel (5th season); Dave Hanners (4th season)
- Home arena: Dean Smith Center

1992–93 ACC men's basketball standings
	Conf.				Overall
Team	W		L	PCT	W		L	PCT
No. 4 North Carolina	14	–	2	.875	34	–	4	.895
No. 11 Florida State	12	–	4	.750	25	–	10	.714
No. 10 Duke	10	–	6	.625	24	–	8	.750
No. 16 Wake Forest	10	–	6	.625	21	–	9	.700
Virginia	9	–	7	.563	21	–	10	.677
No. 18 Georgia Tech †	8	–	8	.500	19	–	11	.633
Clemson	5	–	11	.313	17	–	13	.567
Maryland	2	–	14	.125	12	–	16	.429
NC State	2	–	14	.125	8	–	19	.296
† 1993 ACC tournament winner Rankings from AP poll

The 1992–93 North Carolina Tar Heels men's basketball team represented the University of North Carolina at Chapel Hill in the 1992-93 NCAA Division I men's basketball season as a member of the Atlantic Coast Conference. They finished the season 34–4 overall, won the ACC regular season title with a 14–2 record and won the 1993 national championship. They were coached by Dean Smith, who won his second national championship in his thirty-second season as head coach of the Tar Heels. They played their home games at the Dean Smith Center in Chapel Hill, North Carolina.

== Season summary ==
The 1992–93 team was led by George Lynch, Eric Montross, Brian Reese, Donald Williams, and Derrick Phelps. The Tar Heels started out with an 8–0 record and were ranked #5 in the country when they met #6 Michigan in the semi-finals of the Rainbow Classic. The Wolverines, led by the Fab Five in their sophomore season, won 79–78 to on a last-second shot. North Carolina bounced back with nine straight wins before losing back-to-back road games against unranked Wake Forest and #5 Duke. After seven more straight wins, the Tar Heels were ranked #1 heading into the last week of the regular season (their first #1 ranking since the start of the 1987–88 season). North Carolina beat #14 Wake Forest and #6 Duke to close out the regular season and clinch the top seed in the ACC tournament. North Carolina reached the tournament final, but the Tar heels, shorthanded due to an injury to point guard Derrick Phelps, lost 77–75 to Georgia Tech. Nonetheless, North Carolina was awarded the top seed in the East Regional of the NCAA tournament, defeating #16-seed East Carolina (85–65), #8-seed Rhode Island (112–67), #4-seed Arkansas (80–74), and #2-seed Cincinnati (75–68) to reach the final four in New Orleans.

In the national semi-finals, Smith's Tar Heels defeated his alma mater Kansas (coached by future North Carolina head coach Roy Williams) 78–68, setting up a rematch with the #3-ranked Michigan Wolverines in the finals.

The national title game was a see-saw battle throughout but is best remembered for Chris Webber's time out call with seconds left when Michigan had none remaining. The Wolverines were assessed a technical foul, and North Carolina subsequently won the game 77–71, giving Smith his second national championship.

== Personnel ==
1992–93 North Carolina Tar Heels men's basketball team
Players
Coaches

Pos.	#	Name	Height	Weight	Year	Hometown
G	24	Dante Calabria	6 ft 4 in (1.93 m)	—	Fr	Beaver Falls, PA
G/F	11	Scott Cherry	6 ft 5 in (1.96 m)	—	Sr	Ballston Spa, NY
G	4	Larry Davis	6 ft 3 in (1.91 m)	—	Fr	Denmark, SC
F	40	Ed Geth	6 ft 9 in (2.06 m)	—	Fr	Norfolk, VA
F	34	George Lynch	6 ft 8 in (2.03 m)	—	Sr	Roanoke, VA
C	00	Eric Montross	7 ft 0 in (2.13 m)	—	Jr	Indianapolis, IN
G	14	Derrick Phelps	6 ft 3 in (1.91 m)	—	Jr	Pleasantville, NY
F	31	Brian Reese	6 ft 6 in (1.98 m)	—	Jr	Bronx, NY
F	5	Henrik Rödl	6 ft 8 in (2.03 m)	—	Sr	Heusenstamm, Germany
F/C	33	Kevin Salvadori	7 ft 0 in (2.13 m)	—	Jr	Pittsburgh, PA
F	35	Travis Stephenson	6 ft 7 in (2.01 m)	—	Sr	Angier, NC
F	3	Pat Sullivan	6 ft 8 in (2.03 m)	—	Jr	Bogota, NJ
C	55	Matt Wenstrom	7 ft 1 in (2.16 m)	—	Sr	Katy, TX
G	21	Donald Williams	6 ft 3 in (1.91 m)	—	So	Garner, NC

Head coach

- Dean Smith

Assistant coach(es)

- Phil Ford
- Bill Guthridge
- Randy Wiel
- Dave Hanners

Legend

- (C) Team captain
- (S) Suspended
- (I) Ineligible
- (W) Walk-on
- Injured
- Current redshirt

== Schedule and results ==
Date time, TV	Rank^{#}	Opponent^{#}	Result	Record	High points	High rebounds	High assists	Site (attendance) city, state
December 1, 1992*	No. 7	Old Dominion	W 119–82	1–0	–	–	–	Dean Smith Center; Chapel Hill, NC
December 4, 1992*	No. 7	vs. South Carolina; Diet Pepsi Tournament of Champions	W 108–67	2–0	–	–	–	Charlotte Coliseum; Charlotte, NC
December 5, 1992*	No. 7	vs. Texas; Diet Pepsi Tournament of Champions	W 104–68	3–0	–	–	–	Charlotte Coliseum; Charlotte, NC
December 9, 1992*	No. 5	vs. Virginia Tech	W 78–62	4–0	–	–	–	Roanoke Civic Center; Roanoke, VA
December 13, 1992*	No. 5	Houston	W 84–76	5–0	–	–	–	Dean Smith Center; Chapel Hill, NC
December 20, 1992*	No. 5	at Butler	W 103–56	6–0	–	–	–	Hinkle Fieldhouse; Indianapolis, IN
December 22, 1992*	No. 5	at Ohio State	W 84–64	7–0	–	–	–	St. John Arena; Columbus, OH
December 28, 1992*	No. 5	vs. SW Louisiana; Rainbow Classic	W 80–59	8–0	–	–	–	Blaisdell Center; Honolulu, HI
December 29, 1992*	No. 5	No. 6 Michigan; Rainbow Classic	L 78–79	8–1	–	–	–	Blaisdell Center; Honolulu, HI
December 30, 1992*	No. 5	at Hawaii	W 101–84	9–1	–	–	–	Blaisdell Center; Honolulu, HI
January 4, 1993*	No. 5	Cornell	W 98–60	10–1	–	–	–	Dean Smith Center; Chapel Hill, NC
January 7, 1993	No. 6	at NC State; Rivalry	W 100–67	11–1 (1–0)	–	–	–	Reynolds Coliseum; Raleigh, NC
January 9, 1993	No. 6	Maryland	W 101–73	12–1 (2–0)	–	–	–	Dean Smith Center; Chapel Hill, NC
January 13, 1993	No. 5	No. 8 Georgia Tech	W 80–67	13–1 (3–0)	–	–	–	Dean Smith Center; Chapel Hill, NC
January 16, 1993	No. 5	at Clemson	W 82–72	14–1 (4–0)	–	–	–	Littlejohn Coliseum; Clemson, SC
January 20, 1993	No. 3	No. 17 Virginia	W 80–58	15–1 (5–0)	–	–	–	Dean Smith Center; Chapel Hill, NC
January 24, 1993*	No. 3	at No. 10 Seton Hall	W 70–66	16–1	–	–	–	Brendan Byrne Arena; East Rutherford, New Jersey
January 27, 1993	No. 3	No. 19 Florida State	W 82–77	17–1 (6–0)	–	–	–	Dean Smith Center; Chapel Hill, NC
January 30, 1993	No. 3	at Wake Forest	L 62–88	17–2 (6–1)	–	–	–	Lawrence Joel Veterans Memorial Coliseum; Winston-Salem, NC
February 3, 1993	No. 6	at No. 5 Duke; Rivalry	L 67–81	17–3 (6–2)	–	–	–	Cameron Indoor Stadium; Durham, NC
February 6, 1993	No. 6	NC State	W 104–58	18–3 (7–2)	–	–	–	Dean Smith Center; Chapel Hill, NC
February 9, 1993	No. 6	at Maryland	W 77–63	19–3 (8–2)	–	–	–	Cole Field House; College Park, MD
February 14, 1993	No. 6	at Georgia Tech	W 77–66	20–3 (9–2)	–	–	–	Alexander Memorial Coliseum; Atlanta, GA
February 17, 1993	No. 3	Clemson	W 80–67	21–3 (10–2)	–	–	–	Dean Smith Center; Chapel Hill, NC
February 21, 1993	No. 3	at Virginia	W 78–58	22–3 (11–2)	–	–	–	University Hall; Charlottesville, VA
February 23, 1993*	No. 3	Notre Dame	W 85–56	23–3	–	–	–	Dean Smith Center; Chapel Hill, NC
February 27, 1993	No. 3	at No. 6 Florida State	W 86–76	24–3 (12–2)	–	–	–	Tallahassee-Leon County Civic Center; Tallahassee, FL
March 3, 1993	No. 1	No. 14 Wake Forest	W 83–65	25–3 (13–2)	–	–	–	Dean Smith Center; Chapel Hill, NC
March 7, 1993	No. 1	No. 6 Duke	W 83–69	26–3 (14–2)	–	–	–	Dean Smith Center; Chapel Hill, NC
ACC tournament
March 12, 1993*	No. 1	vs. Maryland; ACC Tournament • Quarterfinals	W 102–66	27–3	–	–	–	Charlotte Coliseum; Charlotte, NC
March 13, 1993*	No. 1	vs. Virginia; ACC Tournament • Semifinals	W 74–56	28–3	–	–	–	Charlotte Coliseum; Charlotte, NC
March 14, 1993*	No. 1	vs. Georgia Tech; ACC Tournament • Final	L 75–77	28–4	–	–	–	Charlotte Coliseum; Charlotte, NC
NCAA tournament
March 18, 1993*	(E1) No. 4	vs. (E16) East Carolina; NCAA Tournament • First round	W 85–65	29–4	–	–	–	Lawrence Joel Veterans Memorial Coliseum; Winston-Salem, NC
March 20, 1993*	(E1) No. 4	vs. (E8) Rhode Island; NCAA Tournament • Second Round	W 112–67	30–4	–	–	–	Lawrence Joel Veterans Memorial Coliseum; Winston-Salem, NC
March 26, 1993*	(E1) No. 4	vs. (E4) No. 12 Arkansas; NCAA Tournament • Regional semifinals	W 80–74	31–4	–	–	–	Brendan Byrne Arena; East Rutherford, NJ
March 28, 1993*	(E1) No. 4	vs. (E2) No. 7 Cincinnati; NCAA Tournament • Regional Final	W 75–68 ^{OT}	32–4	–	–	–	Brendan Byrne Arena; East Rutherford, NJ
April 3, 1993*; CBS	(E1) No. 4	vs. (MW2) No. 9 Kansas; NCAA Tournament • National semifinals	W 78–68	33–4	–	–	–	Louisiana Superdome; New Orleans, LA
April 5, 1993*; CBS	(E1) No. 4	vs. (W1) No. 3 Michigan; NCAA Tournament • National Final	W 77–71	34–4	25 – Williams	10 – Lynch	6 – Phelps	Louisiana Superdome; New Orleans, LA
*Non-conference game. ^{#}Rankings from AP Poll. (#) Tournament seedings in parentheses. E=East.

== Awards and honors ==
- Dean Smith, Naismith College Coach of the Year
- Donald Williams, NCAA Men's MOP Award

== Team players drafted into the NBA ==
Year	Round	Pick	Player	NBA club
1993	1	12	George Lynch	Los Angeles Lakers
1994	1	9	Eric Montross	Boston Celtics

Kevin Salvadori, Matt Wenstrom and Derrick Phelps also went on to play in the NBA, but were undrafted.
