= 1992–93 Duke Blue Devils men's basketball team =

American college basketball season

1992–93 Duke Blue Devils men's basketball

Maui Invitational champions

NCAA tournament, round of 32
- Conference: Atlantic Coast Conference

Ranking
- Coaches: No. 9
- AP: No. 10
- Record: 24–8 (10–6 ACC)
- Head coach: Mike Krzyzewski (13th season)

1992–93 ACC men's basketball standings
	Conf.				Overall
Team	W		L	PCT	W		L	PCT
No. 4 North Carolina	14	–	2	.875	34	–	4	.895
No. 11 Florida State	12	–	4	.750	25	–	10	.714
No. 10 Duke	10	–	6	.625	24	–	8	.750
No. 16 Wake Forest	10	–	6	.625	21	–	9	.700
Virginia	9	–	7	.563	21	–	10	.677
No. 18 Georgia Tech †	8	–	8	.500	19	–	11	.633
Clemson	5	–	11	.313	17	–	13	.567
Maryland	2	–	14	.125	12	–	16	.429
NC State	2	–	14	.125	8	–	19	.296
† 1993 ACC tournament winner Rankings from AP poll

The 1992–93 Duke Blue Devils men's basketball team represented Duke University in the 1992–93 NCAA Division I men's basketball season. Their head coach was Mike Krzyzewski in his 13th season with the Blue Devils. The team played their home games at Cameron Indoor Stadium as members of the Atlantic Coast Conference. The team finished the season 24–8, 10–6 in ACC play to finish a tie for third place. They lost to Georgia Tech in the quarterfinals of the ACC tournament. They received an at-large bid to the NCAA tournament as the No. 3 seed in the Midwest Region. There, they defeated Southern Illinois in the first round before being upset by California in the second round.

The Blue Devils entered the season looking to win their third consecutive national championship and entered the season as the No. 3 team in preseason polling. They reached No. 1 in the polls on December 7, 1992, and stayed there for five consecutive weeks as the Blue Devils won their first 10 games. A loss to Georgia Tech on January 10, 1993, ended their streak and knocked them from No. 1.

The season was the last season for the Duke legend Bobby Hurley.

== Schedule ==
Date time, TV	Rank^{#}	Opponent^{#}	Result	Record	Site (attendance) city, state
Regular season
December 1, 1992*; 7:30 pm	No. 4	Canisius	W 110–62	1–0	Cameron Indoor Stadium (9,314); Durham, North Carolina
December 5, 1992*; 9:00 pm	No. 4	No. 1 Michigan	W 79–68	2–0	Cameron Indoor Stadium (9,314); Durham, North Carolina
December 7, 1992*; 7:30 pm	No. 1	Northeastern	W 103–72	3–0	Cameron Indoor Stadium (9,314); Durham, North Carolina
December 12, 1992*; 7:30 pm	No. 1	vs. Rutgers	W 88–79	4–0	Izod Center (19,099); East Rutherford, New Jersey
December 21, 1992*; 9:30 pm	No. 1	vs. DePaul; Maui Invitational Tournament	W 89–73	5–0	Lahaina Civic Center (2,400); Lahaina, Hawaii
December 22, 1992*; 9:30 pm	No. 1	vs. LSU; Maui Invitational Tournament	W 96–67	6–0	Lahaina Civic Center (2,400); Lahaina, Hawaii
December 23, 1992*; 9:30 pm	No. 1	vs. BYU; Maui Invitational Tournament	W 89–66	7–0	Lahaina Civic Center (2,400); Lahaina, Hawaii
December 30, 1992*; 7:30 pm	No. 1	Boston University	W 106–62	8–0	Cameron Indoor Stadium (9,314); Durham, North Carolina
January 4, 1993*; 9:00 pm	No. 1	No. 11 Oklahoma	W 88–84 ^{OT}	9–0	Cameron Indoor Stadium (9,314); Durham, North Carolina
January 6, 1993; 7:30 pm	No. 1	Clemson	W 110–67	10–0	Cameron Indoor Stadium (9,314); Durham, North Carolina
January 10, 1993; 3:45 pm	No. 1	at No. 10 Georgia Tech	L 79–80	10–1	Alexander Memorial Coliseum (10,125); Atlanta
January 13, 1993; 7:00 pm	No. 3	at Wake Forest	W 86–59	11–1	Lawrence Joel Veterans Memorial Coliseum (14,526); Winston-Salem, North Carolina
January 16, 1993*; 4:00 pm	No. 3	No. 13 Iowa	W 65–56	12–1	Cameron Indoor Stadium (9,314); Durham, North Carolina
January 17, 1993; 5:00 pm	No. 3	No. 14 Virginia	L 69–77	12–2	Cameron Indoor Stadium (9,314); Durham, North Carolina
January 21, 1993; 7:30 pm	No. 6	NC State	W 92–56	13–2	Cameron Indoor Stadium (9,314); Durham, North Carolina
January 24, 1993; 3:45 pm	No. 6	at Florida State	L 88–89 ^{OT}	13–3	Tallahassee–Leon County Civic Center (13,333); Tallahassee, Florida
January 26, 1993*; 7:30 pm	No. 7	San Francisco	W 117–73	14–3	Cameron Indoor Stadium (9,314); Durham, North Carolina
January 30, 1993; 1:30 pm	No. 7	at Maryland; Rivalry	W 78–62	15–3	Cole Field House (14,500); College Park, Maryland
February 3, 1993; 9:00 pm	No. 5	No. 6 North Carolina; Rivalry	W 81–67	16–3	Cameron Indoor Stadium (9,314); Durham, North Carolina
February 6, 1993*; 1:00 pm	No. 5	at Notre Dame	W 67–50	17–3	Edmund P. Joyce Center (11,418); South Bend, Indiana
February 8, 1993; 7:30 pm	No. 3	at Clemson	W 93–84	18–3	Littlejohn Coliseum (11,000); Clemson, South Carolina
February 10, 1993; 8:00 pm	No. 3	Georgia Tech	W 73–63	19–3	Cameron Indoor Stadium (9,314); Durham, North Carolina
February 13, 1993; 4:00 pm	No. 3	No. 9 Wake Forest	L 86–98	19–4	Cameron Indoor Stadium (9,314); Durham, North Carolina
February 18, 1993; 9:00 pm	No. 7	at No. 23 Virginia	L 55–58	19–5	University Hall (8,864); Charlottesville, Virginia
February 21, 1993; 3:45 pm	No. 7	at NC State	W 91–82	20–5	Reynolds Coliseum (12,400); Raleigh, North Carolina
February 24, 1993; 9:00 pm	No. 9	No. 6 Florida State	W 98–75	21–5	Cameron Indoor Stadium (9,314); Durham, North Carolina
February 28, 1993*; 4:00 pm	No. 9	UCLA	W 78–67	22–5	Cameron Indoor Stadium (9,314); Durham, North Carolina
March 3, 1993; 9:00 pm	No. 6	Maryland; Homecoming/Rivalry	W 95–79	23–5	Cameron Indoor Stadium (9,314); Durham, North Carolina
March 7, 1993; 1:30 pm	No. 6	No. 1 North Carolina	L 69–83	23–6	Dean Smith Center (21,572); Chapel Hill, North Carolina
NCAA tournament
March 12, 1993	No. 8	vs. Georgia Tech; ACC tournament Quarterfinals	L 66–69	23–7	Charlotte Coliseum (23,532); Charlotte, North Carolina
NCAA tournament
March 18, 1993*; CBS	No. 10	vs. Southern Illinois; NCAA Midwest First Round	W 105–70	24–7	Rosemont Horizon (17,463); Rosemont, Illinois
March 20, 1993*; 6:00 pm, CBS	No. 10	vs. California; NCAA Midwest Second Round	L 77–82	24–8	Rosemont Horizon (17,463); Rosemont, Illinois
*Non-conference game. ^{#}Rankings from Coaches' Poll. (#) Tournament seedings in parentheses.
