= 1992–93 George Washington Colonials men's basketball team =

American college basketball season

1992–93 George Washington Colonials men's basketball

NCAA tournament, Sweet Sixteen
- Conference: Atlantic 10 Conference

Ranking
- Coaches: No. 21
- Record: 21–9 (8–6 A-10)
- Head coach: Mike Jarvis (3rd season)
- Home arena: Charles E. Smith Athletic Center

1992–93 Atlantic 10 men's basketball standings
	Conf.				Overall
Team	W		L	PCT	W		L	PCT
No. 14 UMass †	11	–	3	.786	24	–	7	.774
George Washington	8	–	6	.571	21	–	9	.700
Rhode Island	8	–	6	.571	19	–	11	.633
Saint Joseph's	8	–	6	.571	18	–	11	.621
Temple	8	–	6	.571	20	–	13	.606
West Virginia	7	–	7	.500	17	–	12	.586
Rutgers	6	–	8	.429	13	–	15	.464
St. Bonaventure	0	–	14	.000	10	–	17	.370
† 1993 Atlantic 10 Tournament winner Rankings from AP Poll

The 1992–93 George Washington Colonials men's basketball team represent George Washington University as a member of the Atlantic 10 Conference during the 1992–93 NCAA Division I men's basketball season. The team was coached by Mike Jarvis and played their home games at the Charles E. Smith Athletic Center. The Colonials finished in a four-way tie for second place in the regular season conference standings. After being knocked out in the opening round of the A-10 tournament, GW received an at-large bid to the 1993 NCAA tournament as No. 12 seed in the West region. The Colonials made a run to the Sweet Sixteen by defeating No. 5 seed New Mexico and No. 13 seed Southern. The team was eliminated from the tournament by the famed Fab Five from Michigan, 72–64, to finish with a record of 21–9 (8–6 A-10).

== Roster ==
1992–93 George Washington Colonials men's basketball team
Players
Coaches

Pos.	#	Name	Height	Weight	Year	Hometown
G	4	Dirkk Surles	6 ft 3 in (1.91 m)	195 lb (88 kg)	Sr	Evansville, Indiana
C	33	Yinka Dare	7 ft 1.5 in (2.17 m)	260 lb (118 kg)	Fr	Kano, Nigeria

Head coach

- Mike Jarvis (Northeastern)

Assistant coach(es)

Legend

- (C) Team captain
- (S) Suspended
- (I) Ineligible
- (W) Walk-on
- Injured
- Current redshirt

Roster

== Schedule and results ==
Date time, TV	Rank^{#}	Opponent^{#}	Result	Record	Site city, state
Regular season
Dec 1, 1992*		at Monmouth	W 76–54	1–0	Boylan Gymnasium; West Long Branch, New Jersey
Dec 4, 1992*		vs. Central Michigan; Hatter Classic	W 87–66	2–0	Edmunds Center; DeLand, Florida
Dec 5, 1992*		vs. Bethune-Cookman; Hatter Classic	W 65–45	3–0	Edmunds Center; DeLand, Florida
Dec 8, 1992*		Hartford	W 75–55	4–0	Charles E. Smith Center; Washington, D.C.
Dec 11, 1992*		Columbia; Red Auerbach Colonial Classic	W 80–70	5–0	Charles E. Smith Center; Washington, D.C.
Dec 12, 1992*		Tennessee State; Red Auerbach Colonial Classic	W 83–63	6–0	Charles E. Smith Center; Washington, D.C.
Dec 21, 1992*		at San Diego	W 74–60	7–0	USD Sports Center; San Diego, California
Dec 23, 1992*		at Pepperdine	L 79–81	7–1	Firestone Fieldhouse; Malibu, California
Dec 30, 1992*		at UNC Charlotte	W 90–63	8–1	Charlotte Coliseum; Charlotte, North Carolina
Jan 2, 1993*		American	W 82–71	9–1	Charles E. Smith Center; Washington, D.C.
Jan 6, 1993*		at James Madison	W 71–56	10–1	JMU Convocation Center; Harrisonburg, Virginia
Jan 8, 1993		at West Virginia	L 56–72	10–2 (0–1)	WVU Coliseum; Morgantown, West Virginia
Jan 12, 1993		Temple	L 62–64	10–3 (0–2)	Charles E. Smith Center; Washington, D.C.
Jan 16, 1993		at UMass	L 68–76	10–4 (0–3)	Curry Hicks Cage; Amherst, Massachusetts
Jan 23, 1993		Rhode Island	W 88–75	11–4 (1–3)	Charles E. Smith Center; Washington, D.C.
Jan 30, 1993		Saint Joseph's	W 78–59	12–4 (2–3)	Charles E. Smith Center; Washington, D.C.
Feb 2, 1993		at Rutgers	W 105–100	13–4 (3–3)	Louis Brown Athletic Center; Piscataway, New Jersey
Feb 6, 1993		St. Bonaventure	W 64–59	14–4 (4–3)	Charles E. Smith Center; Washington, D.C.
Feb 10, 1993		at Temple	W 75–72	15–4 (5–3)	McGonigle Hall; Philadelphia, Pennsylvania
Feb 13, 1993		No. 22 UMass	L 65–68	15–5 (5–4)	Charles E. Smith Center; Washington, D.C.
Feb 15, 1993*		Richmond; 2nd Annual Presidents' Day Game	W 79–77 ^{OT}	16–5	Charles E. Smith Center; Washington, D.C.
Feb 18, 1993		at St. Bonaventure	W 89–72	17–5 (6–4)	Reilly Center; St. Bonaventure, New York
Feb 21, 1993		West Virginia	W 71–68	18–5 (7–4)	Charles E. Smith Center; Washington, D.C.
Feb 25, 1993		at Saint Joseph's	L 73–74	18–6 (7–5)	Hagan Arena; Philadelphia, Pennsylvania
Feb 28, 1993		Rutgers	W 74–72	19–6 (8–5)	Charles E. Smith Center; Washington, D.C.
Mar 4, 1993		at Rhode Island	L 72–75	19–7 (8–6)	Keaney Gymnasium; Kingston, Rhode Island
Atlantic 10 Tournament
Mar 7, 1993*	(4)	vs. (5) Rhode Island; Quarterfinals	L 75–86	19–8	Palestra; Philadelphia, Pennsylvania
NCAA Tournament
Mar 19, 1993*	(12 W)	vs. (5 W) No. 21 New Mexico; First round	W 82–68	20–8	McKale Center; Tucson, Arizona
Mar 21, 1993*	(12 W)	vs. (13 W) Southern; Second Round	W 90–80	21–8	McKale Center; Tucson, Arizona
Mar 26, 1993*	(12 W)	vs. (1 W) No. 3 Michigan; West Regional semifinals – Sweet Sixteen	L 64–72	21–9	Kingdome; Seattle, Washington
*Non-conference game. ^{#}Rankings from AP poll. (#) Tournament seedings in parentheses. W=West.
