= Rose Hill Gymnasium =

Arena

- "The Prairie"
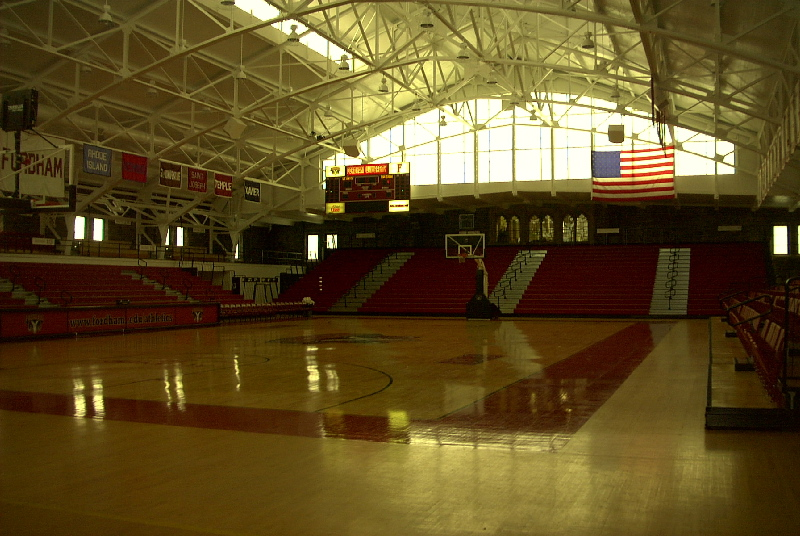
- Interactive map of Rose Hill Gymnasium
- Location: Fordham University; Bronx, NY 10458
- Coordinates: 40.862148°N 73.883824°W
- Owner: Fordham University
- Operator: Fordham University
- Capacity: 3,200 (basketball and volleyball)
- Surface: Hardwood
- Public transit: Harlem/New Haven lines at Fordham

Construction
- Opened: January 16, 1925

Tenants
- Fordham Rams (basketball and volleyball)

Rose Hill Gymnasium is a 3,200-seat multi-purpose arena on the Rose Hill campus of Fordham University in The Bronx, New York City, New York. The arena, which opened in 1925, is the oldest on-campus venue currently used primarily for an NCAA Division I basketball team. After the closure of Northeastern University's Matthews Arena in December 2025, it became the oldest overall college basketball venue in use. The volleyball team of Fordham University also uses the gym. The Rose Hill Gymnasium has a gothic facade in keeping with the rest of Fordham University's buildings. The interior design features two high-tech video boards, bleachers that surround all four sides of the court, and additional elevated seating along the court. ESPN named this gym one of the four “cathedrals” of college basketball. At the time it was built, it was one of the largest on-campus facilities in the country, earning it the nickname "The Prairie." The Rose Hill Gymnasium has been the site of many legendary college and high school basketball games, including the final high school game of Lew Alcindor, later known as Kareem Abdul-Jabbar. During World War II, it was also used as a barracks. New York City Mayor Ed Koch lived in these barracks for a time. As early as 1970, an effort headed by famed Fordham alumnus Vince Lombardi was made to build a new arena. This effort ended with Lombardi's death and the move of head basketball coach "Digger" Phelps to the University of Notre Dame.

== Architectural style ==
Some of the features of the building that display a Gothic Revival architectural style include arches and arch-like shapes, buttresses around the windows for exterior support, stone carvings, a parapet with crenellations commonly used in medieval castles, a stone sculpture of a cross and Fordham's emblem above the main arch to the entrance, and walls made of rough light field stones.

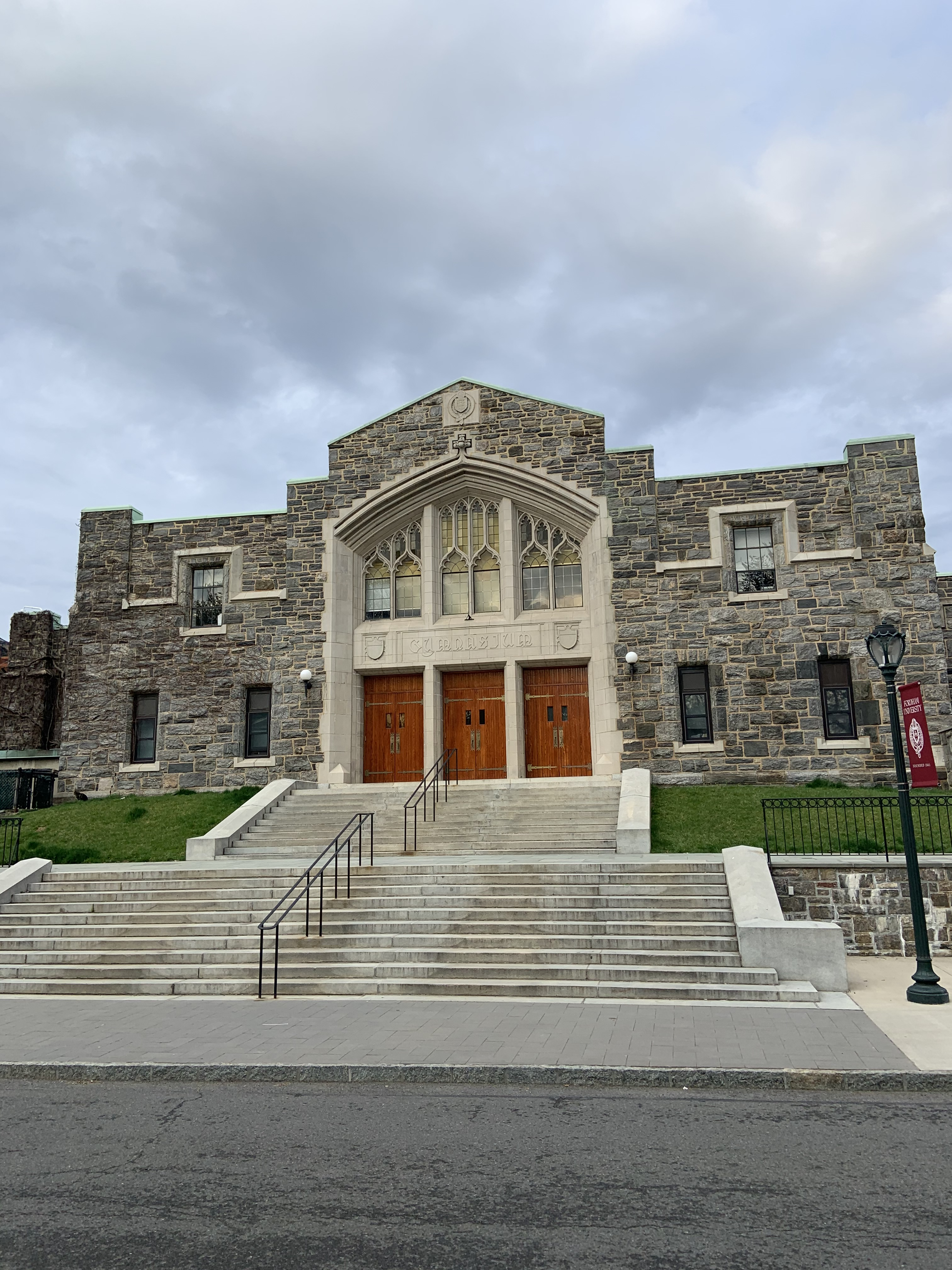

== History ==
The Gymnasium hosted its first basketball game on January 16, 1925. The game was refereed by Frankie Frisch, a Fordham alumni, and New York Giants' second baseman.

During World War 2, this gym was used as a U.S. Army barracks to shelter the soldiers and separate them from the general public. On May 11, 1946, President Harry Truman visited this barrack and rang a ship bell that remains there today. Fordham athletic teams continue to ring this bell after conference championship wins.

== Renovations ==
The Rose Hill Gymnasium was almost renovated in the early 1970s. Vince Lombardi, a Fordham football alumni, wanted to transform the small gym into a 10,500-seat gym. This plan fell through when Lombardi died in 1970, and the head basketball coach Digger Phelps left Fordham for Notre Dame in 1971. Instead, Fordham University built a separate athletic facility attached to the gym.

In 2018, the Rose Hill Gymnasium basketball court was renamed the Frank McLaughlin Family Basketball Court after alumnus Frank McLaughlin, who was a basketball player (1965–1969), assistant coach (1970–1971), and athletic director (1985–2012) for Fordham University.

In 2019, Caldwell & Walsh Building Construction Inc. renovated the gym floors from old wood to a modern shock-absorbing material. The renovation was completed in a four-and-a-half-month period.

== See also ==
- List of NCAA Division I basketball arenas
