= Tom McLaughlin (basketball) =

American sports agent and basketball coach

Playing career
- 1970–1973: UMass
- 1973–1975: Neuchantel Sports

Coaching career (HC unless noted)
- 1975–1978: Stanford (assistant)
- 1978–1981: Notre Dame (assistant)
- 1981–1983: UMass

Head coaching record
- Overall: 16–40 (.286)

Thomas McLaughlin is an American sports agent and basketball coach who was the head coach of the UMass Minutemen basketball team from 1981 to 1983. He previously played for the Minutemen from 1970 to 1973.

== Playing ==
A native of The Bronx, McLaughlin was a second-team all-city basketball player at Fordham Preparatory School. He played his freshman year at Tennessee, then transferred to UMass, where he played forward for the Minutemen from 1970 to 1973. He was teammates with Julius Erving, Al Skinner, and Rick Pitino and played in the 1971 and 1973 National Invitation Tournaments. He averaged 9.5 points per game, 4.7 rebounds per game, and 1.7 assists per game over 67 games at UMass. He played two seasons professionally in Switzerland.

== Coaching ==
McLaughlin began his coaching career in 1975 as an assistant to Dick DiBiaso at Stanford. In 1978, he became an assistant under Digger Phelps at Notre Dame.

In 1981, McLaughlin was named head coach at his alma mater – UMass. He inherited a program that had won only five games in the past two seasons, with four of those wins coming against Division II teams. On December 5, 1981, McLaughlin's Minutemen ended their 38-game Eastern Athletic Association losing streak by defeating Duquesne. Later that season, they beat Harvard, which was coached by McLaughlin's brother, Frank. UMass finished the season with a 7–20 record – their best in four seasons. The Minutemen did not improve the following season, going 9–20. McLaughlin resigned on March 14, 1983, stating that it was time for him "to step back from basketball" and spent more time with his sons.

== Sports agent ==
McLaughlin chose to leave coaching entirely, instead working as a representative for Converse. He later became a sports agent. He worked for Woolf Associates until 1995, when he left to start his own agency. With Dwight Robinson, he operated Best In Sports, Inc. Their clients included Scott Burrell, Chris Smith, Donny Marshall, and LaPhonso Ellis.
