= 1992–93 Temple Owls men's basketball team =

American college basketball season

1992–93 Temple Owls men's basketball

NCAA tournament, Elite Eight
- Conference: Atlantic 10 Conference

Ranking
- Coaches: No. 13
- Record: 20–13 (8–6 A–10)
- Head coach: John Chaney (11th season)
- Home arena: McGonigle Hall (Capacity: 4,500)

1992–93 Atlantic 10 men's basketball standings
| | Conf. | | | | Overall |
| Team | W | | L | PCT | W | | L | PCT |
|---|---|---|---|---|---|---|---|---|
| No. 14 UMass † | 11 | – | 3 | .786 | 24 | – | 7 | .774 |
| George Washington | 8 | – | 6 | .571 | 21 | – | 9 | .700 |
| Rhode Island | 8 | – | 6 | .571 | 19 | – | 11 | .633 |
| Saint Joseph's | 8 | – | 6 | .571 | 18 | – | 11 | .621 |
| Temple | 8 | – | 6 | .571 | 20 | – | 13 | .606 |
| West Virginia | 7 | – | 7 | .500 | 17 | – | 12 | .586 |
| Rutgers | 6 | – | 8 | .429 | 13 | – | 15 | .464 |
| St. Bonaventure | 0 | – | 14 | .000 | 10 | – | 17 | .370 |
† 1993 Atlantic 10 Tournament winner Rankings from AP Poll

The 1992–93 Temple Owls men's basketball team represented Temple University as a member of the Atlantic 10 Conference during the 1992–93 NCAA Division I men's basketball season. The team was led by head coach John Chaney and played their home games at McGonigle Hall. The Owls received an at-large bid to the NCAA tournament as No. 7 seed in the West region. Temple made a run to the Elite Eight but, for the second consecutive season, fell in the tournament to the famed Fab Five of Michigan, 77–72. The team finished with a record of 20–13 (8–6 A-10).

== Roster ==
1992–93 Temple Owls men's basketball team
Players
Coaches

| Pos. | # | Name | Height | Weight | Year | Previous school | Hometown |
|---|---|---|---|---|---|---|---|
| PG | 4 | Rick Brunson | 6 ft 4 in (1.93 m) | 180 lb (82 kg) | So | Salem HS | Salem, MA |
| G/F | 21 | Eddie Jones | 6 ft 6 in (1.98 m) | 190 lb (86 kg) | So | Blanche Ely HS | Pompano Beach, FL |
| G/F | 23 | Aaron McKie | 6 ft 5 in (1.96 m) | 200 lb (91 kg) | Jr | Glenn Hills HS | Philadelphia, PA |
| C | 33 | William Cunningham | 6 ft 11 in (2.11 m) | 240 lb (109 kg) | Fr | McNair HS | Augusta, GA |

Head coach

- John Chaney

Assistant coach(es)

Legend

- (C) Team captain
- (S) Suspended
- (I) Ineligible
- (W) Walk-on
- Injured
- Current redshirt

Roster

== Schedule ==
| Date time, TV | Rank^{#} | Opponent^{#} | Result | Record | Site city, state |
Regular season
| Dec 8, 1992* | | at Boston College | W 79–72 | 1–0 | Silvio O. Conte Forum; Boston, Massachusetts |
| Dec 15, 1992* | | vs. La Salle | W 87–60 | 2–0 | The Spectrum; Philadelphia, Pennsylvania |
| Dec 19, 1992* | | vs. Florida; Milk Classic | W 67–62 | 3–0 | Orlando, Florida |
| Dec 20, 1992* | | vs. No. 10 Florida State; Milk Classic | L 80–91 ^{OT} | 3–1 | Orlando, Florida |
| Dec 23, 1992* | | vs. Penn State | W 70–61 | 4–1 | |
| Dec 26, 1992* | | at No. 23 Cincinnati | L 45–68 | 4–2 | Myrl Shoemaker Center; Cincinnati, Ohio |
| Jan 3, 1993 | | Saint Joseph's | L 66–71 | 4–3 | McGonigle Hall; Philadelphia, Pennsylvania |
| Jan 9, 1993 | | No. 22 UMass | W 52–44 | 5–3 | McGonigle Hall; Philadelphia, Pennsylvania |
| Jan 12, 1993 | | at George Washington | W 64–62 | 6–3 | Charles E. Smith Center; Washington, D.C. |
| Jan 17, 1993 | | at St. Bonaventure | W 74–58 | 7–3 | Reilly Center; St. Bonaventure, New York |
| Jan 19, 1993* | | vs. Penn | W 72–58 | 8–3 | |
| Feb 22, 1993* | | No. 16 Tulane | W 79–57 | 12–10 | McGonigle Hall; Philadelphia, Pennsylvania |
| Feb 24, 1993* | | Memphis State | W 65–58 | 13–10 | McGonigle Hall; Philadelphia, Pennsylvania |
| Mar 3, 1993 | | Rutgers | W 89–75 | 15–11 (8–6) | McGonigle Hall; Philadelphia, Pennsylvania |
Atlantic 10 Tournament
| Mar 7, 1993* | (3) | (6) West Virginia; Quarterfinals | W 80–53 | 16–11 | Palestra; Philadelphia, Pennsylvania |
| Mar 8, 1993* | (3) | vs. (2) Saint Joseph's; Semifinals | W 71–60 | 17–11 | Palestra; Philadelphia, Pennsylvania |
| Mar 11, 1993* | (3) | at (1) No. 20 UMass; Championship Game | L 61–69 | 17–12 | Mullins Center; Amherst, Massachusetts |
NCAA Tournament
| Mar 18, 1993* | (7 W) | vs. (10 W) Missouri; First round | W 75–61 | 18–12 | Jon M. Huntsman Center; Salt Lake City, Utah |
| Mar 20, 1993* | (7 W) | vs. (15 W) Santa Clara; Second Round | W 68–57 | 19–12 | Jon M. Huntsman Center; Salt Lake City, Utah |
| Mar 26, 1993* | (7 W) | vs. (3 W) No. 8 Vanderbilt; West Regional semifinal – Sweet Sixteen | W 67–59 | 20–12 | Kingdome; Seattle, Washington |
| Mar 28, 1993* | (7 W) | vs. (1 W) No. 3 Michigan; West Regional Final – Elite Eight | L 72–77 | 20–13 | Kingdome; Seattle, Washington |
*Non-conference game. ^{#}Rankings from AP Poll. (#) Tournament seedings in parentheses. W=West. All times are in Eastern Standard Time.
