= 1992–93 Virginia Cavaliers men's basketball team =

American college basketball season

1992–93 Virginia Cavaliers men's basketball

NCAA tournament, Sweet Sixteen
- Conference: Atlantic Coast Conference

Ranking
- Coaches: No. 18
- Record: 21–10 (9–7 ACC)
- Head coach: Jeff Jones (3rd season)
- Assistant coaches: Brian Ellerbe (3rd season); Tom Perrin (6th season); Dennis Wolff (3rd season)
- Home arena: University Hall

1992–93 ACC men's basketball standings
| | Conf. | | | | Overall |
| Team | W | | L | PCT | W | | L | PCT |
|---|---|---|---|---|---|---|---|---|
| No. 4 North Carolina | 14 | – | 2 | .875 | 34 | – | 4 | .895 |
| No. 11 Florida State | 12 | – | 4 | .750 | 25 | – | 10 | .714 |
| No. 10 Duke | 10 | – | 6 | .625 | 24 | – | 8 | .750 |
| No. 16 Wake Forest | 10 | – | 6 | .625 | 21 | – | 9 | .700 |
| Virginia | 9 | – | 7 | .563 | 21 | – | 10 | .677 |
| No. 18 Georgia Tech † | 8 | – | 8 | .500 | 19 | – | 11 | .633 |
| Clemson | 5 | – | 11 | .313 | 17 | – | 13 | .567 |
| Maryland | 2 | – | 14 | .125 | 12 | – | 16 | .429 |
| NC State | 2 | – | 14 | .125 | 8 | – | 19 | .296 |
† 1993 ACC tournament winner Rankings from AP poll

The 1992–93 Virginia Cavaliers men's basketball team represented University of Virginia as a member of the Atlantic Coast Conference during the 1992–93 NCAA Division I men's basketball season. The team was led by third-year head coach Jeff Jones. The Cavaliers earned an at-large bid to the NCAA tournament as No. 6 seed in the East region. They defeated Manhattan in the opening round and No. 3 seed UMass to reach the Sweet Sixteen before falling to No. 2 seed Cincinnati. The Cavaliers finished with a record of 21–10 (9–7 ACC).

== Roster ==
1992–93 Virginia Cavaliers men's basketball team
Players
Coaches

| Pos. | # | Name | Height | Weight | Year | Hometown |
|---|---|---|---|---|---|---|
| PF | 4 | Junior Burrough | 6 ft 8 in (2.03 m) | 235 lb (107 kg) | So | Charlotte, North Carolina |
| G/F | 5 | Cornel Parker | 6 ft 7 in (2.01 m) | 185 lb (84 kg) | Jr | Norfolk, Virginia |
| G | 11 | Doug Smith | 6 ft 1 in (1.85 m) | 183 lb (83 kg) | Sr | Fayetteville, Tennessee |
| PG | 12 | Cory Alexander | 6 ft 1 in (1.85 m) | 176 lb (80 kg) | So | Waynesboro, Virginia |
| G | 15 | Chris Havlicek | 6 ft 5 in (1.96 m) | 204 lb (93 kg) | Jr | Weston, Massachusetts |
| F | 22 | Jason Williford | 6 ft 6 in (1.98 m) | 205 lb (93 kg) | So | Richmond, Virginia |
| G | 23 | Rock Mitchell | 5 ft 11 in (1.8 m) | 177 lb (80 kg) | Sr | Richmond, Virginia |
| F/C | 24 | Yuri Barnes | 6 ft 8 in (2.03 m) | 225 lb (102 kg) | So | Richmond, Virginia |
| F/C | 30 | Chris Alexander | 6 ft 9 in (2.06 m) | 214 lb (97 kg) | Fr | Long Branch, New Jersey |
| G | 31 | Bobby Graves | 6 ft 4 in (1.93 m) | 196 lb (89 kg) | So | Herndon, Virginia |
| F/C | 42 | Ted Jeffries | 6 ft 9 in (2.06 m) | 247 lb (112 kg) | Sr | Bowie, Maryland |
| G/F | 44 | Maurice Watkins | 6 ft 5 in (1.96 m) | 202 lb (92 kg) | Fr | Petersburg, Virginia |
| C | 53 | Shawn Wilson | 6 ft 11 in (2.11 m) | 241 lb (109 kg) | Jr | Franklin, Tennessee |

Head coach

- Jeff Jones

Assistant coach(es)

- Brian Ellerbe
- Tom Perrin
- Dennis Wolff

Legend

- (C) Team captain
- (S) Suspended
- (I) Ineligible
- (W) Walk-on
- Injured
- Current redshirt

Roster

== Schedule and results ==
| Date time, TV | Rank^{#} | Opponent^{#} | Result | Record | Site (attendance) city, state |
Regular season
| Dec 1, 1992* | | at Penn | W 74–68 | 1–0 | Palestra; Philadelphia, Pennsylvania |
| Dec 5, 1992* | | Stanford | W 72–48 | 2–0 | University Hall; Charlottesville, Virginia |
| Dec 9, 1992* | | Old Dominion | W 90–68 | 3–0 | University Hall; Charlottesville, Virginia |
| Dec 12, 1992* | | Howard | W 100–64 | 4–0 | University Hall; Charlottesville, Virginia |
| Dec 22, 1992* | | Alabama | W 86–83 | 5–0 | University Hall; Charlottesville, Virginia |
| Dec 29, 1992* | | Radford | W 82–63 | 6–0 | University Hall; Charlottesville, Virginia |
| Jan 2, 1993* | | Winthrop | W 92–68 | 7–0 | University Hall; Charlottesville, Virginia |
| Jan 6, 1993 | No. 25 | No. 23 Florida State | W 80–76 | 8–0 (1–0) | University Hall; Charlottesville, Virginia |
| Jan 9, 1993 | No. 25 | at NC State | W 73–56 | 9–0 (2–0) | Reynolds Coliseum; Raleigh, North Carolina |
| Jan 13, 1993 | No. 14 | Clemson | W 100–82 | 10–0 (3–0) | University Hall; Charlottesville, Virginia |
| Jan 17, 1993 | No. 14 | at No. 3 Duke | W 77–69 | 11–0 (4–0) | Cameron Indoor Stadium; Durham, North Carolina |
| Jan 20, 1993 | No. 7 | at No. 3 North Carolina | L 58–80 | 11–1 (4–1) | Dean Smith Center; Chapel Hill, North Carolina |
| Jan 23, 1993 | No. 7 | No. 16 Georgia Tech | L 71–75 | 11–2 (4–2) | University Hall; Charlottesville, Virginia |
| Jan 25, 1993* | No. 15 | at William & Mary | W 93–84 | 12–2 | Kaplan Arena; Williamsburg, Pennsylvania |
| Jan 27, 1993 | No. 15 | Wake Forest | L 73–75 | 12–3 (4–3) | University Hall; Charlottesville, Virginia |
| Jan 30, 1993* | No. 15 | vs. Virginia Tech | L 53–59 | 12–4 | |
| Feb 4, 1993 | No. 24 | at Maryland | W 70–68 | 13–4 (5–3) | Cole Fieldhouse; College Park, Maryland |
| Feb 8, 1993 | No. 24 | at No. 10 Florida State | L 84–99 | 13–5 (5–4) | Tallahassee-Leon County Civic Center; Tallahassee, Florida |
| Feb 11, 1993 | No. 24 | NC State | W 75–66 | 14–5 (6–4) | University Hall; Charlottesville, Virginia |
| Feb 13, 1993 | No. 24 | at Clemson | W 83–78 | 15–5 (7–4) | Littlejohn Coliseum; Clemson, South Carolina |
| Feb 18, 1993* | No. 23 | No. 7 Duke | W 58–55 | 16–5 (8–4) | University Hall; Charlottesville, Virginia |
| Feb 21, 1993 | No. 23 | No. 3 North Carolina | L 58–78 | 16–6 (8–5) | University Hall; Charlottesville, Virginia |
| Feb 23, 1993 | No. 22 | at Georgia Tech | L 61–73 | 16–7 (8–6) | Alexander Memorial Coliseum; Atlanta, Georgia |
| Feb 27, 1993 | No. 22 | at No. 12 Wake Forest | L 56–58 | 16–8 (8–7) | Lawrence Joel Coliseum; Winston-Salem, North Carolina |
| Mar 3, 1993* | | College of Charleston | W 72–58 | 17–8 | University Hall; Charlottesville, Virginia |
| Mar 6, 1993 | | Maryland | W 88–74 | 18–8 (9–7) | University Hall; Charlottesville, Virginia |
ACC Tournament
| Mar 12, 1993* | | vs. No. 12 Wake Forest; ACC Tournament quarterfinals | W 61–57 | 19–8 | Charlotte Coliseum; Charlotte, North Carolina |
| Mar 13, 1993* | | vs. No. 1 North Carolina; ACC Tournament semifinals | L 56–74 | 19–9 | Charlotte Coliseum; Charlotte, North Carolina |
NCAA tournament
| Mar 19, 1993* | (6 E) | vs. (11 E) Manhattan; First round | W 78–66 | 20–9 | Carrier Dome; Syracuse, New York |
| Mar 21, 1993* | (6 E) | vs. (3 E) No. 14 UMass; Second Round | W 71–56 | 21–9 | Carrier Dome; Syracuse, New York |
| Mar 26, 1993* | (6 E) | vs. (2 E) No. 7 Cincinnati; East Regional semifinals – Sweet Sixteen | L 54–71 | 21–10 | Brendan Byrne Arena; East Rutherford, New Jersey |
*Non-conference game. ^{#}Rankings from AP poll. (#) Tournament seedings in parentheses. E=East. All times are in Eastern time.
