= Jack Leaman =

American college basketball coach

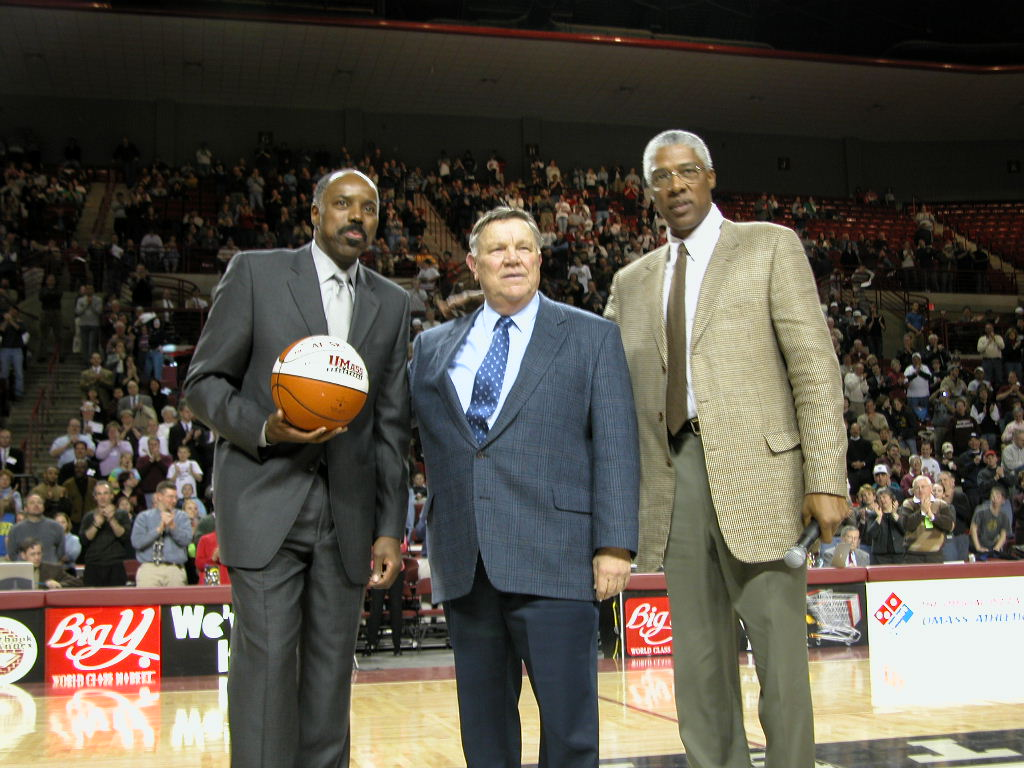
- Jack Leaman (center) with Al Skinner (left) and Julius Erving (right) at the retirement ceremony for Skinner's UMass jersey number 30 on Feb 18, 2004.

Biographical details
- Born: December 22, 1932; Boston, Massachusetts, U.S.
- Died: March 6, 2004 (aged 71); Washington, D. C., U.S.

Playing career
- 1957–1959: Boston University
- Position: Guard

Coaching career (HC unless noted)
- 1961–1966: UMass (assistant)
- 1966–1979: UMass
- 1986–1987: UMass (women's)

Head coaching record
- Overall: 217–126 (men's); 14–12 (women's)

Accomplishments and honors

Championships
- 8x Yankee Conference (1968–1971, 1973–1976)

Awards
- 2× New England Coach of the Year

Jack Leaman (December 22, 1932 – March 6, 2004) was an American college basketball coach, best known as the head coach of the UMass Minutemen basketball team from 1966 to 1979.

== Career ==
He would become the school's all-time winningest coach, compiling an overall record of 217–126. His teams won 8 Yankee Conference titles and earned 6 trips to the National Invitational Tournament. A 2-time New England Coach of the Year, he was inducted into the Boston University Athletic Hall of Fame in 1977, the UMass Athletic Hall of Fame in 1988, and the New England Basketball Hall of Fame in 2003. Some of the players he coached during his tenure include Julius Erving, Rick Pitino, and Al Skinner. In all, he coached 22 All-Yankee Conference selections during his coaching career. Leaman also served as a radio color commentator for UMass men's basketball for 10 seasons beginning in 1994, and served as head coach for the UMass Minutewomen basketball team for the 1986–87 season. The basketball court at the Mullins Center is named in his honor.

Born in Boston in 1932, Leaman graduated from Cambridge Rindge and Latin School in 1951. After 2 years in the United States Army, and after receiving an honorable discharge, Leaman earned both a bachelor's and master's degree from Boston University. He led the BU basketball team in both scoring and assists during his 3-year playing career. As senior captain in 1959, he led the Terriers to an overall record of 20–7, culminating with a trip to the NCAA East Regional Final. His number 10 was retired by Boston University in 2008.

Leaman was appointed UMass assistant basketball coach in 1961 under head coach Matthew Zunic, who had coached him as a player at BU. Leaman continued as an assistant under Johnny Orr until he was promoted to head coach for the 1966–67 season.

== Head coaching record ==
=== Men's basketball ===
Record table
Season	Team	Overall	Conference	Standing	Postseason
UMass Minutemen (Yankee Conference) (1966–1976)
1966–67	UMass	11–14	7–3	3rd	
1967–68	UMass	14–11	8–2	T–1st	
1968–69	UMass	17–7	9–1	1st	
1969–70	UMass	18–7	8–2	T–1st	NIT 1st Round
1970–71	UMass	23–4	10–0	1st	NIT 1st Round
1971–72	UMass	14–12	6–4	T–2nd	
1972–73	UMass	20–7	10–2	1st	NIT 2nd Round
1973–74	UMass	21–5	11–1	1st	NIT 1st Round
1974–75	UMass	18–8	10–2	1st	NIT 1st Round
1975–76	UMass	21–6	11–1	1st	
UMass Minutemen (Eastern Collegiate Basketball League / Eastern Athletic Association) (1976–1979)
1976–77	UMass	20–11	3–4	4th (East)	NIT 2nd Round
1977–78	UMass	15–12	5–5	T–3rd (East)	
1978–79	UMass	5–22	0–10	8th	
UMass:		217–126	98–37		
Total:		217–126			
National champion Postseason invitational champion Conference regular season champion Conference regular season and conference tournament champion Division regular season champion Division regular season and conference tournament champion Conference tournament champion

=== Women's basketball ===
Record table
Season	Team	Overall	Conference	Standing	Postseason
UMass Minutewomen (Atlantic 10 Conference) (1986–1987)
1986–87	UMass	14–12	9–9	5th	
UMass:		14–12	9–9		
Total:		14–12			
