= 1993 NCAA Men's Basketball All-Americans =

- Awarded for: 1992–93 NCAA Division I men's basketball season

The Consensus 1993 College Basketball All-American team, as determined by aggregating the results of four major All-American teams. To earn "consensus" status, a player must win honors from a majority of the following teams: the Associated Press, the USBWA, The United Press International and the National Association of Basketball Coaches.

== 1993 Consensus All-America team ==
Consensus First Team
Player	Position	Class	Team
Calbert Cheaney	F	Senior	Indiana
Penny Hardaway	G	Junior	Memphis State
Bobby Hurley	G	Senior	Duke
Jamal Mashburn	F	Junior	Kentucky
Chris Webber	F/C	Sophomore	Michigan

Consensus Second Team
Player	Position	Class	Team
Terry Dehere	G	Senior	Seton Hall
Grant Hill	F	Junior	Duke
Billy McCaffrey	G	Junior	Vanderbilt
Eric Montross	C	Junior	North Carolina
J. R. Rider	G	Senior	UNLV
Glenn Robinson	F	Sophomore	Purdue
Rodney Rogers	F	Junior	Wake Forest

== Individual All-America teams ==
All-America Team
All-America Team	First team		Second team		Third team	
All-America Team	Player	School	Player	School	Player	School
Associated Press	Calbert Cheaney	Indiana	Terry Dehere	Seton Hall	Grant Hill	Duke
Associated Press	Penny Hardaway	Memphis State	Eric Montross	North Carolina	Allan Houston	Tennessee
Associated Press	Bobby Hurley	Duke	J. R. Rider	UNLV	Billy McCaffrey	Vanderbilt
Associated Press	Jamal Mashburn	Kentucky	Glenn Robinson	Purdue	Chris Mills	Arizona
Associated Press	Chris Webber	Michigan	Rodney Rogers	Wake Forest	Nick Van Exel	Cincinnati
USBWA	Calbert Cheaney	Indiana	Grant Hill	Duke	No third team	
USBWA	Penny Hardaway	Memphis State	Billy McCaffrey	Vanderbilt	No third team	
USBWA	Bobby Hurley	Duke	J. R. Rider	UNLV	No third team	
USBWA	Jamal Mashburn	Kentucky	Glenn Robinson	Purdue	No third team	
USBWA	Chris Webber	Michigan	Rodney Rogers	Wake Forest	No third team	
NABC	Calbert Cheaney	Indiana	Grant Hill	Duke	Terry Dehere	Seton Hall
NABC	Penny Hardaway	Memphis State	Eric Montross	North Carolina	Allan Houston	Tennessee
NABC	Bobby Hurley	Duke	J. R. Rider	UNLV	Billy McCaffrey	Vanderbilt
NABC	Jamal Mashburn	Kentucky	Glenn Robinson	Purdue	Chris Mills	Arizona
NABC	Chris Webber	Michigan	Rodney Rogers	Wake Forest	Nick Van Exel	Cincinnati
UPI	Calbert Cheaney	Indiana	Terry Dehere	Seton Hall	Josh Grant	Utah
UPI	Penny Hardaway	Memphis State	Grant Hill	Duke	Ervin Johnson	New Orleans
UPI	Bobby Hurley	Duke	J. R. Rider	UNLV	Billy McCaffrey	Vanderbilt
UPI	Jamal Mashburn	Kentucky	Glenn Robinson	Purdue	Chris Mills	Arizona
UPI	Chris Webber	Michigan	Rodney Rogers	Wake Forest	Eric Montross	North Carolina

AP Honorable Mention

- Vin Baker, Hartford
- Parrish Casebier, Evansville
- Sam Crawford, New Mexico State
- Bill Curley, Boston College
- Yinka Dare, George Washington
- Tony Dunkin, Coastal Carolina
- Acie Earl, Iowa
- Doug Edwards, Florida State
- Michael Finley, Wisconsin
- James Forrest, Georgia Tech
- Jamie Gladden, Xavier
- Greg Graham, Indiana
- Brian Grant, Xavier
- Josh Grant, Utah
- Thomas Hill, Duke
- Juwan Howard, Michigan
- Bobby Hopson, Wagner
- Lindsey Hunter, Jackson State
- Ervin Johnson, New Orleans
- Adonis Jordan, Kansas
- Jason Kidd, California
- Warren Kidd, Middle Tennessee State
- George Lynch, North Carolina
- Aaron McKie, Temple
- Darnell Mee, Western Kentucky
- Lawrence Moten, Syracuse
- Stacey Poole, Florida
- Bryant Reeves, Oklahoma State
- James Robinson, Alabama
- Jalen Rose, Michigan
- Stevin Smith, Arizona State
- Darrick Suber, Rider
- Bob Sura, Florida State
- Dedan Thomas, UNLV
- Gary Trost, Brigham Young
- Rex Walters, Kansas
- Charlie Ward, Florida State
