= James Forrest (basketball) =

American basketball player (born 1972)

Personal information
- Born: August 13, 1972 (age 54) Charleston, South Carolina, U.S.
- Listed height: 6 ft 8 in (2.03 m)
- Listed weight: 240 lb (109 kg)

Career information
- High school: Southside (Atlanta, Georgia)
- College: Georgia Tech (1991–1995)
- NBA draft: 1995: undrafted
- Position: Power forward / Center

Career history
- 1996–1997: Hapoel Eilat
- 1997–1998: Ciudad de Huelva
- 1998: Hapoel Eilat
- 1998–1999: Mabo Pistoia
- 1999–2000: Iraklio
- 2000–2001: Aris Thessaloniki
- 2001–2002: Olympiacos Piraeus
- 2002–2003: Olympia Larissa
- 2003: Unicaja Málaga
- 2003–2004: Iraklio
- 2004: Basket Livorno
- 2004: Scavolini Pesaro
- 2004–2005: Fabriano Basket

Career highlights
- Italian League All-Star (1998); Greek Cup winner (2002); Greek League All-Star (1999); First-team All-ACC (1994); Third-team All-ACC (1995); ACC tournament MVP (1993); McDonald's All-American (1991); First-team Parade All-American (1991); 2× Mr. Georgia Basketball (1989, 1990)
- Stats at Basketball Reference

James Curtnyle Forrest (born August 13, 1972) is an American former professional basketball player.

== High school career ==
He was born in Charleston, South Carolina but he then moved to Atlanta, Georgia with his family and attended Southside High School (now Maynard H. Jackson) there. He established himself as one of the top recruits of the state of Georgia and as a sophomore he was named Mr. Georgia Basketball; he won the award again the following year, having been part of the Southside team that won the state championship in 1990, winning the final game against Columbia with a final record of 31–2. In his senior year at Southside High he averaged 30.5 points and 11.4 rebounds, and scored 55 points and grabbed 19 rebounds in a playoff semifinals game against Dougherty on March 8, 1991, during the state championship. He was also a two-time Georgia Gatorade Player of the Year (1990 and 1991). He was ranked among the top 10 seniors in the nation by most scouting reports. During his high school career he scored more than 2,000 points; scout Bob Gibbons compared Forrest to Larry Johnson due to similarities in size, scoring ability and physical strength. In 1991 he was also named in the Parade All-America First Team and was a McDonald's All-American. In the McDonald's All-American Game of 1991 he was the top scorer of the East team and the second highest scorer of the game (only Chris Webber had more points, with 28), and also added 10 rebounds. In March 1991 Forrest announced his commitment to play for Georgia Tech.

== College career ==
Forrest and point guard Travis Best were considered the top two freshmen of the 1991–92 Georgia Tech team that had lost its star player, Kenny Anderson, who decided to declare for the 1991 NBA draft. They both started in the team along with Jon Barry, Malcolm Mackey and Matt Geiger. Forrest scored 16 points in his debut on November 20, 1991, against James Madison. Forrest had a very good season, being the third top scorer (13.3) and the third best rebounder (6.4) in the team. While he mainly played as power forward and center during his high school career, the presence of Mackey made him move to the small forward position. Forrest's freshman season is also remembered for one of the most iconic buzzer beaters in the history of the NCAA Tournament: during the Midwest Regional second-round game against USC, Georgia Tech was losing 78–76. With 0.8 seconds remaining, Geiger inbounded the ball to Forrest, who scored a 3-point shot (his only one of the season, having missed the previous 3 attempts) for a 79–78 win that qualified Georgia Tech for the Sweet 16.

Forrest improved significantly in his sophomore year and became the top scorer of the team during the 1992–93 season with an average of 19.5 points. He won the Everett Case Award as the MVP of the 1993 ACC men's basketball tournament and was an honorable mention in the All-ACC selection at the end of the season. At some point before the 1993 NBA draft, it seemed that Forrest could be planning to declare early for the draft, and some mock drafts predicted him to be a top-15 pick, but he decided to stay at Georgia Tech and continue to play college basketball. His junior season saw the departure of Mackey, and Forrest became the top rebounder of the team, and once again he was the top scorer, with Georgia Tech finishing 6th in the ACC conference. In March 1994 he was named in the All-ACC First team. Forrest's senior season was marked by his best rebounding average (8.3), but his scoring declined (18.8 points), while his teammate Travis Best scored 20.2. At the end of the season he was named in the All-ACC Third team and was an NCAA All-American honorable mention.

=== College statistics ===
Year	Team	GP	GS	MPG	FG%	3P%	FT%	RPG	APG	SPG	BPG	PPG
1991–92	Georgia Tech	35	34	29.9	.509	.250	.708	6.4	1.8	0.9	0.5	13.3
1992–93	Georgia Tech	30	29	34.5	.542	.500	.687	7.5	1.4	1.0	0.9	19.5
1993–94	Georgia Tech	25	22	34.5	.468	.000	.716	7.9	1.4	0.8	0.7	19.0
1994–95	Georgia Tech	24	23	34.6	.488	.000	.664	8.3	1.6	1.4	1.0	18.8
Career		114	108	33.1	.503	.167	.694	7.4	1.6	1.0	0.8	17.4

== Professional career ==
After the end of his senior season, Forrest was automatically eligible for the 1995 NBA draft. While his teammate Best was selected with the 23rd pick by the Indiana Pacers, Forrest was not drafted, and in August had to undergo surgery for an injury to the Achilles tendon. He came back in 1996, and since he did not find a team in the United States, he began his professional career abroad. His first team was Hapoel Eilat of the Israeli top division. He averaged 14.5 points and 7.8 rebounds in 20 games during the 1996–97season, with a season high of 26 points versus Hapoel Holon. In July 1997 he was signed by the Los Angeles Lakers, but he was cut in October and he did not make the final roster. He then moved to Spain, signing with Ciudad the Huelva of Liga ACB in November 1997, and played 12 games averaging 18.8 points (with a season high of 31) and 5.9 rebounds. He moved to Italy for the following season, playing for Mabo Pistoia where he averaged 19.6 points and 9.3 rebounds in 37.0 minutes of playing time. The club did not participate in the following season and Forrest moved to Greece, signing a deal with Iraklio. He played 4 consecutive seasons in the Greek league, changing team every year: Iraklio, Aris Thessaloniki, Olympiacos (where he had the chance to play in the EuroLeague where he averaged 12.5 points and 6.0 rebounds) and Olympia Larissa.

He briefly came back to Spain in 2003 and played 1 game with Unicaja Málaga, then played once more for Itaklio where he averaged 17.5 points and 7.2 rebounds. He then played in Italy for 2 more seasons, and retired in 2005 after having played for Fabriano.
