= Nittany Lion Inn =

Hotel at Pennsylvania State University

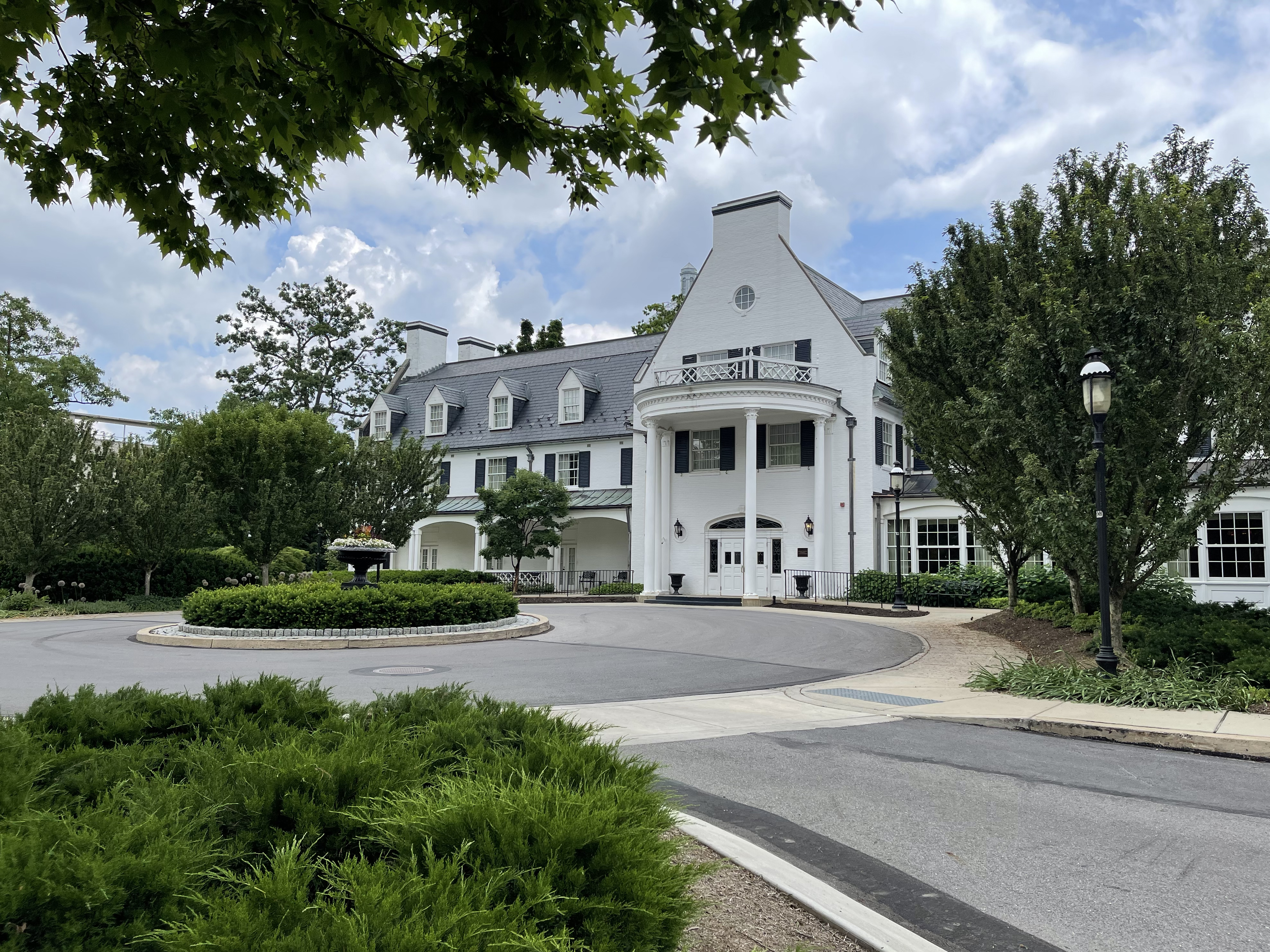
- The east entrance of the Nittany Lion Inn on the campus of Penn State University in State College, Pa.

General information
- Status: Open
- Architectural style: Georgian-style
- Location: 200 W Park Ave, State College, PA, United States
- Coordinates: 40.7975°N 77.8708°W
- Groundbreaking: May 1, 1930
- Opened: April 15, 1931; 95 years ago
- Renovated: January, 1953; October, 1990; June, 2023
- Renovation cost: $1,072,000 (equivalent to $12,900,000 in 2025) $15,000,000 (equivalent to $36,965,104 in 2025) $10,000,000 (equivalent to $10,566,841 in 2025)
- Owner: Scholar Hotel group
- Landlord: Pennsylvania State University

Technical details
- Floor count: 3

Design and construction
- Developer: Consolidated Hotel Service Inc.
- Awards: AAA Four Diamond Award
- Designations: Historic Hotels of America

Other information
- Number of rooms: 223
- Number of restaurants: 2
- Number of bars: 1

Website
- Official website

The Nittany Lion Inn is a hotel located on the campus of Pennsylvania State University in State College, Pennsylvania, near the Nittany Lion Shrine and Rec Hall. The original hotel was built by Consolidated Hotel Service Inc., and opened in 1931; it has been renovated several times since then.

== History ==
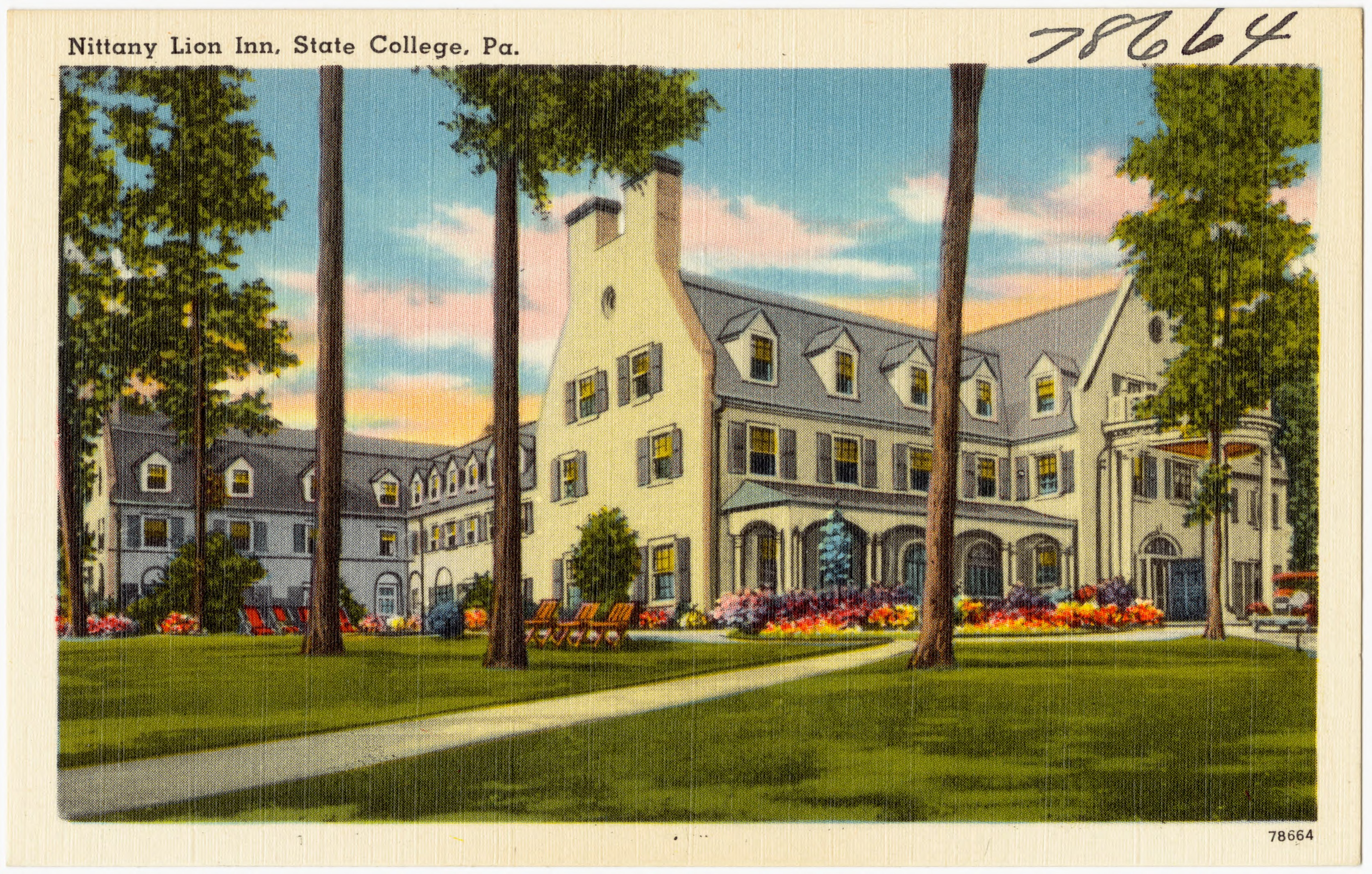
Nittany Lion Inn between circa 1930 and circa 1945

A 75-room colonial style inn, planned for development on the campus of Pennsylvania State University, was announced in March 1930. The development and operation of the Inn was managed New York City company Consolidated Hotel Service Inc. as the newest in a chain of 11 college hotels as a part of Treadway Inns. The project broke ground on May 1, 1930, with 65 workers employed. The lot in which the Inn was built on was located behind New Beaver Field's west stands and near Rec Hall.

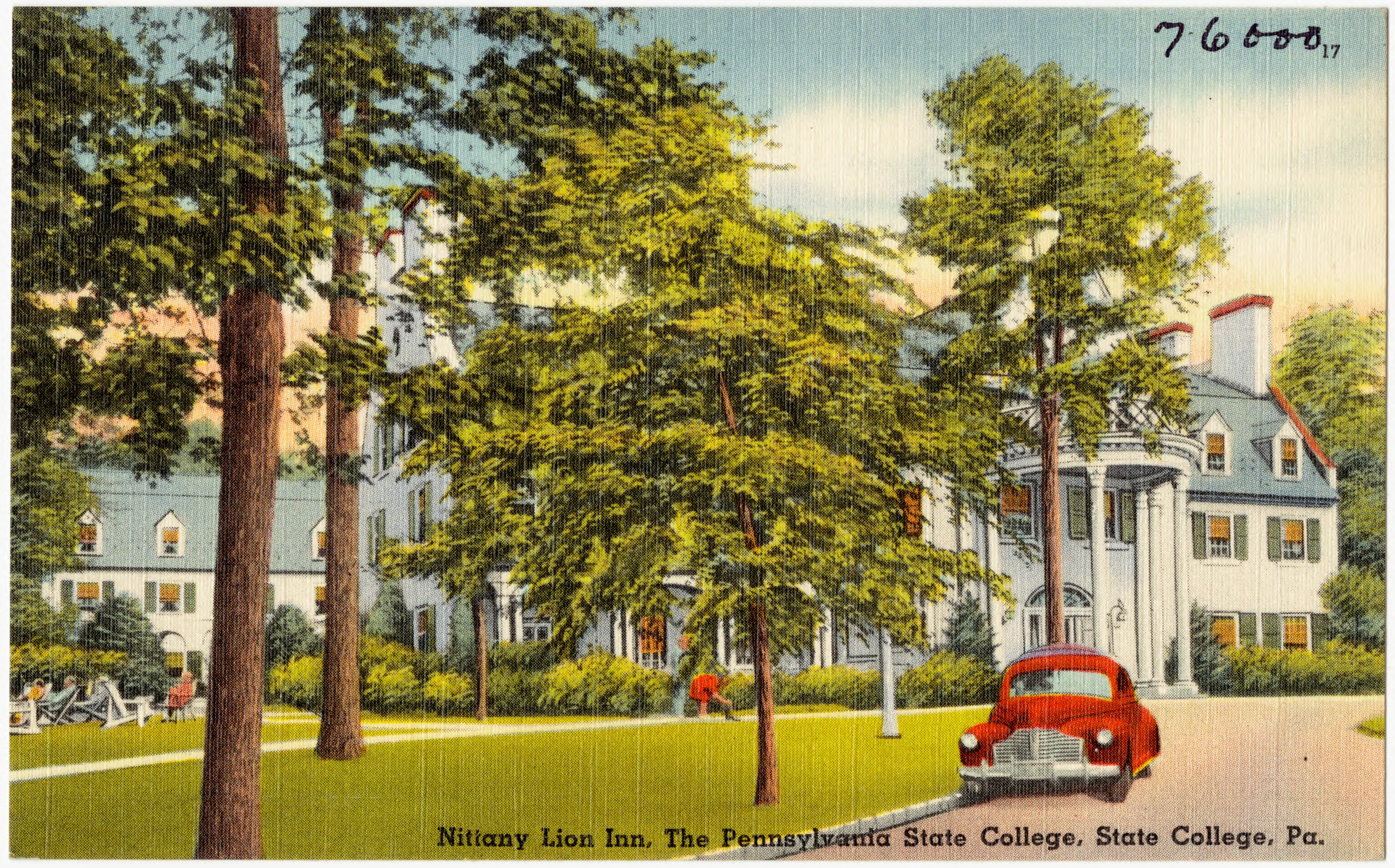
Nittany Lion Inn between circa 1930 and circa 1945

The exterior of the inn was 125 feet tall painted greenish-blue and white with a stone portico. To the left of the building was a parking garage designed similar architecture with parking spaces for 20 vehicles. Inside of the inn featured 75 hotel rooms with the ability to accommodate 150 guests, a main dining space for 300 guests with an additional three dining spaces with room for 175 patrons in each. The entire hotel was furnished in the colonial style. The Nittany Lion Inn was formally opened to the public on May 5, 1931. To celebrate the opening 250 trustees and faculty were invited to the inn for a dinner and dance. The initial cost of a stay at the Nittany Lion Inn was $3.50 a night.

The Nittany Lion Inn was expanded in January 1953 with the addition of an east wing. The wing contained a grill, a meeting room and 75 hotel rooms bringing the total available to 150. The project was completed by Irwin and Leighton, a Philadelphia contractor, at a cost of $1,072,000 (equivalent to $12,900,000 in 2025).

A 15-foot sinkhole opened up on the grounds of the inn after a limestone cavern wore away in early April 1957. The sinkhole damaged a sewer line and was repaired shortly after its collapse.

A 132,000 square foot expansion and renovation took place on the Nittany Lion Inn in October 1990. The expansion added alumni offices, a lounge, 4 handicapped-accessible rooms, 500-seat ballroom, multiple meeting room, indoor hot tub, Gift shop, workout facility, enclosed atrium, expanded kitchen space and 136 guest rooms bring the total hotel rooms to 223. The Inn's main entrance was also moved to the north side of the building facing Park Avenue. The Inn also received new furniture influenced by 18th-century Chippendale, Sheraton and Hepplewhite styles. The renovations were completed in January 1992 by Biehn Construction at a cost of $15,000,000 (equivalent to $36,965,104 in 2025). During the renovation of the Inn, the International Union of Operating Engineers, Local No. 66, protested the use of a non-union contractor Stone Valley Construction Company, a subcontractor of Biehn Construction.

The Nittany Lion Inn was converted into temporary student housing and classrooms in 2020 due to the COVID-19 pandemic. Initially the space was used as a quarantine dormitory for infected students. It was announced that the hotel would continue to serve as student housing through the 2021–2022 academic year with no set plan to return to operation.

The Penn State Board of Trustees approved a ground lease for The Nittany Lion Inn with the Scholar Hotel Group in June 2022. Scholar Hotel group also owns Hyatt Place State College, Scholar Hotel State College, Residence Inn by Marriott State College and Courtyard by Marriott State College. The duration of the ground lease and the sale amount received by Penn State remains undisclosed.

The Scholar Hotel Group announced an estimated $10 million renovation would begin in 2023. Renovation construction began June 1, 2023 focused on the exterior with repainting, roof replacement and window replacement. Whiskers and The Dining Room, two previously named restaurants, underwent redevelopment and rebranding. The result was the creation of two new spaces, featuring an integrated cocktail bar and lounge within the restaurant and a café in the lobby area.

With the sale approval the University announced the Nittany Lion Inn is announced to remain closed until 2024.

Officially reopened on September 3, 2024, following a full renovation led by Rockbridge and Scholar Hotels. The reopening was marked by a ribbon-cutting ceremony attended by Penn State University President Neeli Bendapudi, Happy Valley Adventure Bureau President Fritz Smith, and Scholar Hotels CEO Gary Brandeis. Originally opened in 1931, the Inn has been a central gathering place for Penn State University events, including game-day celebrations, weddings, corporate functions, and reunions.

The renovation introduced a modern yet classic aesthetic, with updated lobby, guest rooms, meeting spaces, and public areas. The decor balances dark wooden furnishings and moldings with blue and white accents and gleaming white marble, reflecting Penn State's signature colors. The hotel offers 230 guest rooms with modern amenities, including large flat-screen TVs and Amouage bath products. Additionally, it boasts over 12,000 square feet of flexible meeting space for corporate and social events.

New food and beverage outlets have been introduced, including:

Lionne & 1855 Lounge – A dining restaurant featuring cuisine by Executive Chef Mirko Loeffler, with a wine list and signature dishes like 30-day aged ribeye steak and the iconic Nittany Lion Inn Lobster Bisque. Triplett’s – A dining spot named after Wally Triplett, one of Penn State’s first Black football players and a figure behind the cry "We Are Penn State!" Dear Joe: Café and Bakery – A café offering breakfasts, grab-and-go options, and coffee. Additionally, Harpers, a downtown clothing store makes menswear and Penn State apparel.

== Famous visitors ==
- Dwight D. Eisenhower
- Lyndon B. Johnson
- Eleanor Roosevelt
- George H. W. Bush
- Louis Armstrong
- Robert Frost
- Danny DeVito
- Jack Nicholson
- George Howard Earle III
- Joseph F. Guffey
- Styles Bridges
- Felix Schnyder
- George M. Leader
