= New Beaver Field =

Stadium in Pennsylvania, US, 1909–1959

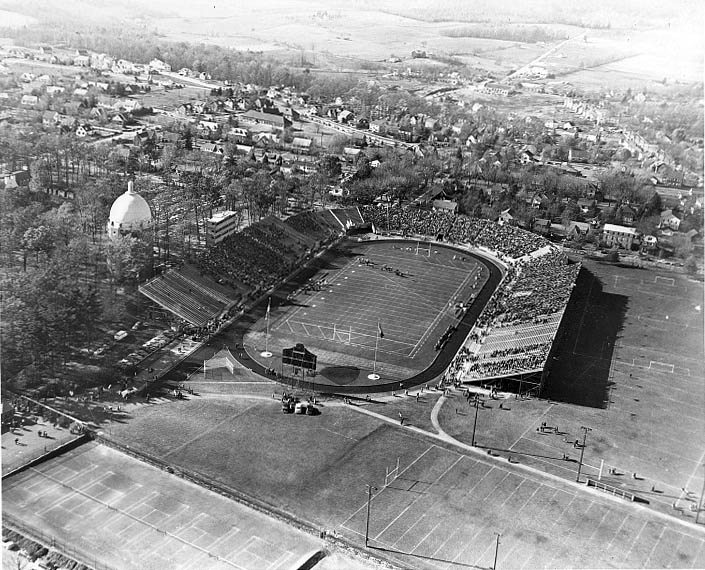
- New Beaver Field
- Interactive map of New Beaver Field
- Full name: New Beaver Field
- Location: University Park, Pennsylvania
- Coordinates: 40°47′48″N 77°52′11″W
- Owner: Penn State University
- Operator: Penn State University
- Capacity: 30,000

Construction
- Groundbreaking: 1907
- Opened: 1909; 117 years ago Capacity 1,200
- Expanded: 1915 Capacity 6,000; 1920 Capacity 16,000 (expandable to 20,000); 1924 Press box added 1934Capacity 14,700; 1949Capacity 27,720
- Closed: 1959; 67 years ago
- Cost: $23,000 (equivalent to $824,167 in 2025)

Tenants
- Penn State football (1909–1959); Penn State men's soccer (1911–1959); Penn State baseball (1909–1959); Penn State men's lacrosse; Penn State track and field

New Beaver Field was a stadium in University Park, Pennsylvania. It served as the third home of the Penn State University Nittany Lions football team, hosting the team until they moved in 1960 to Beaver Stadium. It was built to replace the original Beaver Field (1892–1908), retroactively called Old Beaver Field, which had a capacity of 500 and stood between present-day Osmond and Frear Laboratories. Prior to this, the team played on Old Main Lawn, a grassy area outside the main classroom building of the time.

New Beaver Field was built to the northeast of Rec Hall on the present sites of the Nittany Lion Inn and the Nittany Parking Deck and held 30,000 people at its peak. In addition to football, the stadium had a track as well as baseball, lacrosse, and soccer fields. In 1959, the entire structure was disassembled and moved to the northeast corner of campus, where it was reassembled and bolted onto a modern grandstand to form Beaver Stadium. Portions of the original 1909 facility are still in use today. The stadium is named after James A. Beaver, who was a governor of Pennsylvania and a member of the school's board of trustees.

== History ==
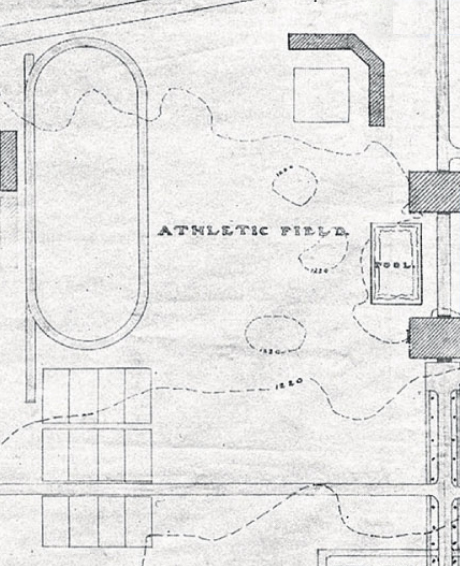
Proposed plans for the New Beaver Field.

In the early 1900s Penn State announced its plans to create an athletic complex northeast of Rec Hall on undeveloped land. The complex would contain a football field, track, lacrosse field, soccer field and baseball field. Making way for the new athletic fields, construction began by leveling the 18 acres of land the complex would sit on. The university was loaned wagons and scrapers for the project by alumnus A. C. Reed and the team of workers led by Bellefonte, Pennsylvania builder R. B. Taylor began to clear the land. Once completed the team of builders began digging drainage ditches and laying water pipes for upkeep of the fields. The construction team was paid a total of $15,000 (equivalent to $537,500 in 2025) for the excavation and $8,000 (equivalent to $286,667 in 2025) for ditch and pipe work bringing the total cost to $23,000 (equivalent to $824,167 in 2025).The state of Pennsylvania appropriated $15,000 for the field complex project. The university repurposed the existing grandstands from the old Beaver Field which sat 200 and built two wooden bleachers on either side that sat 1,000 people, giving the stadium an initial total capacity of 1,200. Once finished the 17-acre complex was one of the largest athletic fields in the United States.

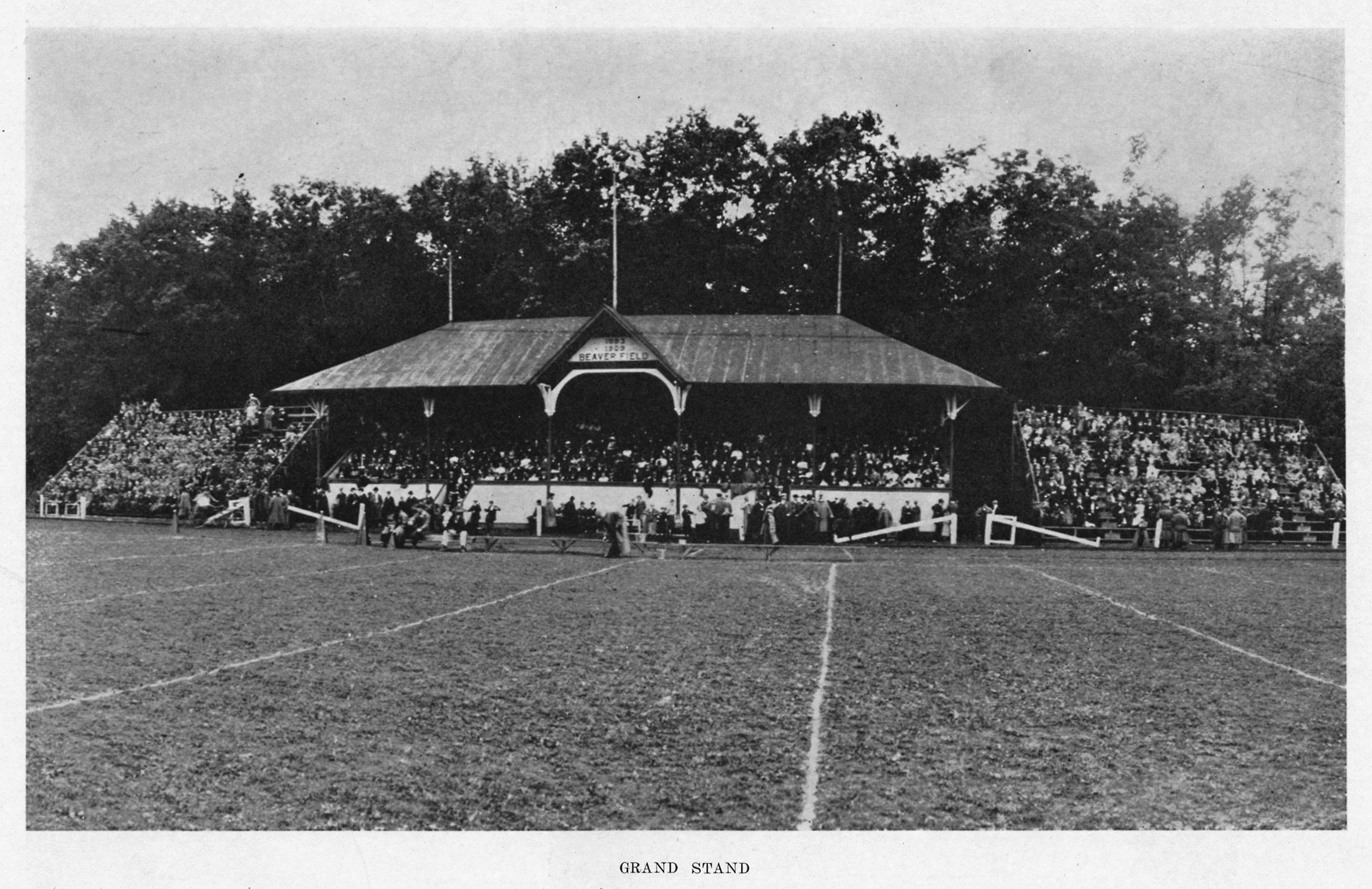
View of a grandstand during a Penn State football game vs Bucknell University on Nov. 12, 1910.

As construction was finishing a name had yet to be given to the field complex. This stirred up a debate amongst alumni and students about what the field should be named. Many wanted to keep the name Beaver Field to honor James A. Beaver the former governor of Pennsylvania and university board of trustees president that helped secure funding for the former field. Others suggested that the field should be named after George W. Atherton the former president of the university who had died just years earlier. The field was dedicated on May 7, 1909, at an interscholastic track meet hosted by the university. The new complex received the name New Beaver Field with the former Beaver Field being retroactively renamed Old Beaver Field. Around 200 meet invitations were sent to high school teams around Pennsylvania.

As Penn State's football, soccer, and lacrosse teams began playing home games on New Beaver Field, crowds easily filled the 1,200-capacity grandstands. The university continued to expand the seating capacity by building wood bleachers onto the existing grandstands. A total of 4,800 bleacher seats were added by the end of the 1920s, bringing the total capacity of the stadium to 6,000. The stadium's seating was again restructured in the early 1930s due to increased student enrollment and ticket demand. The university demolished the old grandstands and installed two larger sets of bleacher seating on both the east and west sideline.

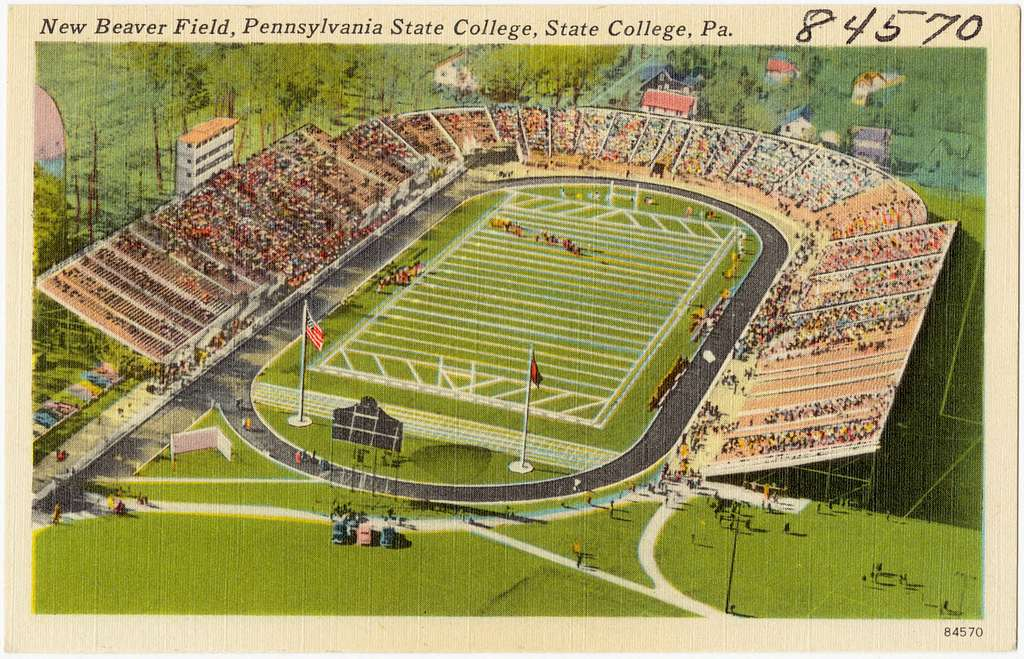
Tichnor Brothers postcard featuring New Beaver Field, ca. 1930-1945.

The new upgrades allowed around 16,000 people to attend events hosted at the field. For large events when more seating was necessary, temporary stands around the end zones were erected to form a complete bowl, bringing the total capacity to 20,000. Due to an increased press interest in the Nittany Lions, the university installed a press box in 1924. It was noted that the press box was a shack -like structure with little room for reporters.

The formerly all-wood grandstands and bleachers were replaced with steel starting in 1934. During the 1934 season, construction on the stadium cut seating capacity to 5,500. The Great Depression severely delayed the project, forcing renovations to be broken up and completed in four phases. Coming to completion in 1939, the renovation brought the seating capacity to 14,700. The steel grandstands gave the structure more of an air of permanence.

As enrollments to the university and demand for tickets grew, Penn State planned to double the size of its steel grandstand seating, allowing for a total capacity of 27,720. The renovation began in 1948 and was led by Byron J. Lambert, a grandstand patent holder and former professor at the University of Iowa; and was quickly completed by 1949.

After the 1959 season, sections of the grandstand from New Beaver Field were moved to the east end of campus, half a mile from their previous location. They were then fitted against a new upper grandstand to build the larger capacity Beaver Stadium. This portion roughly corresponds to the lower level of the current Beaver Stadium facility. There is a distinct color change when crossing between the steel grandstands that were once part of New Beaver Field and the newer, stone and concrete additions.

After the removal of the grandstands in 1959 the parcel of land that New Beaver Field was located on was repurposed to build university education buildings and eventually the Nittany Lion Inn.
