= Coleman Jennings =

American philanthropist

- Born: February 12, 1892; Johannesburg, South Africa
- Died: December 2, 1978 (aged 86); Washington, D.C., United States
- Education: Harvard University
- Occupations: Philanthropist; businessman
- Organizations: Toc H; Washington Community Chest

Coleman Jennings (February 12, 1892 – December 2, 1978) was an American philanthropist, religious leader, and businessman. He had an early career in the banking and finance field before retiring early to focus on philanthropy and community work. He founded the Washington, D.C. branch of Toc H and, in the late 1930s and early 1940s, was the president of the Community Chest of Washington, which later became a part of the United Way of America. Jennings was also a layman and speaker in the Episcopal Church.

== Early life and education ==
Coleman Jennings was born on February 12, 1892, in Johannesburg, South Africa. His father, Hennen Jennings, was a consulting mining engineer for H. Eckstein & Company in Johannesburg and, later, a consulting engineer for the United States Bureau of Mines. His mother was Mary L. Jennings. Jennings moved with his family to Washington, D.C., in 1906. He attended boarding school at the Pomfret School in Pomfret, Connecticut and later earned his A.B. at Harvard University in 1915. He also attended Harvard Law School for two years.

== Life and career ==
Jennings served in the United States Army during World War I as a First Lieutenant in the Aviation Section Signal Corps, A.E.F. In 1918, he served as an aide to President Woodrow Wilson during the Versailles Peace Conference in France. After returning from war in 1919, Jennings took a position at the Washington branch of the National City Company. He ultimately served as the branch's assistant manager. He was also a member of the board of directors of Riggs National Bank. He served as an honorary director there until his death in 1978. In 1928, Jennings retired from work in the finance field to pursue philanthropy and religious and social service.

Prior to his retirement, Jennings worked with various charitable and philanthropic organizations in the 1920s including Toc H and Associated Charities. He served on the board of Associated Charities (which later became known as the "Family Service Association") throughout the decade before working as the president of the organization into the 1930s. He also helped establish the Toc H movement in the United States, founding the first group in Washington known as "Mark 1" in 1929. He was the first chairman of the executive committee of the Washington Toc H group.

After his retirement from finance work in 1928, he spent a year studying theology at the University of Edinburgh in Scotland and, in 1930, became the associate secretary for student work at the U.S.-based National Council of the Episcopal Church. In the following years, he traveled throughout the country, often speaking as a layman to student and youth groups. Jennings was a member of St. John's Episcopal Church in Washington. Throughout the 1930s, he expanded his roles at various Washington-based charities and organizations, serving as director of the Washington Heart Association, the YMCA, the Northeast Boys' Club, the Family Service Association, and the Summer Outing Committee. He was also named the head of the Special Gifts Unit at the Community Chest of Washington in 1935. He had been working with the Community Chest in some capacity since 1928.

In 1936, he established the first U.S.-based "Coleman Jennings Boys' Club" in Washington. Members of the club performed acts of service throughout the community. The first overall "CJ Club" was founded in 1928 in Edinburgh. By 1938, other Coleman Jennings clubs were located in Vermont, Massachusetts, North Carolina, and England. In February 1938, Jennings was elected the president of the Community Chest of Washington, a position he held until the early 1940s. Also in the 1930s, Jennings was named a member of the Episcopal Church's Forward Movement Commission and a member of the council of the Washington National Cathedral. His work with the National Cathedral continued into the 1940s. In 1948, he was elected to the position of Chapter of the cathedral, and he also served on the cathedral's building and monuments and memorials committees. In 1961, he purchased the Heinz Warneke sculpture known as "The Prodigal Son" for the cathedral.

Throughout his life, Jennings was a close friend and confidant to other religious and cultural figures including Reverend Tubby Clayton (the founder of Toc H) and Howard Thurman (an author, theologian, and civil rights leader). Jennings died on December 2, 1978, of an apparent heart attack in Washington, D.C.at age 86.
