= Nittany Lion Shrine =

Large mountain lion sculpture of Penn State University

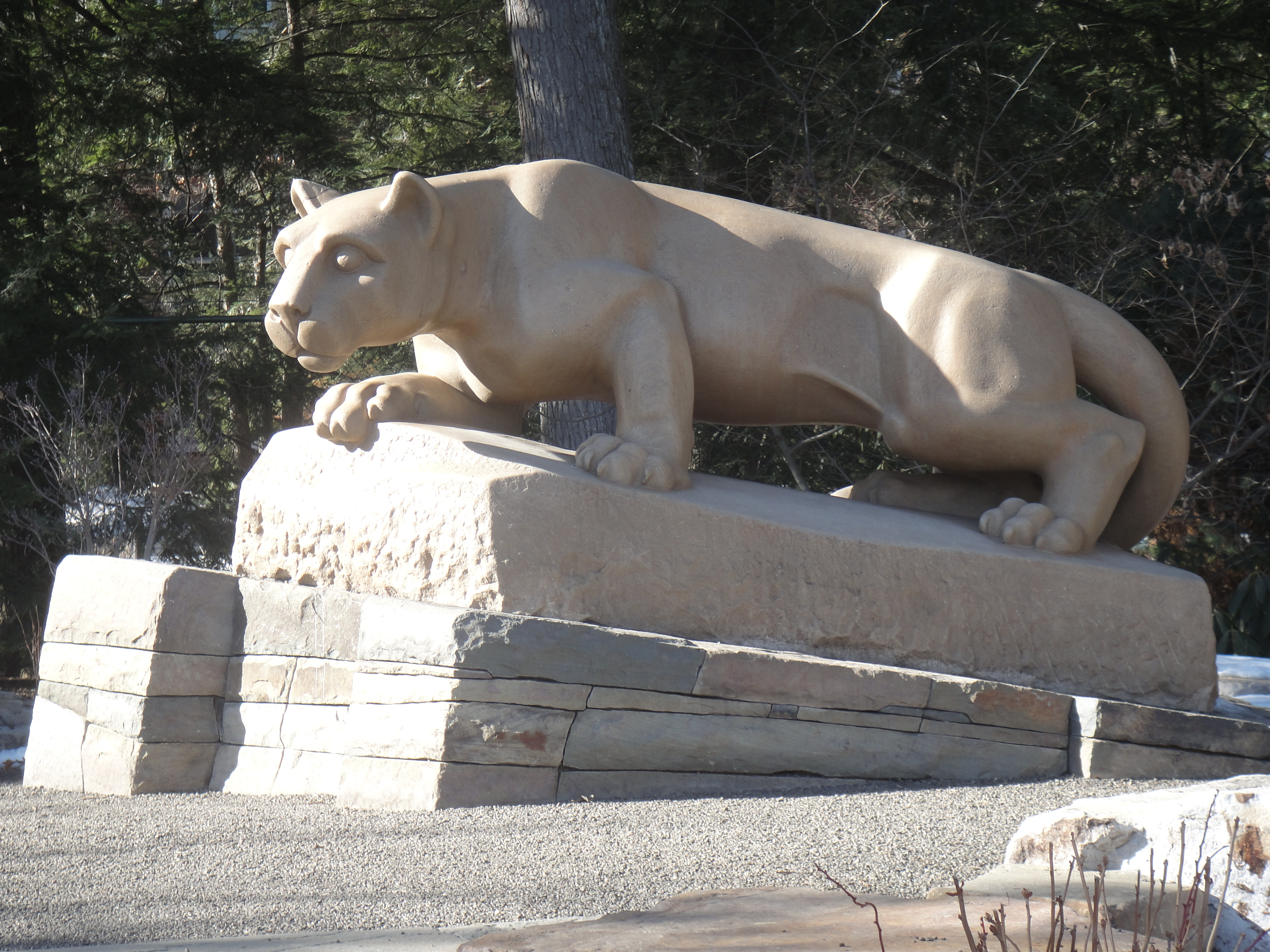
- The Lion Shrine after renovation in 2014.
- Artist: Heinz Warneke
- Year: October 24, 1942
- Type: Sculpture
- Condition: Renovated
- Location: University Park, Pennsylvania, U.S.
- Owner: Pennsylvania State University
- Accession: October 24, 1942
- Website: www.psu.edu/this-is-penn-state/nittany-lion-shrine/

The Nittany Lion Shrine is a large mountain lion sculpture carved by Heinz Warneke located at the University Park campus of Pennsylvania State University.

== History ==
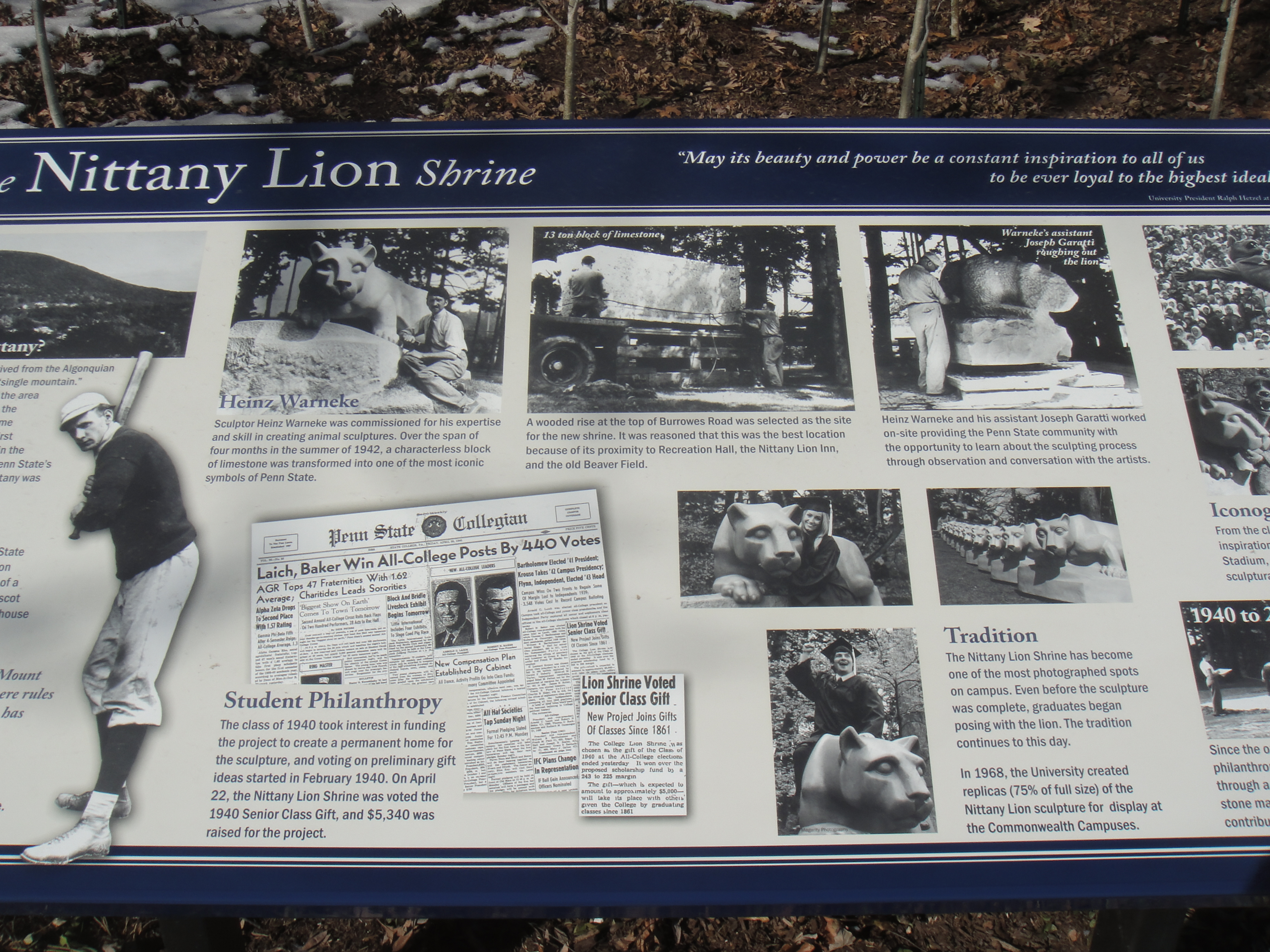
Nittany Lion Shrine

=== 20th century ===
The Nittany Lion Shrine at Pennsylvania State University was dedicated on October 24, 1942 during homecoming. Animalier Heinz Warneke and stonecutter Joseph Garatti created it from a 13-ton block of Indiana limestone. The shrine was chosen from six models submitted by Warneke.

The shrine is a gift of the class of 1940 and rests in a natural setting of trees near Recreation Building.

=== 21st century ===
In 2013, the shrine was renovated to improve the lighting, add a sidewalk, and add large decorative stones. The improvement was the gift by the Penn State's class of 2012.

=== Incidents ===
==== 20th century incidents ====
In 1966, Sue Paterno, wife of football coach Joe Paterno, and a friend secretly splashed water-soluble orange paint on the Nittany Lion Shrine the week of the Syracuse game. On November 2, 1966, six Syracuse students drove from Syracuse to State College with an old, air-loaded fire extinguisher filled with orange paint. Arriving on the Penn State campus, they found the Nittany Lion statue flood lit, deserted, and completely clean. Within minutes they painted the lion, jumped back in their car, and drove away from campus undetected.

On the way out of town, they spotted a sign for Beaver Stadium, and turned into the parking lot there, prepared to paint the field's goal posts orange as well. Stadium police guarding ABC television equipment for the Saturday game broadcast switched on the stadium lights and raced towards the end zone where the students were located. As the students fled, one of them became tangled climbing over the five-foot high chain-link fence surrounding the field. He was taken into custody by the police, and released the following morning. The students were subsequently brought before Syracuse University's student court, but the case was dismissed as a simple college prank. The Daily Orange published an editorial lauding the students and helped organize a fund of student donations to pay for the sandblasting required to remove the paint from the Nittany Lion statue, a task which was completed by game-time on November 5.

This prank reignited a tradition that had become dormant among eastern football schools' rivalries. Attempts at similar pranks were then repeated many times in subsequent years. In 1978, the Lion Shrine was vandalized when a blunt object was used to break off the statue's right ear. The original sculptor, Heinz Warneke, was alive at the time and, with some difficulty, was able to match the stone and repair the damaged ear. This incident led to the site being guarded during home football games. The right ear was vandalized again in 1997.

==== 21st century incidents ====
In 2003 and 2018, the Lion Shrine's ear was broken off again, but it was unclear whether or not it was from vandalism.

== Gallery ==
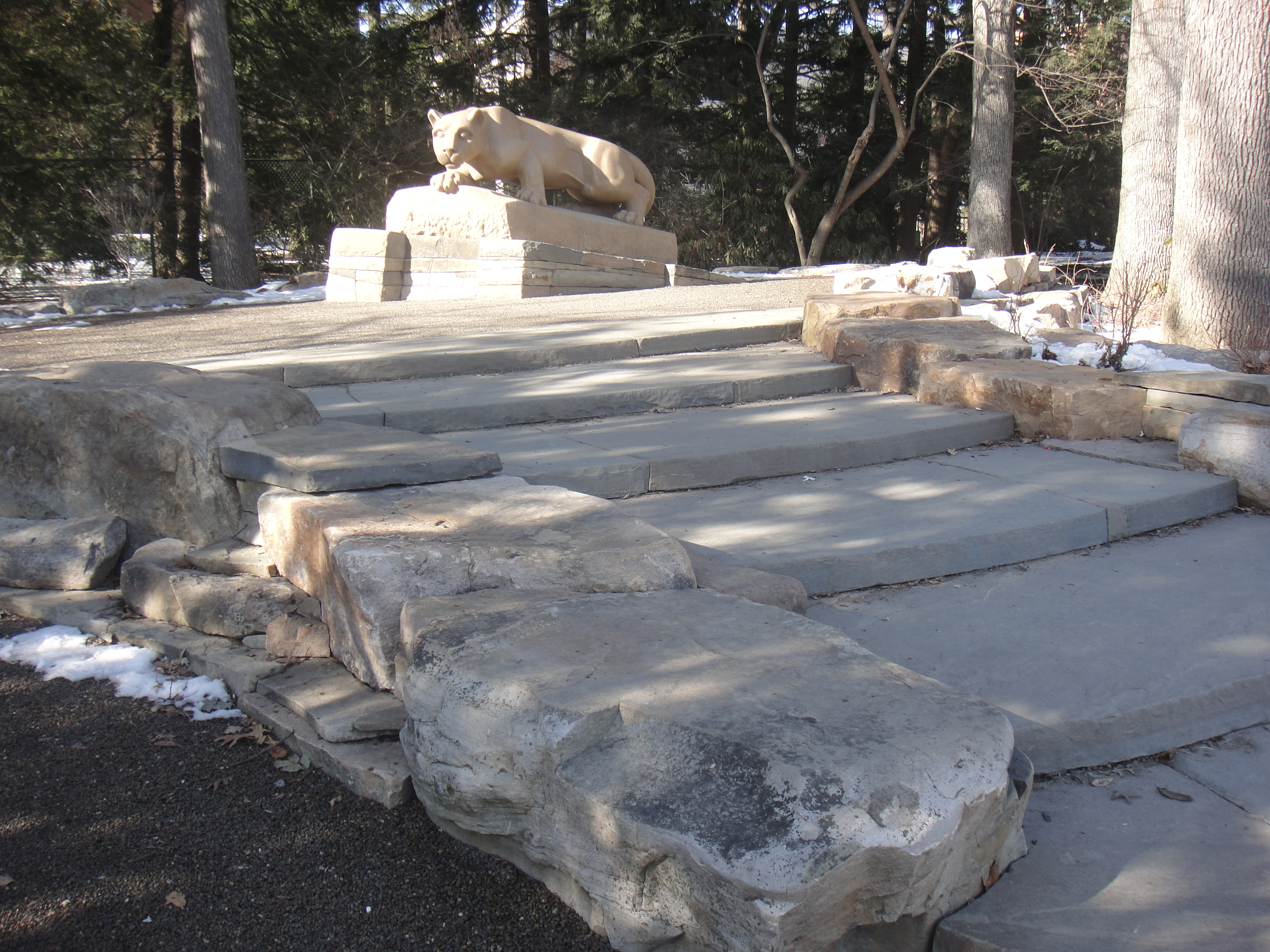

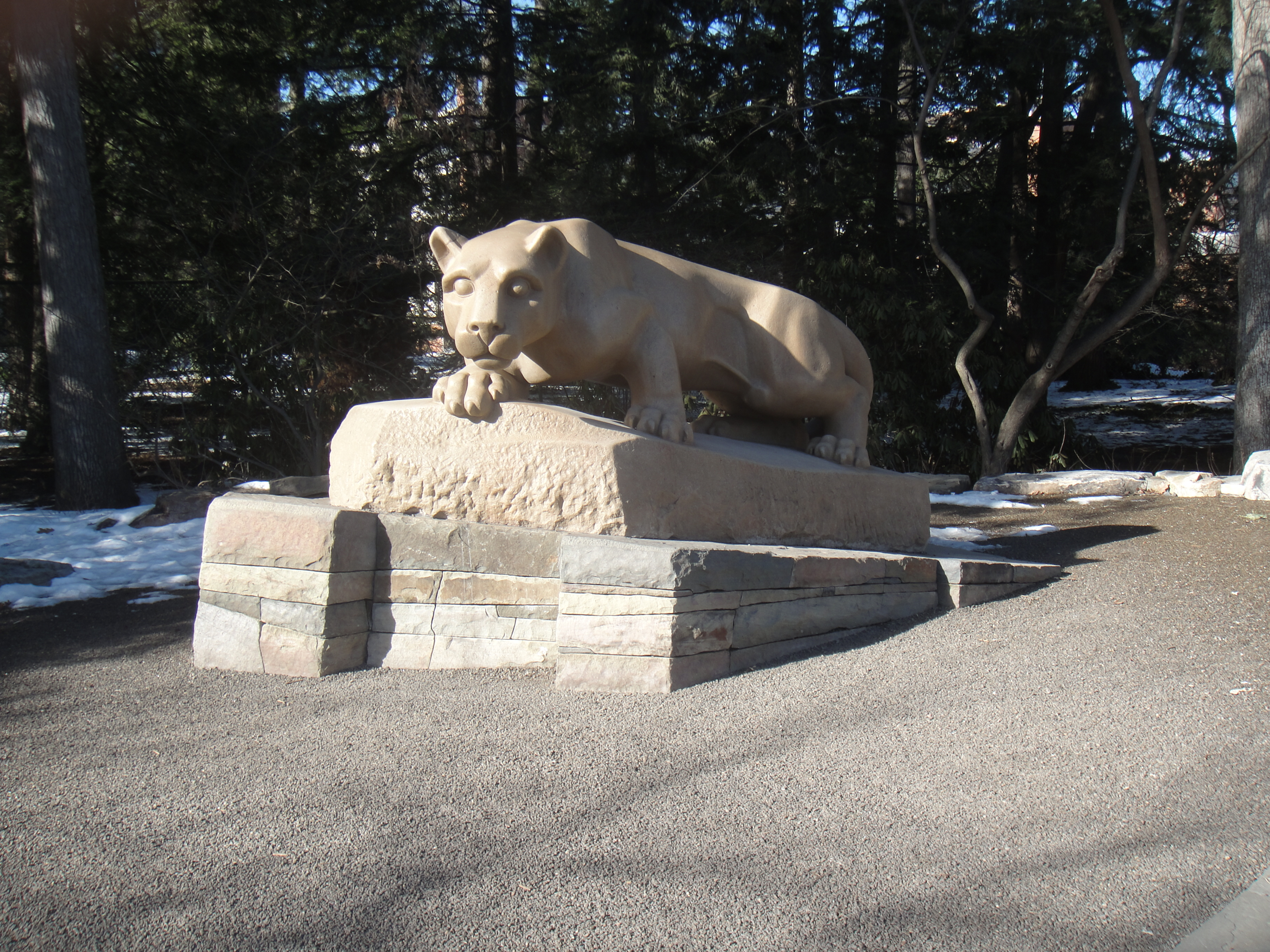

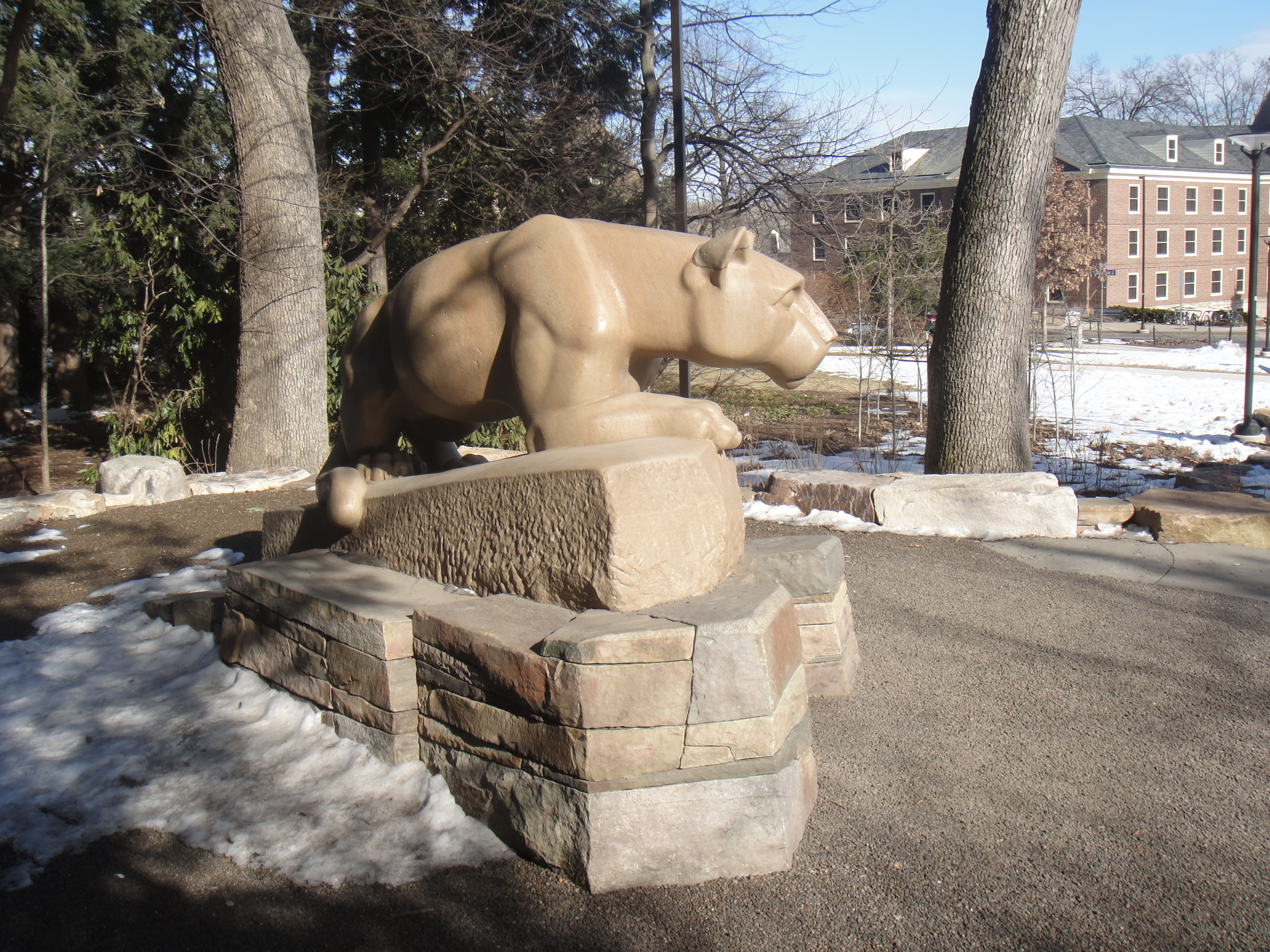

== Nittany Lion Shrine replicas ==
Almost every one of the Pennsylvania State University Commonwealth Campuses has a replica of the Nittany Lion Shrine. This gallery contains pictures from several campuses throughout Pennsylvania.

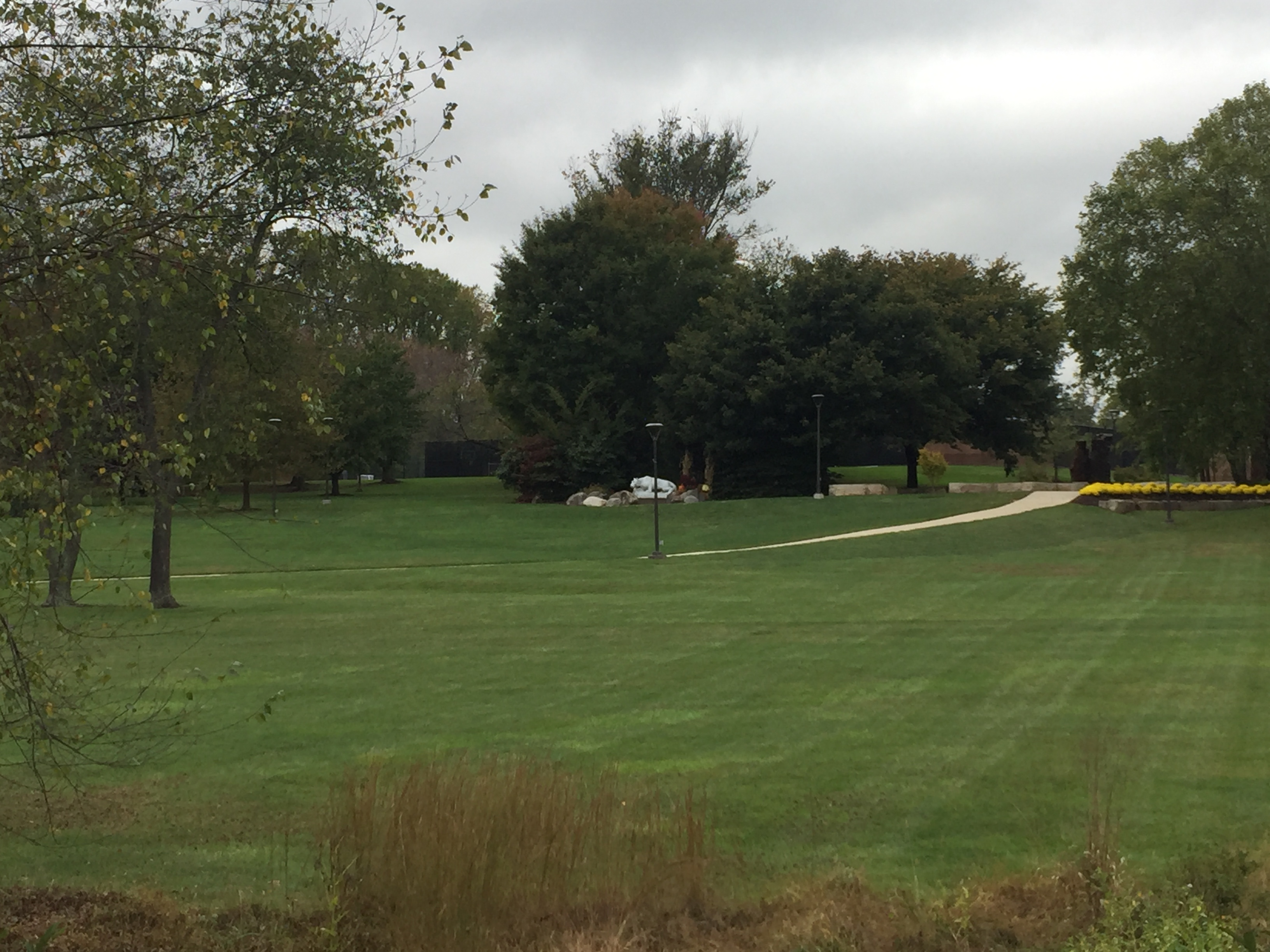
Penn State Brandywine

Penn State DuBois

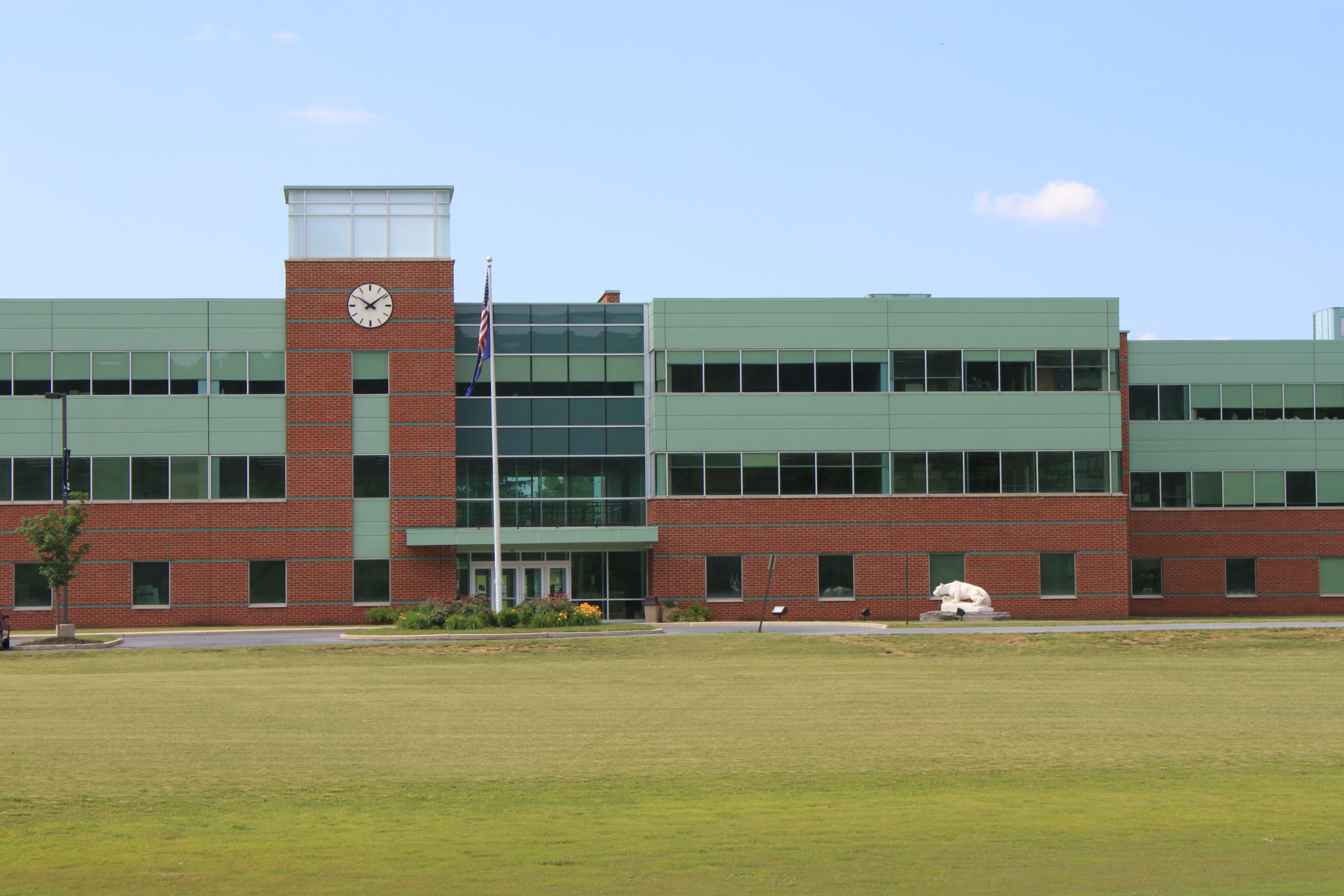
Penn State Lehigh Valley

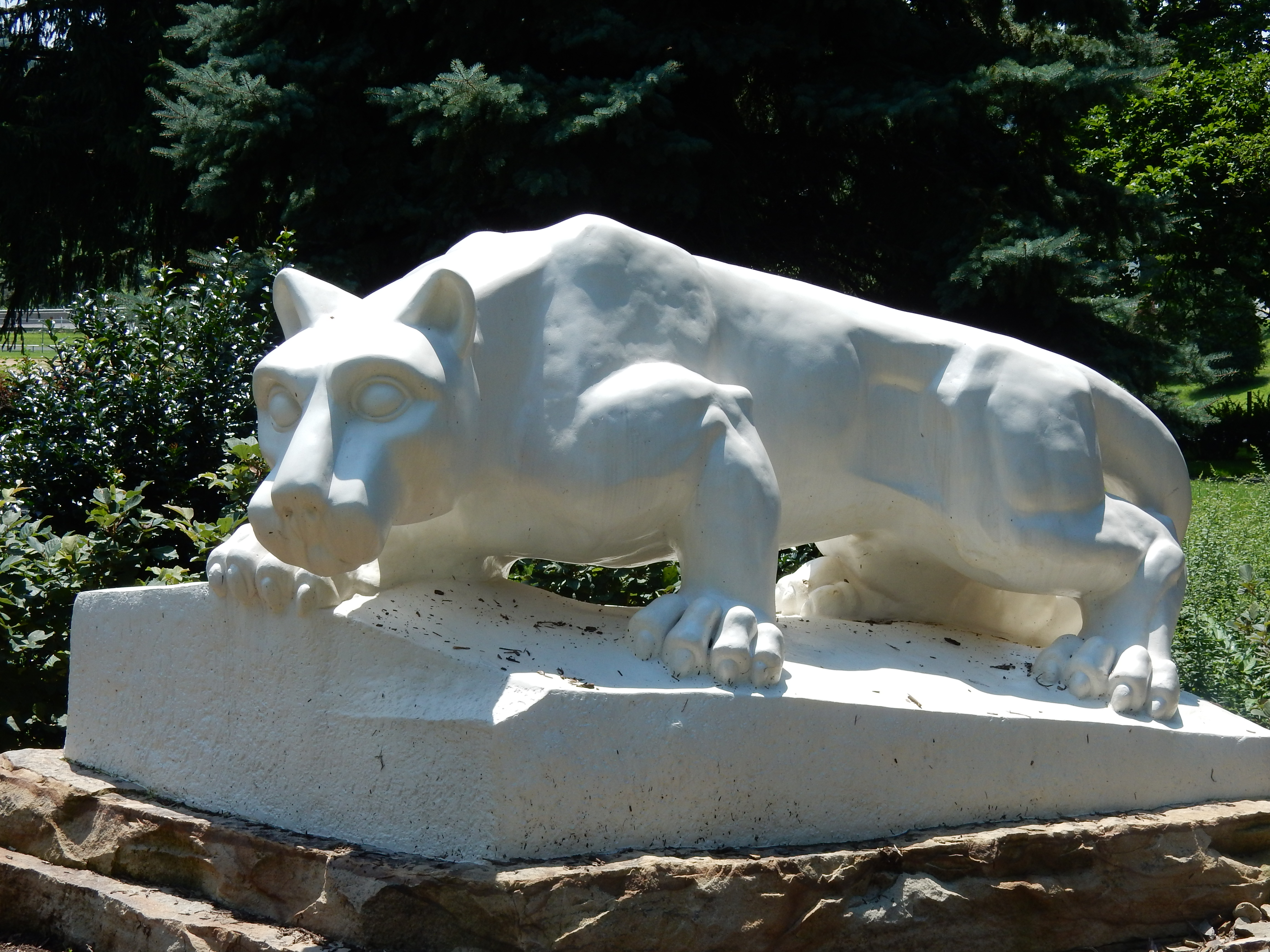
Penn State Schuylkill

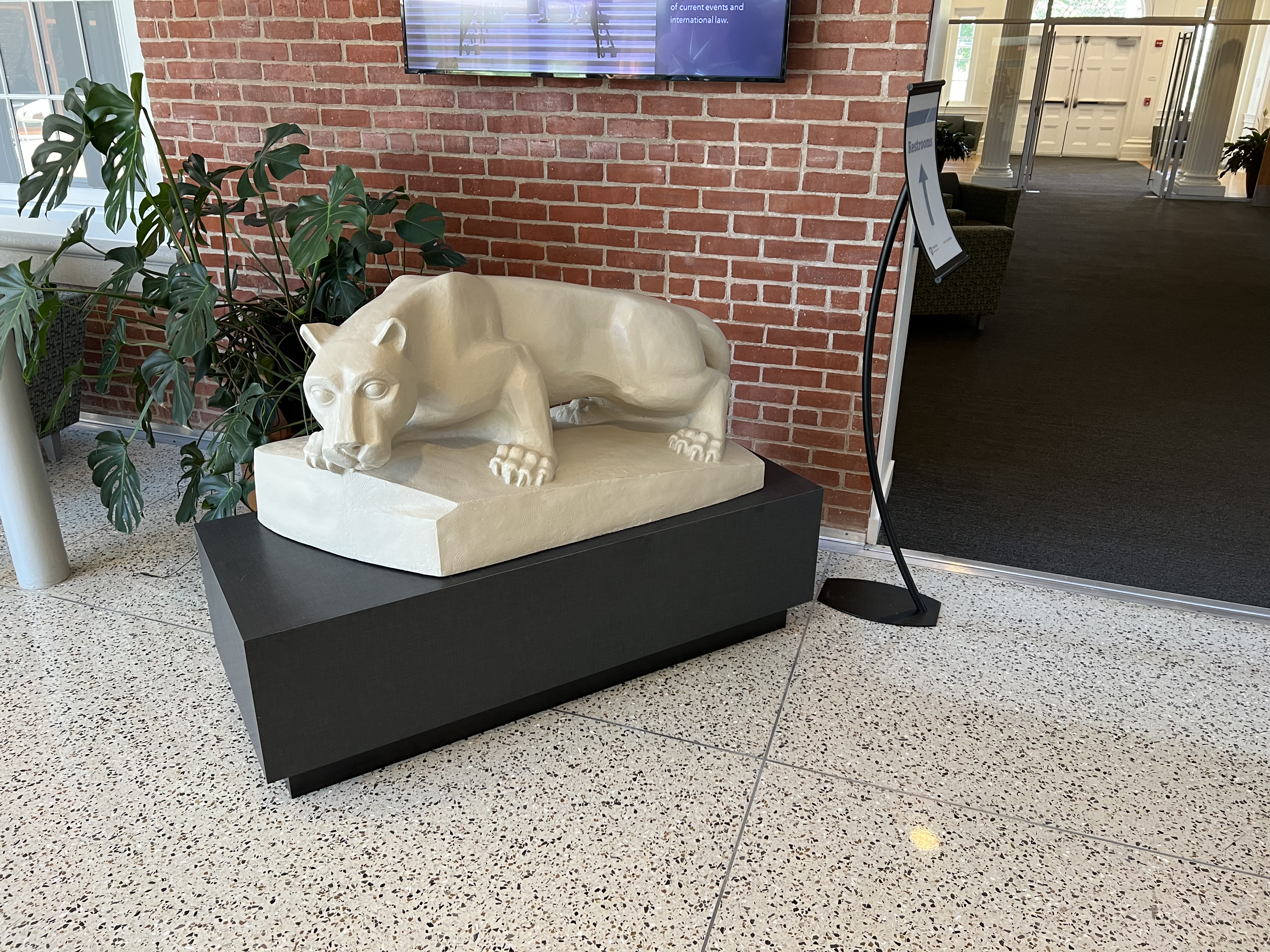
Penn State Dickinson Law
