= 1992–93 Illinois Fighting Illini men's basketball team =

American college basketball season

1992–93 Illinois Fighting Illini men's basketball

NCAA men's Division I tournament, second round
- Conference: Big Ten Conference
- Record: 19–13 (11–7 Big Ten)
- Head coach: Lou Henson (18th season)
- Assistant coaches: Dick Nagy (14th season); Jimmy Collins (10th season); Mark Coomes (8th season)
- MVP: Deon Thomas
- Captains: Tom Michael; Deon Thomas
- Home arena: Assembly Hall

1992–93 Big Ten Conference men's basketball standings
	Conf.				Overall
Team	W		L	PCT	W		L	PCT
No. 1 Indiana	17	–	1	.944	31	–	4	.886
No. 13 Iowa	11	–	7	.611	23	–	9	.719
Illinois	11	–	7	.611	19	–	13	.594
Minnesota	9	–	9	.500	22	–	10	.688
No. 22 Purdue	9	–	9	.500	18	–	10	.643
Ohio State	8	–	10	.444	15	–	13	.536
Michigan State	7	–	11	.389	15	–	13	.536
Wisconsin	7	–	11	.389	14	–	14	.500
Northwestern	3	–	15	.167	8	–	19	.296
Penn State	2	–	16	.111	7	–	20	.259
No. 3 Michigan	0	–	3	.000	0	–	4	.000
Rankings from AP Poll; *Michigan vacated all games due to NCAA sanctions. Disputed record (15-3, 31-5)

The 1992–93 Illinois Fighting Illini men's basketball team represented the University of Illinois.

== Regular season ==
After sitting out a season, Andy Kaufmann returned for the 1992–93 campaign and helped lead Illinois to a 19–13 record and trip to the NCAA tournament.

=== Roster ===
1992–93 Illinois Fighting Illini men's basketball team
Players
Coaches

Pos.	#	Name	Height	Weight	Year	Previous school	Hometown
G	3	Davin Harris	6 ft 0 in (1.83 m)	160 lb (73 kg)	Jr	Bloomington High School	Bloomington, Illinois
G	4	Brooks Taylor	6 ft 4 in (1.93 m)	190 lb (86 kg)	Sr	De La Salle High School	Chicago, Illinois
G	11	Rennie Clemons	6 ft 0 in (1.83 m)	185 lb (84 kg)	Jr	Calvary Academy	Springfield, Illinois
G	24	Richard Keene	6 ft 6 in (1.98 m)	190 lb (86 kg)	Fr	Collinsville High School	Collinsville, Illinois
F/C	25	Deon Thomas (C)	6 ft 9 in (2.06 m)	230 lb (104 kg)	RS Jr	Simeon High School	Chicago, Illinois
F	30	Robert Bennett	6 ft 6 in (1.98 m)	200 lb (91 kg)	So	Julian High School	Chicago, Illinois
F	32	Tom Michael (C)	6 ft 8 in (2.03 m)	220 lb (100 kg)	RS Jr	Carlyle High School	Hoffman, Illinois
F	33	Marc Davidson	6 ft 6 in (1.98 m)	220 lb (100 kg)	So	Aurora Christian High School	Minooka, Illinois
F	34	Andy Kaufmann	6 ft 6 in (1.98 m)	225 lb (102 kg)	RS Sr	Jacksonville High School	Jacksonville, Illinois
G	42	Gene Cross	6 ft 3 in (1.91 m)	185 lb (84 kg)	Jr	Rich Central High School	Olympia Fields, Illinois
G	44	T.J. Wheeler	6 ft 4 in (1.93 m)	190 lb (86 kg)	Jr	Christopher High School	Buckner, Illinois
F	45	Chris Gandy (redshirt)	6 ft 9 in (2.06 m)	200 lb (91 kg)	Fr	Bradley Bourbanais High School	Kankakee, Illinois
C	52	Steve Roth	6 ft 10 in (2.08 m)	240 lb (109 kg)	So	East High School	Belleville, Illinois

Head coach

- Lou Henson (New Mexico State University) (18th year)

Assistant coach(es)

- Jimmy Collins (New Mexico State) (10th year)
- Dick Nagy (Hardin-Simmons University) (14th year)
- Mark Coomes (New Mexico State) (8th year)

Legend

- (C) Team captain
- (S) Suspended
- (I) Ineligible
- (W) Walk-on
- Injured
- Current redshirt

Roster

== Schedule ==
Date time, TV	Rank^{#}	Opponent^{#}	Result	Record	Site (attendance) city, state
Non-Conference regular season
11/25/1992*		vs. Dayton; Great Alaska Shootout	W 86–78 ^{OT}	1–0	Sullivan Arena (4,393); Anchorage, AK
11/27/1992*		vs. Vanderbilt; Great Alaska Shootout	W 93–77	2–0	Sullivan Arena (6,003); Anchorage, AK
11/28/1992*		vs. New Mexico State; Great Alaska Shootout	L 94–95	2–1	Sullivan Arena (6,687); Anchorage, AK
12/3/1992*		Illinois-Chicago	W 70–68	3–1	Assembly Hall (10,943); Champaign, IL
12/5/1992*		Chicago State	W 88–61	4–1	Assembly Hall (11,568); Champaign, IL
12/11/1992*		Jackson State; Illini Classic	W 85–81	5–1	Assembly Hall (11,257); Champaign, IL
12/12/1992*		Princeton; Illini Classic	W 58–50	6–1	Assembly Hall (12,085); Champaign, IL
12/20/1992*		Mercer	W 77–58	7–1	Assembly Hall (11,614); Champaign, IL
12/23/1992*		vs. Missouri; Braggin' Rights	L 65–66	7–2	St. Louis Arena (18,379); St. Louis, MO
12/26/1992*		at Texas	L 72–89	7–3	Frank Erwin Center (14,097); Austin, TX
12/29/1992*		Marquette	L 58–61	7–4	Assembly Hall (12,235); Champaign, IL
Big Ten regular season
1/7/1993		at Northwestern; Rivalry	W 81–71	8–4 (1–0)	Welsh-Ryan Arena (8,117); Evanston, IL
1/9/1993		at Michigan State	W 52–39	9–4 (2–0)	Breslin Student Events Center (14,873); East Lansing, MI
1/16/1993		No. 6 Indiana; Rivalry	L 79–83	9–5 (2–1)	Assembly Hall (16,299); Champaign, IL
1/21/1993		Penn State	W 82–66	10–5 (3–1)	Assembly Hall (11,665); Champaign, IL
1/23/1993		at No. 5 Michigan	L 68–76	10–6 (3–2)	Crisler Arena (13,562); Ann Arbor, MI
1/27/1993		Wisconsin	W 80–72	11–6 (4–2)	Assembly Hall (11,380); Champaign, IL
1/30/1993		at Ohio State	W 86–76	12–6 (5–2)	St. John Arena (13,276); Columbus, OH
2/4/1993		No. 9 Iowa; Rivalry	W 78–77	13–6 (6–2)	Assembly Hall (14,985); Champaign, IL
2/6/1993		Northwestern; Rivalry	W 82–67	14–6 (7–2)	Assembly Hall (14,608); Champaign, IL
2/10/1993		Michigan State	W 83–80	15–6 (8–2)	Assembly Hall (12,251); Champaign, IL
2/13/1993*		No. 17 Pittsburgh	L 79–95	15–7 (8–2)	Assembly Hall (16,321); Champaign, IL
2/17/1993		at No. 1 Indiana; Rivalry	L 72–93	15–8 (8–3)	Assembly Hall (16,336); Bloomington, IN
2/20/1993		at Penn State	W 74–66	16–8 (9–3)	Rec Hall (7,455); University Park, PA
2/25/1993		No. 17 Purdue	W 78–70 ^{2OT}	17–8 (10–3)	Assembly Hall (14,096); Champaign, IL
2/28/1993		at Wisconsin	L 66–74	17–9 (10–4)	Wisconsin Field House (11,500); Madison, WI
3/3/1993		at Minnesota	L 65–67	17–10 (10–5)	Williams Arena (16,303); Minneapolis, MN
3/6/1993		Ohio State	W 85–73	18–10 (11–5)	Assembly Hall (16,321); Champaign, IL
3/10/1993		No. 3 Michigan	L 97–98 ^{OT}	18–11 (11–6)	Assembly Hall (16,321); Champaign, IL
3/13/1993		at No. 17 Iowa; Rivalry	L 53–63	18–12 (11–7)	Carver–Hawkeye Arena (15,500); Iowa City, IA
NCAA tournament
3/18/1993*	(6 W)	vs. (11 W) Long Beach State; Regional Round of 16	W 75–72	19–12	Jon M. Huntsman Center (11,493); Salt Lake City, UT
3/20/1993*	(6 W)	vs. (3 W) No. 8 Vanderbilt; Regional Quarterfinals	L 68–85	19–13	Jon M. Huntsman Center (12,084); Salt Lake City, UT
*Non-conference game. ^{#}Rankings from AP Poll. (#) Tournament seedings in parentheses. All times are in Central Time.

== Season Statistics ==
Final Individual Statistics
			Minutes		Scoring		Total FGs			3-point FGs			Free-Throws			Rebounds							
Player	GP	GS	Tot	Avg	Pts	Avg	FG	FGA	Pct	3FG	3FA	Pct	FT	FTA	Pct	Off	Def	Tot	Avg	A	TO	Blk	Stl
Thomas, Deon	32	30	1098	34.3	587	18.3	225	371	.606	0	0	.000	137	212	.646	82	174	256	8.0	37	57	42	17
Kaufmann, Andy	31	25	902	29.1	537	17.3	183	433	.423	37	106	.349	134	168	.798	54	74	128	4.1	74	112	1	17
Clemons, Rennie	29	27	857	29.6	287	9.9	105	221	.475	6	16	.375	71	113	.628	14	77	91	3.1	121	66	4	42
Keene, Richard	32	24	724	22.6	266	8.3	92	226	.407	57	145	.393	25	34	.735	9	62	71	2.2	73	58	4	25
Wheeler, T.J.	32	12	770	24.1	257	8.0	85	185	.459	27	78	.346	60	69	.870	35	75	110	3.4	75	57	2	22
Bennett, Robert	32	29	871	27.2	243	7.6	98	180	.544	0	1	.000	47	87	.540	84	132	216	6.8	16	49	21	17
Michael, Tom	30	8	379	12.6	124	4.1	41	97	.423	26	65	.400	16	23	.696	23	44	67	2.2	19	11	7	3
Davidson, Marc	30	2	306	10.2	45	1.5	17	39	.436	1	5	.200	10	17	.588	29	36	65	2.2	9	16	2	7
Harris, Davin	26	1	177	6.8	42	1.6	16	35	.457	2	9	.222	8	11	.727	6	10	16	0.6	17	21	0	9
Taylor, Brooks	31	2	360	11.6	35	1.1	12	34	.353	2	6	.333	9	16	.563	10	26	36	1.2	54	32	8	20
Roth, Steve	14	0	21	1.5	4	0.3	2	3	.667	0	0	.000	0	0	.000	2	2	4	0.3	0	0	1	0
Cross, Gene	12	0	12	1.0	2	0.2	1	2	.500	0	0	.000	0	0	.000	0	0	0	0.0	0	0	0	0
Rice, Brian	9	0	0	0.0	0	0.0	0	0	.000	0	0	.000	0	0	.000	1	0	1	0.1	1	0	0	0
Griswold, Matt	8	0	8	1.0	0	0.0	0	3	.000	0	0	.000	0	0	.000	2	1	3	0.4	0	2	0	0
Team																0	90	90			2		
Total	32		6500		2429	75.9	877	1832	.479	158	431	.367	517	750	.689	351	804	1155	36.1	496	485	92	179
Opponents	32		6500		2347	73.3	860	1926	.447	181	493	.367	446	643	.694	391	670	1061	33.2	440	428	104	212

Legend
GP	Games played	GS	Games started	Avg	Average per game
FG	Field-goals made	FGA	Field-goal attempts	Off	Offensive rebounds
Def	Defensive rebounds	A	Assists	TO	Turnovers
Blk	Blocks	Stl	Steals	High	Team high

== Awards and honors ==
- Deon Thomas
  - Fighting Illini All-Century team (2005)
  - Team Most Valuable Player
- Lou Henson
  - Big Ten Coach of the Year.

== Team players drafted into the NBA ==
Player	NBA Club	Round	Pick
