= 1992–93 Penn State Nittany Lions basketball team =

American college basketball season

1992–93 Penn State Nittany Lions men's basketball
- Conference: Big Ten Conference
- Record: 7–20 (2–16 Big Ten)
- Head coach: Bruce Parkhill (10th season)
- Home arena: Rec Hall

1992–93 Big Ten Conference men's basketball standings
	Conf.				Overall
Team	W		L	PCT	W		L	PCT
No. 1 Indiana	17	–	1	.944	31	–	4	.886
No. 13 Iowa	11	–	7	.611	23	–	9	.719
Illinois	11	–	7	.611	19	–	13	.594
Minnesota	9	–	9	.500	22	–	10	.688
No. 22 Purdue	9	–	9	.500	18	–	10	.643
Ohio State	8	–	10	.444	15	–	13	.536
Michigan State	7	–	11	.389	15	–	13	.536
Wisconsin	7	–	11	.389	14	–	14	.500
Northwestern	3	–	15	.167	8	–	19	.296
Penn State	2	–	16	.111	7	–	20	.259
No. 3 Michigan	0	–	3	.000	0	–	4	.000
Rankings from AP Poll; *Michigan vacated all games due to NCAA sanctions. Disputed record (15-3, 31-5)

The 1992–93 Penn State Nittany Lions men's basketball team represented the Pennsylvania State University during the 1992–93 NCAA Division I men's basketball season. The team was led by 10th-year head coach Bruce Parkhill, and played their home games at Rec Hall in University Park, Pennsylvania as members of the Big Ten Conference.

== Schedule ==
Date time, TV	Rank^{#}	Opponent^{#}	Result	Record	Site city, state
December 1*		at Duquesne	L 65–76	0–1	A.J. Palumbo Center; Pittsburgh, Pennsylvania
December 5*		Mount St. Mary's	W 60–55	1–1	Rec Hall; University Park, Pennsylvania
December 7*		at Miami (OH)	L 68–81	1–2	Millett Hall; Oxford, Ohio
December 9*		Akron	W 56–50	2–2	Rec Hall; University Park, Pennsylvania
December 12*		James Madison	W 75–74	3–2	Rec Hall; University Park, Pennsylvania
December 21*		Drexel	W 73–64	4–2	Rec Hall (3,212); University Park, Pennsylvania
December 23*		vs. Temple	L 61–70	4–3	
December 28*		at Toledo	W 69–60	5–3	John F. Savage Hall
January 2*		at Bowling Green State	L 65–73	5–4	Anderson Arena
January 5		Ohio State	L 68–71	5–5 (0–1)	Rec Hall; University Park, Pennsylvania
January 9		at No. 5 Indiana	L 57–105	5–6 (0–2)	Assembly Hall; Bloomington, Indiana
January 13		Northwestern	W 70–68	6–6 (1–2)	Rec Hall; University Park, Pennsylvania
January 16		No. 17 Purdue	L 54–61	6–7 (1–3)	Rec Hall; University Park, Pennsylvania
January 21		at Illinois	L 66–82	6–8 (1–4)	Assembly Hall (11,665); Champaign, Illinois
January 23		No. 14 Iowa	L 58–74	6–9 (1–5)	Rec Hall; University Park, Pennsylvania
January 30		Wisconsin	L 68–75	6–10 (1–6)	Rec Hall; University Park, Pennsylvania
February 3		at Minnesota	L 67–95	6–11 (1–7)	Williams Arena; Minneapolis, Minnesota
February 6		at Ohio State	L 59–62	6–12 (1–8)	St. John Arena; Columbus, Ohio
February 9		Indiana	L 84–88 ^{2OT}	6–13 (1–9)	Rec Hall; University Park, Pennsylvania
February 13		at Northwestern	L 58–67	6–14 (1–10)	Welsh-Ryan Arena; Evanston, Illinois
February 17		No. 5 Michigan	L 70–80	6–15 (1–11)	Rec Hall; University Park, Pennsylvania
February 20		Illinois	L 66–74	6–16 (1–12)	Rec Hall (7,455); University Park, Pennsylvania
February 24		at Iowa	L 38–58	6–17 (1–13)	Carver–Hawkeye Arena; Iowa City, Iowa
March 3		at Wisconsin	W 62–58	7–17 (2–13)	Wisconsin Field House; Madison, Wisconsin
March 6		Minnesota	L 41–67	7–18 (2–14)	Rec Hall; University Park, Pennsylvania
March 11		at No. 18 Purdue	L 49–57	7–19 (2–15)	Mackey Arena; West Lafayette, Indiana
March 13		at Michigan State	L 63–70	7–20 (2–16)	Breslin Student Events Center; East Lansing, Michigan
*Non-conference game. ^{#}Rankings from AP Poll. (#) Tournament seedings in parentheses. All times are in Eastern Time.
