= Greg Graham =

American basketball player (born 1970)

Personal information
- Born: November 26, 1970 (age 55) Indianapolis, Indiana, U.S.
- Listed height: 6 ft 4 in (1.93 m)
- Listed weight: 174 lb (79 kg)

Career information
- High school: Warren Central (Indianapolis, Indiana)
- College: Indiana (1989–1993)
- NBA draft: 1993: 1st round, 17th overall pick
- Drafted by: Charlotte Hornets
- Playing career: 1993–2000
- Position: Shooting guard
- Number: 20, 21, 11

Career history

Playing
- 1993–1995: Philadelphia 76ers
- 1995–1997: New Jersey Nets
- 1997: Seattle SuperSonics
- 1998: Cleveland Cavaliers
- 1997–1998: Idaho Stampede
- 1998–1999: Fort Wayne Fury
- 1999–2000: Borås Basket

Coaching
- 2005–2006: Indiana Alley Cats

Career highlights
- Third-team Parade All-American (1989); McDonald's All-American (1989)

Career NBA statistics
- Points: 938 (4.5 ppg)
- Rebounds: 219 (1.1 rpg)
- Assists: 201 (1.0 apg)
- Stats at NBA.com
- Stats at Basketball Reference

Gregory Lawrence Graham (born November 26, 1970) is an American former professional basketball player who played five seasons in the National Basketball Association (NBA).

== College career ==
Graham played collegiately for Bob Knight and the Indiana University Hoosiers, where he played alongside Calbert Cheaney, Alan Henderson and Damon Bailey.

=== College statistics ===
Year	Team	GP	GS	MPG	FG%	3P%	FT%	RPG	APG	SPG	BPG	PPG
1989–90	Indiana	29	16	21.0	.471	.387	.778	2.6	2.0	0.8	0.4	9.7
1990–91	Indiana	34	13	19.1	.510	.241	.694	2.6	1.6	1.0	0.2	8.7
1991–92	Indiana	34	16	26.3	.502	.427	.741	4.0	2.6	1.4	0.3	12.8
1992–93	Indiana	35	32	31.9	.550	.514	.825	3.2	2.9	1.3	0.2	16.5
Career		132	77	24.7	.514	.439	.766	3.1	2.3	1.1	0.2	12.0

== Professional career ==
Selected by the Charlotte Hornets in the first round (17th pick overall) of the 1993 NBA draft, he played in five NBA seasons from 1993 to 1997 for the Philadelphia 76ers, New Jersey Nets, Seattle SuperSonics and Cleveland Cavaliers. He averaged 4.5 points per game in his NBA career

Graham returned to his alma mater, Warren Central High School, to coach for 7 seasons, resigning in April, 2015 with a record of 80–74, when family considerations resulted in a move to Rhode Island. His tenure at Warren Central included three appearances in the Marion County tournament championship.
