= 1992–93 Indiana Hoosiers men's basketball team =

American college basketball season

1992–93 Indiana Hoosiers men's basketball

AP Poll regular season champions Big Ten champion

NCAA men's Division I tournament, Elite Eight
- Conference: Big Ten Conference

Ranking
- Coaches: No. 5
- AP: No. 1
- Record: 31–4 (17–1 Big Ten)
- Head coach: Bobby Knight (22nd season)
- Assistant coaches: Dan Dakich; Norm Ellenberger; Ron Felling
- Captains: Calbert Cheaney; Greg Graham; Matt Nover; Chris Reynolds
- Home arena: Assembly Hall

1992–93 Big Ten Conference men's basketball standings
	Conf.				Overall
Team	W		L	PCT	W		L	PCT
No. 1 Indiana	17	–	1	.944	31	–	4	.886
No. 13 Iowa	11	–	7	.611	23	–	9	.719
Illinois	11	–	7	.611	19	–	13	.594
Minnesota	9	–	9	.500	22	–	10	.688
No. 22 Purdue	9	–	9	.500	18	–	10	.643
Ohio State	8	–	10	.444	15	–	13	.536
Michigan State	7	–	11	.389	15	–	13	.536
Wisconsin	7	–	11	.389	14	–	14	.500
Northwestern	3	–	15	.167	8	–	19	.296
Penn State	2	–	16	.111	7	–	20	.259
No. 3 Michigan	0	–	3	.000	0	–	4	.000
Rankings from AP Poll; *Michigan vacated all games due to NCAA sanctions. Disputed record (15-3, 31-5)

The 1992–93 Indiana Hoosiers men's basketball team represented Indiana University. Their head coach was Bobby Knight, who was in his 22nd year. The team played its home games in Assembly Hall in Bloomington, Indiana, and was a member of the Big Ten Conference.

The Hoosiers finished the regular season with an overall record of 31–4 and a conference record of 17–1, finishing 1st in the Big Ten Conference. As the Big Ten Conference Champions, the Hoosiers were invited to participate in the 1993 NCAA tournament as a 1-seed, where they advanced to the Elite Eight for the second year in a row.

== Roster ==
No.	Name	Position	Ht.	Year	Hometown
11	Malcolm Sims	G	6–4	Fr.	Shaker Heights, Ohio
20	Greg Graham	G	6–4	Sr.	Indianapolis, Indiana
21	Chris Reynolds	G	6–1	Sr.	Peoria, Illinois
22	Damon Bailey	G	6–3	Jr.	Bedford, Indiana
24	Matt Nover	C	6–8	Sr.	Chesterton, Indiana
25	Pat Knight	G	6–6	So.	Bloomington, Indiana
30	Todd Leary	G	6–3	Jr.	Indianapolis, Indiana
33	Pat Graham	G	6–5	Jr.	Floyds Knobs, Indiana
34	Brian Evans	F	6–8	Fr.	Terre Haute, Indiana
40	Calbert Cheaney	F	6–7	Sr.	Evansville, Indiana
44	Alan Henderson	F	6–9	So.	Indianapolis, Indiana
50	Todd Lindeman	C	7–1	RS So.	Channing, Michigan

== Schedule/results ==
Date time, TV	Rank^{#}	Opponent^{#}	Result	Record	Site city, state
Regular season
11/18/1992*	No. 4	Murray State; Preseason NIT First Round	W 103–80	1–0	Assembly Hall; Bloomington, Indiana
11/20/1992*	No. 4	Tulane; Preseason NIT Second Round	W 102–92	2–0	Assembly Hall; Bloomington, Indiana
11/25/1992*	No. 4	vs. No. 7 Florida State; Preseason NIT Semifinals	W 81–78 ^{OT}	3–0	Madison Square Garden; New York City
11/27/1992*	No. 4	vs. No. 6 Seton Hall; Preseason NIT Championship	W 78–74	4–0	Madison Square Garden; New York City
12/5/1992*	No. 2	vs. No. 3 Kansas	L 69–74	4–1	Hoosier Dome; Indianapolis
12/8/1992*	No. 8	at Notre Dame	W 75–70	5–1	Joyce Center; Notre Dame, Indiana
12/11/1992*	No. 4	Austin Peay; Indiana Classic	W 107–61	6–1	Assembly Hall; Bloomington, Indiana
12/12/1992*	No. 4	Western Michigan; Indiana Classic	W 97–58	7–1	Assembly Hall; Bloomington, Indiana
12/19/1992*	No. 4	No. 19 Cincinnati	W 79–64	8–1	Assembly Hall; Bloomington, Indiana
12/23/1992*	No. 4	St. John's	W 105–80	9–1	Assembly Hall; Bloomington, Indiana
12/27/1992*	No. 4	vs. Butler; Union Federal Hoosier Classic	W 90–48	10–1	Market Square Arena; Indianapolis
12/28/1992*	No. 4	vs. Colorado; Union Federal Hoosier Classic	W 85–65	11–1	Market Square Arena; Indianapolis
1/3/1993*	No. 4	vs. No. 3 Kentucky; Indiana–Kentucky rivalry	L 78–81	11–2	Freedom Hall; Louisville, Kentucky
1/6/1993	No. 5	No. 8 Iowa	W 75–67	12–2 (1–0)	Assembly Hall; Bloomington, Indiana
1/9/1993	No. 5	Penn State	W 105–57	13–2 (2–0)	Assembly Hall; Bloomington, Indiana
1/12/1993	No. 6	at No. 2 Michigan	W 76–75	14–2 (3–0)	Crisler Arena; Ann Arbor, Michigan
1/16/1993	No. 6	at Illinois; Rivalry	W 83–79	15–2 (4–0)	Assembly Hall; Champaign, Illinois
1/19/1993	No. 2	at No. 13 Purdue; Rivalry	W 74–65	16–2 (5–0)	Mackey Arena; West Lafayette, Indiana
1/24/1993	No. 2	Ohio State	W 96–69	17–2 (6–0)	Assembly Hall; Bloomington, Indiana
1/27/1993	No. 2	Minnesota	W 61–57	18–2 (7–0)	Assembly Hall; Bloomington, Indiana
1/30/1993	No. 2	at Northwestern	W 93–71	19–2 (8–0)	Welsh-Ryan Arena; Evanston, Illinois
2/6/1993	No. 1	at No. 9 Iowa	W 73–66	20–2 (9–0)	Carver–Hawkeye Arena; Iowa City, Iowa
2/9/1993	No. 1	at Penn State	W 88–84 ^{2OT}	21–2 (10–0)	Rec Hall; University Park, Pennsylvania
2/14/1993	No. 1	No. 4 Michigan	W 93–92	22–2 (11–0)	Assembly Hall; Bloomington, Indiana
2/17/1993	No. 1	Illinois; Rivalry	W 93–71	23–2 (12–0)	Assembly Hall; Bloomington, Indiana
2/21/1993	No. 1	No. 14 Purdue; Rivalry	W 93–78	24–2 (13–0)	Assembly Hall; Bloomington, Indiana
2/23/1993	No. 1	at Ohio State	L 77–81	24–3 (13–1)	St. John Arena; Columbus, Ohio
2/27/1993	No. 1	at Minnesota	W 86–75	25–3 (14–1)	Williams Arena; Minneapolis
3/4/1993	No. 2	Northwestern	W 98–69	26–3 (15–1)	Assembly Hall; Bloomington, Indiana
3/10/1993	No. 2	Michigan State	W 99–68	27–3 (16–1)	Assembly Hall; Bloomington, Indiana
3/14/1993	No. 2	at Wisconsin	W 87–80	28–3 (17–1)	Wisconsin Field House; Madison, Wisconsin
NCAA tournament
3/19/1993*	(1 MW) No. 1	vs. (16 MW) Wright State; First Round	W 97–54	29–3	Hoosier Dome; Indianapolis
3/21/1993*	(1 MW) No. 1	vs. (9 MW) Xavier; Second Round	W 73–70	30–3	Hoosier Dome; Indianapolis
3/25/1993*	(1 MW) No. 1	vs. (4 MW) Louisville; Sweet Sixteen	W 82–69	31–3	St. Louis Arena; St. Louis
3/27/1993*	(1 MW) No. 1	vs. (2 MW) No. 9 Kansas; Elite Eight	L 77–83	31–4	St. Louis Arena; St. Louis
*Non-conference game. ^{#}Rankings from AP Poll. (#) Tournament seedings in parentheses. MW=MW.

== Awards and honors ==
- Calbert Cheaney, Chicago Tribune Silver Basketball
- Calbert Cheaney, Adolph Rupp Trophy
- Calbert Cheaney, Naismith College Player of the Year
- Calbert Cheaney, USBWA College Player of the Year
- Calbert Cheaney, John R. Wooden Award
- Calbert Cheaney, Associated Press College Basketball Player of the Year
- Calbert Cheaney, State Farm Division I Player of the Year Award

== Team players drafted into the NBA ==
Round	Pick	Player	NBA club
1	6	Calbert Cheaney	Washington Bullets
1	17	Greg Graham	Charlotte Hornets
