= 1992–93 Iowa Hawkeyes men's basketball team =

American college basketball season

1992–93 Iowa Hawkeyes men's basketball

Amana-Hawkeye Classic Champions San Juan Shootout Champions

NCAA men's Division I tournament, Round of 32
- Conference: Big Ten Conference

Ranking
- Coaches: No. 19
- AP: No. 13
- Record: 23–9 (11–7 Big Ten)
- Head coach: Tom Davis (7th season)
- Assistant coach: Gary Close
- MVP: Acie Earl
- Home arena: Carver-Hawkeye Arena (Capacity: 15,500)

1992–93 Big Ten Conference men's basketball standings
	Conf.				Overall
Team	W		L	PCT	W		L	PCT
No. 1 Indiana	17	–	1	.944	31	–	4	.886
No. 13 Iowa	11	–	7	.611	23	–	9	.719
Illinois	11	–	7	.611	19	–	13	.594
Minnesota	9	–	9	.500	22	–	10	.688
No. 22 Purdue	9	–	9	.500	18	–	10	.643
Ohio State	8	–	10	.444	15	–	13	.536
Michigan State	7	–	11	.389	15	–	13	.536
Wisconsin	7	–	11	.389	14	–	14	.500
Northwestern	3	–	15	.167	8	–	19	.296
Penn State	2	–	16	.111	7	–	20	.259
No. 3 Michigan	0	–	3	.000	0	–	4	.000
Rankings from AP Poll; *Michigan vacated all games due to NCAA sanctions. Disputed record (15-3, 31-5)

The 1992–93 Iowa Hawkeyes men's basketball team represented the University of Iowa as members of the Big Ten Conference. The team was led by seventh-year head coach Tom Davis and played their home games at Carver-Hawkeye Arena. They ended the season 23–9 overall and 11–7 in Big Ten play to finish tied for third place. The Hawkeyes received an at-large bid to the NCAA tournament as #4 seed in the Southeast Region. After defeating Northeast Louisiana 82–69 in the first round, the Hawkeyes lost to Wake Forest 84–78 in the Round of 32.

== Roster ==
1992–93 Iowa Hawkeyes men's basketball team
Players
Coaches

Pos.	#	Name	Height	Weight	Year	Hometown
G	3	Kenyon Murray	6 ft 5 in (1.96 m)	—	Fr	Battle Creek, Michigan
G	10	Kevin Smith	5 ft 11 in (1.8 m)	—	Jr	Fort Worth, Texas
G	11	Kevin Skillet	6 ft 3 in (1.91 m)	180 lb (82 kg)	So	Silvis, Illinois
G	13	Mon'ter Glasper	5 ft 11 in (1.8 m)	—	Fr	Albion, Michigan
G	20	Val Barnes	6 ft 2 in (1.88 m)	—	Sr	Wichita, Kansas
F	23	James Winters	6 ft 5 in (1.96 m)	—	Jr	Joliet, Illinois
F	44	Jim Bartels	6 ft 6 in (1.98 m)	—	Jr	Freedom, Wisconsin
F	34	Wade Lookingbill	6 ft 5 in (1.96 m)	—	Sr	Fort Dodge, Iowa
F	40	Chris Street	6 ft 8 in (2.03 m)	215 lb (98 kg)	Jr	Indianola, Iowa
F	42	Jay Webb	6 ft 8 in (2.03 m)	—	Sr	San Jose, California
F/C	52	Russ Millard	6 ft 8 in (2.03 m)	—	Fr	Cedar Rapids, Iowa
F/C	55	Acie Earl	6 ft 10 in (2.08 m)	225 lb (102 kg)	Sr	Moline, Illinois

Head coach

- Tom Davis (UW–Platteville)

Assistant coach(es)

- Gary Close

Legend

- (C) Team captain
- (S) Suspended
- (I) Ineligible
- (W) Walk-on
- Injured
- Current redshirt

== Schedule/results ==
Date time, TV	Rank^{#}	Opponent^{#}	Result	Record	Site city, state
Non-conference regular season
12/1/1992*	No. 10	Mississippi Valley State	W 100–69	1–0	Carver-Hawkeye Arena (14,810); Iowa City, IA
12/4/1992*	No. 10	Texas–Rio Grande Valley; Amana-Hawkeye Classic	W 85–29	2–0	Carver-Hawkeye Arena; Iowa City, IA
12/5/1992*	No. 10	Mississippi State; Amana-Hawkeye Classic	W 69–54	3–0	Carver-Hawkeye Arena; Iowa City, IA
12/8/1992*	No. 8	Northern Iowa; Iowa Big Four	W 64–44	4–0	Carver-Hawkeye Arena (15,213); Iowa City, IA
12/12/1992*	No. 8	Iowa State; Rivalry	W 78–51	5–0	Carver-Hawkeye Arena (15,500); Iowa City, IA
12/20/1992*	No. 8	vs. American-Puerto Rico; San Juan Shootout	W 101–47	6–0	San Juan, PR
12/21/1992*	No. 8	vs. Eastern Michigan; San Juan Shootout	W 103–66	7–0	San Juan, PR
12/22/1992*	No. 8	Southern Illinois; San Juan Shootout	W 90–70	8–0	San Juan, PR
12/28/1992*	No. 8	Texas Southern	W 91–70	9–0	Carver-Hawkeye Arena; Iowa City, IA
1/2/1993*	No. 8	Central Connecticut State	W 104–58	10–0	Carver-Hawkeye Arena; Iowa City, IA
1/4/1993*	No. 8	at Drake; Iowa Big Four	W 80–65	11–0	Knapp Center; Des Moines, IA
Big Ten Regular Season
1/6/1993	No. 8	at No. 5 Indiana	L 67–75	11–1 (0–1)	Assembly Hall; Bloomington, IN
1/9/1993	No. 8	at Ohio State	L 81–92	11–2 (0–2)	St. John Arena; Columbus, OH
1/13/1993	No. 13	No. 19 Minnesota	W 84–77	12–2 (1–2)	Carver-Hawkeye Arena; Iowa City, IA
1/16/1993	No. 13	at No. 3 Duke	L 56–65	12–3 (1–2)	Cameron Indoor Stadium; Durham, NC
1/28/1993	No. 11	at Michigan State	W 96–90	13–3 (2–2)	Breslin Center; East Lansing, MI
1/31/1993	No. 11	No. 5 Michigan	W 88–80	14–3 (3–2)	Carver-Hawkeye Arena (15,500); Iowa City, IA
2/4/1993	No. 9	at Illinois	L 77–78	14–4 (3–3)	Assembly Hall (14,985); Champaign, IL
2/6/1993	No. 9	No. 1 Indiana	L 66–73	14–5 (3–4)	Carver-Hawkeye Arena (15,500); Iowa City, IA
2/13/1993	No. 13	at Minnesota	L 85–91	14–6 (3–5)	Williams Arena; Minneapolis, MN
2/16/1993	No. 20	Ohio State	W 68–54	15–6 (4–5)	Carver-Hawkeye Arena (15,500); Iowa City, IA
2/20/1993	No. 20	at Northwestern	W 75–63	16–6 (5–5)	Welsh-Ryan Arena; Evanston, IL
2/22/1993	No. 18	at Penn State	W 74–58	17–6 (6–5)	Rec Hall; University Park, PA
2/24/1993	No. 18	Penn State	W 58–38	18–6 (7–5)	Carver-Hawkeye Arena; Iowa City, IA
2/27/1993	No. 18	Michigan State	W 66–64	19–6 (8–5)	Carver-Hawkeye Arena; Iowa City, IA
3/2/1993	No. 15	at No. 4 Michigan	L 73–82	19–7 (8–6)	Crisler Arena; Ann Arbor, MI
3/6/1993	No. 15	at No. 24 Purdue	L 58–69	19–8 (8–7)	Mackey Arena; West Lafayette, IN
3/8/1993	No. 17	Northwestern	W 56–50	20–8 (9–7)	Carver-Hawkeye Arena; Iowa City, IA
3/10/1993	No. 17	Wisconsin	W 91–65	21–8 (10–7)	Carver-Hawkeye Arena; Iowa City, IA
3/13/1993	No. 17	Illinois	W 63–53	22–8 (11–7)	Carver-Hawkeye Arena (15,500); Iowa City, IA
NCAA tournament
3/19/1993*; CBS	(4 SE) No. 13	vs. (13 SE) Northeast Louisiana; First Round	W 82–69	23–8	Memorial Gymnasium; Nashville, TN
3/21/1993*; CBS	(4 SE) No. 13	vs. (5 SE) No. 16 Wake Forest; Second Round	L 78–84	23–9	Memorial Gymnasium; Nashville, TN
*Non-conference game. ^{#}Rankings from AP Poll. (#) Tournament seedings in parentheses. SE=Southeast.

== Rankings ==
Ranking movements Legend: ██ Increase in ranking ██ Decrease in ranking
	Week																		
Poll	Pre	1	2	3	4	5	6	7	8	9	10	11	12	13	14	15	16	17	Final
AP	11	11	10	8	8	8	8	8	13	14	11	9	13	20	18	15	17	13	Not released
Coaches	13	13^	14	10	8	8	8	8	13	13	11	8	9	16	16	15	17	13	19

^Coaches did not release a Week 1 poll.
*AP does not release post-NCAA Tournament rankings

== Team players in the 1993 NBA draft ==
Round	Pick	Player	NBA club
1	19	Acie Earl	Boston Celtics
