= 1992–93 Purdue Boilermakers men's basketball team =

American college basketball season

1992–93 Purdue Boilermakers men's basketball

NCAA tournament, first round
- Conference: Big Ten Conference

Ranking
- AP: No. 22
- Record: 18–10 (9–9 Big Ten)
- Head coach: Gene Keady (10th season)
- Assistant coaches: Bruce Weber (10th season); Tom Reiter (4th season); Steve Lavin (2nd season)
- Home arena: Mackey Arena

1992–93 Big Ten Conference men's basketball standings
	Conf.				Overall
Team	W		L	PCT	W		L	PCT
No. 1 Indiana	17	–	1	.944	31	–	4	.886
No. 13 Iowa	11	–	7	.611	23	–	9	.719
Illinois	11	–	7	.611	19	–	13	.594
Minnesota	9	–	9	.500	22	–	10	.688
No. 22 Purdue	9	–	9	.500	18	–	10	.643
Ohio State	8	–	10	.444	15	–	13	.536
Michigan State	7	–	11	.389	15	–	13	.536
Wisconsin	7	–	11	.389	14	–	14	.500
Northwestern	3	–	15	.167	8	–	19	.296
Penn State	2	–	16	.111	7	–	20	.259
No. 3 Michigan	0	–	3	.000	0	–	4	.000
Rankings from AP Poll; *Michigan vacated all games due to NCAA sanctions. Disputed record (15-3, 31-5)

The 1992–93 Purdue Boilermakers men's basketball team represented Purdue University during the 1992–93 college basketball season. Led by head coach Gene Keady, the Boilermakers were selected as the No. 9 seed in the Southeast Region of the NCAA tournament, but were defeated in the first round by Rhode Island, finishing the season with a 18–10 record (9–9 Big Ten).

== Roster ==
1992–93 Purdue Boilermakers men's basketball team
Players
Coaches

Pos.	#	Name	Height	Weight	Year	Hometown
G	11	Matt Waddell	6 ft 4 in (1.93 m)	—	So
G	12	Matt Painter	6 ft 6 in (1.98 m)	—	Sr	Delta	Muncie, Indiana
F	13	Glenn Robinson	6 ft 7 in (2.01 m)	—	So	Roosevelt	Gary, Indiana
F	21	Herb Dove	6 ft 5 in (1.96 m)	—	Fr
F	22	Cuonzo Martin	6 ft 5 in (1.96 m)	—	So	East St. Louis	East St. Louis, Illinois
G	30	Linc Darner	6 ft 4 in (1.93 m)	—	Jr	Highland
G		Porter Roberts	6 ft 3 in (1.91 m)	—	Fr
F		Brandon Brantley	6 ft 8 in (2.03 m)	—	Fr
F		Ian Stanback	6 ft 7 in (2.01 m)	—	Jr
F		Justin Jennings	6 ft 6 in (1.98 m)	—	Fr
G		Todd Foster	6 ft 1 in (1.85 m)	—	Fr
C		Cornelius McNary	6 ft 9 in (2.06 m)	—	Jr
C		Kenny Williams	6 ft 9 in (2.06 m)	—	Jr
G		Tim Spiker	6 ft 0 in (1.83 m)	—	So

Head coach

- Gene Keady (Kansas State)

Assistant coach(es)

- Bruce Weber (Milwaukee)
- Tom Reiter (Wisconsin)
- Steve Lavin

Legend

- (C) Team captain
- (S) Suspended
- (I) Ineligible
- (W) Walk-on
- Injured
- Current redshirt

== Schedule and results ==
Date time, TV	Rank^{#}	Opponent^{#}	Result	Record	Site city, state
Non-conference regular season
Nov 28, 1992*; ESPN		vs. No. 16 Connecticut; Hall of Fame Tip-Off Classic	W 73–69	1–0	Springfield Civic Center (8,999); Springfield, Massachusetts
Dec 4, 1992*	No. 24	Weber State	W 85–64	2–0	Mackey Arena; West Lafayette, Indiana
Dec 5, 1992*	No. 24	East Tennessee State	W 88–74	3–0	Mackey Arena; West Lafayette, Indiana
Dec 12, 1992*	No. 18	Loyola–Chicago	W 84–70	4–0	Mackey Arena; West Lafayette, Indiana
Dec 19, 1992*	No. 16	Indiana State	W 92–63	5–0	Mackey Arena; West Lafayette, Indiana
Dec 22, 1992*	No. 15	at SW Missouri State	W 48–45	6–0	Hammons Student Center; Springfield, Missouri
Dec 28, 1992*	No. 13	vs. Florida; Sun Bowl Invitational semifinals	W 67–63	7–0	Don Haskins Center; El Paso, Texas
Dec 29, 1992*	No. 13	at UTEP; Sun Bowl Invitational championship	W 63–61	8–0	Don Haskins Center; El Paso, Texas
Jan 2, 1993*	No. 13	Butler	W 80–54	9–0	Mackey Arena; West Lafayette, Indiana
Big Ten Regular Season
Jan 7, 1993	No. 9	No. 3 Michigan	L 70–80	9–1 (0–1)	Mackey Arena; West Lafayette, Indiana
Jan 9, 1993	No. 9	at Minnesota	L 60–81	9–2 (0–2)	Williams Arena; Minneapolis, Minnesota
Jan 13, 1993	No. 17	Wisconsin	W 76–60	10–2 (1–2)	Mackey Arena; West Lafayette, Indiana
Jan 16, 1993	No. 17	at Penn State	W 61–54	11–2 (2–2)	Rec Hall; University Park, Pennsylvania
Jan 19, 1993	No. 13	No. 2 Indiana	L 79–83	11–3 (2–3)	Mackey Arena; West Lafayette, Indiana
Jan 28, 1993	No. 14	at Northwestern	W 83–73	12–3 (3–3)	Welsh-Ryan Arena; Evanston, Illinois
Jan 30, 1993	No. 14	Michigan State	L 64–72	12–4 (3–4)	Mackey Arena; West Lafayette, Indiana
Feb 3, 1993	No. 19	at Ohio State	W 62–57	13–4 (4–4)	St. John Arena; Columbus, Ohio
Feb 7, 1993	No. 19	at No. 7 Michigan	L 76–84	13–5 (4–5)	Crisler Arena; Ann Arbor, Michigan
Feb 10, 1993	No. 18	Minnesota	W 75–69	14–5 (5–5)	Mackey Arena; West Lafayette, Indiana
Feb 13, 1993	No. 18	at Wisconsin	W 90–87	15–5 (6–5)	Wisconsin Field House; Madison, Wisconsin
Feb 21, 1993	No. 14	at No. 1 Indiana	L 78–93	15–6 (6–6)	Assembly Hall; Bloomington, Indiana
Feb 25, 1993	No. 17	at Illinois	L 70–78	15–7 (6–7)	Assembly Hall; Champaign, Illinois
Feb 27, 1993	No. 17	Northwestern	L 59–62	15–8 (6–8)	Mackey Arena; West Lafayette, Indiana
Mar 3, 1993	No. 24	at Michigan State	W 61–58	16–8 (7–8)	Breslin Student Events Center; East Lansing, Michigan
Mar 6, 1993	No. 24	No. 15 Iowa	W 69–58	17–8 (8–8)	Mackey Arena; West Lafayette, Indiana
Mar 11, 1993	No. 18	Penn State	W 57–49	18–8 (9–8)	Mackey Arena; West Lafayette, Indiana
Mar 14, 1993	No. 18	Ohio State	L 62–72	18–9 (9–9)	Mackey Arena; West Lafayette, Indiana
NCAA Tournament
Mar 18, 1993*	(9 SE) No. 22	vs. (8 SE) Rhode Island; First Round	L 68–74	18–10	Lawrence Joel Coliseum; Winston-Salem, North Carolina
*Non-conference game. ^{#}Rankings from AP Poll. (#) Tournament seedings in parentheses. E=East.
