= 1992–93 Michigan Wolverines men's basketball team =

American college basketball season

1992–93 Michigan Wolverines men's basketball

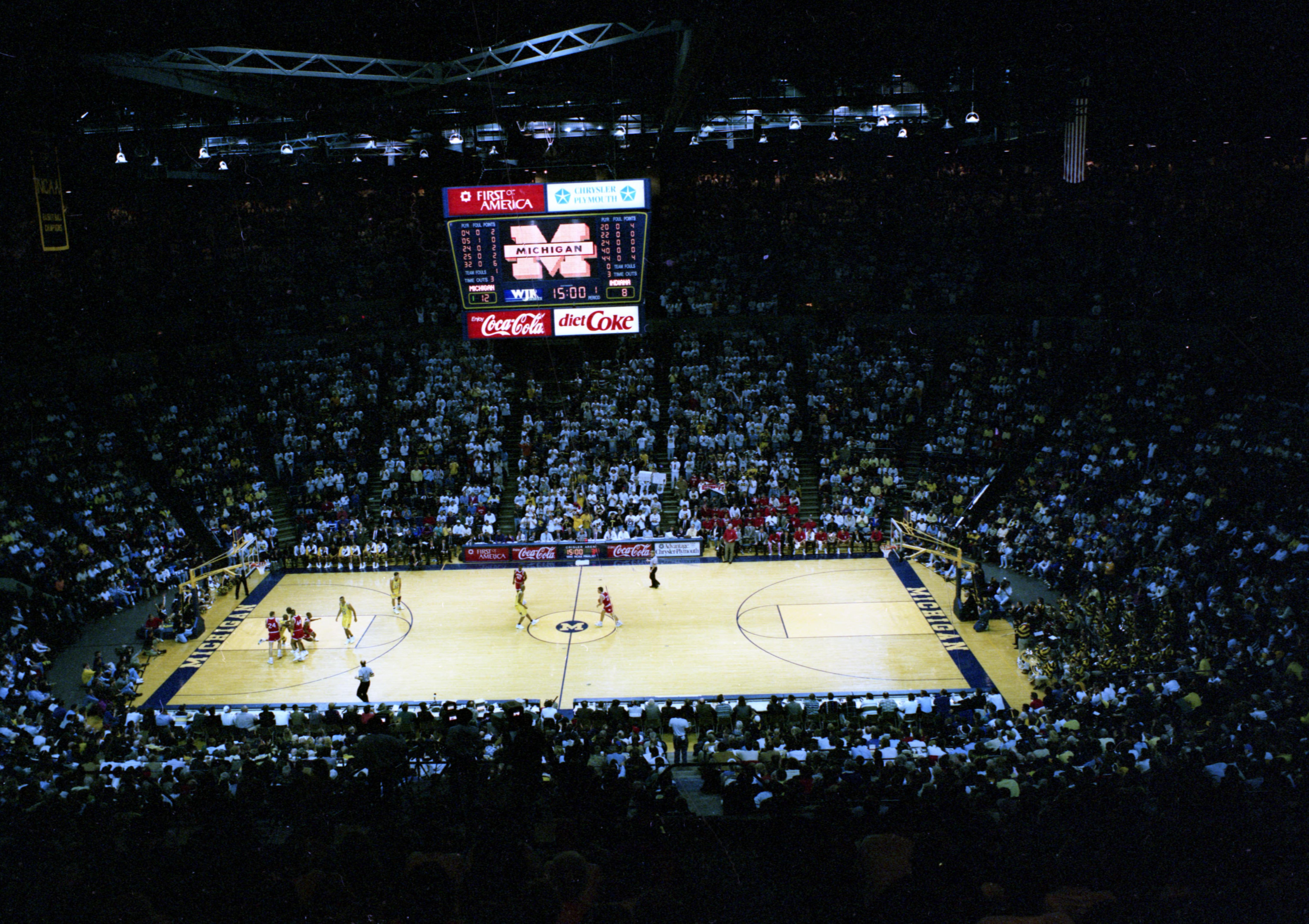

NCAA tournament, Runner-up (vacated)

National Championship Game, L 71–77 vs. North Carolina (vacated)
- Conference: Big Ten Conference

Ranking
- Coaches: No. 2
- AP: No. 3
- Record: 0–4 (31–5 unadjusted) (0–3 (15-3 unadjusted) Big Ten)
- Head coach: Steve Fisher
- Assistant coaches: Brian Dutcher; Jay Smith; Perry Watson
- MVP: Chris Webber
- Captain: Rotating
- Home arena: Crisler Arena

1992–93 Big Ten Conference men's basketball standings
	Conf.				Overall
Team	W		L	PCT	W		L	PCT
No. 1 Indiana	17	–	1	.944	31	–	4	.886
No. 13 Iowa	11	–	7	.611	23	–	9	.719
Illinois	11	–	7	.611	19	–	13	.594
Minnesota	9	–	9	.500	22	–	10	.688
No. 22 Purdue	9	–	9	.500	18	–	10	.643
Ohio State	8	–	10	.444	15	–	13	.536
Michigan State	7	–	11	.389	15	–	13	.536
Wisconsin	7	–	11	.389	14	–	14	.500
Northwestern	3	–	15	.167	8	–	19	.296
Penn State	2	–	16	.111	7	–	20	.259
No. 3 Michigan	0	–	3	.000	0	–	4	.000
Rankings from AP Poll; *Michigan vacated all games due to NCAA sanctions. Disputed record (15-3, 31-5)

The 1992–93 Michigan Wolverines men's basketball team represented the University of Michigan in intercollegiate college basketball during the 1992–93 season. The team played its home games in the Crisler Arena in Ann Arbor, Michigan, and was a member of the Big Ten Conference.

Under the direction of head coach Steve Fisher, the team finished second in the Big Ten Conference. Although the team compiled a 31–5 record during the season, the NCAA has adjusted the team's record to 0–4 due to Chris Webber being ruled ineligible as a result of the investigation in the University of Michigan basketball scandal. The team earned an invitation to the 1993 NCAA Division I men's basketball tournament where it was national runner up. The team was ranked for the entire eighteen weeks of Associated Press Top Twenty-Five Poll, starting the season ranked first, holding the number one position for three weeks and ending ranked third, and it ended the season ranked fourth in the final USA Today/CNN Poll. The team had an 8–5 record against ranked opponents, including the following victories: December 28, 1992, against #20 Nebraska 88–73 in the Rainbow Classic at the Blaisdell Center, December 29 against #5 North Carolina 79–78 in the Rainbow Classic, December 30 against #2 Kansas 86–74 in the Rainbow Classic, January 7, 1993, against #9 Purdue 80–70 at Mackey Arena, February 2 against #25 Michigan State 73–69 at the Breslin Student Events Center, February 7 against #19 Purdue 84–76 at Crisler Arena, March 2 against #15 Iowa 82–73 at Crisler Arena, April 2 against #2 Kentucky 81–78 (OT) at the Superdome in the 1993 NCAA Division I men's basketball tournament.

The team had rotating captains on a game-by-game basis, and Chris Webber earned team MVP. The team's leading scorers were Chris Webber (690 points), Jalen Rose (555 points), and Juwan Howard (524 points). The leading rebounders were Webber (362), Howard (267), and Eric Riley (169).

During the season the team set a Big Ten Conference record for single-season blocked shots (193) that would last until 2000.

During the season, the team won the Big Ten Conference statistical championships in rebounding and rebounding margin with at 40.9 average and 7.6 average margin in conference games, respectively. The record-setting team also led the conference in average blocked shots (5.0). Chris Webber led the Big Ten in rebounds with a 9.7 average in 18 conference games and 10.1 average in 36 overall games.

The team surpassed the 30-win total by the 1989 team with 31 victories and was the winningest team in school history, until being matched by Michigan's 2012–13 team and later being surpassed by its 2017–18 team.

For the second year in a row, the team set the school record for single-season team blocks with 193 in 36 games, surpassing the 182 in 34 games set the prior year. The record would stand until 2007.

Four players surpassed Jalen Rose's single-season minutes played record set the prior season. Rose set the new and current single-season record of 1234. King played 1174 minutes, while Webber and Howard contributed 1138 and 1135, respectively.

== Regular season ==
Michigan returned its top nine scorers and began the season ranked number one in the country by the Associated Press. Michigan lost its second game of the season in a rematch with Duke.

== Schedule ==
Date time, TV	Rank^{#}	Opponent^{#}	Result	Record	High points	High rebounds	High assists	Site (attendance) city, state
Non-conference Regular season
December 1, 1992*	No. 1	at Rice	W 75–71	1–0	20 – Webber	19 – Webber	4 – Rose	The Summit (9,353); Houston, TX
December 5, 1992*; 9:00 pm	No. 1	at No. 4 Duke; Rivalry	L 68–79	1–1	20 – King	11 – Webber	6 – Webber	Cameron Indoor Stadium (9,314); Durham, NC
December 7, 1992*	No. 6	Detroit	W 92–77	2–1	–	–	–	Crisler Arena; Ann Arbor, MI
December 9, 1992*	No. 6	Bowling Green	W 79–68	3–1	–	–	–	Crisler Arena; Ann Arbor, MI
December 14, 1992*	No. 6	Cleveland State	W 88–56	4–1	–	–	–	Crisler Arena; Ann Arbor, MI
December 19, 1992*; 8:00 pm, ESPN	No. 6	vs. Iowa State	W 94–72	5–1	–	–	–	Palace of Auburn Hills (18,103); Detroit, MI
December 21, 1992*	No. 6	Central Michigan	W 94–69	6–1	–	–	–	Crisler Arena; Ann Arbor, MI
December 28, 1992*	No. 6	vs. No. 20 Nebraska; Rainbow Classic	W 88–73	7–1	20 – Webber	12 – Webber	5 – Rose	Blaisdell Center (7,575); Honolulu, HI
December 29, 1992*	No. 6	vs. No. 5 North Carolina; Rainbow Classic	W 79–78	8–1	27 – Webber	8 – Webber	6 – King	Blaisdell Center (7,575); Honolulu, HI
December 30, 1992*	No. 6	vs. No. 2 Kansas; Rainbow Classic	W 86–74	9–1	25 – Rose	11 – Webber	6 – Rose	Blaisdell Center (7,635); Honolulu, HI
January 2, 1993*	No. 6	Eastern Michigan	W 88–58	10–1	–	–	–	Crisler Arena; Ann Arbor, MI
Big Ten Regular season
January 7, 1993	No. 3	at No. 9 Purdue	W 80–70	11–1 (1–0)	–	–	–	Mackey Arena; West Lafayette, IN
January 9, 1993	No. 3	at Wisconsin	W 98–73	12–1 (2–0)	–	–	–	Wisconsin Field House; Madison, WI
January 12, 1993	No. 2	No. 6 Indiana	L 75–76	12–2 (2–1)	–	–	–	Crisler Arena; Ann Arbor, MI
January 16, 1993*	No. 2	Notre Dame	W 70–55	13–2	–	–	–	Crisler Arena; Ann Arbor, MI
January 20, 1993	No. 5	at Minnesota	W 80–73	14–2 (3–1)	–	–	–	Williams Arena; Minneapolis, MN
January 23, 1993	No. 5	Illinois	W 76–68	15–2 (4–1)	–	–	–	Crisler Arena (13,562); Ann Arbor, MI
January 26, 1993	No. 5	Ohio State; Rivalry	W 72–62	16–2 (5–1)	–	–	–	Crisler Arena; Ann Arbor, MI
January 31, 1993	No. 5	at No. 11 Iowa	L 80–88	16–3 (5–2)	–	–	–	Carver–Hawkeye Arena; Iowa City, IA
February 2, 1993	No. 7	at No. 25 Michigan State; Rivalry	W 73–69	17–3 (6–2)	–	–	–	Breslin Center; East Lansing, MI
February 7, 1993	No. 7	No. 19 Purdue	W 84–76	18–3 (7–2)	–	–	–	Crisler Arena; Ann Arbor, MI
February 10, 1993	No. 4	Wisconsin	W 85–66	19–3 (8–2)	–	–	–	Crisler Arena; Ann Arbor, MI
February 14, 1993	No. 4	at No. 1 Indiana	L 92–93	19–4 (8–3)	–	–	–	Assembly Hall; Bloomington, IN
February 17, 1993	No. 5	at Penn State	W 80–70	20–4 (9–3)	–	–	–	Rec Hall; University Park, PA
February 20, 1993	No. 5	Minnesota	W 84–69	21–4 (10–3)	–	–	–	Crisler Arena; Ann Arbor, MI
February 28, 1993	No. 5	at Ohio State; Rivalry	W 66–64	22–4 (11–3)	–	–	–	St. John Arena; Columbus, OH
March 2, 1993	No. 4	No. 15 Iowa	W 82–73	23–4 (12–3)	–	–	–	Crisler Arena; Ann Arbor, MI
March 7, 1993	No. 4	Michigan State; Rivalry	W 87–81 ^{OT}	24–4 (13–3)	–	–	–	Crisler Arena; Ann Arbor, MI
March 10, 1993	No. 3	at Illinois	W 98–97 ^{OT}	25–4 (14–3)	23 – Rose	–	–	Assembly Hall (16,321); Champaign, IL
March 13, 1993	No. 3	Northwestern	W 86–60	26–4 (15–3)	–	–	–	Crisler Arena (13,562); Ann Arbor, MI
NCAA Tournament
March 19, 1993*	(1 W) No. 3	vs. (16 W) Coastal Carolina; First Round	W 84–53	27–4	19 – Jackson	10 – Howard	4 – Tied	McKale Center (13,532); Tucson, AZ
March 21, 1993*	(1 W) No. 3	vs. (9 W) UCLA; Second Round	W 86–84 ^{OT}	28–4	27 – Webber	14 – Webber	8 – Rose	McKale Center (13,534); Tucson, AZ
March 26, 1993*	(1 W) No. 3	vs. (12 W) George Washington; Sweet Sixteen	W 72–64	29–4	17 – Howard	10 – Howard	6 – Rose	Kingdome (24,021); Seattle, WA
March 28, 1993*	(1 W) No. 3	vs. (7 W) Temple; Elite Eight	W 77–72	30–4	17 – Rose	12 – Webber	3 – Webber	Kingdome (24,196); Seattle, WA
April 3, 1993*	(1 W) No. 3	vs. (1 SE) No. 2 Kentucky; Final Four	W 81–78 ^{OT}	31–4	27 – Webber	13 – Webber	3 – Tied	Louisiana Superdome (64,151); New Orleans, LA
April 5, 1993*; CBS	(1 W) No. 3	vs. (1 E) No. 4 North Carolina; National Championship	L 71–77	31–5	23 – Webber	11 – Webber	4 – Tied	Louisiana Superdome (64,151); New Orleans, LA
*Non-conference game. ^{#}Rankings from AP Poll. (#) Tournament seedings in parentheses. W=West. All times are in Eastern Time.

== NCAA tournament ==
Michigan was given the #1 seed in that year's West Regional and played their first and second-round games at the McKale Center in Tucson. They defeated Coastal Carolina in their first game and then were taken to overtime by #9 seed UCLA before escaping with a victory.

The Wolverines moved on to the Kingdome for the regionals. The sub-regional had been littered with upsets, as the #12, #13, and #15 seeds had all won in the first round. Michigan drew #12 seeded George Washington and won, then faced Temple for the second consecutive year (having defeated them as a #6 seed the year before) and beating them 77–72 to join Kentucky, Kansas, and North Carolina in the Final Four in New Orleans. In their national semifinal at the Superdome on April 3, the team defeated Southeast Regional winner Kentucky 81–78 in overtime.

In the championship game at the Superdome on April 5, the Wolverines lost to East Regional winner North Carolina 77–71. Michigan's final possession of the game went down as one of the most memorable moments in college basketball history. With twenty seconds to go and Michigan trailing by two and out of timeouts, Chris Webber rebounded a missed free throw. Confused as to what to do next, Webber thought about passing to Jalen Rose but did not and took a step without dribbling the basketball. The officials did not see the travel, however, and Webber headed upcourt where North Carolina was set up in a half court trap defense. Webber ran directly into the trap and was double teamed in the corner. He could not break the double team to pass the ball, and called for a timeout that the Wolverines did not have. By rule, Michigan was given a technical foul for calling the extra timeout and North Carolina was given two free throws and possession of the ball. North Carolina made their free throws, then added two more when Michigan was forced to foul again after the change in possession.

The team established numerous NCAA records for three-point field goals in the final four: fewest single-game three-point field goals made in a final four (0 vs. Kentucky on April 3, 1993, in an overtime) and fewest single-game three-point field goals attempted (4 vs. Kentucky). The 0 three-point field goals made surpassed the team's previous record of 1 made against Duke the year before in the 1992 NCAA Division I men's basketball tournament.

== Later developments ==
In 2002, the Wolverines vacated their entire 1992–93 season, including their tournament appearance, in the wake of a major scandal involving many years of improper payments from a major booster to several former players, among them Webber.

== Statistics ==
The team posted the following statistics:

Name	GP	GS	Min	Avg	FG	FGA	FG%	3FG	3FGA	3FG%	FT	FTA	FT%	OR	DR	RB	Avg	Ast	Avg	PF	DQ	TO	Stl	Blk	Pts	Avg
Chris Webber*	36	36	1138	31.6	281	454	0.619	27	80	0.338	101	183	0.552	155	207	362	10.1	90	2.5	102	4	105	49	90	690	19.2
Jalen Rose	36	36	1234	34.3	203	455	0.446	33	103	0.320	116	161	0.721	37	113	150	4.2	140	3.9	82	1	113	43	15	555	15.4
Juwan Howard	36	36	1135	31.5	206	407	0.506	0	2	0.000	112	160	0.700	94	173	267	7.4	69	1.9	99	3	92	21	14	524	14.6
Jimmy King	36	36	1174	32.6	148	291	0.509	37	92	0.402	57	88	0.648	58	101	159	4.4	110	3.1	75	2	84	57	19	390	10.8
Ray Jackson	29	26	657	22.7	105	213	0.493	2	13	0.154	50	79	0.633	46	72	118	4.1	67	2.3	78	3	53	27	10	262	9.0
Eric Riley	35	0	528	15.1	78	133	0.586	0	1	0.000	39	53	0.736	63	106	169	4.8	14	0.4	82	2	37	15	31	195	5.6
Rob Pelinka	36	4	571	15.9	50	120	0.417	24	60	0.400	32	42	0.762	37	39	76	2.1	35	1.0	49	0	17	6	1	156	4.3
James Voskuil	33	6	390	11.8	33	94	0.351	23	48	0.479	13	20	0.650	13	47	60	1.8	17	0.5	49	0	25	8	6	102	3.1
Michael Talley	29	0	249	8.6	15	55	0.273	4	16	0.250	3	5	0.600	5	11	16	0.6	32	1.1	24	0	19	7	0	37	1.3
Jason Bossard	10	0	25	2.5	7	19	0.368	1	10	0.100	0	3	0.000	3	0	3	0.3	0	0.0	3	0	3	0	0	15	1.5
Leon Derricks	14	0	62	4.4	4	14	0.286	0	1	0.000	3	7	0.429	5	13	18	1.3	3	0.2	10	0	4	2	5	11	0.8
Dugan Fife	20	0	122	6.1	0	9	0.000	0	4	0.000	10	17	0.588	6	11	17	0.9	13	0.7	13	0	11	7	0	10	0.5
Sean Dobbins	10	0	12	1.2	1	3	0.333	0	0		1	4	0.250	1	1	2	0.2	0	0.0	4	0	0	0	0	3	0.3
Ricky Guzman	3	0	3	1.0	0	1	0.000	0	1	0.000	0	0		0	0	0	0.0	0	0.0	1	0	1	0	0	0	0.0
TEAM	36													43	34	77	2.1									
Season Total	36				1131	2268	0.499	151	431	0.350	537	822	0.653	566	928	1494	41.5	590	16.4	671	15	564	242	191	2950	81.9
Opponents	36				943	2275	0.415	202	578	0.349	498	720	0.692	518	693	1211	33.6	462	12.8	720	22	529	226	98	2586	71.8

* Denotes players whose individual records, awards and other honors have been vacated due to NCAA and U-M sanctions

== Rankings ==
Ranking movements Legend: ██ Increase in ranking ██ Decrease in ranking
	Week																		
Poll	Pre	1	2	3	4	5	6	7	8	9	10	11	12	13	14	15	16	17	Final
AP Poll	1	1	1	6	6	6	6	3	2	5	5	7	4	5	5	4	3	3	Not released
Coaches' Poll	1		1	2	5	6	6	6	3	3	5	5	9	4	5	5	5	3	2

== Awards and honors ==
- Chris Webber, All-America selection (vacated as a result of the scandal)
- Rob Pelinka, Walter Byers Scholar (top male scholar-athlete in all NCAA sports; not vacated)

== Team players drafted into the NBA ==
Five players from this team were selected in the NBA draft.

Year	Round	Pick	Overall	Player	NBA Club
1993	1	1	1	Chris Webber	Orlando Magic
1993	2	6	33	Eric Riley	Dallas Mavericks
1994	1	5	5	Juwan Howard	Washington Bullets
1994	1	13	13	Jalen Rose	Denver Nuggets
1995	2	6	35	Jimmy King	Toronto Raptors

== See also ==
- 1993 NCAA Division I men's basketball tournament
- List of vacated and forfeited games in college basketball
- University of Michigan basketball scandal
