= 1992–93 Wisconsin Badgers men's basketball team =

American college basketball season

1992–93 Wisconsin Badgers men's basketball

NIT, First Round
- Conference: Big Ten Conference
- Record: 14–14 (7–11 Big Ten)
- Head coach: Stu Jackson
- Home arena: UW Fieldhouse

1992–93 Big Ten Conference men's basketball standings
	Conf.				Overall
Team	W		L	PCT	W		L	PCT
No. 1 Indiana	17	–	1	.944	31	–	4	.886
No. 13 Iowa	11	–	7	.611	23	–	9	.719
Illinois	11	–	7	.611	19	–	13	.594
Minnesota	9	–	9	.500	22	–	10	.688
No. 22 Purdue	9	–	9	.500	18	–	10	.643
Ohio State	8	–	10	.444	15	–	13	.536
Michigan State	7	–	11	.389	15	–	13	.536
Wisconsin	7	–	11	.389	14	–	14	.500
Northwestern	3	–	15	.167	8	–	19	.296
Penn State	2	–	16	.111	7	–	20	.259
No. 3 Michigan	0	–	3	.000	0	–	4	.000
Rankings from AP Poll; *Michigan vacated all games due to NCAA sanctions. Disputed record (15-3, 31-5)

The 1992–93 Wisconsin Badgers men's basketball team represented University of Wisconsin–Madison. The head coach was Stu Jackson, coaching his 1st season with the Badgers. The team played their home games at the UW Fieldhouse in Madison, Wisconsin and was a member of the Big Ten Conference.

== Roster ==
1992–93 Wisconsin Badgers men's basketball team
Players
Coaches

Pos.	#	Name	Height	Weight	Year	Hometown
G	3	Jason Johnsen	6 ft 3 in (1.91 m)	190 lb (86 kg)	RS Jr	New Hope, MN
F	4	Brian Kelley	6 ft 7 in (2.01 m)	240 lb (109 kg)	So	Decatur, GA
G	11	Tracy Webster	6 ft 0 in (1.83 m)	185 lb (84 kg)	Jr	Harvey, IL
G	12	Chris Conger (W)	6 ft 3 in (1.91 m)	180 lb (82 kg)	RS So	Green Bay, WI
G	15	Andy Kilbride	6 ft 3 in (1.91 m)	185 lb (84 kg)	So	Kankakee, IL
F	22	Otto McDuffie	6 ft 5 in (1.96 m)	200 lb (91 kg)	Fr	Milwaukee, WI
F	24	Michael Finley	6 ft 6 in (1.98 m)	205 lb (93 kg)	So	Maywood, IL
F	32	Carlton McGee	6 ft 7 in (2.01 m)	202 lb (92 kg)	RS Jr	Milwaukee, Wisconsin
F	33	Louis Ely	6 ft 7 in (2.01 m)	192 lb (87 kg)	Sr	Harvey, Illinois
F	34	Howard Moore	6 ft 6 in (1.98 m)	200 lb (91 kg)	So	Chicago, IL
F	41	Damon Harrell	6 ft 9 in (2.06 m)	215 lb (98 kg)	Sr	Madison, Wisconsin
F/C	43	Jeff Petersen	6 ft 10 in (2.08 m)	225 lb (102 kg)	Jr	Mequon, WI
C	52	Grant Johnson	7 ft 0 in (2.13 m)	236 lb (107 kg)	RS Jr	Plymouth, Minnesota
C	55	Greg Timmerman	6 ft 9 in (2.06 m)	220 lb (100 kg)	Fr	Dickeyville, WI
G		Adam Carl	5 ft 11 in (1.8 m)	165 lb (75 kg)	Jr	Northbrook, IL

Head coach

- Stu Jackson

Assistant coach(es)

Legend

- (C) Team captain
- (S) Suspended
- (I) Ineligible
- (W) Walk-on
- Injured
- Current redshirt

== Schedule ==
Date time, TV	Rank^{#}	Opponent^{#}	Result	Record	Site city, state
Regular Season
12/1/1992*		at Loyola (IL)	L 66–68	0–1	Alumni Gym; Chicago, IL
12/5/1992*		UW-Green Bay	W 70–65	1–1	UW Fieldhouse; Madison, WI
12/8/1992*		Bethune–Cookman	W 75–50	2–1	UW Fieldhouse; Madison, WI
12/12/1992*		UW-Milwaukee	L 72–77	2–2	UW Fieldhouse; Madison, WI
12/14/1992*		Charleston Southern	W 101–72	3–2	UW Fieldhouse; Madison, WI
12/23/1992*		Detroit Mercy	W 108–86	4–2	UW Fieldhouse; Madison, WI
12/29/1992*		Alcorn State	W 110–81	5–2	UW Fieldhouse; Madison, WI
12/31/1992*		Fairfield	W 76–55	6–2	UW Fieldhouse; Madison, WI
1/2/1993*		at Marquette	W 77–67	7–2	Bradley Center; Milwaukee, WI
1/9/1993		No. 3 Michigan	L 73–98	7–3 (0–1)	UW Fieldhouse; Madison, WI
1/13/1993		at No. 17 Purdue	L 60–76	7–4 (0–2)	Mackey Arena; West Lafayette, IN
1/16/1993		No. 19 Minnesota	W 79–70	8–4 (1–2)	UW Fieldhouse; Madison, WI
1/20/1993		No. 24 Ohio State	W 76–67	9–4 (2–2)	UW Fieldhouse; Madison, WI
1/23/1993		at No. 21 Michigan State	W 67–66	10–4 (3–2)	Breslin Center; East Lansing, MI
1/27/1993		at Illinois	L 72–80	10–5 (3–3)	Assembly Hall; Champaign, IL
1/30/1993		at Penn State	W 75–68	11–5 (4–3)	Rec Hall; University Park, PA
2/3/1993		Northwestern	W 101–87	12–5 (5–3)	UW Fieldhouse; Madison, WI
2/10/1993		at No. 4 Michigan	L 66–85	12–6 (5–4)	Crisler Arena; Ann Arbor, MI
2/13/1993		No. 18 Purdue	L 87–90 ^{2OT}	12–7 (5–5)	UW Fieldhouse; Madison, WI
2/18/1993		at Minnesota	L 71–85	12–8 (5–6)	Williams Arena; Minneapolis, MN
2/20/1993		at Ohio State	L 70–80	12–9 (5–7)	St. John Arena; Columbus, OH
2/24/1993		Michigan State	W 65–62	13–9 (6–7)	UW Fieldhouse; Madison, WI
2/28/1993		Illinois	W 74–66	14–9 (7–7)	UW Fieldhouse; Madison, WI
3/3/1993		Penn State	L 58–62	14–10 (7–8)	UW Fieldhouse; Madison, WI
3/6/1993		at Northwestern	L 89–100	14–11 (7–9)	Welsh–Ryan Arena; Evanston, IL
3/10/1993		at No. 17 Iowa	L 65–91	14–12 (7–10)	Carver–Hawkeye Arena; Iowa City, IA
3/14/1993		No. 2 Indiana	L 80–87	14–13 (7–11)	UW Fieldhouse; Madison, WI
National Invitation Tournament
3/17/1993*		Rice; First Round	L 73–77	14–14	UW Fieldhouse; Madison, WI
*Non-conference game. ^{#}Rankings from AP Poll. (#) Tournament seedings in parentheses.
