= 1992–93 Minnesota Golden Gophers men's basketball team =

American college basketball season

1992–93 Minnesota Golden Gophers men's basketball

1993 National Invitation Tournament, Champions
- Conference: Big Ten Conference

Ranking
- Coaches: No. 25
- Record: 22–10 (9–9 Big Ten)
- Head coach: Clem Haskins (7th season)
- Assistant coaches: Milton Barnes; Dan Kosmoski; Dave Thorson
- Home arena: Williams Arena (regular season); Target Center (NIT)

1992–93 Big Ten Conference men's basketball standings
	Conf.				Overall
Team	W		L	PCT	W		L	PCT
No. 1 Indiana	17	–	1	.944	31	–	4	.886
No. 13 Iowa	11	–	7	.611	23	–	9	.719
Illinois	11	–	7	.611	19	–	13	.594
Minnesota	9	–	9	.500	22	–	10	.688
No. 22 Purdue	9	–	9	.500	18	–	10	.643
Ohio State	8	–	10	.444	15	–	13	.536
Michigan State	7	–	11	.389	15	–	13	.536
Wisconsin	7	–	11	.389	14	–	14	.500
Northwestern	3	–	15	.167	8	–	19	.296
Penn State	2	–	16	.111	7	–	20	.259
No. 3 Michigan	0	–	3	.000	0	–	4	.000
Rankings from AP Poll; *Michigan vacated all games due to NCAA sanctions. Disputed record (15-3, 31-5)

== National Invitation Tournament ==
- First Round
  - Minnesota 74, Florida 66
- Second Round
  - Minnesota 86, Oklahoma 72
- Quarterfinal
  - Minnesota 76, USC 58
- Semifinal
  - Minnesota 76, Providence 70
- Final
  - Minnesota 62, Georgetown 61

== Awards and honors ==
- Voshon Lenard, NIT Most Valuable Player

== Team players drafted into the NBA ==
- No one from the Golden Gophers was selected in the 1993 NBA draft.
