= 1992–93 Michigan State Spartans men's basketball team =

American college basketball season

1992–93 Michigan State Spartans men's basketball

Los Angeles Classic champions Oldsmobile Spartan Classic champions

NIT, first round
- Conference: Big Ten Conference
- Record: 15–13 (7–11 Big Ten)
- Head coach: Jud Heathcote (17th season)
- Assistant coaches: Tom Izzo; Stan Joplin; Brian Gregory
- Captains: Mike Peplowski; Dwayne Stephens
- Home arena: Breslin Center

1992–93 Big Ten Conference men's basketball standings
	Conf.				Overall
Team	W		L	PCT	W		L	PCT
No. 1 Indiana	17	–	1	.944	31	–	4	.886
No. 13 Iowa	11	–	7	.611	23	–	9	.719
Illinois	11	–	7	.611	19	–	13	.594
Minnesota	9	–	9	.500	22	–	10	.688
No. 22 Purdue	9	–	9	.500	18	–	10	.643
Ohio State	8	–	10	.444	15	–	13	.536
Michigan State	7	–	11	.389	15	–	13	.536
Wisconsin	7	–	11	.389	14	–	14	.500
Northwestern	3	–	15	.167	8	–	19	.296
Penn State	2	–	16	.111	7	–	20	.259
No. 3 Michigan	0	–	3	.000	0	–	4	.000
Rankings from AP Poll; *Michigan vacated all games due to NCAA sanctions. Disputed record (15-3, 31-5)

The 1992–93 Michigan State Spartans men's basketball team represented Michigan State University in the 1992–93 NCAA Division I men's basketball season. The team played their home games at Breslin Center in East Lansing, Michigan and were members of the Big Ten Conference. They were coached by Jud Heathcote in his 17th year at Michigan State. The Spartans finished the season with a record of 15–13, 7–11 in Big Ten play to finish in eighth place. They received an at-large bid to the National Invitation Tournament where they lost in the first round to Oklahoma.

== Previous season ==
The Spartans finished the 1991–92 season with a record of 22–8, 11–7 in Big Ten play to finish in third place. Michigan State received an at-large bid to the NCAA Tournament as the No. 5 seed in the Midwest region. They beat Missouri State in the First Round before losing to Cincinnati in the Second Round.

== Roster ==
1992–93 Michigan State Spartans men's basketball team
No	Name	Pos	Year	Height	Pts	Reb	Ast
23	Daimon Beathea	F	FR	6–7	2.2	1.4	0.1
20	Mark Bluem	F	SO	6–6	0.0	0.2	0.0
40	Quinton Brooks	F	FR	6–7	4.2	2.7	0.3
30	Jamie Feick	F	FR	6–8	0.4	1.4	0.1
4	David Hart	G	FR	6–4	0.3	0.3	0.6
34	Anthony Miller	F	JR	6–9	6.6	5.1	0.4
22	Steve Nicodemus	G	FR	6–4	1.1	0.5	0.3
5	Andy Penick	G	SO	6–2	1.5	1.0	3.5
54	Mike Peplowski	C	SR	6–11	14.5	10.0	1.4
24	Shawn Respert	G	SO	6–3	20.1	4.0	2.6
13	Eric Snow	G	SO	6–3	4.3	2.6	5.2
31	Dwayne Stephens	F	SR	6–7	9.1	5.6	3.5
3	Kris Weshinskey	G	JR	6–4	10.4	3.4	2.4
25	Jon Zulauf	F	SR	6–6	4.4	2.7	0.4

== Schedule and results ==
Date time, TV	Rank^{#}	Opponent^{#}	Result	Record	Site city, state
Non-conference regular season
Dec 1, 1992*	No. 18	Morehead State	W 121–53	1–0	Breslin Center; East Lansing, MI
Dec 5, 1992*	No. 18	vs. No. 12 Louisville	L 69–73	1–1	
Dec 11, 1992*	No. 24	vs. Stetson; Los Angeles Classic semifinals	W 78–59	2–1	Gersten Pavilion; Los Angeles, CA
Dec 12, 1992*	No. 24	vs. Loyola Marymount; Los Angeles Classic championship	W 73–70	3–1	Gersten Pavilion; Los Angeles, CA
Dec 15, 1992*	No. 23	UIC	W 79–75	4–1	Breslin Center; East Lansing, MI
Dec 19, 1992*	No. 23	Dayton	W 65–60	5–1	Breslin Center; East Lansing, MI
Dec 29, 1992*	No. 17	New Hampshire; Oldsmobile Spartan Classic semifinals	W 81–51	6–1	Breslin Center; East Lansing, MI
Dec 30, 1992*	No. 17	Washington State; Oldsmobile Spartan Classic championship	W 77–61	7–1	Breslin Center; East Lansing, MI
Jan 2, 1993*	No. 17	at East Tennessee State	W 80–69	8–1	Memorial Center; Johnson City, TN
Big Ten regular season
Jan 6, 1993	No. 14	at Minnesota	L 57–64	8–2 (0–1)	Williams Arena; Minneapolis, MN
Jan 9, 1993	No. 14	Illinois	L 39–52	8–3 (0–2)	Breslin Center; East Lansing, MI
Jan 13, 1993	No. 23	at No. 21 Ohio State	W 77–60	9–3 (1–2)	St. John Arena; Columbus, OH
Jan 15, 1993	No. 23	at Northwestern	W 80–75	10–3 (2–2)	Welsh-Ryan Arena; Evanston, IL
Jan 23, 1993	No. 21	Wisconsin	L 66–67	10–4 (2–3)	Breslin Center; East Lansing, MI
Jan 28, 1993		No. 11 Iowa	L 90–96	10–5 (2–4)	Breslin Center; East Lansing, MI
Jan 30, 1993		at No. 14 Purdue	W 72–64	11–5 (3–4)	Mackey Arena; West Lafayette, IN
Feb 2, 1993	No. 25	No. 7 Michigan; Rivalry	L 69–73	11–6 (3–5)	Breslin Center; East Lansing, MI
Feb 6, 1993	No. 25	Minnesota	W 75–63	12–6 (4–5)	Breslin Center; East Lansing, MI
Feb 10, 1993		at Illinois	L 80–83	12–7 (4–6)	Assembly Hall; Champaign, IL
Feb 13, 1993		Ohio State	W 81–66	13–7 (5–6)	Breslin Center; East Lansing, MI
Feb 17, 1993		Northwestern	W 81–55	14–8 (6–6)	Breslin Center; East Lansing, MI
Feb 24, 1993		at Wisconsin	L 62–65	14–9 (6–7)	Wisconsin Field House; Madison, WI
Feb 27, 1993		at No. 18 Iowa	L 64–66	14–9 (6–8)	Carver-Hawkeye Arena; Iowa City, IA
Mar 3, 1993		No. 24 Purdue	L 58–61	14–10 (6–9)	Breslin Center; East Lansing, MI
Mar 7, 1993		at No. 4 Michigan; Rivalry	L 81–87	14–11 (6–10)	Crisler Arena; Ann Arbor, MI
Mar 10, 1993		at No. 2 Indiana	L 68–99	14–12 (6–11)	Assembly Hall; Bloomington, IN
Mar 13, 1993		Penn State	W 70–63	15–12 (7–11)	Breslin Center; East Lansing, MI
NIT
Mar 17, 1993*		at Oklahoma first round	L 86–88	15–13	Lloyd Noble Center; Norman, OK
*Non-conference game. ^{#}Rankings from AP Poll,. (#) Tournament seedings in parentheses. All times are in Central Time; Source.

== Rankings ==
Ranking movement Legend: ██ Increase in ranking. ██ Decrease in ranking. (RV) Received votes but unranked. (NR) Not ranked.
Poll	Pre	Wk 2	Wk 3	Wk 4	Wk 5	Wk 6	Wk 7	Wk 8	Wk 9	Wk 10	Wk 11	Wk 12	Wk 13	Wk 14	Wk 15	Wk 16	Wk 17	Wk 18	Wk 19
AP	20	18	18	24	23	20	17	14	23	21		25	NR						

Source.
