= Mike Peplowski =

American basketball player (born 1970)

Personal information
- Born: October 15, 1970 (age 56) Detroit, Michigan, U.S.
- Listed height: 6 ft 10 in (2.08 m)
- Listed weight: 270 lb (122 kg)

Career information
- High school: De La Salle (Warren, Michigan)
- College: Michigan State (1989–1993)
- NBA draft: 1993: 2nd round, 52nd overall pick
- Drafted by: Sacramento Kings
- Playing career: 1993–1996
- Position: Center
- Number: 54

Career history
- 1993–1994: Sacramento Kings
- 1994–1995: Detroit Pistons
- 1995: FC Barcelona
- 1995: Washington Bullets
- 1996: Milwaukee Bucks

Career highlights
- Fourth-team Parade All-American (1988)

Career NBA statistics
- Points: 194 (2.9 ppg)
- Rebounds: 176 (2.6 rpg)
- Assists: 26 (0.4 apg)
- Stats at NBA.com
- Stats at Basketball Reference
Medals
Men's basketball
Representing the United States
Pan American Games
Bronze medal – third place	1991 Havana	Team competition

Michael Walter Peplowski (born October 15, 1970) is an American former professional basketball player who was selected by the Sacramento Kings in the second round (52nd pick overall) of the 1993 NBA draft. A 6'10" and 270 lb center, Peplowski played for the Kings, Detroit Pistons, Washington Bullets and Milwaukee Bucks over the course of three NBA seasons. After graduating from De La Salle Collegiate High School in Warren, Michigan in 1988, Peplowski played collegiately at Michigan State University.

== Career statistics ==
Legend
GP	Games played	GS	Games started	MPG	Minutes per game
FG%	Field goal percentage	3P%	3-point field goal percentage	FT%	Free throw percentage
RPG	Rebounds per game	APG	Assists per game	SPG	Steals per game
BPG	Blocks per game	PPG	Points per game	**Bold**	Career high

=== NBA ===
Year	Team	GP	GS	MPG	FG%	3P%	FT%	RPG	APG	SPG	BPG	PPG
1993–94	Sacramento	**55**	**19**	**12.1**	.539	.000	**.545**	**3.1**	**0.4**	**0.3**	**0.5**	**3.2**
1994–95	Detroit	6	0	3.5	**1.000**	.000	.500	0.5	0.2	0.2	0.0	1.8
1995–96	Washington	2	0	2.5	.000	.000	.000	0.0	0.0	0.0	0.0	0.0
1995–96	Milwaukee	5	0	2.4	.600	.000	.333	0.8	0.2	0.2	0.4	1.4
Career		68	19	10.4	.556	.000	.531	2.6	0.4	0.3	0.4	2.9

=== College ===
Year	Team	GP	GS	MPG	FG%	3P%	FT%	RPG	APG	SPG	BPG	PPG
1989–90	Michigan State	28	23	19.3	.545	.000	.628	5.8	0.7	0.3	0.4	5.3
1990–91	Michigan State	**30**	-	24.5	.627	.000	.680	6.9	0.5	0.4	0.6	7.7
1991–92	Michigan State	**30**	**29**	26.4	.632	.000	**.688**	8.6	1.1	**0.5**	0.6	13.3
1992–93	Michigan State	28	27	**29.1**	**.639**	.000	.667	**10.0**	**1.4**	0.2	**0.9**	**14.5**
Career		116	79	24.8	.621	.000	.670	7.8	0.9	0.3	0.6	10.2
