= Calbert Cheaney =

American basketball player

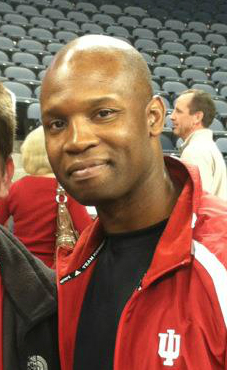

Personal information
- Born: July 17, 1971 (age 55) Evansville, Indiana, U.S.
- Listed height: 6 ft 7 in (2.01 m)
- Listed weight: 210 lb (95 kg)

Career information
- High school: William Henry Harrison (Evansville, Indiana)
- College: Indiana (1989–1993)
- NBA draft: 1993: 1st round, 6th overall pick
- Drafted by: Washington Bullets
- Playing career: 1993–2006
- Position: Shooting guard / small forward
- Number: 40, 29
- Coaching career: 2013–present

Career history

Playing
- 1993–1999: Washington Bullets / Wizards
- 1999–2000: Boston Celtics
- 2000–2002: Denver Nuggets
- 2002–2003: Utah Jazz
- 2003–2006: Golden State Warriors

Career highlights
- National college player of the year (1993); Consensus first-team All-American (1993); Second-team All-American – USBWA (1991); 2× Third-team All-American – AP, NABC, UPI (1991, 1992); Big Ten Player of the Year (1993)

Career NBA statistics
- Points: 7,826 (9.5 ppg)
- Rebounds: 2,610 (3.2 rpg)
- Assists: 1,398 (1.7 apg)
- Stats at NBA.com
- Stats at Basketball Reference
Medals
Men's basketball
Representing United States
FIBA Americas U18 Championship
Gold medal – first place	1990 Montevideo	National team
Summer Universiade
Gold medal – first place	1991 Sheffield	National team

Calbert Nathaniel Cheaney (born July 17, 1971) is an American basketball coach and former player who served as Director of player development for the Indiana Hoosiers men's basketball of the Big Ten. He starred as a player for the Indiana Hoosiers men's basketball from 1989 to 1993 under coach Bob Knight. Cheaney ended his career as a three-time All-American and remains the Big Ten's all-time leading scorer with 2,613 career points. He led Indiana to a 105–27 record and the NCAA Tournament all four years, including a Final Four appearance in 1992.

At the conclusion of his collegiate basketball career Cheaney captured virtually every post-season honor available, including National Player of the Year (winning both the Wooden and Naismith award), a unanimous All-American, and Big Ten Player of the Year. Cheaney spent 13 years in the NBA playing for five different teams.

== Early life ==
Born in Evansville, Indiana, Cheaney played high school ball at William Henry Harrison High School in Evansville and was selected to the 1989 Indiana All-Star team. Cheaney was a high school stand-out, but a season-ending injury midway through his senior year pushed him off the national radar and left him as a virtual unknown in Indiana University's #1 ranked recruiting class of 1989.

== College career ==
Cheaney played small forward for the Indiana University Hoosiers under head coach Bob Knight.

=== Freshman year ===
The 1989–90 team ran into tough competition in January after winning all 10 of their pre-conference games. Taken aback by the intensity of play within the Big Ten, the young Hoosier squad went 8–10 in conference play and were upset by California in their NCAA Tournament opening game. Cheaney averaged 17 points a game as a freshman.

"Our freshman year was very, very subpar," Cheaney said. "We started out excellent and when we got into the Big Ten we were in for a rude awakening. I knew once that season was over and we started working out over the summer, we were going to become a pretty good team. I knew we were going to be a team to be reckoned with the next three years."

=== Sophomore year ===
Cheaney averaged 21.6 points per game as a sophomore, with the Hoosiers ending the 1990–91 regular season with an overall record of 29–5 and a conference record of 15–3, finishing 1st in the Big Ten Conference. As conference champions, the Hoosiers were invited to participate in the 1991 NCAA Tournament as a 2-seed, where they advanced to the Sweet Sixteen. Cheaney noted, "I had a very good sophomore year, but I played a lot of international ball. I played on the Tournament of America team and the World University team. I think I wore myself out a little bit, and when my junior year rolled around, I wasn't up to par."

=== Junior year ===
As a junior during the 1991–92 season, Cheaney felt he struggled from being worn down by substantial play over the summer. Moreover, with the addition of other talent from players like Alan Henderson, Cheaney "didn't have to score as much." He regressed to an average of 17.6 points per game and his three-point shooting percentage dropped significantly. The Hoosiers finished the regular season with an overall record of 27–7 and a conference record of 14–4, finishing 2nd in the Big Ten Conference. The Hoosiers were invited to participate in the 1992 NCAA Tournament as a 2-seed, where they advanced to the Final Four, but fell to Duke in a foul-plagued game in Minneapolis.

In the West Regional final while preparing to face UCLA in Albuquerque, just before practice ended, head coach Bob Knight ran the whip across Cheaney's backside as Cheaney, the team's leading scorer, was bent over, with his shorts pulled down slightly. On Thursday, both Albuquerque newspapers published photographs of the incident. Cheaney appeared to be laughing in one of the photos.

=== Senior year ===
During the 1992–93 season, Cheaney averaged 22.4 points per game and 6.2 rebounds per game. The Hoosiers finished the regular season with an overall record of 31–4 and a conference record of 17–1, finishing 1st in the Big Ten Conference. As the Big Ten Conference Champions, the Hoosiers were invited to participate in the 1993 NCAA Tournament as a 1-seed, where they advanced to the Elite Eight for the second year in a row, but were defeated by Kansas.

Over the course of his career at Indiana, Cheaney scored 30 or more points thirteen times and averaged 19.8 points per game. He has 2,613 career points, and is the all-time leading scorer of the Big Ten. He was the Big Ten Player of the Year, Naismith College Player of the Year, winner of the John R. Wooden Award, and a unanimous All-America

== Professional career ==
=== NBA career ===
Cheaney was selected 6th overall by the Washington Bullets in the 1993 NBA draft. His strongest showing as pro came in 1994–1995 when he averaged a career-high 16.6 points for Washington. He spent six years playing for the Bullets/Wizards (including a playoff appearance in 1997). He would go on to play for the Boston Celtics, Denver Nuggets, and Utah Jazz, before closing his career out with three years with the Golden State Warriors, retiring after the 2005–06 season. During his thirteen-year NBA career, Cheaney played for five different teams, averaging 9.5 points and 3.2 rebounds.

Cheaney appeared along with many of his 1997 Bullet teammates (Juwan Howard, Ben Wallace, and Ashraf Amaya) in singer Crystal Waters' 1996 video "Say... If You Feel Alright". He also appeared in the 1994 film Blue Chips as a player for the Indiana University Hoosiers.

=== Post-NBA ===
Following his retirement as a player, Cheaney spent two seasons on the staff for the Golden State Warriors. He was a special assistant in the front office in 2009–10, and in 2010–11 he was an assistant coach under fellow Indiana alumnus Keith Smart. He then returned to Indiana in 2011 and served as Director of Basketball Operations under coach Tom Crean. The following year he added the title of Director of Internal and External Player Development.

On August 21, 2013, Cheaney announced that he had accepted an assistant coach position at Saint Louis University under head coach Jim Crews, a fellow alumnus of Indiana University. During his first season with St. Louis in 2013–14 the Billikens finished with a 27–7 record and secured an Atlantic 10 Conference regular-season title and an NCAA Tournament appearance. Cheaney left the St. Louis staff in 2016 with the departure of Crews as head coach. Cheaney is currently Director of Player Development at Indiana University, a position he started in 2023.

== Career statistics ==
=== NBA ===
Legend
GP	Games played	GS	Games started	MPG	Minutes per game
FG%	Field goal percentage	3P%	3-point field goal percentage	FT%	Free throw percentage
RPG	Rebounds per game	APG	Assists per game	SPG	Steals per game
BPG	Blocks per game	PPG	Points per game	**Bold**	Career high
*	Led the league

==== Regular season ====
Year	Team	GP	GS	MPG	FG%	3P%	FT%	RPG	APG	SPG	BPG	PPG
1993–94	Washington	65	21	24.7	.470	.043	.770	2.9	1.9	1.0	.2	12.0
1994–95	Washington	78	71	34.0	.453	.339	.812	**4.1**	**2.3**	1.0	.3	**16.6**
1995–96	Washington	70	70	33.2	.471	.338	.706	3.4	2.2	1.0	.3	15.1
1996–97	Washington	79	79	30.6	**.505**	.133	.693	3.4	1.4	1.0	.2	10.6
1997–98	Washington	**82***	**82***	**34.6**	.457	.283	.647	4.0	2.1	**1.2**	**.4**	12.8
1998–99	Washington	50*	18	25.3	.414	.216	.493	2.8	1.5	.8	.3	7.7
1999–00	Boston	67	19	19.5	.440	.333	.429	2.1	1.2	.7	.2	4.0
2000–01	Denver	9	5	17.0	.333	–	.500	2.2	1.0	.4	.2	2.3
2001–02	Denver	68	47	24.0	.481	.000	.687	3.5	1.6	.5	.3	7.3
2002–03	Utah	81	74	29.0	.499	**.400**	.580	3.5	2.0	.8	.2	8.6
2003–04	Golden State	79	7	26.2	.481	.000	.610	3.3	1.7	.8	.2	7.6
2004–05	Golden State	55	5	17.3	.426	.000	.649	2.3	1.2	.3	.3	4.5
2005–06	Golden State	42	0	10.7	.389	.000	**1.000**	1.5	.5	.3	.0	2.2
Career		825	498	26.7	.466	.298	.691	3.2	1.7	.8	.2	9.5

==== Playoffs ====
Year	Team	GP	GS	MPG	FG%	3P%	FT%	RPG	APG	SPG	BPG	PPG
1997	Washington	3	3	**40.0**	**.439**	.000	**.750**	**3.7**	1.3	**1.0**	**.7**	**15.0**
2003	Utah	**5**	**5**	20.4	.370	–	.500	1.4	**1.6**	.4	.2	4.4
Career		8	8	30.3	.412	.000	.688	2.3	1.5	.6	.4	8.4

=== College ===
College statistics
Year	Team	GP	GS	MPG	FG%	3P%	FT%	RPG	APG	SPG	BPG	PPG
1989–90	Indiana	29	29	32.0	.572	**.490**	.750	4.6	1.7	.8	**.6**	17.1
1990–91	Indiana	34	34	30.3	**.596**	.473	**.801**	5.5	1.4	.7	.4	21.6
1991–92	Indiana	34	32	29.1	.522	.384	.800	4.9	1.4	**1.1**	.2	17.6
1992–93	Indiana	**35**	**35**	**33.7**	.549	.427	.795	**6.4**	**2.4**	.9	.3	**22.4**
Career		132	130	31.3	.559	.438	.790	5.4	1.7	.9	.3	19.8

== Basketball honors ==
- 1993: Won all 12 NCAA National Player of the year awards. Unanimous First-Team All America
- All-America 1991, 1992, 1993
- 1993 Big Ten Conference MVP
- All-Big Ten 1991, 1992, 1993
- Big Ten's All Time Scoring Leader (2,613)
- Indiana University's All-Time leading scorer
- Four time IU team MVP
- Selected to Indiana University's All-Century First Team
- 1993 USBWA College Player of the Year
