= 1992–93 NCAA Division I men's basketball rankings =

- Season: 1992–93
- NCAA Tournament: 1993
- Preseason No. 1: Michigan
- NCAA Tournament Champions: North Carolina
NCAA Division I men's basketball rankings


The 1992–93 NCAA Division I men's basketball rankings was made up of two human polls, the AP Poll and the Coaches Poll, in addition to various other preseason polls.

== Legend ==
	Increase in ranking
	Decrease in ranking
	New to rankings from previous week
Italics	Number of first place votes
(#–#)	Win–loss record
т	Tied with team above or below also with this symbol

== AP Poll ==
The final AP poll was released before the NCAA Tournament on March 14, 1993.

	Preseason	Week 1 Nov. 23	Week 2 Nov. 30	Week 3 Dec. 7	Week 4 Dec. 14	Week 5 Dec. 21	Week 6 Dec. 28	Week 7 Jan. 4	Week 8 Jan. 11	Week 9 Jan. 18	Week 10 Jan. 25	Week 11 Feb. 1	Week 12 Feb. 8	Week 13 Feb. 15	Week 14 Feb. 22	Week 15 Mar. 1	Week 16 Mar. 8	Final Final	
1.	Michigan	Michigan (0–0) (24)	Michigan (0–0)	Duke (2–0)	Duke (4–0)	Duke (4–0)	Duke (7–0)	Duke (8–0)	Kentucky (11–0)	Kansas (14–1)	Kansas (16–1)	Indiana (19–2)	Indiana (20–2)	Indiana (22–2)	Indiana (24–2)	North Carolina (24–3)	North Carolina (25–3)	Indiana (28–3)	1.
2.	Kansas	Kansas (0–0) (18)	Indiana (4–0)	Kansas (2–0)	Kansas (5–0)	Kansas (6–0)	Kansas (8–0)	Kentucky (9–0)	Michigan (12–1)	Indiana (15–2)	Indiana (17–2)	Kentucky (15–1)	Kentucky (17–1)	Kentucky (18–2)	Kentucky (20–2)	Indiana (25–3)	Indiana (26–3)	Kentucky (26–3)	2.
3.	Duke	Duke (0–0) (15)	Kansas (0–0)	Kentucky (2–0)	Kentucky (4–0)	Kentucky (5–0)	Kentucky (6–0)	Michigan (10–1)	Duke (10–1)	North Carolina (14–1)	North Carolina (16–1)	Kansas (17–2)	Duke (17–3)	North Carolina (20–3)	North Carolina (22–3)	Arizona (21–2)	Michigan (23–4)	Michigan (26–4)	3.
4.	Indiana	Indiana (2–0) (6)	Duke (0–0)	Indiana (4–1)	Indiana (7–1)	Indiana (8–1)	Indiana (10–1)	Kansas (9–1)	Kansas (11–1)	Kentucky (11–1)	Kentucky (13–1)	Cincinnati (15–1)	Michigan (18–3)	Arizona (17–2)	Arizona (19–2)	Michigan (22–4)	Kentucky (23–3)	North Carolina (28–4)	4.
5.	Kentucky	Kentucky (0–0)	Kentucky (0–0)	North Carolina (3–0)	North Carolina (5–0)	North Carolina (6–0)	North Carolina (7–0)	Indiana (11–2)	North Carolina (12–1)	Michigan (13–2)	Michigan (15–2)	Duke (15–3)	Arizona (15–2)	Michigan (19–4)	Michigan (21–4)	Kentucky (21–3)	Vanderbilt (25–4)	Arizona (24–3)	5.
6.	Seton Hall	Seton Hall (2–0) (2)	Seton Hall (4–1)	Michigan (1–1)	Michigan (3–1)	Michigan (5–1)	Michigan (6–1)	North Carolina (9–1)	Indiana (13–2)	Duke (12–2)	Cincinnati (13–1)	North Carolina (17–2)	North Carolina (18–3)	Kansas (20–3)	Florida State (21–6)	Duke (22–5)	Arizona (22–3)	Seton Hall (27–6)	6.
7.	North Carolina	Florida State (2–0)	North Carolina (0–0)	Seton Hall (4–1)	Seton Hall (6–1)	Seton Hall (8–1)	Seton Hall (9–1)	Seton Hall (11–1)	Seton Hall (13–1)	Virginia (11–0)	Duke (13–3)	Michigan (16–3)	Kansas (18–3)	Duke (19–4)	Kansas (21–4)	Vanderbilt (23–4)	Kansas (23–5)	Cincinnati (24–4)	7.
8.	Memphis State	North Carolina (0–0)	Memphis State (0–0)	Iowa (3–0)	Iowa (5–0)	Iowa (6–0)	Iowa (8–0)	Iowa (10–0)	Georgia Tech (9–1)	Arkansas (12–1)	Arizona (11–2)	Arizona (13–2)	Cincinnati (17–2)	Cincinnati (19–2)	Vanderbilt (21–4)	Kansas (22–5)	Duke (23–5)	Vanderbilt (26–5)	8.
9.	Florida State	Memphis State (0–0)	Arizona (0–0)	Louisville (1–0)	Oklahoma (5–0)	Oklahoma (5–0)	Arkansas (7–0)	Purdue (9–0)	Arkansas (11–1)	Cincinnati (11–1)	Seton Hall (15–3)	Iowa (14–3)	Wake Forest (15–3)	Florida State (19–6)	Duke (20–5)	Utah (22–3)	Seton Hall (24–6)	Kansas (25–6)	9.
10.	Arizona	Arizona (0–0)	Iowa (0–0)	Florida State (3–2)	Florida State (3–2)	Arkansas (5–0)	Georgetown (5–0)	Georgia Tech (7–1)	Oklahoma (11–2)	Seton Hall (14–2)	UNLV (11–1)	UNLV (13–1)	Florida State (16–6)	Wake Forest (16–4)	Cincinnati (20–3)	Seton Hall (22–6)	Florida State (22–8)	Duke (23–7)	10.
11.	Iowa	Iowa (0–0)	Florida State (2–2)	Georgetown (2–0)	Georgetown (4–0)	Georgetown (5–0)	UCLA (7–1)	Oklahoma (10–1)	Cincinnati (9–1)	Arizona (9–2)	Iowa (14–3)	Vanderbilt (16–3)	Vanderbilt (17–4)	Vanderbilt (19–4)	Utah (21–3)	Florida State (21–8)	Cincinnati (22–4)	Florida State (22–9)	11.
12.	Georgetown	Louisville (0–0)	Louisville (0–0)	Oklahoma (2–0)	Arkansas (3–0)	UCLA (6–1)	Syracuse (8–0)	UNLV (6–0)	Arizona (7–2)	Oklahoma (12–3)	Vanderbilt (14–3)	Florida State (14–6)	UNLV (14–2)	Utah (19–3)	Wake Forest (17–5)	Cincinnati (21–4)	Wake Forest (19–7)	Arkansas (20–8)	12.
13.	Louisville	Georgetown (0–0)	Georgia Tech (0–0)	UCLA (4–1)	UCLA (5–1)	Syracuse (7–0)	Purdue (6–0)	Arkansas (8–1)	Iowa (11–2)	Purdue (11–2)	Pittsburgh (13–2)	Wake Forest (13–3)	Iowa (14–5)	Arkansas (16–5)	UNLV (17–3)	Arkansas (18–6)	New Orleans (25–2)	Iowa (22–8)	13.
14.	Georgia Tech	Georgia Tech (0–0)	Georgetown (0–0)	Arizona (0–1)	Syracuse (3–0)	Arizona (2–1)	Georgia Tech (5–1)	Michigan State (8–1)	Virginia (9–0)	Iowa (12–3)	Purdue (11–3)	Seton Hall (15–5)	Arkansas (15–4)	Purdue (15–5)	Seton Hall (20–6)	Wake Forest (18–6)	Arkansas (19–7)	UMass (23–6)	14.
15.	Oklahoma	Oklahoma (0–0)	Oklahoma (0–0)	Syracuse (3–0)	Arizona (2–1)	Purdue (5–0)	Oklahoma (7–1)	UCLA (9–2)	Connecticut (7–2)	UNLV (9–1)	Virginia (11–2)	Pittsburgh (13–3)	Marquette (17–2)	UNLV (16–3)	Arkansas (17–6)	Iowa (19–6)	Utah (22–5)	Louisville (20–8)	15.
16.	Connecticut	Connecticut (0–0)	UCLA (3–1)	Arkansas (3–0)	Purdue (4–0)	Georgia Tech (2–1)	UNLV (4–0)	Cincinnati (6–1)	UCLA (10–3)	Georgia Tech (9–3)	Arkansas (12–3)	Oklahoma (14–5)	Utah (17–3)	Seton Hall (18–6)	Tulane (20–4)	UNLV (19–4)	Louisville (18–8)	Wake Forest (19–8)	16.
17.	Tulane	Syracuse (0–0)	Syracuse (0–0)	Georgia Tech (1–1)	Georgia Tech (2–1)	Nebraska (6–0)	Michigan State (5–1)	Georgetown (7–1)	Purdue (9–2)	Connecticut (8–3)	Utah (14–2)	Arkansas (13–4)	Pittsburgh (14–4)	Pittsburgh (15–5)	Purdue (15–6)	New Orleans (23–2)	Iowa (19–8)	New Orleans (26–3)	17.
18.	Syracuse	Michigan State (0–0)	Michigan State (0–0)	Purdue (3–0)	Tulane (5–1)	Florida State (5–3)	Florida State (6–3)	Vanderbilt (11–1)	UNLV (6–1)	Georgetown (10–2)	Georgia Tech (10–4)	Tulane (15–3)	Purdue (13–5)	Tulane (17–4)	Iowa (16–6)	Xavier (20–3)	Purdue (17–8)	Georgia Tech (19–10)	18.
19.	Iowa State	Tulane (1–1)	UMass (0–0)	Cincinnati (1–0)	Cincinnati (3–0)	UNLV (3–0)	California (5–0)	Connecticut (6–1)	Minnesota (10–1)	Vanderbilt (13–3)	Florida State (13–5)	Purdue (12–4)	Seton Hall (16–6)	UMass (17–4)	New Orleans (20–2)	Oklahoma State (18–5)	UNLV (20–6)	Utah (23–6)	19.
20.	Michigan State	UMass (0–0)	Tulane (1–1)	Tulane (3–1)	Nebraska (5–0)	Michigan State (5–1)	Nebraska (7–1)	Arizona (5–2)	Georgetown (8–2)	Pittsburgh (11–2)	Oklahoma (12–5)	Marquette (15–2)	Tulane (16–4)	Iowa (14–6)	Marquette (19–4)	Tulane (20–6)	UMass (20–6)	Western Kentucky (24–5)	20.
21.	Cincinnati	UCLA (2–0)	New Mexico State (3–0)	Memphis State (0–1)	Louisville (1–2)	California (4–0)	Cincinnati (4–1)	Syracuse (8–2)	Ohio State (9–2)	Michigan State (10–3)	Georgetown (11–3)	Utah (15–3)	Boston College (13–5)	New Orleans (17–2)	UMass (18–5)	BYU (22–6)	Oklahoma State (19–7)	New Mexico (24–6)	21.
22.	UNLV	UNLV (0–0)	Cincinnati (0–0)	UNLV (1–0)	UNLV (2–0)	Connecticut (3–1)	Arizona (2–2)	UMass (5–2)	Boston College (9–2)	Utah (12–2)	Connecticut (9–4)	Georgia Tech (11–5)	UMass (15–4)	Louisville (14–6)	Virginia (16–6)	Louisville (16–8)	Xavier (21–4)	Purdue (17–9)	22.
23.	UMass	Cincinnati (0–0)	UNLV (0–0)	UMass (1–1)	Michigan State (3–1)	Cincinnati (3–1)	Connecticut (4–1)	Florida State (8–4)	Michigan State (8–3)	UCLA (11–4)	Tulane (14–3)	Georgetown (12–4)	Kansas State (14–3)	Virginia (15–5)	BYU (21–5)	UMass (18–6)	Tulane (21–7)	Oklahoma State (19–8)	23.
24.	UCLA	Iowa State (1–1)	Purdue (1–0)	Michigan State (1–1)	Connecticut (3–1)	Tulane (5–2)	Vanderbilt (8–1)	Pittsburgh (8–1)	Syracuse (9–2)	Ohio State (9–3)	Marquette (14–2)	Virginia (12–4)	Virginia (13–4)	Marquette (17–4)	Xavier (18–3)	Purdue (15–8)	New Mexico State (23–6)	New Mexico State (25–7)	24.
25.	Nebraska	Nebraska (0–0)	Connecticut (0–1)	Nebraska (2–0)	California (3–0)	Vanderbilt (8–1)	BYU (7–2)	Virginia (7–0)	Utah (10–2)	Long Beach State (12–1)	Houston (11–2)	Michigan State (11–5)	New Orleans (17–2)	St. John's (14–6)	Pittsburgh (15–7)	St. John's (16–8)	BYU (23–7)	UNLV (21–7)	25.
	Preseason	Week 1 Nov. 23	Week 2 Nov. 30	Week 3 Dec. 7	Week 4 Dec. 14	Week 5 Dec. 21	Week 6 Dec. 28	Week 7 Jan. 4	Week 8 Jan. 11	Week 9 Jan. 18	Week 10 Jan. 25	Week 11 Feb. 1	Week 12 Feb. 8	Week 13 Feb. 15	Week 14 Feb. 22	Week 15 Mar. 1	Week 16 Mar. 8	Final Final	
		None	Dropped: Iowa State; Nebraska	Dropped: New Mexico State; Connecticut	Dropped: Memphis State; UMass (2–2)	Dropped: Louisville	Dropped: Tulane	Dropped: California (5–2); Nebraska (9–3); BYU (8–4)	Dropped: Vanderbilt (11–3); UMass; Florida State (9–5); Pittsburgh	Dropped: Minnesota; Boston College; Syracuse	Dropped: Michigan State; UCLA (12–5); Ohio State; Long Beach State	Dropped: Connecticut; Houston	Dropped: Oklahoma (14–7); Georgia Tech (12–6); Georgetown; Michigan State	Dropped: Boston College; Kansas State	Dropped: Louisville; St. John's	Dropped: Marquette (19–6); Virginia (16–8); Pittsburgh	Dropped: St. John's	Dropped: Xavier; Tulane; BYU	

== Coaches Poll ==
The final Coaches poll was released after the NCAA Tournament to cap the 1992–93 season.

	Preseason	Week 2 Nov. 30	Week 3 Dec. 7	Week 4 Dec. 14	Week 5 Dec. 21	Week 6 Dec. 28	Week 7 Jan. 4	Week 8 Jan. 11	Week 9 Jan. 18	Week 10 Jan. 25	Week 11 Feb. 1	Week 12 Feb. 8	Week 13 Feb. 15	Week 14 Feb. 22	Week 15 Mar. 1	Week 16 Mar. 8	Week 17 Mar. 15	Final Final	
1.	Michigan	Indiana (4–0)	Duke (2–0)	Duke (4–0)	Duke (4–0)	Duke (7–0)	Duke (8–0)	Kentucky (11–0)	Kansas (14–1)	Kansas (16–1)	Indiana (19–2)	Indiana (20–2)	Indiana (22–2)	Indiana (24–2)	North Carolina (24–3)	North Carolina (25–3)	Indiana (28–3)	North Carolina (34–4)	1.
2.	Duke	Michigan (0–0)	Kansas (2–0)	Kansas (5–0)	Kansas (6–0)	Kansas (8–0)	Kentucky (9–0)	Duke (10–1)	Indiana (15–2)	North Carolina (16–1)	Kentucky (15–1)	Kentucky (17–1)	Kentucky (18–2)	Kentucky (20–2)	Indiana (25–3)	Indiana (26–3)	North Carolina (28–4)	Michigan (31–5)	2.
3.	Indiana	Duke (0–0)	Indiana (4–1)	Kentucky (4–0)	Kentucky (5–0)	Kentucky (6–0)	Michigan (10–1)	Michigan (12–1)	Duke (12–2)	Indiana (17–2)	Kansas (17–2)	Duke (17–3)	North Carolina (20–3)	North Carolina (22–3)	Arizona (21–2)	Michigan (23–4)	Kentucky (26–3)	Kentucky (30–4)	3.
4.	Kansas	Kansas (0–0)	Kentucky (2–0)	Indiana (7–1)	Indiana (8–1)	Indiana (10–1)	Indiana (11–2)	Indiana (13–2)	North Carolina (14–1)	Kentucky (13–1)	Cincinnati (15–1)	Michigan (18–3)	Kansas (20–3)	Arizona (19–2)	Kentucky (21–3)	Kentucky (23–3)	Michigan (26–4)	Kansas (29–7)	4.
5.	Kentucky	Kentucky (0–0)	Michigan (1–1)	North Carolina (5–0)	North Carolina (6–0)	North Carolina (7–0)	North Carolina (9–1)	Kansas (11–1)	Michigan (13–2)	Michigan (15–2)	North Carolina (17–2)	Kansas (18–3)	Michigan (19–4)	Michigan (21–4)	Michigan (22–4)	Arizona (22–3)	Arizona (24–3)	Indiana (31–4)	5.
6.	Seton Hall	Seton Hall (4–1)	North Carolina (3–0)	Michigan (3–1)	Michigan (5–1)	Michigan (6–1)	Kansas (9–1)	North Carolina (12–1)	Kentucky (11–1)	Cincinnati (13–1)	Duke (15–3)	North Carolina (18–3)	Arizona (17–2)	Kansas (21–4)	Duke (22–5)	Vanderbilt (25–4)	Seton Hall (27–6)	Cincinnati (29–5)	6.
7.	North Carolina	North Carolina (0–0)	Seton Hall (4–1)	Seton Hall (6–1)	Seton Hall (8–1)	Seton Hall (9–1)	Seton Hall (11–1)	Seton Hall (13–1)	Arkansas (12–1)	Duke (13–3)	Arizona (13–2)	Arizona (15–2)	Cincinnati (19–2)	Florida State (21–6)	Kansas (22–5)	Kansas (23–5)	Cincinnati (24–4)	Florida State (25–10)	7.
8.	Florida State	Memphis State (0–0)	Florida State (3–2)	Iowa (5–0)	Iowa (6–0)	Iowa (8–0)	Iowa (10–0)	Georgia Tech (9–1)	Cincinnati (11–1)	Arizona (11–2)	Iowa (14–3)	Cincinnati (17–2)	Duke (19–4)	Cincinnati (20–3)	Vanderbilt (23–4)	Duke (23–5)	Kansas (25–6)	Vanderbilt (28–6)	8.
9.	Memphis State	Arizona (0–0)	Louisville (1–0)	Florida State (3–2)	Oklahoma (5–0)	Arkansas (7–0)	Purdue (9–0)	Oklahoma (11–2)	Seton Hall (14–2)	UNLV (11–1)	Michigan (16–3)	Iowa (14–5)	Florida State (19–6)	Vanderbilt (21–4)	Utah (22–3)	Cincinnati (22–4)	Vanderbilt (26–5)	Duke (24–8)	9.
10.	Arizona	Florida State (2–2)	Iowa (3–0)	Arizona (2–1)	UCLA (6–1)	UCLA (7–1)	Oklahoma (10–1)	Arkansas (11–1)	Virginia (11–0)	Seton Hall (15–3)	UNLV (13–1)	UNLV (14–2)	Vanderbilt (19–4)	Duke (20–5)	Cincinnati (21–4)	Seton Hall (24–6)	Duke (23–7)	Arkansas (22–9)	10.
11.	Georgetown	UCLA (3–1)	Georgetown (2–0)	Oklahoma (5–0)	Arkansas (5–0)	Georgetown (5–0)	Georgia Tech (7–1)	Cincinnati (9–1)	Oklahoma (12–3)	Iowa (14–3)	Vanderbilt (16–3)	Arkansas (15–4)	Wake Forest (16–4)	Utah (21–3)	Florida State (21–8)	Florida State (22–8)	Florida State (22–9)	Seton Hall (28–7)	11.
12.	Louisville	Georgetown (0–0)	Arizona (0–1)	Georgetown (4–0)	Arizona (2–1)	Purdue (6–0)	UCLA (9–2)	Arizona (7–2)	Arizona (9–2)	Arkansas (12–3)	Arkansas (13–4)	Florida State (16–6)	Arkansas (16–5)	Wake Forest (17–5)	Seton Hall (22–6)	Wake Forest (19–7)	Arkansas (20–8)	Arizona (24–4)	12.
13.	Iowa	Louisville (0–0)	UCLA (4–1)	UCLA (5–1)	Georgetown (5–0)	Georgia Tech (5–1) т	Arkansas (8–1)	Iowa (11–2)	Iowa (12–3)	Vanderbilt (14–3)	Oklahoma (14–5)	Vanderbilt (17–4)	Utah (19–3)	UNLV (17–3)	Arkansas (18–6)	Utah (22–5)	Iowa (22–8)	Temple (20–13)	13.
14.	Tulane	Iowa (0–0)	Oklahoma (2–0)	Purdue (4–0)	Purdue (5–0)	Oklahoma (7–1) т	UNLV (6–0)	UCLA (10–3)	Purdue (11–2)	Virginia (11–2)	Seton Hall (15–5)	Utah (17–3)	UNLV (16–3)	Arkansas (17–6)	UNLV (19–4)	Arkansas (19–7)	Louisville (20–8)	Wake Forest (21–9)	14.
15.	Georgia Tech	Georgia Tech (0–0)	Purdue (3–0)	Arkansas (3–0)	Georgia Tech (2–1)	UNLV (4–0)	Michigan State (8–1)	Purdue (9–2)	Connecticut (8–3)	Purdue (11–3)	Florida State (14–6)	Wake Forest (15–3)	Pittsburgh (15–5)	Seton Hall (20–6)	Iowa (19–6)	New Orleans (25–2)	Wake Forest (19–8)	Louisville (22–9)	15.
16.	Oklahoma	Oklahoma (0–0)	Arkansas (3–0)	Georgia Tech (2–1)	Nebraska (6–0)	Florida State (6–3)	Cincinnati (6–1)	Connecticut (7–2)	Georgia Tech (9–3)	Connecticut (9–4)	Purdue (12–4)	Marquette (17–2)	Iowa (14–6)	Iowa (16–6)	Wake Forest (18–6)	UNLV (20–6)	Utah (23–6)	Western Kentucky (26–6)	16.
17.	UCLA	Purdue (1–0)	Georgia Tech (1–1)	Tulane (5–1)	UNLV (3–0)	Arizona (2–2)	Arizona (5–2)	UNLV (6–1)	UNLV (9–1)	Georgia Tech (10–4)	Pittsburgh (13–3)	Pittsburgh (14–4)	Purdue (15–5)	Tulane (20–4)	New Orleans (23–2)	Iowa (19–8)	UMass (23–6)	California (21–9)	17.
18.	Texas т	Michigan State (0–0)	Michigan State (1–1)	Cincinnati (3–0)	Florida State (5–3)	Michigan State (5–1)	Georgetown (7–1)	Virginia (9–0)	Georgetown (10–2)	Pittsburgh (13–2)	Utah (15–3)	Seton Hall (16–6)	Seton Hall (18–6)	Purdue (15–6)	Xavier (20–3)	Purdue (17–8)	New Orleans (26–3)	Virginia (21–10)	18.
19.	Cincinnati т	Tulane (1–1)	Tulane (3–1)	Nebraska (5–0)	Michigan State (5–1)	Connecticut (4–1)	Connecticut (6–1)	Michigan State (8–3)	Vanderbilt (13–3)	Oklahoma (12–5)	UCLA (14–5)	Virginia (13–4)	Tulane (17–4)	Marquette (19–4)	Marquette (19–6)	Louisville (18–8)	UNLV (21–7)	Iowa (23–9)	19.
20.	Connecticut	Cincinnati (0–0)	UNLV (1–0)	UNLV (2–0)	Connecticut (3–1) т	Nebraska (7–1) т	Vanderbilt (11–1)	Georgetown (8–2)	UCLA (11–4)	Florida State (13–5)	Wake Forest (13–3)	Purdue (13–5)	UMass (17–4)	New Orleans (20–2)	Tulane (20–6)	Tulane (21–7)	Georgia Tech (19–10)	Utah (24–7)	20.
21.	Michigan State	UNLV (0–0)	Nebraska (2–0)	Michigan State (3–1)	Tulane (5–2) т	Cincinnati (4–1) т	UMass (5–2)	Florida State (9–5)	Michigan State (10–3)	Utah (14–2)	Marquette (15–2)	Tulane (16–4)	Virginia (15–5)	Pittsburgh (15–7)	Virginia (16–8)	UMass (20–6)	Purdue (17–9) т	George Washington (21–9)	21.
22.	Nebraska	New Mexico State (3–0)	UMass (1–1)	Louisville (1–2)	UMass (5–2)	California (5–0)	Nebraska (9–3)	Ohio State (9–2)	Florida State (11–5)	Georgetown (11–3)	Georgia Tech (11–5)	Oklahoma (14–7)	Marquette (17–4)	Virginia (16–6)	Oklahoma State (18–5)	Oklahoma State (19–7)	Virginia (19–9) т	UMass (24–7)	22.
23.	UNLV	Connecticut (0–1)	Connecticut (1–1)	UMass (2–2)	Cincinnati (3–1)	UMass (2–2)	Florida State (8–4)	Vanderbilt (11–3)	Pittsburgh (11–2)	UCLA (12–5)	Virginia (12–4)	UMass (15–4)	New Orleans (17–2) т	UMass (18–5)	Purdue (15–8)	Marquette (20–6)	Oklahoma State (19–8)	Xavier (24–6)	23.
24.	Iowa State	Texas (0–0)	Cincinnati (1–0)	Connecticut (3–1)	New Mexico State (5–2)	BYU (7–2)	BYU (8–4)	Minnesota (10–1)	Utah (10–2)	Wisconsin (10–4)	Tulane (15–3)	Georgia Tech (12–6)	Oklahoma (16–7) т	Oklahoma (17–8)	UMass (18–6)	New Mexico State (23–6)	New Mexico State (25–7)	UCLA (22–11)	24.
25.	New Mexico State	Nebraska (0–0)	New Mexico State (4–1)	New Mexico State (5–2)	California (4–0)	Vanderbilt (8–1)	New Mexico State (7–3)	Nebraska (11–3)	Ohio State (9–3)	Xavier (12–2)	Georgetown (12–4)	Louisville (13–5)	Louisville (14–6)	Xavier (18–3)	Louisville (16–8)	Virginia (18–8)	Western Kentucky (24–5)	Minnesota (20–10)	25.
	Preseason	Week 2 Nov. 30	Week 3 Dec. 7	Week 4 Dec. 14	Week 5 Dec. 21	Week 6 Dec. 28	Week 7 Jan. 4	Week 8 Jan. 11	Week 9 Jan. 18	Week 10 Jan. 25	Week 11 Feb. 1	Week 12 Feb. 8	Week 13 Feb. 15	Week 14 Feb. 22	Week 15 Mar. 1	Week 16 Mar. 8	Week 17 Mar. 15	Final Final	
		Dropped: Iowa State (1–1)	Dropped: Memphis State; Texas	None	Dropped: Louisville	Dropped: Tulane; New Mexico State	Dropped: California (5–2)	Dropped: UMass; BYU; New Mexico State	Dropped: Minnesota; Nebraska	Dropped: Michigan State; Ohio State	Dropped: Connecticut; Wisconsin; Xavier	Dropped: UCLA; Georgetown	Dropped: Georgia Tech	Dropped: Louisville	Dropped: Pittsburgh; Oklahoma	Dropped: Xavier (21–4)	Dropped: Tulane; Marquette	Dropped: New Orleans (26–4); UNLV (21–8); Georgia Tech (19–11); Purdue (17–10); Oklahoma State (19–9); New Mexico State (25–8)	
