= Rec Hall =

Field house at Pennsylvania State University

Coordinates: 40.795780°N 77.869399°W

Recreation Building
- Rec Hall
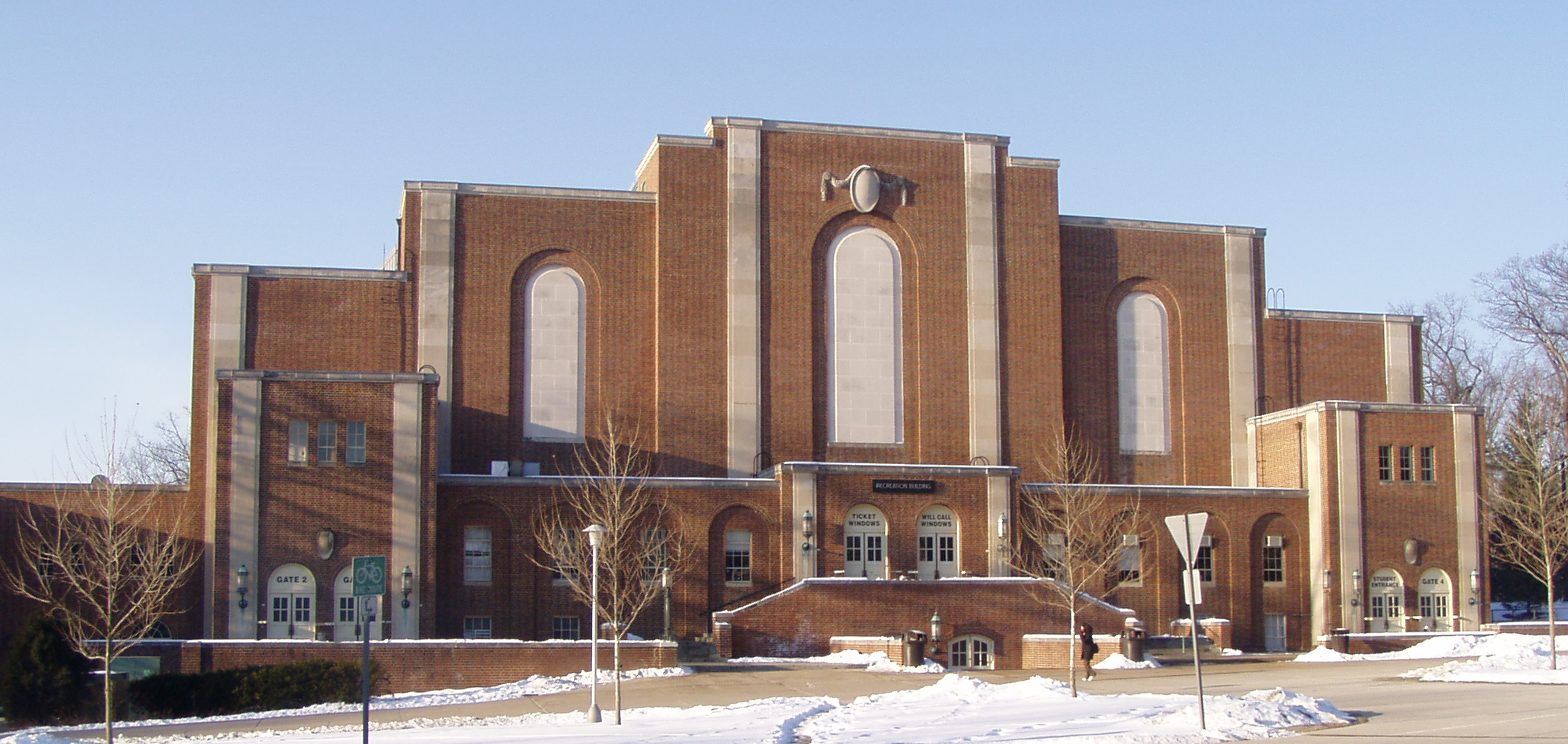
- Rec Hall in 2006.
- Interactive map of Recreation Building
- Location: Curtin Rd; University Park, Pennsylvania, 16802
- Owner: Pennsylvania State University
- Operator: Pennsylvania State University
- Capacity: 6,846 (men's gymnastics, wrestling); 6,469 (women's gymnastics, volleyball)

Construction
- Groundbreaking: 1927
- Opened: January 15, 1929
- Expanded: 1963-64; 1953
- Cost: $572,260
- Architect: Charles Z. Klauder

Tenants
- Penn State Nittany Lions (NCAA); Men's gymnastics (1931–present); Women's gymnastics (1965–present); Women's volleyball (1976–present); Men's volleyball (1977–present); Wrestling (1929–present); Men's basketball (1929–1996, 2013 (One game), 2015 (Two games), 2024 (One game)); Women's basketball (1965–1996, 2024 (One game))

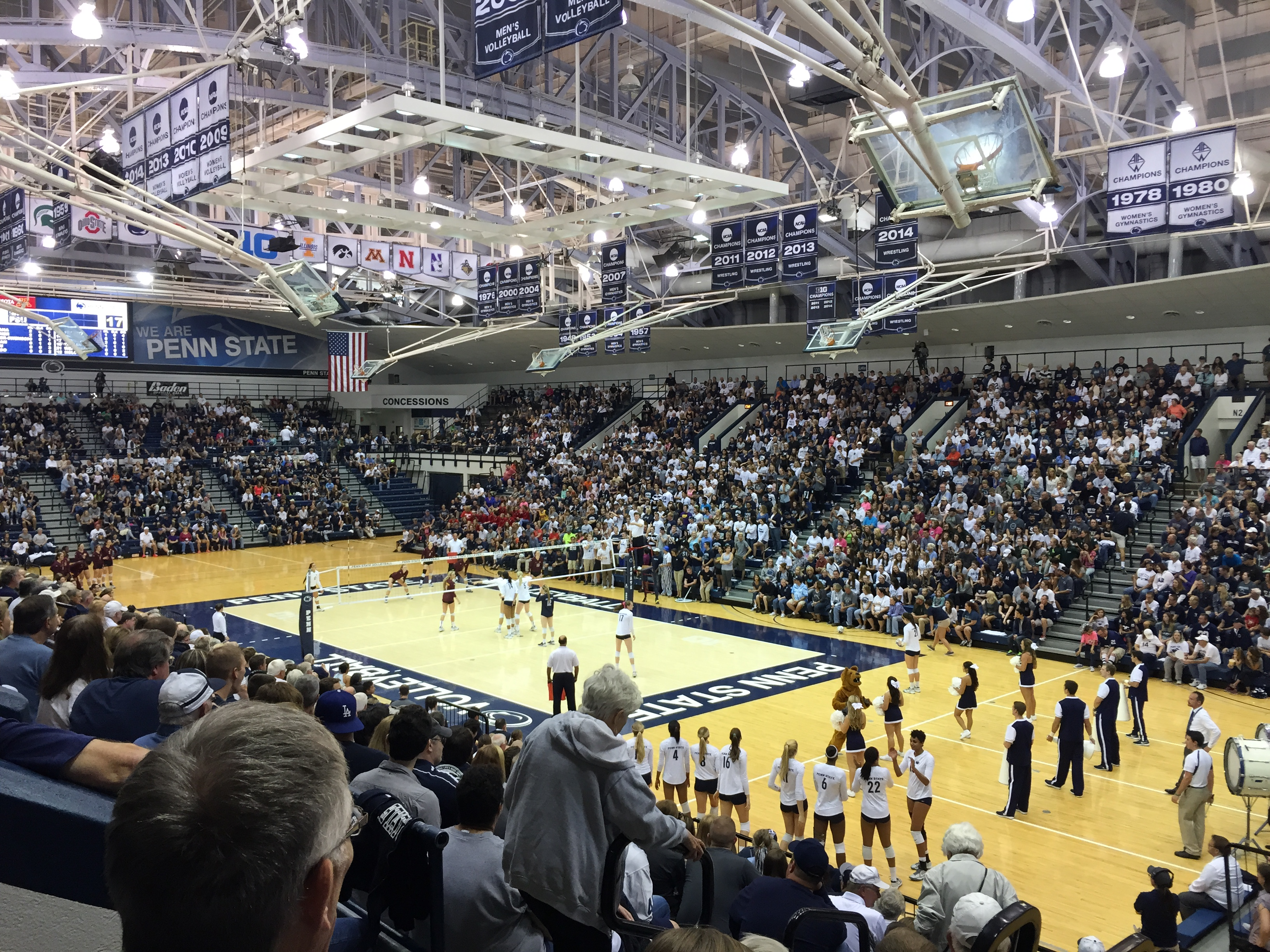
Penn State women's volleyball game at Rec Hall in 2014

Recreation Building, often referred to as Rec Hall, is a field house on the University Park campus of the Pennsylvania State University, within the borough limits of State College. The building was opened on January 15, 1929, and remains in active use. Penn State's gymnastics, volleyball, and wrestling teams compete in Rec Hall. The university's men's and women's basketball teams moved to the Bryce Jordan Center in 1996.

== History ==
=== 20th century ===
Prior to the opening of Rec Hall in 1929, Penn State's indoor sports teams played in a building known as the Armory, which was razed to allow expansion of the Willard Building. The Nittany Lion Shrine is located nearby the building. The Penn State IFC/Panhellenic Dance Marathon, commonly known as THON, was held in Rec Hall from 1999 to 2006, but was subsequently moved to the Bryce Jordan Center.

The architect was Charles Klauder, who designed the University of Pennsylvania's Palestra in Philadelphia. The Georgian design of Rec Hall was chosen to harmonize with other new structures on campus.

Rec Hall has undergone several renovations over its history. In the 1990s, the drop ceiling that was installed in the 1960s was removed, and the building's original roof line was restored, exposing the open steel truss ceiling and upper windows. Along with this, lighting and building acoustics also have been improved.

=== 21st century ===
In 2005, electronic LED scoreboards were installed and lower seating bowl bleachers were replaced. Renovation of Rec Hall's south wing was completed in 2006, including expansion of the student fitness center.

The largest crowd in Rec Hall history, 8,600, witnessed the men's basketball team defeat Virginia 93–68 on December 5, 1973. Three other notable men's games were: a 74–71 loss to Jerry West-led West Virginia Feb. 15, 1958 (WVU had been AP No. 1 for much of the 1957–58 season), the 1991 Atlantic 10 Conference men's basketball tournament championship, won by Penn State, and a double overtime 88–84 loss to No. 1-ranked Indiana, coached by Bob Knight, Feb. 9, 1993. Rec Hall is also known as a classic home court advantage, as the women's volleyball team holds the NCAA volleyball record for home match winning streaks (94), which ranks in the top five of any home court winning streak for any sport, men or women's, and is only outranked by the basketball trio of Kentucky, 1943–55 (129); St. Bonaventure, 1948–61 (99) and UCLA, 1970–76 (98).

Penn State teams have won five national championships in Rec Hall, including in boxing in 1929 and 1932, in wrestling in 1953, and in men's gymnastics in 1960 and 2007.

The men's basketball team has played sporadically in the Rec Hall since leaving, playing once in 2013, twice in 2015, and once in 2024. The women's basketball team returned to the Rec Hall for one game in 2024.
