= List of people from Roanoke, Virginia =

The following is a list of notable people who were either born in, raised in, or were one-time residents of Roanoke, Virginia. Roanoke natives are also referred to as Roanokers.

== Born in Roanoke ==
- Lisa Aliff, pageant winner and actress
- Tony Atlas, wrestler
- Ronde Barber, NFL player
- Tiki Barber, NFL player
- Lynn Bari, actress
- Beth A. Brown, NASA astrophysicist
- George E. Bushnell, Michigan Supreme Court justice
- Challen Cates, actress
- Tai Collins, model and actress
- Ross Copperman, record producer, singer and songwriter
- Troy Daniels, basketball player
- Lew DeWitt, founding tenor and guitarist of the Statler Brothers
- R. H. W. Dillard, poet and author
- Henry H. Fowler, U.S. Secretary of the Treasury
- John Fishwick, railroad executive
- Lily Franklin, member of Virginia House of Delegates from Virginia's 41st district since 2026
- Dorothy Gillespie, artist, sculptor
- Antoinette Hale, painter
- Luke Hancock, basketball player
- Jim Harrell, professional wrestler
- K. J. Hippensteel, tennis player
- James Hylton, racing driver
- Louis A. Johnson, United States Secretary of Defense
- Danny Karbassiyoon, soccer player
- Henrietta Lacks, medical patient
- Tosca Lee, author
- George Lynch, NBA player
- John C. Mather, astrophysicist and Nobel laureate
- John Alan Maxwell, artist
- Walter Muir, International Master of Correspondence Chess
- John Payne, actor
- Don Pullen, jazz pianist
- Billy Sample, MLB player
- John St. Clair, NFL player
- Curtis Staples, basketball player
- Lee Suggs, NFL player
- Nicholas F. Taubman, former United States ambassador to Romania
- Lois Weaver, artist, activist, writer, director, and professor of Contemporary Performance at Queen Mary University of London
- Eric Weinrich, NHL player
- Zach Zimmerman, comedian and author
- Rainey Bethea, the last American criminal to have been publicly executed

== Raised in Roanoke ==
- George Canale, MLB player
- India Ferrah, drag queen
- Kyle Fraser, Survivor contestant
- Diana B. Henriques, financial journalist and author
- Wayne LaPierre, CEO of the National Rifle Association of America
- John McAfee, founder of McAfee
- Wayne Newton, singer
- J. J. Redick, NBA player
- Ross Scott, YouTuber and activist
- Joshua Strachan, musician

== One-time residents ==
- Fleming Alexander, minister, businessman and publisher of the Roanoke Tribune
- Nelson S. Bond, author
- Margaret Wise Brown, author
- Mark David Chapman, murderer of John Lennon
- Sarah Johnson Cocke, writer and civic leader
- Whitney Cummings, comedian and actress
- Annie Dillard, author
- Edward Richard Dudley, lawyer, judge, civil rights activist, and the first African American Ambassador of the United States
- Lester Flatt, musician
- Pearl Fu, longtime leader of the Local Colors festival and namesake of Pearl Fu Plaza
- Nidal Hasan, shooter in the 2009 Fort Hood shooting
- Oliver Hill, civil rights attorney
- Kermit Hunter, playwright
- Johan Kriek, tennis player
- Quigg Lawrence, Anglican bishop
- Samuel W. Martien, Louisiana cotton planter and politician
- Jill McCorkle, author
- Sharyn McCrumb, author
- Oscar Micheaux, early 20th century filmmaker
- John Forbes Nash, mathematician and Nobel laureate
- Harry Penn, dentist and civic rights activist
- John Henry Pinkard, businessman, banker and herb doctor
- Debbie Reynolds
- G. Samantha Rosenthal, historian, author, and academic
- Jane Stuart Smith, soprano, hymnologist, and author
- Lee Smith, author
- Andrew Strelka, attorney
- Henry S. Taylor, poet, academic, and translator
- Curtis Turner, NASCAR driver and Hall of Famer
- Harriet French Turner, folk artist
- Morgan Wade, singer and songwriter
