= Virginia Mr. Basketball =

Honor awarded to high school basketball players

The Virginia Mr. Basketball Award was given to the person chosen as the best high school boys basketball player in the U.S. state of Virginia. The award winner was selected by The Roanoke Times.

== Award winners ==
Year	Player	High School	College	NBA draft
1982	Dell Curry	Fort Defiance	Virginia Tech	1986 NBA draft: 1st round, 15th overall by the Utah Jazz
1983				
1984	Kevin Madden	Robert E. Lee	North Carolina	
1985	Kevin Madden (2)	Robert E. Lee	North Carolina	
1986	J. R. Reid	Kempsville	North Carolina	1989 NBA draft: 1st round, 5th overall by the Charlotte Hornets
1987	Alonzo Mourning	Indian River	Georgetown	1992 NBA draft: 1st round, 2nd overall by the Charlotte Hornets
1988	Alonzo Mourning	Indian River	Georgetown	1992 NBA draft: 1st round, 2nd overall by the Charlotte Hornets
1989	George Lynch	Patrick Henry	North Carolina	1993 NBA draft: 1st round, 12th overall by the Los Angeles Lakers
1990	Grant Hill	South Lakes	Duke	1994 NBA draft: 1st round, 3rd overall by the Detroit Pistons
1991	Cory Alexander	Oak Hill Academy	Virginia	1995 NBA draft: 1st round, 29th overall by the San Antonio Spurs
1992				
1993	Allen Iverson	Bethel High School	Georgetown	1996 NBA draft: 1st round, 1st overall by the Philadelphia 76ers
1994	Curtis Staples	Patrick Henry	Virginia	
1995	Marco Harrison	Petersburg	NC State	
1996	Jason Capel	Indian River	North Carolina	
1997	Brian Demarco Williams	James River	Hagerstown CC; American	
1998	Ronald Curry	Hampton	North Carolina	
1999	Travis Watson	Oak Hill Academy	Virginia	
2000	Cliff Hawkins	Oak Hill Academy	Kentucky	
2001				
2002	JJ Redick	Cave Spring	Duke	2006 NBA draft: 1st round, 11th overall by the Orlando Magic
2003	J. R. Reynolds	Oak Hill Academy	Virginia	
2004	Marquie Cooke	Nansemond River	Virginia Tech	
2005	Marcus Ginyard	Bishop O'Connell	North Carolina	
2006	Vernon Macklin	Hargrave Military Academy	Georgetown; Florida	2011 NBA draft: 2nd round, 52nd overall by the Detroit Pistons
2007	Julian Vaughn	Oak Hill Academy	Florida State; Georgetown	
2008	Ed Davis	Benedictine	North Carolina	2010 NBA draft: 1st round, 13th overall by the Toronto Raptors
2009	Tristan Spurlock	Word of Life Christian	Virginia; UCF	
2010	James Michael McAdoo	Norfolk Christian	North Carolina	
2011	James Michael McAdoo (2)	Norfolk Christian	North Carolina	

== Winners by high school ==
High school	City	Winners
Oak Hill Academy	Mouth of Wilson	5
Indian River	Chesapeake	2
Norfolk Christian	Norfolk	2
Patrick Henry	Roanoke	2
Robert E. Lee	Staunton	2
Benedictine	Richmond	1
Bishop O'Connell	Arlington	1
Cave Spring	Roanoke	1
Fort Defiance	Fort Defiance	1
Hampton	Hampton	1
Hargrave Military Academy	Chatham	1
James River	Midlothian	1
Kempsville	Virginia Beach	1
Nansemond River	Suffolk	1
Petersburg	Petersburg	1
South Lakes	Reston	1
Word of Life Christian	Springfield	1
