= 1991 McDonald's All-American Boys Game =

American high school basketball game

| West | East |
|---|---|
| 108 | 106 |
| | 1st half | 2nd half | Total |
|---|---|---|---|
| West | 49 | 59 | 108 |
| East | 57 | 49 | 106 |
- Date: April 6, 1991
- Venue: Springfield Civic Center, Springfield, MA
- MVP: Chris Webber and Rick Brunson
- Referees: 1; 2; 3
- Attendance: 8,246
- Network: CBS
- Announcers: Greg Gumbel and Billy Packer

McDonald's All-American

The 1991 McDonald's All-American Boys Game was an All-star basketball game played on Saturday, April 6, 1991, at the Springfield Civic Center in Springfield, Massachusetts. The game's rosters featured the best and most highly recruited high school boys graduating in 1991. The game was the 14th annual version of the McDonald's All-American Game first played in 1978.

== 1991 game ==
The game was telecast live by CBS (ABC was the previous telecaster). The rosters were full of talented forwards: the forward position was the most represented among the top ranked recruits of the 1991 class. Only Cory Alexander and Donyell Marshall were still undecided about their college choice. 4 All-Americans of the West team had committed to Michigan and went on to be part of the Fab Five: Howard, King, Rose and Webber. Chris Webber also won the MVP award, along with Rick Brunson. While Brunson showcased his all-around skills by recording 19 points, 7 rebounds and 6 assists, Webber was instrumental in the West comeback in the second half, and gave his team the victory with a slam dunk with 6 seconds left on the game clock. Webber ended the game with 28 points and 12 rebounds. Other players who starred were Glenn Robinson (20 points/8 rebounds), James Forrest (22 and 10), Don Williams (20 points) and Juwan Howard (16). Of the 20 players, 15 went on to play at least 1 game in the NBA.

=== East roster ===
| No. | Name | Height | Weight | Position | Hometown | High school | College of Choice |
|---|---|---|---|---|---|---|---|
| 3 | Travis Best | 5-11 | 182 | G | Springfield, MA, U.S. | Springfield Central | Georgia Tech |
| 10 | Cory Alexander | 6-1 | 180 | G | Mouth of Wilson, VA, U.S. | Oak Hill Academy | Undecided; Committed later to Virginia. |
| 11 | Keith LeGree | 6-1 | 195 | G | Statesboro, GA, U.S. | Statesboro | Louisville |
| 12 | Eric Brunson | 6-3 | 190 | G | Salem, MA, U.S. | Salem | Temple |
| 31 | Ben Davis | 6-9 | 240 | F | Mouth of Wilson, VA, U.S. | Oak Hill Academy | Kansas |
| 32 | James Forrest | 6-8 | 230 | F | Atlanta, GA, U.S. | Southside | Georgia Tech |
| 33 | Donald Williams | 6-3 | 194 | G | Garner, NC, U.S. | Garner | North Carolina |
| 34 | Sharone Wright | 6-10 | 250 | C | Macon, GA, U.S. | Southwest | Clemson |
| 42 | Donyell Marshall | 6-8 | 180 | F | Reading, PA, U.S. | Reading | Undecided; Committed later to Connecticut. |
| 44 | David Vaughn | 6-10 | 240 | F | Whites Creek, TN, U.S. | Whites Creek | Memphis |

=== West roster ===
| No. | Name | Height | Weight | Position | Hometown | High school | College of Choice |
|---|---|---|---|---|---|---|---|
| 12 | Howard Nathan | 5-11 | 170 | G | Peoria, IL, U.S. | Manual | DePaul |
| 13 | Glenn Robinson | 6-9 | 220 | F | Gary, IN, U.S. | Roosevelt | Purdue |
| 14 | Jimmy King | 6-4 | 200 | G | Plano, TX, U.S. | East | Michigan |
| 15 | Calvin Rayford | 5-8 | 165 | G | Milwaukee, WI, U.S. | Washington | Kansas |
| 33 | Chris Webber | 6-9 | 245 | F | Detroit, MI, U.S. | Country Day | Michigan |
| 34 | Tom Kleinschmidt | 6-5 | 200 | F | Chicago, IL, U.S. | Gordon Tech | DePaul |
| 40 | Alan Henderson | 6-9 | 235 | F | Indianapolis, IN, U.S. | Brebeuf Jesuit Prep | Indiana |
| 41 | Jalen Rose | 6-7 | 200 | F | Detroit, MI, U.S. | Southwestern | Michigan |
| 42 | Juwan Howard | 6-10 | 240 | F | Chicago, IL, U.S. | Chicago Vocational | Michigan |
| 44 | Cherokee Parks | 6-11 | 235 | C | Huntington Beach, CA, U.S. | Marina | Duke |

=== Coaches ===
The East team was coached by:

- Head Coach Ray Mullis of The Cardinal Gibbons School (Baltimore, Maryland)

The West team was coached by:

- Head Coach Frank LaPorte of St. Joseph Notre Dame High School (Alameda, California)

== All-American Week ==
=== Contest winners ===
- The 1991 Slam Dunk contest was won by Jimmy King.
- The 1991 3-point shoot-out was won by Sharone Wright.
