= 1993 NCAA Division I men's basketball championship game =

American college basketball final

1993 NCAA Tournament Championship Game
National championship game
Michigan Wolverines	North Carolina Tar Heels
Big Ten	ACC
(31-4 (Note: In the wake of the basketball scandal that was resolved in 2002, Michigan self-imposed a punishment that included vacating their wins from the 1992-93 season. This altered their overall record from 31-5 to 0-4.))	(33–4)
71	77
Head coach: Steve Fisher	Head coach: Dean Smith
- AP: 3
- Coaches: 2
- AP: 4
- Coaches: 1
	1st half	2nd half	Total
Michigan Wolverines	36	35	71
North Carolina Tar Heels	42	35	77
- Date: April 5, 1993
- Venue: Louisiana Superdome, New Orleans, Louisiana
- MVP: Donald Williams, North Carolina
- Favorite: North Carolina by 2.5
- Referees: Tom Harrington, Ed Hightower, & Jim Stupin
- Attendance: 64,151

United States TV coverage
- Network: CBS
- Announcers: Jim Nantz and Billy Packer

The 1993 NCAA Division I men's basketball championship game took place on April 5, 1993, between the North Carolina Tar Heels and Michigan Wolverines at the Louisiana Superdome in New Orleans, Louisiana. The match-up was the final one of the fifty-fifth consecutive NCAA Men's Division I Basketball Championship single-elimination tournament — commonly referred to as the NCAA Tournament — organized by the National Collegiate Athletic Association (NCAA) and is used to crown a national champion for men's basketball at the Division I level.

The Tar Heels defeated the Fab Five-led Wolverines and won their third national championship, after having been victorious in 1957 and 1982 beforehand. Donald Williams was named the NCAA basketball tournament Most Outstanding Player for his efforts throughout the tournament. This was the third straight national championship won by the ACC.

Michigan was later forced to vacate its appearance in the title game due to Chris Webber being ruled ineligible as a result of the University of Michigan basketball scandal. This would be Michigan's last appearance in the championship game until 2013.

== Background ==
=== Michigan Wolverines ===
- West
  - (1) Michigan 84, (16) Coastal Carolina 53
  - (1) Michigan 86, (9) UCLA 84 (OT)
  - (1) Michigan 72, (12) George Washington 64
  - (1) Michigan 77, (7) Temple 72
- Final Four
  - (W1) Michigan 81, (SE1) Kentucky 78 (OT)

=== North Carolina Tar Heels ===
- East
  - (1) North Carolina 85, (16) East Carolina 65
  - (1) North Carolina 112, (8) Rhode Island 67
  - (1) North Carolina 80, (4) Arkansas 74
  - (1) North Carolina 75, (2) Cincinnati 68 (OT)
- Final Four
  - (E1) North Carolina 78, (MW2) Kansas 68

=== Team rosters ===
1992-93 Michigan Wolverines roster
No.	Name	Position	Height	Weight	Class
3	Rob Pelinka	G	6-6	200	Sr.
4	Chris Webber	F	6-9	245	So.
5	Jalen Rose	G	6-8	208	So.
11	Dugan Fife	G	6-2	170	Fr.
14	Michael Talley	G	6-1	197	Sr.
21	Ray Jackson	F	6-6	219	So.
22	Jason Bossard	G	6-4	204	Jr.
23	Sean Dobbins	G	6-1	178	So.
24	Jimmy King	G	6-5	201	So.
25	Juwan Howard	F/C	6-9	240	So.
32	James Voskuil	F	6-8	204	Sr.
41	Leon Derricks	C	6-9	190	Fr.
42	Eric Riley	C	7-0	245	Sr.

1992-93 North Carolina Tar Heels roster
No.	Name	Position	Height	Weight	Class
00	Eric Montross	C	7-0	270	Jr.
3	Pat Sullivan	F	6-8	216	Jr.
4	Larry Davis	G	6-3	184	Fr.
5	Henrik Rödl	F	6-8	203	Sr.
11	Scott Cherry	G/F	6-5	180	Sr.
14	Derrick Phelps	G	6-3	181	Jr.
21	Donald Williams	G	6-3	194	So.
24	Dante Calabria	G	6-4	186	Fr.
31	Brian Reese	F	6-6	215	Jr.
33	Kevin Salvadori	F/C	7-0	224	Jr.
34	George Lynch	F	6-8	220	Sr.
35	Travis Stephenson	F	6-7	220	Sr.
40	Ed Geth	F	6-9	250	Sr.
45	Serge Zwikker	C	7-1	245	Fr.
55	Matt Wenstrom	C	7-1	260	Sr.

== Overview ==
Michigan and North Carolina were portrayed as different playing styles, with Michigan having an "NBA–style" roster and UNC having "the model college system." Kansas center Eric Pauley, who played both teams, stated that Michigan was "really athletic," while North Carolina was "fundamentally sound." In addition, Michigan was known for allowing freshmen to get significant playing time, while also allowing their players to be more "flamboyant" and expressive. With respect to the sophomores on the Michigan roster, coach Smith said he was "amazed at what they had done" and mentioned how they had been to two Final Fours in as many years, further stating "that's a lifetime." The Tar Heels, on the other hand, were known for being a program where upperclassmen get more of the publicity and playing time. Montross commented on North Carolina's perception and related it to how Dean Smith "won't settle for anything but the image he has," while referencing their clean shaven appearance, proper dress attire when traveling and going to dinners, and their "[doing] everything just right.

Dean Smith, who had only one national championship to his credit from 1982, was viewed to have needed the game for his legacy as it would "shut up" critics. In addition, it would bring the Tar Heels to the forefront after Duke having won the previous two national championships. Meanwhile, Steve Fisher, was thought to have needed to win the title in order to vindicate to critics that he "can coach." He had previously won a national title in 1989 when he gained control of Michigan's team before the start of the NCAA Tournament. In advance of the game Smith spoke of Wolverines saying "They're quick, and Coach Fisher has done a great job getting the ball inside. They know how to pass and catch it."

As the two teams met in December in the Rainbow Classic, most media commented on the game and influenced their expectations. It was noted that the game would be different as Michigan's Jackson would be expected to play more than the minute he did in December before he left the game with a dislocated shoulder. Coach Smith felt Michigan relied on Jackson defensively and noted that he has been doing well on offense as of late. Mark Rosner of Austin American–Statesman wrote that North Carolina was performing much better on offense than they were in that December matchup.

Writers noted that Howard, Eric Reilly, and Webber would likely rotate on the seven–footer Montross, but Webber has the "brawn" to go against Montross. In regards to facing off and defending Montross, Webber stated "I'm not afraid of anyone." Montross spoke of Webber and his matchup saying that "Blocking shots is going to happen. He's got me. I got him." Rose was thought to have a great performance as he would need to minimize his turnovers.

== Game summary ==
CBS

April 5, 1993
9:22 pm EST

#W1 ~~Michigan Wolverines~~ 71, #E1 North Carolina Tar Heels 77
Scoring by half: 42-36, 35-35
Pts: Chris Webber 23; Rebs: Chris Webber 11; Asts: Jimmy King & Jalen Rose 4	Pts: Donald Williams 25; Rebs: George Lynch 10; Asts: Derrick Phelps 6

Louisiana Superdome, New Orleans, Louisiana
Attendance: 64,151
Referees: Tom Harrington, Ed Hightower, & Jim Stupin

Starters:			Pts	Reb	Ast
G	14	Derrick Phelps	9	3	6
G	21	Donald Williams	25	1	1
C	00	Eric Montross	16	5	0
F	34	George Lynch	12	10	1
F	31	Brian Reese	8	5	3
Reserves:					
F/C	33	Kevin Salvadori	2	4	1
F	3	Pat Sullivan	3	1	1
F	5	Henrik Rödl	2	0	0
C	50	Matt Wenstrom	0	0	0
G	24	Dante Calabria	0	0	0
G/F	11	Scott Cherry	0	0	0
Head coach:
Dean Smith

North Carolina	Michigan

North Carolina	Statistics	Michigan
27/55 (49%)	Field goals	30/62 (48%)
5/11 (45%)	3-pt. field goals	5/15 (33%)
18/23 (78%)	Free throws	6/7 (86%)
10	Offensive rebounds	13
19	Defensive rebounds	18
29	Total rebounds	31
13	Assists	17
10	Turnovers	14
7	Steals	4
4	Blocks	4
10	Fouls	18

Starters:			Pts	Reb	Ast
G	5	Jalen Rose	12	1	4
G	24	Jimmy King	15	6	4
C	25	Juwan Howard	7	7	3
F	4	Chris Webber	23	11	1
F	21	Ray Jackson	6	1	1
Reserves:					
G	3	Rob Pelinka	6	2	1
F/C	43	Eric Riley	2	3	1
G	14	Michael Talley	0	0	1
F	32	James Voskuil	0	0	1
Head coach:
Steve Fisher

Legend
Pos	Position	FGM	Field goals made	FGA	Field goals attempted	FTM	Free throws made	FTA	Free throws attempted	Reb	Rebounds
Ast	Assists	Blk	Blocks	Stl	Steals	PF	Personal fouls	Pts	Points

Michigan Wolverines
Player	Pos	FGM	FGA	3PtM	3PtA	FTM	FTA	Reb	Ast	Blk	Stl	PF	Pts
Juwan Howard	F/C	3	8	0	0	1	1	7	3	0	0	3	7
Ray Jackson	F	2	3	0	0	2	2	1	1	1	1	5	6
Jimmy King	G	6	13	1	5	2	2	6	4	0	1	2	15
Rob Pelinka	G	2	4	2	3	0	0	2	1	0	0	1	6
Eric Riley	C	1	3	0	0	0	0	3	1	0	1	1	2
Jalen Rose	G	5	12	2	6	0	0	1	4	0	0	3	12
Michael Talley	G	0	0	0	0	0	0	0	1	0	0	1	0
James Voskuil	F	0	0	0	0	0	0	0	1	0	0	0	0
Chris Webber	F	11	18	0	1	1	2	11	1	3	1	2	23
Team totals		30	62	5	15	6	7	33	17	4	4	18	71

North Carolina Tar Heels
Player	Pos	FGM	FGA	3PtM	3PtA	FTM	FTA	Reb	Ast	Blk	Stl	PF	Pts
George Lynch	F	6	12	0	0	0	0	10	1	2	1	3	12
Eric Montross	C	5	11	0	0	6	9	5	0	1	0	2	16
Derrick Phelps	G	4	6	0	1	1	2	3	6	0	3	0	9
Brian Reese	F	2	7	0	1	4	4	5	3	0	0	1	8
Henrik Rödl	F	1	4	0	2	0	0	0	0	0	2	0	2
Kevin Salvadori	F/C	0	0	0	0	2	2	4	1	1	0	1	2
Pat Sullivan	F	1	2	0	0	1	2	1	1	0	0	1	3
Matt Wenstrom	C	0	1	0	0	0	0	0	0	0	0	0	0
Donald Williams	G	8	12	5	7	4	4	1	1	0	1	1	25
Team totals		27	55	5	11	18	23	29	13	4	7	10	77

=== Final minute ===
The last 58 seconds of the game became one of the most famous moments in tournament history. After Eric Montross slammed the ball through the net to cap a 9–0 North Carolina run, Michigan got a basket from Ray Jackson on its next possession. With 46 seconds left, Michigan called its final timeout. The Tar Heels then turned the ball over attempting to inbound it, giving Michigan another possession. Jalen Rose missed a game tying three pointer, but Chris Webber scored on a putback to bring the Wolverines to 72–71.

Needing to extend the game, Michigan fouled Pat Sullivan on the next possession and sent him to the free throw line for the front end of a one-and-one. Sullivan converted, extending the North Carolina lead to two. However, he was unable to hit the second free throw, and Webber grabbed the rebound. There were 19 seconds on the clock when he took possession.

Initially, all of the other Wolverines went back upcourt and Webber froze. Rose would eventually come back toward him to give Webber a potential passing option, but he was closely guarded. Webber thought about passing but pulled the basketball back at the last second. In doing so, however, he inadvertently took a step without picking up his dribble, which should have resulted in Webber being called for traveling and the ball going back to North Carolina. The only referee who was close enough to clearly see the play had been running up the court instead of staying in the backcourt where he belonged, and his eyes were on the floor ahead of him which is why he didn't see Webber's blatant travel and made no call as the UNC bench began jumping up and down and screaming in outrage.

Webber then picked up his dribble and sprinted upcourt, but he ran into North Carolina's half-court trap and ended up in the corner near the Michigan bench where he was unable to pass the ball without turning it over, and in danger of stepping out of bounds. In what many observers would later term a "panic", Webber turned his arms and signaled for a timeout from the nearest referee, who granted it. However, Webber wasn't aware that the Wolverines were out of timeouts, and under the penalty rules for an illegal timeout, Michigan was assessed a technical foul; this resulted in the Tar Heels receiving two uncontested free throws, which they successfully converted, and possession of the ball. North Carolina added two more points from the free throw line on the ensuing possession, rounding out the scoring at 77-71 and giving them their first national championship since 1982.

== Aftermath ==
Michigan would later vacate its appearance in both the 1992 and 1993 Final Four and their subsequent title games due to sanctions involving the eligibility of Chris Webber in the Ed Martin scandal. While the other members of the Fab Five were cleared of any wrongdoing, the group's reputation was nonetheless tarnished by the scandal. As a result of the scandal, Michigan entered a slump during the 2000s and would not return to the Final Four until 2013. They would also return to the championship game in 2013 as well, where they lost to Louisville (the Cardinals, ironically, would vacate their title due to a major scandal). This was the second of four straight title game defeats for the Wolverines. The losing streak would eventually come to an end in 2026, as Michigan defeated UConn to win their second championship.

North Carolina would not return to the national championship game until 2005, where they defeated another Big Ten team in Illinois to win their fourth championship.
