= Howellville =

Howellville may refer to:

- Howellville, Pennsylvania
- Howellville, Texas
