= Wenstrom =

Wenstrom or Wenström is a surname. Notable people with the surname include:

- Frank A. Wenstrom (1903–1997), American politician
- Harold Wenstrom (1893–1944), American cinematographer
- Jonas Wenström (1855–1893), Swedish engineer and inventor
- Matt Wenstrom (born 1970), American basketball player
