= Cliff Hawkins (basketball) =

American basketball player

Personal information
- Born: November 24, 1981 (age 44) Alexandria, Virginia, U.S.
- Listed height: 6 ft 1 in (1.85 m)
- Listed weight: 190 lb (86 kg)

Career information
- High school: Potomac (Dumfries, Virginia); Oak Hill Academy (Mouth of Wilson, Virginia)
- College: Kentucky (2000–2004)
- NBA draft: 2004: undrafted
- Playing career: 2004–2012
- Position: Point guard

Career history
- 2004: JuveCaserta
- 2004–2005: Yakima Sun Kings
- 2005: Dodge City Legend
- 2005: Clermont-Ferrand
- 2005–2006: Fayetteville Patriots
- 2006: Cedevita Junior
- 2006–2007: Selçuk Üniversitesi
- 2007–2008: OSG Phoenix
- 2008–2009: Bank BPS Kwidzyn
- 2009–2010: Trefl Sopot
- 2010: AEL Limassol
- 2010–2011: PBG Poznań
- 2011–2012: Armia Tbilisi
- 2012: APOEL

Career highlights
- JBL assists leader (2008); JBL steals leader (2008); USBL champion (2005); Third-team All-SEC – AP (2004); Fourth-team Parade All-American (2000); Virginia Mr. Basketball (2000)

Clifton Hawkins (born November 24, 1981) is an American former professional basketball player. He started his high school career at Potomac High School in Dumfries, Virginia, and transferred to Oak Hill Academy in Mouth of Wilson in his junior year, winning the Virginia Mr. Basketball award in his senior season in 2000. He then signed to play college basketball at Kentucky, where he stayed 4 years, advancing to the NCAA tournament Sweet Sixteen in 2001 and 2002 and to the Elite Eight in 2003. In 2004, his senior year at Kentucky, he was an all-conference selection. After going undrafted in the 2004 NBA draft Hawkins started his professional career in Italy with LegaDue team JuveCaserta. He has played in Italy, France, Croatia, Turkey, Japan, Poland, Cyprus and Georgia in his 8-year professional career.

== High school career ==
Hawkins was born in Alexandria, Virginia, to Ricky Hunter and Monique Wilhite. A left-handed guard, he attended Potomac High School in Dumfries, where he was named in the Virginia All-AAA Second Team by the Washington Post. Hawkins' sophomore year saw him averaging 19.3 points, 4.3 rebounds and 4.2 steals per game, shooting 58% from the field, and was named in the All-Met team selected by the Washington Post, the first sophomore to receive a selection in an All-Met team. In the state semifinal against Hampton High School, Hawkins scored 31 points, and on the defensive side held All-American Ronald Curry to 6 points. Potomac reached the championship game, where they were defeated by George Washington High School of Danville. The Washington Post defined Hawkins the state's top sophomore, and he was a first-team Class AAA All-State selection.

In July 1998, the summer before his junior year, Hawkins participated in the ABCD Camp, a camp for the best high school players in the United States. Hawkins decided to transfer to Oak Hill Academy in Mouth of Wilson for his junior year; Oak Hill coach Steve Smith praised his all-around playing style, and particularly his on-ball defense skills. In his first season with the Warriors, he was the only non-senior player to be in the starting lineup, playing at shooting guard; he averaged 11.7 points, 2.3 rebounds, 5.4 assists and 3.9 steals (the best mark in the country), shooting 50% from thie field (30% from three) and 62.5% from the free throw line. He established a new Oak Hill record for steals in a single season with 120. In July 1999 Hawkins participated in the ABCD Camp for the second time in his career. Coach Smith moved Hawkins to point guard for his senior year, and Hawkins averaged a double double with 10.1 points and 12.5 assists per game: his 400 total assists were a new record for Oak Hill, as were his 167 steals (5.4 per game), which surpassed his own record of 120 established in the previous season. He also averaged 3.6 rebounds and shot 48% from the field and 66.7% from the free throw line. At the end of the season, Hawkins was named Oak Hill's Most Valuable Player and was named Virginia Mr. Basketball by the Roanoke Times.

Hawkins was one of the top players in the country as a senior; scout Bob Gibbons compared him to Kentucky guard Wayne Turner, and he was ranked in the top 50 by several recruiting services. He was the 36th best player overall according to the Recruiting Services Consensus Index (RSCI), while Hoop Scoop ranked him 84th.

== College career ==
Hawkins was recruited by many NCAA Division I schools: he had originally committed to play at New Mexico, but later signed with Kentucky in mid-November 1999, knowing that the program needed a point guard after the graduation of Wayne Turner. Hawkins decided to wear jersey number 1 for the Wildcats, and played 33 out of 34 possible games in his freshman year (11 minutes per game), being used as a reserve by head coach Tubby Smith. Hawkins scored his first points on November 21, 2000, against Jacksonville State, and also recorded 4 steals in 15 minutes in that game. He scored a season-high 11 points against North Carolina on December 2, 2000, and he had 7 assists against LSU on February 21, 2001. In the 2001 NCAA tournament Hawkins and the Wildcats reached the Sweet Sixteen, where they were eliminated by USC.

In his sophomore year, Hawkins saw increased playing time when coach Smith promoted him to a starting role. He started his first game against Western Kentucky on November 15, 2001, and December 18, 2001, he scored 15 points against Duke in an overtime loss; on December 22 he scored a career high 17 points against Indiana. On January 5, 2002, he recorded a career high in assists with 10 against Mississippi State, and one week later he scored a game winner against South Carolina. In the 2002 NCAA tournament Hawkins started all the games and averaged 6.3 points, 4.3 rebounds and 4.7 assists: the Wildcats were eliminated by Maryland in the Sweet Sixteen.

Hawkins had academic issues at the beginning of his junior year, and missed the first 7 games; he also lost his starting role in the lineup, and only started 1 game out of 29 appearances. Coach Smith used Hawkins as a sixth man and the guard had his best year in shooting, posting career highs in three-point field goal percentage (38.1%) and free throw percentage (74.7%). Hawkins reappeared on the court on December 21 against Indiana after missing the first games of the year, and scored 4 points and had 5 rebounds and 5 assists in 26 minutes of play. He then scored 14 points (a season high) on February 23, 2003, against Mississippi State, and he posted 9 assists in the SEC tournament win against Vanderbilt. In the 2003 NCAA tournament Hawkins debuted with 13 points and 6 assists in 22 minutes against IUPUI (2/3 from the three-point line), followed by another 13-point performance against Utah. He then scored 4 points (with 4 steals) against Wisconsin, and in the loss against Marquette he had 9 points, 2 rebounds and 3 assists in 27 minutes. At the end of the season he was an Honorable mention AP All-SEC selection, and he led his team in assists (3.8) and steals per game (1.4).

Hawkins gained back his starting assignments in his senior year, and he started at point guard all of his 32 appearances. Hawkins recorded career highs in all statistical categories with 30.6 minutes, 10.3 points, 2.9 rebounds, 5.2 assists, and 2.3 steals per game. He led the SEC in assists per game and total steals, while he was second in steals per game. During the 2004 NCAA tournament Hawkins debuted with 14 points and 4 assists against Florida A&M, and ended his career at Kentucky with 9 points, 2 rebounds, 2 assists and 2 steals in 26 minutes in the loss against UAB. At the end of the season he was named in the All-SEC Third Team by the Associated Press. Hawkins scored a total of 839 points for the Wildcats, and ranks 7th all-time in total assists with 468, and 3rd in total steals with 199.

=== College statistics ===
Year	Team	GP	GS	MPG	FG%	3P%	FT%	RPG	APG	SPG	BPG	PPG
2000–01	Kentucky	33	0	11.0	.390	.231	.594	1.1	1.6	1.0	0.0	3.0
2001–02	Kentucky	32	29	25.8	.393	.311	.605	2.6	4.3	1.5	0.0	7.1
2002–03	Kentucky	29	1	21.9	.412	.381	.747	2.2	3.8	1.4	0.2	6.3
2003–04	Kentucky	32	32	30.6	.425	.337	.710	2.9	5.2	2.3	0.3	10.3
Career		126	62	22.3	.408	.332	.678	2.2	3.7	1.6	0.1	6.7

== Professional career ==
After the end of his senior season at Kentucky, Hawkins was automatically eligible for the 2004 NBA draft, but he was not selected by an NBA franchise. In July 2004 Hawkins signed with JuveCaserta in Italy: in 4 LegaDue games he averaged 8.5 points, 1.8 rebounds 2.3 assists, and 3 steals per game in 30.3 minutes of playing time. He then left the team and joined the Yakima Sun Kings of the Continental Basketball Association. He played 27 games (11 starts) in the 2004–05 CBA season, averaging 12 points, 3.6 rebounds and 6.1 assists in 29.4 minutes per game. In spring-summer 2005 Hawkins participated in the 2005 United States Basketball League (USBL) season with the Dodge City Legend, winning the league title. In July he joined the New Jersey Nets for the Las Vegas NBA Summer League, where he played 5 games (4 starts) averaging 4.8 points, 1.4 rebounds and 1.2 assists per game.

After a brief experience with Clermont-Ferrand in France, Hawkins joined the Fayetteville Patriots of the NBA Development League, and in the 2005–06 season he started in 9 out of his 14 appearances, averaging 9.5 points, 2.1 rebounds and 6.1 assists per game. Later that season he joined Cedevita, a team of the Croatian league, and in 14 games he averaged 10.9 points and 3.4 assists. He then spent the 2006–07 season in Turkey with Selçuk Üniversitesi, and over 11 games in the Turkish Basketball League he posted averages of 11.5 points, 3.5 rebounds and 4.9 assists per game on 32.4 minutes of playing time.

Hawkins moved to Japan in 2007 and signed a contract with OSG Phoenix of the Japan Basketball League. In the 2007–08 season he led the league in assists (7.5) and steals per game (2.3). He then went back to Europe and signed with Polish PLK team Bank BPS Kwidzyn, and in his first season in Poland he averaged 6.9 points, 2.2 rebounds, 3.4 assists and 1.9 steals per game. He then joined another PLK team, Trefl Sopot, which were playing their inaugural season. He was a full-time starter with the new team, and averaged 10.3 points, 3.8 assists and 1.8 steals per game in 36 appearances.

After briefly playing for AEL Limassol in Cyprus, Hawkins spent the 2010–11 season back in Poland, this time with PBG Poznań where he posted averages of 6.8 points, 3 rebounds and 4 assists over 25 games. In 2011 he moved to another European country, Georgia, and signed with BC Armia of Tbilisi. He had the chance to make his debut at international level with the new team, playing 2 games during the 2011–12 FIBA EuroChallenge. Hawkins retired in 2012 after playing for APOEL in Cyprus.
