= 1989 McDonald's All-American Boys Game =

American high school basketball game

West	East
112	103
	1st half	2nd half	Total
West	52	60	112
East	47	56	103
- Date: April 23, 1989
- Venue: Kemper Arena, Kansas City, MO
- MVP: Shaquille O'Neal and Bobby Hurley
- Referees: 1 Ron Zetcher; 2 J. C. Leimbach; 3
- Attendance: 9,419
- Network: ABC
- Announcers: Gary Bender and Dick Vitale

McDonald's All-American

The 1989 McDonald's All-American Boys Game was an All-star basketball game played on Sunday, April 23, 1989 at Kemper Arena in Kansas City, Missouri. The game's rosters featured the best and most highly recruited high school boys graduating in 1989. The game was the 12th annual version of the McDonald's All-American Game first played in 1978.

== 1989 game ==
The game was telecast live by ABC. The West was led by Shaquille O'Neal, the top ranked center of his class, while the East had forward Doug Edwards and guard Bobby Hurley. Guard Kenny Anderson was unable to participate due to a sprained left ankle. The game saw O'Neal record a double-double with 18 points and 16 rebounds; he also had 6 blocks. Hurley recorded 10 assists, the highest number of assists recorded in a McDonald's game up to that point, and won co-MVP along with O'Neal. Other good performances were those of Billy McCaffrey (16 points), George Lynch (12), Allan Houston (14) and Tracy Murray (14). Of the 25 players, 13 went on to play at least 1 game in the NBA.

=== East roster ===
No.	Name	Height	Weight	Position	Hometown	High school	College of Choice
10	Billy McCaffrey	6-3	175	G	Allentown, PA, U.S.	Central Catholic	Duke
12	Kenny Anderson	6-0	170	G	Jamaica, NY, U.S.	Archbishop Molloy	Georgia Tech
13	Shaun Golden	6-3	180	G	Greer, SC, U.S.	Riverside	Georgia
14	Bobby Hurley	6-0	165	G	Jersey City, NJ, U.S.	St. Anthony	Duke
22	Jim Jackson	6-5	218	G	Toledo, OH, U.S.	Macomber-Whitney Vocational	Ohio State
31	Doug Edwards	6-9	205	F	Miami, FL, U.S.	Miami Senior	Undecided
32	Michael Tate	6-4	210	F	Oxon Hill, MD, U.S.	Oxon Hill	Georgetown
33	Conrad McRae	6-9	220	C	Brooklyn, NY, U.S.	Brooklyn Technical	Syracuse
34	George Lynch	6-8	205	F	Roanoke, VA, U.S.	Flint Hill Prep	Undecided
35	Jamal Faulkner	6-7	200	F	Middle Village, NY, U.S.	Christ the King	Pitt
44	Arron Bain	6-7	195	F	Falls Church, VA, U.S.	Flint Hill Prep	Villanova
54	Darryl Barnes	6-8	202	F	Brooklyn, NY, U.S.	Franklin K. Lane	Georgia Tech
55	Anthony Douglas	6-7	245	C	Memphis, TN, U.S.	East	Memphis State

=== West roster ===
No.	Name	Height	Weight	Position	Hometown	High school	College of Choice
20	Greg Graham	6-3	174	G	Indianapolis, IN, U.S.	Warren Central	Indiana
21	Allan Houston	6-5	178	G	Louisville, KY, U.S.	Ballard	Tennessee
22	Pat Graham	6-6	205	G	New Albany, IN, U.S.	Floyd Central	Indiana
23	Mitchell Butler	6-5	200	G	North Hollywood, CA, U.S.	Oakwood	UCLA
24	James Robinson	6-2	180	G	Jackson, MS, U.S.	Murrah	Alabama
30	Tracy Murray	6-7	220	F	Glendora, CA, U.S.	Glendora	UCLA
31	Deryl Cunningham	6-7	200	F	Westchester, IL, U.S.	St. Joseph	DePaul
32	Jeff Webster	6-7	210	F	Midwest City, OK, U.S.	Carl Albert	Oklahoma
33	Shaquille O'Neal	6-11	240	C	San Antonio, TX, U.S.	Robert G. Cole	LSU
44	Calvin Byrd	6-5	195	G	Alameda, CA, U.S.	St. Joseph Notre Dame	Villanova
50	Deon Thomas	6-9	200	F	Chicago, IL, U.S.	Simeon	Undecided
55	Matt Wenstrom	7-0	251	C	Houston, TX, U.S.	Mayde Creek	North Carolina

=== Coaches ===
The East team was coached by:

- Head Coach Walter Van Huss of Dobyns-Bennett High School (Kingsport, Tennessee)

The West team was coached by:

- Head Coach Tom Orlich of South Tahoe High School (Lake Tahoe, California)

== All-American Week ==
=== Contest winners ===
- The 1989 Slam Dunk contest was won by James Robinson.
- The 1989 3-point shoot-out was won by Pat Graham.
