= Roanoke High School =

Roanoke High School could refer to:

- Roanoke High School (Illinois) — a public school in Roanoke, Woodford County, Illinois, also known as Roanoke Victory High School or Roanoke Township High School, and consolidated with Benson High School in 1957 to form Roanoke-Benson High School
- Roanoke High School (Indiana) — a school in Roanoke, Huntington County, Indiana
- Roanoke High School (North Carolina) — a public school in Robersonville, Martin County, North Carolina, consolidated with Bear Grass High School in 2010 to form South Creek High School
- Roanoke High School (Virginia) - a public school in Roanoke, Virginia, open from 1898 to 1924
