= Cory Alexander =

American basketball player (born 1973)

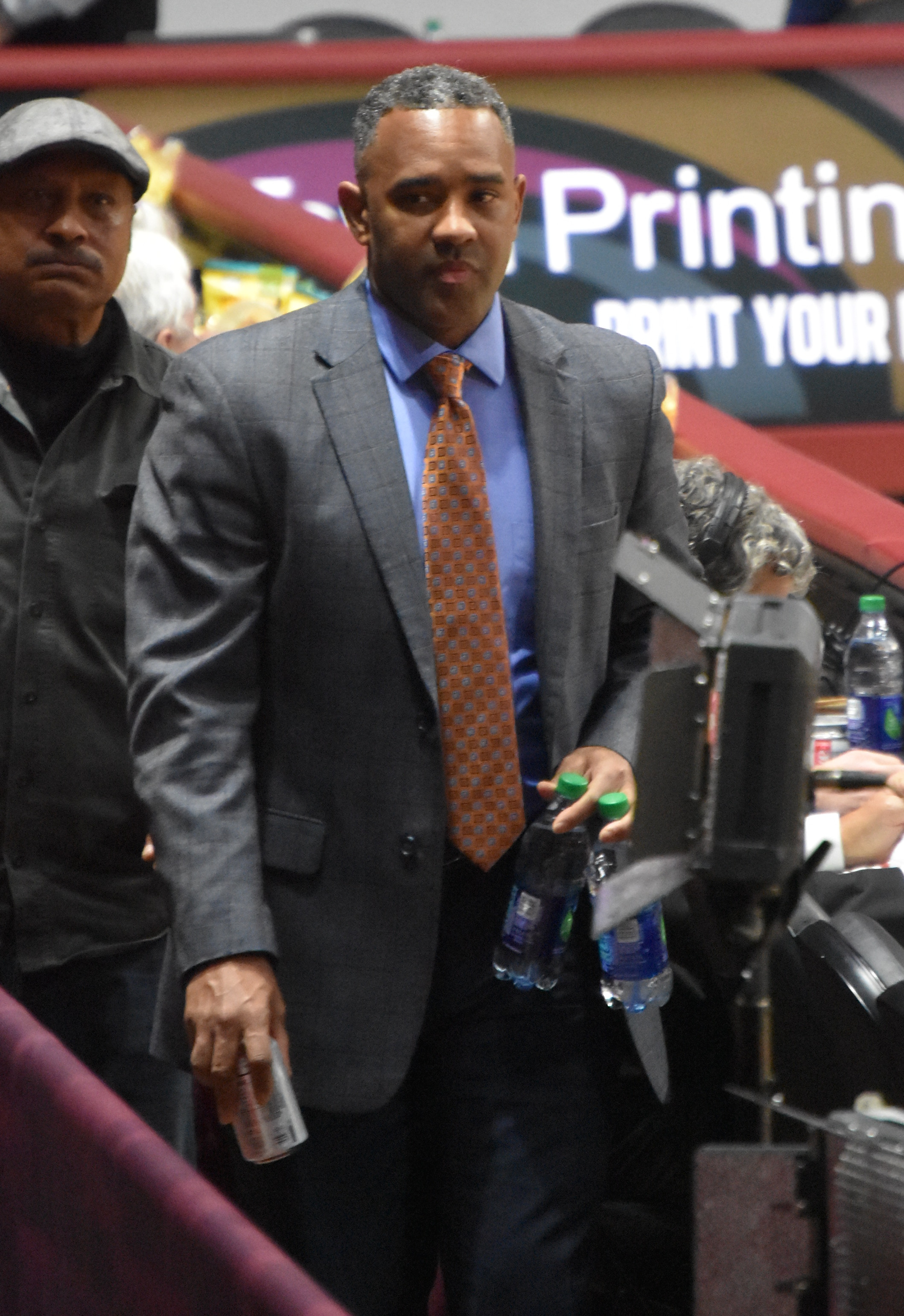
- Alexander in 2020

Personal information
- Born: June 22, 1973 (age 53) Waynesboro, Virginia, U.S.
- Listed height: 6 ft 1 in (1.85 m)
- Listed weight: 185 lb (84 kg)

Career information
- High school: Waynesboro (Waynesboro, Virginia); Flint Hill (Oakton, Virginia); Oak Hill Academy (Mouth of Wilson, Virginia)
- College: Virginia (1991–1995)
- NBA draft: 1995: 1st round, 29th overall pick
- Drafted by: San Antonio Spurs
- Playing career: 1995–2005
- Position: Point guard
- Number: 1, 7, 2, 12

Career history
- 1995–1998: San Antonio Spurs
- 1998–2000: Denver Nuggets
- 2001: Orlando Magic
- 2002–2003: Roanoke Dazzle
- 2003–2004: Virtus Roma
- 2004–2005: Roanoke Dazzle
- 2005: Charlotte Bobcats

Career highlights
- All-NBDL First Team (2005); All-NBDL Second Team (2003); Second-team All-ACC (1993); McDonald's All-American (1991); First-team Parade All-American (1991); Virginia Mr. Basketball (1991)

Career NBA statistics
- Points: 1,677 (5.5 ppg)
- Rebounds: 481 (1.6 rpg)
- Assists: 834 (2.7 apg)
- Stats at NBA.com
- Stats at Basketball Reference
Medals
Men's basketball
Representing United States
FIBA U21 World Championship
Gold medal – first place	1993 Valladolid	National team
FIBA U20 Americas Championship
Silver medal – second place	1993 Rosario	National team

Cory Lynn Alexander (born June 22, 1973) is an American former professional basketball player who is a college basketball analyst for ESPN. He was a Parade and McDonald's All-American while he played basketball at Oak Hill Academy. Alexander played college basketball for the Virginia Cavaliers and was selected in the 1995 NBA draft by the San Antonio Spurs. He played seven seasons in the National Basketball Association (NBA) with the Spurs, Denver Nuggets, Orlando Magic and Charlotte Bobcats. Alexander also played in the NBA Development League and overseas in Italy.

After retiring as a player, Alexander worked as an analyst for the University of Virginia radio network and the Raycom Sports-produced ACC Network. He joined ESPN in 2009 as a college basketball analyst.

== Early life ==
Alexander developed his passion for basketball through playing at a YMCA in Waynesboro, Virginia, where a man his mother, Bonita Wallace, dated served as the program director. He started his high school basketball career at Waynesboro High School. Alexander transferred to Flint Hill School for his junior season and emerged as among the top college basketball prospects.

Alexander transferred to Oak Hill Academy for his senior season in 1990–91. He had played as a shooting guard throughout his high school career but moved to point guard at Oak Hill Academy. Alexander averaged 15.9 points, 9.4 assists and 2.9 rebounds per game during his senior season. He was selected as a member of the Parade All-American first-team and played in the 1991 McDonald's All-American Game.

Alexander narrowed his college basketball team decision down to the Virginia Cavaliers and Arizona Wildcats. He chose to play for the Cavaliers and attend the University of Virginia which was close to his home.

== College basketball career ==
Alexander played for the Virginia Cavaliers from 1991 to 1995. He was selected to the All-ACC second-team as a sophomore in 1993 when he averaged 18.8 points per game. Alexander suffered a broken right ankle during the opening game of the 1993–94 season and did not return for the year. He was granted a redshirt but announced in October 1994 that he would not play out his fifth year of eligibility and instead turn professional in 1995. He averaged 16.6 points per game during the 1994–95 season until he suffered another season-ending broken right ankle during a game on February 8, 1995.

Alexander's 401 career assists are eighth highest in Cavaliers history and he ranks 24th on the team's all-time scoring list with 1,286 points.

== Professional career ==
Alexander was selected by the San Antonio Spurs as the 29th overall pick of the 1995 NBA draft. He had his best season in the National Basketball Association in 1996–97 when he averaged 7.2 points and 3.2 assists. Alexander was relegated to a little-used reserve with the Spurs and was waived on February 27, 1998. Alexander was sought after as a free agent and signed with the Denver Nuggets five days later. He re-signed with the Nuggets on January 22, 1999. Alexander averaged 2.8 points, 2.0 assists and 1.4 rebounds per game with the Nuggets during the 1999–2000 season. On January 29, 2001, he joined the Orlando Magic on a 10-day contract. Alexander spent the rest of the season with the Magic although he received limited playing time.

Alexander joined the Roanoke Dazzle of the National Basketball Development League (NBDL) during the 2002–03 season. He totalled 306 assists which was an NBDL single-season record. Alexander played in Italy for Virtus Roma during the 2003–04 season and averaged 11.1 points, 3.2 rebounds and 2.8 assists per game. He returned to the Dazzle for the 2004–05 season and averaged 16.4 points and a league-leading 8.3 assists per game. On February 28, 2005, Alexander signed with the Charlotte Bobcats as the team needed to improve their depth at the point guard position. It was his last stint in the NBA.

== National team career ==
Alexander played for the United States national team at the 1993 FIBA Under-21 World Championship where he won a gold medal.

== NBA career statistics ==
Legend
GP	Games played	GS	Games started	MPG	Minutes per game
FG%	Field goal percentage	3P%	3-point field goal percentage	FT%	Free throw percentage
RPG	Rebounds per game	APG	Assists per game	SPG	Steals per game
BPG	Blocks per game	PPG	Points per game	**Bold**	Career high

=== Regular season ===
Year	Team	GP	GS	MPG	FG%	3P%	FT%	RPG	APG	SPG	BPG	PPG
1995–96	San Antonio	60	0	9.3	.406	.394	.640	0.7	2.0	0.5	0.0	2.8
1996–97	San Antonio	**80**	6	18.2	.396	.373	.736	1.5	3.2	1.0	0.2	7.2
1997–98	San Antonio	37	3	13.5	.414	.313	.676	1.3	1.9	0.7	0.1	4.5
1997–98	Denver	23	**19**	**34.7**	**.435**	.411	**.846**	**4.3**	**6.0**	**2.0**	**0.3**	**14.0**
1998–99	Denver	36	4	21.6	.373	.286	.841	2.1	3.3	1.0	0.1	7.3
1999–00	Denver	29	2	11.3	.286	.257	.773	1.4	2.0	0.8	0.1	2.8
2000–01	Orlando	26	0	8.7	.321	.250	.667	1.0	1.4	0.6	0.0	2.0
2004–05	Charlotte	16	1	12.6	.327	**.421**	.750	1.8	2.3	0.6	0.1	3.1
Career		307	35	15.8	.389	.354	.756	1.6	2.7	0.9	0.1	5.5

=== Playoffs ===
Year	Team	GP	GS	MPG	FG%	3P%	FT%	RPG	APG	SPG	BPG	PPG
1996	San Antonio	9	0	7.8	.417	.200	.714	1.0	1.0	0.2	0.0	2.9

== Post-playing career ==
=== Broadcasting career ===
On October 1, 2008, Alexander was announced as the analyst of Virginia Cavaliers basketball radio broadcasts alongside play-by-play announcer Dave Koehn for the 2008–09 season. He joined the radio team because he had ambitions of joining the coaching staff of Cavaliers head coach Dave Leitao. Alexander worked in the role for three seasons until his departure in 2011 because he wanted to prioritize his television and coaching pursuits.

Alexander joined ESPN as a broadcaster in 2009.

=== Coaching career ===
On September 26, 2011, Alexander was announced as an assistant coach for the NCAA Division III basketball team at Hampden–Sydney College. He served in a part-time volunteer role. Alexander wanted to join a Division III staff so he could still instruct at his Cory Alexander Basketball School, which he founded in 1995. He had ambitions of receiving a coaching job at an NCAA Division I school.

Alexander has served as an assistant coach at Oak Hill Academy.

== Personal life ==
Alexander's son, Cory II, played baseball for the Old Dominion Monarchs. His cousin, Kenny Brooks, played college basketball for the James Madison Dukes.

Alexander runs Castles Real Estate which is based in Richmond, Virginia.
