= Harriet French Turner =

American painter (1886–1967)

- Born: April 7, 1886; Giles County
- Died: December 7, 1967 (aged 81); Roanoke
- Occupation: Painter

Harriet French Turner (7 April 1886 – 7 December 1967) was an American folk artist.

Harriet Clark French was born on 7 April 1886 in Giles County, Virginia, the daughter of Guy Dingess French and Barbara Elizabeth Snidow. They moved to Roanoke, Virginia, in 1900, where she attended the Roanoke Academy of Music and graduated from Roanoke High School in 1907. She taught at Gilmer Elementary School for two years until she married druggist James R. Turner. They had three daughters.

She began painting at age 68, later drawing comparisons to Grandma Moses. Inspired by the scenery of the Blue Ridge Mountains area, she painted mostly landscapes. The first painting she exhibited was purchased for the collection of Hollins College, and her immediately drew widespread attention. She was the first living artist to be featured in a one-person show at the Abby Aldrich Rockefeller Folk Art Museum, which created a 17 minute documentary about her called Folk Artist of the Blue Ridge. Her admirers included First Lady Lady Bird Johnson, who requested Turner's painting of the Peaks of Otter. Turner's artistic career lasted 13 years and she created 95 paintings.

Harriet French Turner died on December 7, 1967, in Roanoke.
