= Shannon Taylor (American football) =

American football player (born 1972)

No. 94, 54, 56
- Position: Linebacker

Personal information
- Born: February 16, 1972 (age 54); Roanoke, Virginia, U.S.
- Listed height: 6 ft 3 in (1.91 m)
- Listed weight: 247 lb (112 kg)

Career information
- High school: Patrick Henry (Roanoke, VA); Fork Union Military Academy (VA)
- College: Virginia
- NFL draft: 2000: 6th round, 184th overall pick

Career history
- San Diego Chargers (2000); Baltimore Ravens (2001–2002); Houston Texans (2003)*; Jacksonville Jaguars (2003)
- * Offseason or practice squad member only
- Stats at Pro Football Reference

Shannon Andre Taylor (born February 16, 1972) is an American former professional football player who was a linebacker for four seasons in the National Football League (NFL).

Taylor was born and raised in Roanoke, Virginia. He attended both Patrick Henry High School and Fork Union Military Academy. He played collegiate football at the University of Virginia.

Taylor was selected 184th overall by the San Diego Chargers in the sixth round of the 2000 NFL draft. He was with the Chargers for one year, before spending time with the Baltimore Ravens and the Jacksonville Jaguars.
