= Pat Sullivan (basketball) =

American basketball coach (born 1971)

North Carolina Tar Heels
- Title: Assistant coach
- League: Atlantic Coast Conference

Personal information
- Born: December 15, 1971 (age 54) New York City, New York, U.S.
- Listed height: 6 ft 8 in (2.03 m)
- Listed weight: 215 lb (98 kg)

Career information
- High school: Bogota (Bogota, New Jersey)
- College: North Carolina (1990–1995)
- NBA draft: 1995: undrafted
- Position: Small forward
- Number: 3
- Coaching career: 1997–present

Career history

Coaching
- 1997–2000: North Carolina (assistant)
- 2001–2003: UNC Wilmington (women's assistant)
- 2004–2005: Detroit Pistons (assistant)
- 2005–2008: New Jersey Nets (assistant)
- 2008–2011: Detroit Pistons (assistant)
- 2013–2016: Washington Wizards (assistant)
- 2016–2018: Los Angeles Clippers (assistant)
- 2018–2020: New York Knicks (assistant)
- 2020–2021: Minnesota Timberwolves (player development/defense)
- 2021–2024: North Carolina (Director of Recruiting)
- 2024–present: North Carolina (assistant)

Career highlights
- As player: NCAA champion (1993); Third-team Parade All-American (1990)

Patrick Sullivan (born December 15, 1971) is an American basketball coach, currently serving as the Director of Recruiting at his alma mater, North Carolina. He joined the staff of former teammate Hubert Davis in April 2021, a move that was confirmed by the school that May. In his Tar Heel playing career, Sullivan was a member of three Final Four teams, including the 1992–93 team that won the national championship. After starting with stints at North Carolina and UNCW as an assistant, Sullivan spent the majority of his coaching career in the NBA before returning to Chapel Hill.

== Playing career ==
Sullivan was born in New York City and was a highly recruited high school player at Bogota High School in Bogota, New Jersey, where in 1990 he was named a third-team high school All-American by Parade Magazine while leading the Buccaneers to a state championship. The small forward ultimately chose to play for coach Dean Smith at North Carolina (UNC), choosing the Tar Heels over Duke, Virginia, Providence and Seton Hall. Sullivan was a bench contributor and sometime starter for his most of career, and was on the floor for Chris Webber’s infamous “time-out” at the end of the 1993 national championship game. He redshirted in what would have been his senior season in 1993–94 which allowed Sullivan to join the 1994–95 Tar Heels, where was able to become the first Tar Heel to play in three Final Fours since 1969.

== Coaching career ==
In 1997, Sullivan was hired as an assistant coach at his alma mater, UNC under Bill Guthridge. He served in this role until 2000, when Guthridge retired and new coach Matt Doherty chose to bring in a new staff. Sullivan was then an assistant women's coach at UNC Wilmington for two seasons before leaving in 2003 for a video coordinator role with the Detroit Pistons of the National Basketball Association (NBA). After being a part of the staff for the NBA champion 2003–04 Detroit Pistons, Sullivan was promoted to a full assistant for the following year. Sullivan then held assistant roles with the New Jersey Nets, a repeat run with the Pistons, the Washington Wizards and Los Angeles Clippers before joining the staff of new New York Knicks coach David Fizdale in 2018. After a few months on the Minnesota Timberwolves coaching staff in a development role, Sullivan was reported to join new head coach Hubert Davis' inaugural UNC staff in a player development role in April. He was officially announced as the Tar Heels' new Director of Recruiting in May 2021.
