= Addicks, Houston =

Area in Houston, Texas, US

Coordinates: 29°46′56″N 95°38′32″W

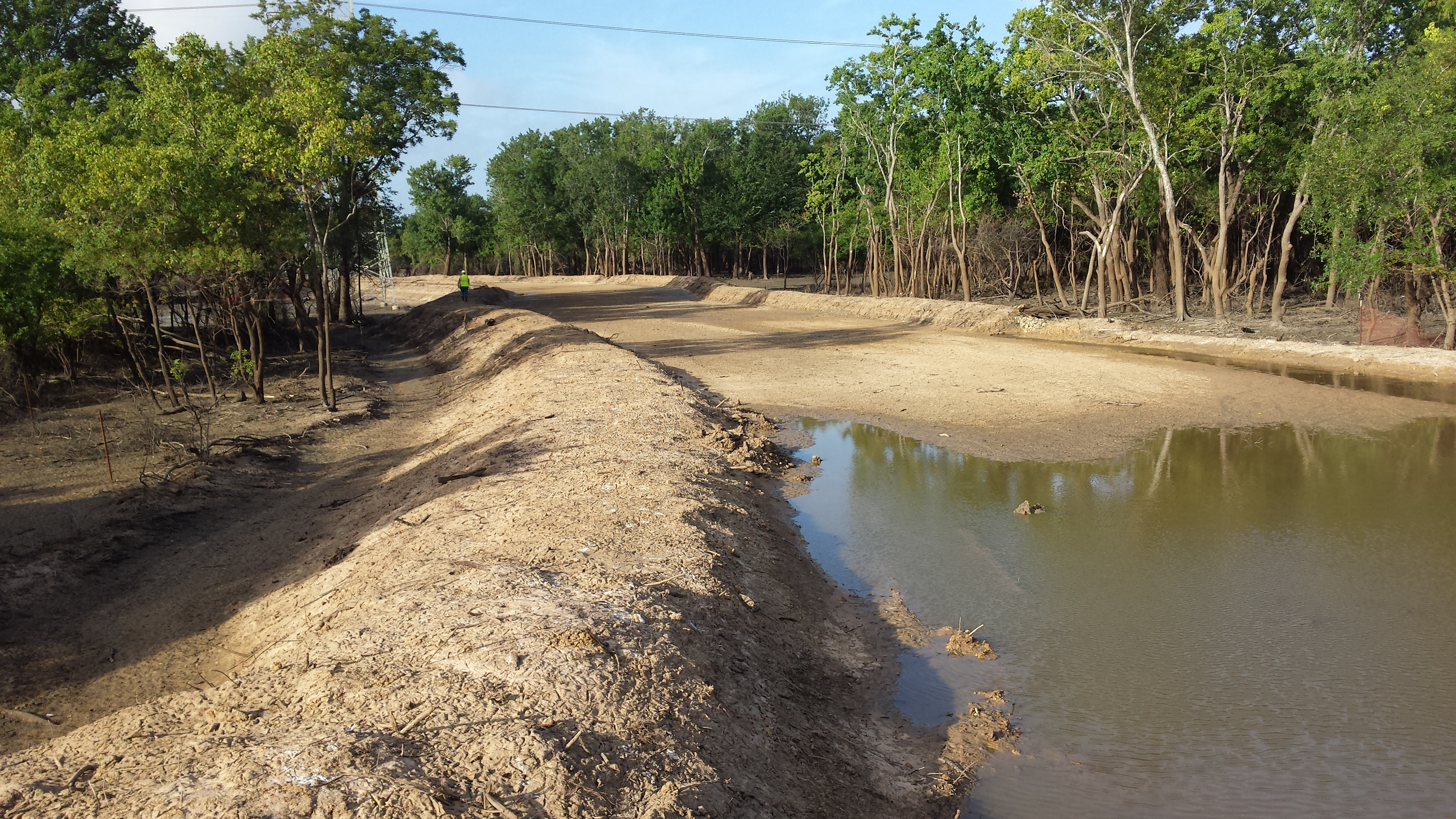
Photos of the Addicks and Barker dams and reservoirs show water returning to normal levels following a historic period of flooding in the region during April and May 2016.

Addicks is an area of Houston that was formerly its own community.

Addicks, a railroad stop for the Bear Creek community, was named after its original postmaster, Henry Addicks, in 1884. The original town site was located just south of the intersection of Patterson Road and Highway 6. The Addicks Bear Creek Cemetery contains the graves of many of the original German settlers. The town and surrounding community were destroyed by the Hurricane of 1900 but were quickly rebuilt. By 1947 the community was forced to move several miles south near the current intersection of I-10 and Highway 6 since the old location became the site for the Addicks Reservoir. Many of the old buildings can still be found. The Addicks Bear Creek Methodist Church, founded in 1879, is a historical building and can be found on the east side of Highway 6 near Addicks Dam. The church is now known as Addicks United Methodist Church . Other old buildings located near the southeast corner of I-10 and Highway 6, make up a trendy area of shops, antique stores, and restaurants.

The City of Houston annexed the Addicks-Barker Reservoir area in 1972.

== Education ==
Addicks is served by the Katy Independent School District. The following schools serve Addicks:

- Wolfe Elementary School (for all elementary aged pupils in Addicks) (Houston) (formerly Addicks Elementary School; the school was renamed in 1986 in honor of former school superintendent and then Addicks Elementary principal, Mr. Maurice Wolfe.) The original school mascot (Addicks Bobcats) became the Lobos (Wolfe Lobos).
- Cardiff Junior High School (for pupils living north of Interstate 10) (Unincorporated Harris County)
- Mayde Creek Junior High School (for pupils living north of Interstate 10) (Unincorporated Harris County)
- Memorial Parkway Junior High School (for pupils living south of Interstate 10) (Unincorporated Harris County)
- Mayde Creek High School (for pupils living north of Interstate 10) (Unincorporated Harris County)
- James E. Taylor High School (for pupils living south of Interstate 10) (Unincorporated Harris County)

Addicks was, at one time, served by the Addicks Independent School District. The last graduating class of Addicks High School was in 1948. By the mid-1950s, there were only 6 grades in Addicks Elementary School. Seventh through twelfth grades were bussed to schools in Katy. Portions of Addicks ISD later consolidated into Katy ISD in 1961. The school board at the time could have guided Addicks ISD to consolidate into Spring Branch ISD, but they chose to merge with Katy because it (Katy ISD) was still a rural district.. The rest of Addicks ISD was absorbed by other school districts.

== Roads ==
- Interstate 10
- State Highway 6
- Memorial Drive
- Addicks-Howell Road
- Eldridge Parkway
- Lamb Road
- Barker Cypress Road
- Park Row Boulevard

The names of many of the oldest roads in the area indicate the two towns they connect. For example, Addicks-Satsuma Road once linked the small town of Addicks with the small town of Satsuma, Texas once located near the intersection of Highway 6 and Highway 290. Remnants of this road are still in use today as a part of Highway 6 north of Interstate 10. Similarly, Addicks-Howell Road connected Addicks to the small town of Howellville once located near the intersection of Highway 6 and Westheimer Road. While most of the original Addicks-Howell Road was paved over during the re-routing of present-day Highway 6, the northernmost stretch still exists just south of its intersection with Interstate 10. Other roads that follow this convention include Addicks-Fairbanks Road (present day Eldridge Parkway north of Interstate 10) and Addicks-Clodine Road (most of which was abandoned after building of the Barker Reservoir). Jackrabbit Road was named because of the plethora of jackrabbits that once lived around and often darted across the narrow, two-lane road. Jackrabbit Road once extended from the present site of the community of Addicks north toward Fairbanks; the road intersected with then-Hempstead Highway/now US 290. In the late 1950s, much of the dirt-and-gravel Jackrabbit Road was widened and replaced with the new FM 1960. The section of FM 1960 south of US 290 toward Addicks and continuing south past Addicks was later renamed State Highway 6. Portions of Jackrabbit Road south of US 290 remain; it is east of current SH 6.

== Parks ==
- Terry Hershey Park
- Bear Creek Park
- George Bush Park

== Notes ==
- Addicks is home to the Addicks Dam and Addicks Reservoir.
