= Harry Penn =

Harry Theodore Penn (1902? in Lynchburg, Virginia – May 8, 1963 in Roanoke) was an American dentist and civic activist in Roanoke, Virginia.

== Education and work ==
Penn was a graduate of Virginia Seminary, now the Virginia University of Lynchburg, and Howard University College of Dentistry in 1931. Penn was a dentist and proprietor of drug stores.

He later became president of the National Dental Association. "In 1958, NDA President Harry T. Penn, Roanoke, Virginia, represented the Association at the Minorities Community Resources Conference convened at the Washington Willard Hotel with Vice President Richard M. Nixon serving as chairman of President Dwight Eisenhower's Committee on Government Contracts", formed under Executive Order 10479.

Penn was also past president of the Western District Dental Society, the Old Dominion Dental Society and the National Dental Association. He was also past president and board chairman of the Burrell Memorial Hospital.

== Local politics ==
Penn was named to the Roanoke School Board in 1948, "...becoming the first black person to serve on a school board in the south." He later also unsuccessfully ran for the Roanoke City Council in 1942, 1944 and 1952.

He was also active in Virginia voter registration, and was elected to the "Allied Civic and Political Organization" in order to sponsor a drive to secure 200,000 back voters.

Penn first retired from politics after 1951, but became involved again with the powerful United Citizen's Council of Virginia. He was also a trustee of both the Burrell Memorial Hospital and the First Baptist Church.

Disgusted with Virginia politicians' attitude toward segregation and the Byrd Organization, Penn moved to Washington, DC, in 1961, but later returned to Roanoke.

== Lemarco Manufacturing Company ==
In Roanoke, he established the Lemarco Manufacturing Company to employ blacks, especially black women, in the area. "A Negro dressmaking firm has received over $4,000 in pledges to buy stock in the company. Some 85 Negroes yesterday attended a meeting at the St. Paul Methodist Church and filled out applications for jobs at the LeMarco Manufacturing Co. The dress-making firm was formed by Roanoke Negroes so that more of them could find work. It's backed by the Roanoke Development Association. Dr. Harry Penn, who heads up the development company, says about 100 people will be interviewed. The dress factory plans to open for business about March first... It's hoped that about 60 persons eventually will be employed by the firm." The company later folded. "Employees of the Lemarco dress manufacturing company receive new paychecks after the original checks bounced the previous week due to financial troubles within the company." December 24, 1958. and the manufacturing plant was made into a successful nightclub in Roanoke in 1961.

In an article about Penn, published in 2006, the company was described as a personal project: "Penn organized a group of workers at the end of the 1950s and opened Lamarco Manufacturing Co., a dress-making plant on the old Fifth Street in Northwest Roanoke that offered jobs to blacks. To get the business running, Penn mortgaged his home at 923 Madison Ave. N.W. and his Centre Avenue property, Bruner said. The business, which had 55 employees -- about two-thirds of them black -- went under in 1960 with losses totaling $50,000, according to newspaper articles. Penn blamed a personal illness, the high cost of training and an $11,000 loss caused by the failure of a New York company the factory had done business with. "He just got a raw deal from the person he bought the machines from," Bruner said. "He was trying to do something good to help the employment of black women."

== Non-professional activities ==
Penn was a member of Omega Psi Phi fraternity and served as 3rd district representative (?-1947) and served as the 19th Grand Basileus of Omega Psi Phi from December 1947 through 1949.

Penn was a member of an interracial committee to improve racial relations in Roanoke in 1960. He was a training and program director for the local Boy Scouts of America. He was a member of the Roanoke Civic League, and active in Democratic Party politics, working for the election of John F. Kennedy in 1960. He was also a past president of the Dinner Club of Roanoke.

Penn was also elected the first president of the Roanoke Colored Civic League when it was formed in 1941. The League had been formed by the consolidation of the Independent Voter's League and the Colored Civic League. By the end of the month, it had 149 members.

Harry T. Penn was also active in the Roanoke Branch of the National Association for the Advancement of Colored People.

== Suicide ==
Penn committed suicide in Roanoke, Virginia in May 1963. He was survived by his wife, Mrs. Letita S. Penn; one son, Harry T. Penn, Jr., and one daughter. Miss Mary A. Penn.

== Legacy ==
Penn Hall at Patrick Henry High School in Roanoke is named in his honor. "Penn Hall will be the last of these buildings to go. In 1975, it was named in honor of Dr. Harry T. Penn, a dentist, businessman and civic activist. In 1942, Penn became the first black candidate for city council. He had the support of the 300-member Roanoke Civic League, "the most representative body of colored citizens in the city," according to a Roanoke Times clipping. But his bid failed, as did his campaigns in 1944 and 1952. In 1948, Councilman Benton O. Dillard nominated Penn for the school board. Two other councilmen declined to participate in the vote, offering no explanations. But Penn did become the first black person appointed to the board, "at least to the knowledge of local school officials," the paper reported. He served one three-year term. Penn, a Lynchburg native and longtime critic of segregation, was a member of an interracial committee to improve race relations in 1960. He died in 1963 at age 61."
