= Howellville, Texas =

- Unincorporated area
- Location within Texas Location within the United States
- Coordinates: 29°42′41″N 95°38′04″W
- Country: United States
- State: Texas
- County: Harris
- Elevation: 85 ft (26 m)
- Time zone: UTC-6 (Central (CST))
  - Summer (DST): UTC-5 (CDT)
- ZIP code: 77082
- Area code: 281

Howellville or Howell is an unincorporated community in Harris County, Texas, United States, which has been absorbed by Greater Houston. The site is located at the intersection of Alief Clodine Road and Sugar Land Howell Road on the west side of Houston, approximately halfway between the original settlements of Clodine and Alief. There are no road signs identifying the place. The community began as a stop on a railroad line that no longer exists.

== Geography ==
Howellville is located on Alief Clodine Road, 0.6 miles (1.0 km) east of Texas State Highway 6 (SH 6). The Westpark Tollway is on the north side and parallel with east–west running Alief Clodine Road. O'Donnell Middle School in Alief Independent School District is located on the southeast corner of the Alief Clodine Road and Sugar Land Howell Road intersection. The southwestern corner is occupied by the Park Village Apartments. Hearne Elementary School is one block south of O'Donnell School. A few manufacturing businesses are located a short distance to the northeast on the north side of the tollway. An artificial lake, which is part of Brays Bayou, can be seen approximately 400 yards (366 m) to the north. The name Howell is preserved in two local roads. Sugar Land Howell Road (or Howell Sugar Land Road) begins at the site and extends south 2.8 miles (4.5 km) to Old Richmond Road in Fort Bend County. SH 6 is also called Addicks Howell Road through the area and almost as far north as Interstate 10 at the site of Addicks.

== History ==
T. E. Howell founded a town about 10 miles (16 km) southwest of Houston which became a stop on the railroad. A 1919 USGS map identified the site as Howell on the San Antonio and Aransas Pass Railway. The settlement had a post office from 1920 to 1934. With the help of a drainage program, the land supported dairy farming and the raising of corn and rice. A population of around 36 persons lived in the area from the 1920s to the 1990s. A 1955 USGS map named the community Howellville and situated it on the Texas and New Orleans Railroad. The 1982 USGS map identified the location as Howellville on the Southern Pacific Railroad. The Westpark Tollway was built on the Southern Pacific Railroad right-of-way after the land was sold to the Harris County Toll Road Authority.

== Gallery ==
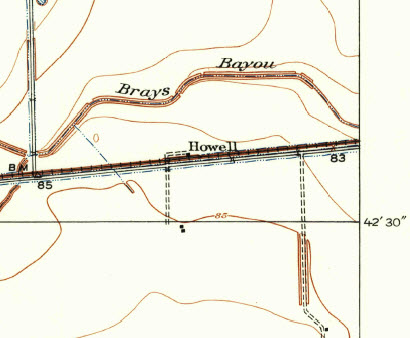
Howell is on a 1915 USGS map. The railroad is identified as the San Antonio and Aransas Pass while the road going north from the 85' benchmark (BM) is Addicks Road.

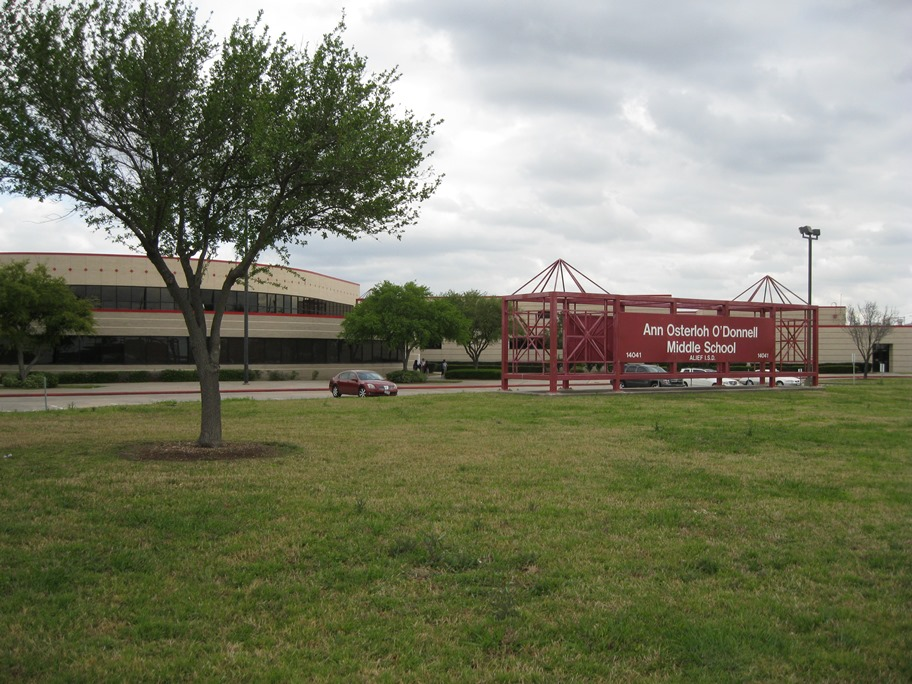
Ann Osterloh O'Donnell Middle School is at Alief-Clodine Road and Howell Sugar Land Road. The school is part of Alief Independent School District.

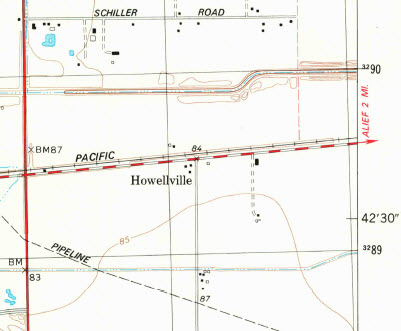
Howellville appears on a 1982 USGS map. State Highway 6 is the vertical red line at left while Alief-Clodine Road is the dashed red and white line from left to right.
