= Patrick Henry High School (Roanoke, Virginia) =

Location
- 2102 Grandin Road SW; Roanoke, Virginia 24015; United States

Information
- School type: Public school
- Established: 1961
- School district: Roanoke City Public Schools
- NCES District ID: 5103300
- School code: VA-124-1240390
- NCES School ID: 510330001430
- Principal: Joe Booan
- Faculty: 132.59 (on an FTE basis)
- Grades: 9-12
- Enrollment: 2,016 (2025-26)
  - Grade 9: 602
  - Grade 10: 530
  - Grade 11: 468
  - Grade 12: 416
- Student to teacher ratio: 15.20:1
- Colors: Purple and Gold
- Nickname: Patriots
- Rival: William Fleming High School
- USNWR ranking: 11,947
- Yearbook: The Patriot
- Website: ph.rcps.info

Patrick Henry High School is a public high school located in the Grandin Court neighborhood of Roanoke, Virginia. It is one of the two general enrollment high schools for the Roanoke City Public Schools. The school is located on Grandin Road SW near the intersection with Brandon Avenue SW in the Raleigh Court neighborhood.

The school is named for Virginia's first governor and American Founding Father and Revolution leader Patrick Henry.

== History ==
Patrick Henry High School was established in 1961 upon the completion of its construction, with the capacity to accommodate around 1,200 students. Patrick Henry was an open campus-style school with three main buildings (Parsons Hall, Persinger Hall, McQuilkin Hall) named after prominent RCPS and Roanoke community members. Penn Hall, named in honor of Harry Penn, was completed in 1975, increasing the school's capacity to 1,600. In 1989, the school division implemented the middle school concept that extended Patrick Henry's enrollment to 9th graders. In 2006, the school's campus-style layout with multiple buildings (or "halls") was replaced with a newly constructed, conventional school building. The entire project was completed in 2008. A new senior patio, a small square behind the main building that is intended for use as an outside dining area during lunch periods, was completed in 2010.

== Curriculum ==
Patrick Henry High School is a comprehensive high school that includes grades 9-12 with a student enrollment of 2,035 students. The school offers numerous Advanced Placement courses along with partnering with Virginia Western Community College to provide Dual Enrollment college courses at PH. The Roanoke Valley Governor's School for Science and Technology also sits on Patrick Henry campus.

== Extracurricular activities ==
=== Athletics ===
Patrick Henry High School is a member of the Virginia High School League and competes in the Class 5A North Region in the River Ridge District. Patrick Henry High School has won 13 state VHSL championships in Football (1973), Basketball (1988, 1992), Tennis (2004), Forensics (2014, 2015, 2016, 2018), Girls Swim (2016, 2017, 2018, 2019), and Boys Lacrosse (2017).

==== Football ====
Patrick Henry High School Football Team won the 1973 AAA State Championship, capping an undefeated season. Merrill Gainer was the head coach of the Patrick Henry Patriots and the current football stadium at PH is named after him.

==== Basketball ====
Patrick Henry High School won Group AAA state titles in boys basketball in 1988 and 1992. University of North Carolina and eventual NBA basketball player George Lynch led the Patriots to a AAA State Championship in 1988, his junior year. Patrick Henry won in the semifinals against Alonzo Mourning's Indian River High School team. Curtis Staples led the team again in 1992. Staples went on to play at the University of Virginia and played pro basketball for eight years. Woody Deans coached the team. The basketball court in the new gymnasium on campus has been named Woody Deans Court in his honor.

==== Tennis ====
In 2004, PH won the VHSL AAA State Tennis Championship. Brock Newton and Tyler Early also won the 2004 AAA State doubles championship. Newton and Early were inducted into the Patrick Henry High School Sports Hall of Fame with the 2022 class.

==== Swimming ====
The PH Girls Swim Team won the 2016 5A State Championship, 2017 5A State Championship, and 2018 5A State Championship. and the 2019 5A State Championship.

==== Lacrosse ====
The PH Boys Lacrosse won the 2017 5A State Championship in June 2017.

=== Forensics ===
In 2014, the Forensics Team won the VHSL 6A State Championship. The PH Forensics Team repeated as the 2015 5A State Champions and did a "3-Peat" 5A State Championship in 2016. The PH Forensics team won the 2018 5A State Championship.

=== Chess team and theater ===
On December 10-December 12, 2006, the chess team went to the National Grade Level Championships in Lake Buena Vista, Florida, and won second place for the 10th grade level. In 2007, the 10th grade chess team repeated their national second place in Houston, Texas, and the 11th grade team won the national championship. In 1988 the theatre department won state VHSL championship for the second time. The first was the year before.

== Notable alumni ==
- Tony Atlas - bodybuilder and professional wrestler
- Curtis Blair - NBA referee
- Tanquil Lisa Collins - actress, writer, Miss Virginia 1983
- Chris Combs - retired NFL player
- John S. Edwards - Virginia State Senator
- Wayne LaPierre - former CEO of National Rifle Association
- George Lynch - retired NBA player
- Curtis Staples - former NCAA record-holder for career three-point field goals
- Shannon Taylor - retired NFL player
- Russell Turner - head men's basketball coach at the University of California, Irvine
