= Burrell Memorial Hospital =

Hospital in Virginia, US

- U.S. National Register of Historic Places
- Virginia Landmarks Register
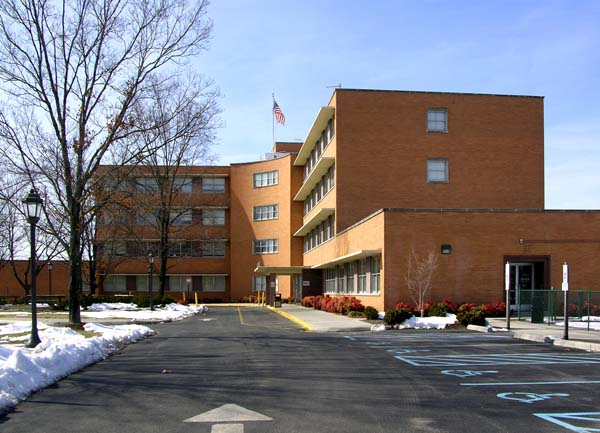
- Burrell Memorial Hospital, February 2010

- Location within Virginia Location within the United States
- Location: 611 McDowell St. NW, Roanoke, Virginia
- Coordinates: 37°16′57″N 79°57′39″W
- Area: 3.8 acres (1.5 ha)
- Built: 1954
- Architect: Hannaford, Harvey E. (Samuel Hannaford & Son, Cincinnati, OH); Stone and Thompson (Roanoke, VA).
- Architectural style: International Style
- NRHP reference No.: 03000450
- VLR No.: 128-5863

Significant dates
- Added to NRHP: September 22, 2003
- Designated VLR: March 19, 2003

Burrell Memorial Hospital, currently operating as Blue Ridge Behavioral Health (BRBH) Burrell Center, was an historic African-American hospital originally located in the Gainsboro neighborhood of Roanoke, Virginia. The hospital replaced the 1914 Medley Hospital. It opened March 18, 1915 as a 10-bed facility in a converted home at 311 Henry Street. In 1921 the hospital moved to a new, 55-bed location in the adjacent Harrison Neighborhood, having renovated the former Allegheny Institute (originally the Rorer Hotel, 1883) at 611 McDowell Ave., NW. The final facility was constructed 1954-55 on the same property as a four-story, 73,000 square foot, International Style building. It is T-shaped with three wings extending from a central elevator core. The building housed the only African-American medical facility in Roanoke from 1915 to 1965. It was listed on the National Register of Historic Places in 2003. Burrell Memorial Hospital closed in 1979 due to financial strain and reopened the same year as the Burrell Home for Adults, an adult care facility. This facility grew to provide specialized care to residents, but eventually closed as Burrell Nursing Center in 2002.

In the early 20th century, hospitals in the Appalachian region of Virginia were segregated. In Roanoke and southwest Virginia there were no hospitals available to individuals not considered to be white. "[S]everal black physicians in the area, including Dr. Issac David Burrell, were working diligently to establish a hospital for black residents. In the midst of these efforts, Dr. Burrell became seriously ill with gallstones and was forced to travel in a train baggage car to Washington, D.C. for treatment. He died following surgery, and the heart-wrenching circumstances of his death served as a catalyst to ensure that this tragedy would not be repeated for another black person.

On March 18, 1915, Burrell Memorial Hospital, named in honor of Dr. Burrell, opened at 311 Henry Street. It began as a 10-bed facility equipped with $1,000 of borrowed money but went on to become the first African-American hospital to earn full approval of the American Board of Surgeons. Dr. Lylburn C. Downing, who had been the first African-American accepted as a member of the Roanoke Medical Society, became the first superintendent and held that position until 1947. "After Burrell's death, the doctors Downing, Williman and Roberts, joined by John Claytor, Sr., and Jerry Cooper, founded Burrell Memorial with ten beds on North Henry Street in March 1915."

The flu epidemic of 1919 created the need for expanded facilities, so the hospital moved into the abandoned Allegheny Institute building on the corner of McDowell Avenue and Park Street (now 7th Street) in 1921. This building was used until 1955 when the present hospital was opened.

Burrell Memorial Hospital remained a prominent black institution until the 1965 Civil Rights Act mandated the desegregation of hospital facilities. In 1979, the hospital closed. as of 2023 The Burrell Center is home to Blue Ridge Behavioral Healthcare.
