= George Lynch (basketball) =

American basketball player (born 1970)

Personal information
- Born: September 3, 1970 (age 56) Roanoke, Virginia, U.S.
- Listed height: 6 ft 8 in (2.03 m)
- Listed weight: 235 lb (107 kg)

Career information
- High school: Patrick Henry (Roanoke, Virginia); Flint Hill (Oakton, Virginia)
- College: North Carolina (1989–1993)
- NBA draft: 1993: 1st round, 12th overall pick
- Drafted by: Los Angeles Lakers
- Playing career: 1993–2005
- Position: Small forward
- Number: 24, 30, 34, 9
- Coaching career: 2012–present

Career history

Playing
- 1993–1996: Los Angeles Lakers
- 1996–1998: Vancouver Grizzlies
- 1999–2001: Philadelphia 76ers
- 2001–2002: Charlotte Hornets
- 2002–2005: New Orleans Hornets

Coaching
- 2012–2013: SMU (assistant)
- 2017–2018: Grand Rapids Drive (assistant)
- 2018–2020: Clark Atlanta

Career highlights
- NCAA champion (1993); First-team All-ACC (1993); Third-team All-ACC (1992); No. 34 honored by North Carolina Tar Heels; Virginia Mr. Basketball (1989); McDonald's All-American (1989)

Career NBA statistics
- Points: 5,109 (6.6 ppg)
- Rebounds: 3,902 (5.0 rpg)
- Assists: 1,121 (1.4 apg)
- Stats at NBA.com
- Stats at Basketball Reference
Medals
Men's basketball
Representing United States
Summer Universiade
Gold medal – first place	1991 Sheffield	National team

George DeWitt Lynch III (born September 3, 1970) is an American former NCAA champion and professional basketball player who played in the National Basketball Association (NBA) from 1993 to 2005 after winning the 1993 NCAA National Championship as a member of the North Carolina Tar Heels

== Early life ==
Lynch was born two months premature and had to spend more than a month in an incubator. He was raised in Roanoke, Virginia, and played basketball at Patrick Henry High for coach Woody Deans. Lynch was part of the 1988 Virginia State Champion Team at Patrick Henry. For his senior year, he transferred to Flint Hill School, a prep school located outside Washington, D.C. to better his chances at college prospects.

== College ==
Lynch played four years at North Carolina under coach Dean Smith. Known for his impact on the defensive end, Lynch sported averages of 12.5 points and almost eight rebounds per game during his college career. With 1.7 steals per game, he finished his career ranked second on the UNC all-time list.

In his sophomore year, Lynch reached the NCAA Final Four with the team. As a team captain, he led North Carolina to an NCAA title in 1993 and made the All-Final Four Tournament team.

== Professional career ==
He was selected by the Los Angeles Lakers with the 12th overall pick in that year's NBA draft. Lynch would be the last Laker to wear #34 before he was traded to the Vancouver Grizzlies along with Anthony Peeler in 1996 in order to open up salary cap space to sign Shaquille O'Neal. He joined the Philadelphia 76ers as a free agent in 1999.

With Theo Ratliff, Tyrone Hill, Eric Snow, Dikembe Mutombo, Allen Iverson, and coach Larry Brown Lynch helped form one of the better defenses in the league. With the 76ers, Lynch reached the 2001 NBA Finals.

After playing with the 76ers for three seasons, he was traded to the Charlotte Hornets in a three-way trade also involving Derrick Coleman, Jérôme Moïso, Robert Traylor, and Vonteego Cummings, among others, in 2001, retiring after 2004–05.

== NBA career statistics ==
Legend
GP	Games played	GS	Games started	MPG	Minutes per game
FG%	Field goal percentage	3P%	3-point field goal percentage	FT%	Free throw percentage
RPG	Rebounds per game	APG	Assists per game	SPG	Steals per game
BPG	Blocks per game	PPG	Points per game	**Bold**	Career high
*	Led the league

=== Regular season ===
Year	Team	GP	GS	MPG	FG%	3P%	FT%	RPG	APG	SPG	BPG	PPG
1993–94	L.A. Lakers	71	46	24.8	**.508**	.000	.596	5.8	1.4	1.4	.4	**9.6**
1994–95	L.A. Lakers	56	15	17.0	.468	.143	.721	3.3	1.1	.9	.2	6.1
1995–96	L.A. Lakers	76	6	13.3	.430	.308	.663	2.8	.7	.6	.1	3.8
1996–97	Vancouver	41	27	25.8	.471	.258	.619	6.4	1.9	1.5	.4	8.3
1997–98	Vancouver	**82***	0	18.2	.481	.300	.703	4.4	1.5	.8	**.5**	7.5
1998–99	Philadelphia	43	43	30.6	.421	.391	.631	6.5	1.8	**2.0**	**.5**	8.3
1999–00	Philadelphia	75	75	32.2	.461	**.417**	.617	**7.8**	1.8	1.6	**.5**	**9.6**
2000–01	Philadelphia	**82**	**80**	**32.3**	.445	.263	.719	7.2	1.7	1.2	.4	8.4
2001–02	Charlotte	45	18	19.8	.369	.167	.625	4.1	1.2	.9	.3	3.8
2002–03	New Orleans	81	32	18.5	.409	.354	.554	4.4	1.3	.8	.2	4.5
2003–04	New Orleans	78	51	21.8	.397	.309	.667	4.0	1.5	.6	.2	4.8
2004–05	New Orleans	44	27	21.2	.360	.297	**.739**	4.0	**2.0**	.7	.3	3.7
Career		774	420	22.8	.446	.306	.652	5.0	1.4	1.1	.3	6.6

=== Playoffs ===
Year	Team	GP	GS	MPG	FG%	3P%	FT%	RPG	APG	SPG	BPG	PPG
1995	L.A. Lakers	**10**	0	13.6	.469	.200	.650	3.0	.7	.8	.0	4.4
1996	L.A. Lakers	2	0	7.5	**.500**	.000	–	1.5	.5	.0	.0	2.0
1999	Philadelphia	8	6	31.1	.446	**.333**	.706	6.6	**2.0**	**2.3**	.3	**9.0**
2000	Philadelphia	**10**	**10**	29.3	.338	.143	**.778**	7.1	1.4	.9	.5	5.9
2001	Philadelphia	**10**	8	22.2	.480	.000	.643	5.1	1.2	1.3	.2	5.7
2002	Charlotte	9	7	**31.8**	.492	**.333**	.692	**8.4**	1.6	1.1	.7	7.7
2003	New Orleans	6	3	27.2	.429	.278	.250	6.2	1.7	1.0	**.8**	7.0
2004	New Orleans	7	7	21.1	.439	.250	.625	5.3	1.7	.4	.4	8.3
Career		62	41	24.4	.439	.250	.670	5.8	1.4	1.1	.4	6.5

== Post-playing career ==
Lynch worked as a personal trainer, in 2006 he founded a non-profit youth basketball program (Flight Nine Basketball) in Dallas, which he directed until 2010.

On December 20, 2006, he joined the Southern Methodist University men's basketball staff under head coach Matt Doherty, who was part of the 1981–82 NCAA championship team. Lynch became the team's administrative assistant/graduate manager. He spent 2010–2012 at UC Irvine as a strength and conditioning coach for basketball and an assistant athletics director for community relations before re-joining the SMU men's basketball staff in 2012 under head coach and fellow UNC alum Larry Brown. In April 2018, Lynch was named head coach of Clark Atlanta University. In 2020, his contract was not renewed.

In October 2022, Lynch joined the Charlotte Hornets’ TV broadcasting staff as a studio analyst.
