= Antoinette Hale =

American painter

E. Antoinette Hale was an American painter.

Hale was born in Roanoke, Virginia. She attended Virginia State University where she graduated with a degree in sociology. She became a social worker. She took painting classes in Los Angeles, California at the defunct L & E School of Fine Arts in the 1970s.

She started painting full-time when she retired. Her work has been exhibited at the Harrison Museum of African American Culture, Mary Baldwin University and Virginia Tech.

Curators at the Harrison Museum of African American Culture call Hale "one of the most important artists working in the Roanoke Valley in the late 20th century."

== Notable collections ==
- The Debutante, 1986, Taubman Museum of Art, Roanoke, Virginia
