= Donald Williams (basketball) =

American basketball player

Personal information
- Born: February 24, 1973 (age 53) Raleigh, North Carolina, U.S.
- Listed height: 6 ft 3 in (1.91 m)
- Listed weight: 190 lb (86 kg)

Career information
- High school: Garner Magnet (Garner, North Carolina)
- College: North Carolina (1991–1995)
- NBA draft: 1995: undrafted
- Playing career: 1995–2003
- Position: Point guard / shooting guard

Career history
- 1995–1996: UBC St.Pölten
- 1996–1997: TuS Herten
- 1997–1998: Sporting Athens
- 1998: Hapoel Zefat
- 1998: Sioux Falls Skyforce
- 1998–1999: Formula Shell
- 1999: Brandt Hagen
- 1999–2000: AEL Limassol
- 2000–2001: Besançon BCD
- 2001: Richmond Rhythm
- 2001–2002: Harlem Globetrotters
- 2002–2003: Limoges CSP

Career highlights
- As player: PBA champion (1998 Governors'); German League Top Scorer (1997); NCAA champion (1993); NCAA final Four Most Outstanding Player (1993); No. 21 honored by North Carolina Tar Heels; Fourth-team Parade All-American (1991); North Carolina Mr. Basketball (1991); McDonald's All-American (1991)
Medals
Men's basketball
Representing United States
Summer Universiade
Gold medal – first place	1993 Buffalo

Donald E. Williams Jr. (born February 24, 1973) is an American former professional basketball player.

== Amateur career ==
Born in Raleigh, North Carolina, where he also spent his childhood, Williams played for Garner High School in Garner, North Carolina under coach Eddie Gray before going on to play at the University of North Carolina at Chapel Hill for the late coach Dean Smith.

The 6'3" tall point guard-shooting guard from the University of North Carolina was the recipient of the NCAA basketball tournament Most Outstanding Player Award when North Carolina won the 1993 NCAA National Championship. In the final game against the University of Michigan, Williams scored 25 points, hitting five of his seven 3-point attempts.

== Professional career ==
After college, Williams led a successful career playing professionally in Cyprus, Germany, Austria, Poland, France, Sweden, Finland, Greece and the Philippines, where he won a championship in 1998 as a player for Formula Shell, coached by Perry Ronquillo, and the Dominican Republic.

== Coaching career ==
Williams is currently the head women's basketball coach at Wakefield High School and the founder and operator of the Donald Williams Basketball Academy. Williams was named coach of the year during the '17–'18 season and during the '18–'19. Under the leadership of Williams, the Wakefield ladies' basketball team went to the final two conference during the '17–'18 season and won the state championship, while remaining undefeated, during the '18–'19 season.
