= Matt Wenstrom =

American basketball player (born 1970)

Personal information
- Born: November 4, 1970 (age 56) Minneapolis, Minnesota, U.S.
- Listed height: 7 ft 1 in (2.16 m)
- Listed weight: 250 lb (113 kg)

Career information
- High school: Mayde Creek (Houston, Texas)
- College: North Carolina (1989–1993)
- NBA draft: 1993: undrafted
- Position: Center
- Number: 50

Career history
- 1993–1994: Boston Celtics

Career highlights
- NCAA champion (1993); Second-team Parade All-American (1989); McDonald's All-American (1989)
- Stats at NBA.com
- Stats at Basketball Reference

Matthew William Wenstrom (born November 4, 1970) is an American former professional basketball player. He played for the Boston Celtics in the National Basketball Association (NBA) during the 1993–94 NBA season.

Wenstrom, a highly ranked 7'1 center from Mayde Creek High School in Houston, Texas, played collegiately at the University of North Carolina and was a reserve on the Tar Heels 1993 national championship team as a senior. Wenstrom's career averages were 4.0 minutes, 1.6 points and 1.1 rebounds per game.

Undrafted in the 1993 NBA draft, Wentrom nonetheless made the Boston Celtics roster as a free agent. He appeared in 11 games during the 1993–94 season, averaging 1.6 points and 1.1 rebounds per game in his only NBA season.

In the 1994–95 season, he played for Austrian Bundesliga side Trodat Wels, followed by a stint (1995 until February 1998) at German team TuS Herten.
