= Curtis Staples =

American basketball player (born 1976)

Personal information
- Born: July 14, 1976 (age 50) Roanoke, Virginia, U.S.
- Listed height: 6 ft 3 in (1.91 m)
- Listed weight: 198 lb (90 kg)

Career information
- High school: Patrick Henry (Roanoke, Virginia); Oak Hill Academy (Mouth of Wilson, Virginia)
- College: Virginia (1994–1998)
- NBA draft: 1998: undrafted
- Position: Shooting guard

Career history
- 2002–2003: Huntsville Flight
- 2003–2004: Roanoke Dazzle

Career highlights
- Third-team All-ACC (1998); No. 5 jersey retired by Virginia Cavaliers; Third-team Parade All-American (1994); Virginia Mr. Basketball (1994); McDonald's All-American (1994)
Medals
Men's basketball
Representing United States
Summer Universiade
Gold medal – first place	1997 Trapani	Team competition

Curtis Staples (born July 14, 1976) is an American former basketball player who played from 1994 to 1998 for the University of Virginia. He was a sophomore starter on Virginia Group AAA champion Patrick Henry High School in 1992. He played at, and is a 1994 graduate of, Oak Hill Academy in Mouth of Wilson, Virginia.

== Early life and high school career ==
Staples was born in Roanoke, Virginia. As a sophomore, he was a starter and leading scorer on Patrick Henry High School's 1992 Virginia Group AAA state championship team. He later transferred to Oak Hill Academy in Mouth of Wilson, Virginia, graduating in 1994. At Oak Hill, he averaged 23.6 points per game as a senior.

In 1994, Staples was named Virginia Mr. Basketball and selected as a McDonald's All-American. He was also named a third-team Parade All-American.

Staples was regarded as one of the top high school prospects in the United States during his senior year, participating in national-level showcase events and drawing recruiting attention before choosing to remain in-state and attend Virginia.

== College career ==
Staples played for the Virginia Cavaliers under head coach Jeff Jones from 1994 to 1998. He scored 1,757 career points and made 413 three-point field goals. He set a Virginia single-season record with 130 three-pointers in 1997–98. He earned third-team All-ACC honors in 1998 and contributed to Virginia’s 1994–95 team that advanced to the NCAA Elite Eight.

He finished his collegiate career with 413 three-point field goals, which established an NCAA record at the time.

His scoring total of 1,757 points places him among the top scorers in Virginia program history.

== Three point record ==
Staples is best known for breaking the all-time NCAA record for career three-point field goals, previously held by Radford University's Doug Day, at 413. Staples' record stood for nearly eight years after his career ended, until JJ Redick of Duke University broke it on February 14, 2006. Staples had actually conducted a basketball clinic in Virginia which Redick attended as a pre-teen; Redick's rare shooting ability caught Staples's eye even then. Redick told The Roanoke Times, "I was a big Curtis Staples fan."

Staples attended the record-breaking game and remarked, "I've always said, like the old saying goes, records are meant to be broken. J.J. has been a hard worker and deserves everything that he gets. I'm glad to see somebody like J.J. breaking it. He's a very significant player that we will never forget."

== Professional playing career ==
After graduating in 1998, Staples played eight seasons of professional basketball overseas. He participated in NBA summer leagues with the Chicago Bulls and Portland Trail Blazers. He was also signed as a rookie free agent by the Chicago Bulls in 1999. Internationally, he played in FIBA Europe leagues in Spain and Italy (including with Scafati Basket) and in the Philippine Basketball Association. In the United States, he competed in the National Basketball Development League (now NBA G League) for the Huntsville Flight (2002–2003) and Roanoke Dazzle (2003–2004).

== Coaching career ==
After he retired from playing, Staples was the head coach for Virginia Episcopal School basketball team in Lynchburg, Virginia for eight seasons. During his tenure, the program experienced sustained competitive success in the Virginia Independent Schools Athletic Association (VISAA), including multiple Division II Final Four appearances and two state championships, according to contemporaneous reporting.

Additional reporting has noted that Staples helped develop and mentor student-athletes, with more than 120 players advancing to collegiate basketball programs across NCAA Division I, II, and III levels during his prep coaching career.

He then moved to Tennessee to become the head coach of the boys basketball team at Lakeway Christian Academy.

In his first season at Lakeway Christian Academy (2018–19), the team finished 25–1 and won a National Association of Christian Athletes (NACA) national championship.

He was named the Citizen Tribune All-Lakeway Area Boys Basketball Coach of the Year in 2019 and again in 2025 after his final season.

He stepped down in March 2025 after seven seasons. Staples also served in administrative and mentorship roles within athletic programs, contributing to player development and program building during his coaching career.

He has also been involved in youth mentorship initiatives, supporting programs aimed at providing academic and athletic development opportunities for young athletes.

In 2025, Staples joined the Detroit Pistons as a scout in the National Basketball Association (NBA). His transition into scouting followed a high school coaching career, during which he compiled a combined record of 518 wins and 42 losses and won three state championships. During that period, more than 120 of his players advanced to NCAA programs across Division I, II, and III. At Lakeway Christian Academy, his teams won a National Association of Christian Athletes (NACA) national championship in the 2018–19 season and a TSSAA championship in 2025. He also pursued legal studies at Northwestern California University School of Law.

== Personal life ==
Staples is married to Alani Staples. The couple has two sons.

== Honors ==
The University of Virginia retired Staples' jersey (#5) on November 12, 2006, during halftime of Virginia's first game in its new John Paul Jones Arena. Staples ranks ninth on Virginia's career scoring list with 1,757 points.

== See also ==
- List of NCAA Division I men's basketball season 3-point field goal leaders
- List of NCAA Division I men's basketball career 3-point scoring leaders
