= Mayde Creek High School =

Public school in Texas, United States

Location
- 19202 Groschke Rd; Houston, Texas 77084; USA; 29.80637°N 95.69557°W

Information
- Type: Public Secondary
- Motto: "Ram Pride Never Dies"
- Established: 1984
- Principal: Lizzie Herring
- Staff: 205.39 (FTE)
- Grades: 9–12
- Enrollment: 2,970 (2023-2024)
- Student to teacher ratio: 14.46
- Campus: Suburban
- Colors: Kelly green, white and black
- Athletics conference: UIL Class 6A
- Mascot: Ram
- Affiliations: Katy Independent School District
- Website: www.katyisd.org/MCHS

Mayde Creek High School (MCHS) is a public high school located on Groschke Road in unincorporated Harris County, Texas, and is part of the Katy Independent School District. Mayde Creek serves the portions of the city of Houston located in Katy ISD, including Addicks. Mayde Creek also serves many unincorporated communities in Harris County.

The school opened in 1984, with two grades, eighth and ninth. By the 1985-1986 academic year it held 8th, 9th, 10th graders; 1986-1987 held 9th,10th,11th graders.

== History ==
In 2012 Children at Risk ranked Mayde Creek as the third-best "Urban" (meaning with a low-income student body at or above 50%) comprehensive high school in the Houston area.

== Awards and honors ==
- All 1st Division UIL Marching Contest, 1st Division Award, 2003, 2004, 2005, 2006, 2007, 2008, 2009, 2010, 2011, 2012, 2014, 2015, 2016, 2017, 2018, 2019, and 2020.
- 3rd (Bronze), 5A UIL State, Lincoln Douglas Debate Contest, 2010.
- Football playoff appearances in 1987, 88, 93, 94, 96, 97, 2007, 2008 and 2019.
- The school received an accountability rating of B for the 2021-2022 school year. In the Class of 2021, 92.6% of students received their high school diplomas on time or earlier. The dropout rate for students in grades 9-12 was 1.8% during the 2020-2021 school year. The average SAT score at Mayde Creek High School was 963 for 2020-2021 graduates. The average ACT score was 22.4.

== Feeder patterns ==
The following elementary schools feed into Mayde Creek High School:

- Mayde Creek Elementary
- Schmalz Elementary
- Bear Creek Elementary
- Rhoads Elementary
- Stephens Elementary (partial)
- McRoberts Elementary (partial)
- Wolfe Elementary (partial)

The following junior high schools feed into Mayde Creek High School:

- Mayde Creek Junior High
- Cardiff Junior High

== See also ==
- Katy Independent School District
- List of schools in Harris County, Texas
