= Oak Hill Academy (Virginia) =

Christian boarding school in Mouth of Wilson, Virginia, United States

Location
- 2635 Oak Hill Road; Mouth of Wilson, Virginia 24363; United States; 36.5992443°N 81.3399567°W

Information
- Type: Private; boarding; college preparatory; Christian school
- Motto: "Where Your Potential Becomes Possible"
- Religious affiliation: Christian
- Denomination: Baptist
- Established: 1878
- Principal: Aaron Grubbs
- Head of school: Micah Kurtz
- Faculty: 20.4 (on an FTE basis)
- Grades: 8–12
- Gender: Co-educational
- Enrollment: 115 (2021–22); 100% boarding
- Average class size: 17–20 students
- Campus: 240 acres (97 ha)
- Campus type: Rural
- Colors: Red; Gold; Black
- Nickname: Warriors
- Accreditation: SACS, VAIS
- Publication: The Arrow
- Newspaper: Word of Mouth
- Tuition: $34,555–$41,570 (2019–20)
- Website: www.oak-hill.net

Oak Hill Academy is a co-educational, private, Christian secondary school in Mouth of Wilson, Virginia, United States. Oak Hill enrolls approximately 120 students in grades 8–12, and is 100% boarding. It is accredited by the Virginia Association of Independent Schools and is authorized to enroll international students.

== History ==
In 1873, the New River Baptist Association of Virginia established Oak Hill Academy. The school held its first classes in September 1878.

== Athletics ==
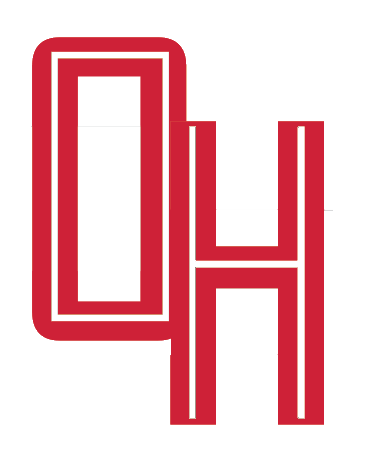
Logo for the Oak Hill Academy Warriors

Sports offered at Oak Hill include, Gold, Red, and White basketball, baseball, and tennis for boys; and volleyball, cheerleading, and tennis for girls.

=== Basketball program ===
The Oak Hill Academy Warriors basketball program is considered by some as one of the top prep basketball teams in the nation, having produced potential future NBA Hall of Famers including Kevin Durant, Carmelo Anthony, and Rajon Rondo,. In 2017, USA Today ranked Oak Hill as the third best basketball program of the decade. Under head coach Steve Smith, the Oak Hill Warriors were crowned National High School Champions nine times, in 1993, 1994, 1999, 2001, 2004, 2005, 2007, 2012 and 2016.

Oak Hill Academy Basketball Hall of Fame inductees:

- Carmelo Anthony
- Calvin Duncan
- Ron Mercer
- Josh Smith
- Jerry Stackhouse
- Rod Strickland

== Notable alumni ==
=== NBA players ===
- Jordan Adams – played for the Memphis Grizzlies, was the 22nd overall pick in the NBA draft
- Cory Alexander – played at the University of Virginia and in the NBA
- Carmelo Anthony – played at Syracuse University; drafted third in 2003; Olympic Gold medalist with Team USA; 2003 NCAA Champion; NBA All-Star; NBA Hall Of Famer; attended Towson Catholic High School in Baltimore before transferring
- Cole Anthony – 2019 McDonald's All-American Game MVP, played for the North Carolina Tar Heels; drafted 15th in the 2020 by the Orlando Magic
- William Avery – former Duke University point guard, and former NBA player for the Minnesota Timberwolves
- Dwayne Bacon – played at Florida State University, and former NBA player for the Orlando Magic and Charlotte Hornets
- Michael Beasley – transferred to Notre Dame Prep, 2007 McDonald's All American Game MVP, played at Kansas State University; selected second in the 2008 NBA draft
- Alex Blackwell – played at Monmouth College and briefly in the NBA
- Steve Blake – played at the University of Maryland, last played for the Detroit Pistons in the NBA
- Mark Blount – played at the University of Pittsburgh, former NBA player
- Junior Burrough – played at the University of Virginia and briefly for the Boston Celtics in the NBA
- Quinn Cook – two-time NBA champion for the Golden State Warriors and Los Angeles Lakers
- Ben Davis – played at the University of Arizona and briefly in the NBA
- DeSagana Diop – former NBA player for the Dallas Mavericks and Charlotte Bobcats, current coaching associate of the Utah Jazz
- Kevin Durant (transferred to Montrose Christian School before graduating) – played at The University of Texas; second pick in 2007 NBA draft; co-MVP of the 2006 McDonald's All-American Game; NBA Rookie of the Year; 13x NBA All-Star; 2014 NBA MVP, 4x scoring champion, 2x NBA champion, and 2x Finals MVP, currently playing for the Houston Rockets
- Harry Giles III (briefly attended due to injury, later transferred to Forest Trail Academy before graduating) – played at Duke University, 20th pick in the 2017 NBA draft, current NBA player for the Portland Trail Blazers
- Sean Green – played at Iona College and briefly in the NBA
- A. J. Hammons – played for the Dallas Mavericks and Miami Heat
- Stephen Jackson – former NBA player, 2003 NBA champion, and most recently of the Los Angeles Clippers
- Brandon Jennings – former NBA player, most recently for the Washington Wizards, selected 10th in the 2009 NBA draft, played for Italy's Lottomatica Roma 2008 Mr. Basketball USA
- Keldon Johnson – NBA player for the San Antonio Spurs, played college basketball at Kentucky Wildcats
- Keyontae Johnson – NBA player for Oklahoma City Thunder
- Braxton Key – played college basketball for Alabama and Virginia, NCAA champion, NBA player
- Doron Lamb – McDonald's All-American; played at University of Kentucky; player for the Milwaukee Bucks and the Orlando Magic
- Ty Lawson – former NBA player, most recently for the Washington Wizards, played at the University of North Carolina; went to Bishop McNamara High School before going to Oak Hill Academy
- Chris Livingston – played at Kentucky, drafted 58th in 2023 by the Milwaukee Bucks
- Caleb Martin – played at NC State University for two years, then transferred to the University of Nevada to finish college career; current player for the Dallas Mavericks
- Cody Martin – played at NC State University for two years, then transferred to the University of Nevada to finish college career; current player for the Charlotte Hornets
- Jeff McInnis – played at the University of North Carolina; former player on the Portland Trail Blazers, Los Angeles Clippers, and the New Jersey Nets
- Ben McLemore – NBA player for Portland Trail Blazers, selected 7th overall in NBA draft
- Ron Mercer – played at the University of Kentucky from 1995 to 1997; played for 7 NBA teams
- Billy Preston – NBA player for the Cleveland Cavaliers
- Josh Reaves – played in the NBA for the Dallas Mavericks; currently playing professional basketball in Turkey; attended Penn State
- Rajon Rondo – played at the University of Kentucky; drafted 21st in the NBA draft, won the 2008 and 2020 NBA championships with the Celtics and Lakers; an All-Star in 2010, 2011, 2012, and 2013; last played for the Cleveland Cavaliers
- Josh Smith – drafted first round, 17th pick by the Atlanta Hawks in the 2004 NBA draft; last played for the New Orleans Pelicans
- Nolan Smith – played for Duke University, in the NBA for the Portland Trail Blazers; son of Derek Smith, who starred at the University of Louisville
- Jerry Stackhouse – played at the University of North Carolina and in the NBA for six teams; two-time NBA All-Star; head coach of the Vanderbilt Commodores men's basketball team
- Rod Strickland – played at DePaul University and drafted 19th in the 1988 NBA draft; played 17 seasons in the NBA for nine teams; All-NBA Second Team in 1998
- Cameron Thomas – plays for the Brooklyn Nets
- Sindarius Thornwell – played for the University of South Carolina, drafted by Milwaukee Bucks and traded to the Los Angeles Clippers, currently on the G League team affiliated with the NBA's Orlando Magic
- Lindell Wigginton – college player for the Iowa State Cyclones, declared for the 2019 NBA draft, plays for the Milwaukee Bucks
- Marcus Williams – 2004 National Championship with UConn; played with the New Jersey Nets, Golden State Warriors, Memphis Grizzlies, and in Serbia and Spain
- Troy Williams – former NBA player, most recently played for the Sacramento Kings

=== Other alumni ===
- Darion Clark – played for USC, later played for Chicago Bears in the NFL
- Kofi Cockburn – formerly played for the University of Illinois, former Big Ten Freshman of the Year
- Matt Coleman III – professional basketball player for Hapoel Haifa of the Israeli Basketball Premier League, played college basketball for Texas
- Eric Devendorf – former player at Syracuse University and a 2006–07 All-Big East Honorable Mention selection
- Lennard Freeman (born 1995) – player in the Israeli Basketball Premier League
- Keith Gallon – played one year at the University of Oklahoma
- Jamont Gordon – former player at Mississippi State University
- Justin Gray – former player at Wake Forest University
- Venson Hamilton – former player at University of Nebraska–Lincoln
- Cliff Hawkins – former player at Kentucky and professional player in Europe and Asia
- Ike Iroegbu (born 1995) – American-born Nigerian basketball player for Hapoel Galil Elyon of the Israeli Basketball Premier League
- Lamont Jones – currently plays for Mitteldeutscher
- Alex Legion – currently plays for Fortitudo Bologna
- David McCormack – played college basketball for Kansas, professional basketball player in Basketbol Süper Ligi
- Landon Milbourne (born 1987) – last played in the Israeli Basketball Premier League
- Judah Mintz – college player for Syracuse Orange
- K.C. Rivers – currently plays for Zenit Saint Petersburg
- D'Vauntes Smith-Rivera – played for Georgetown University, last played for Koroivos
- Curtis Staples – drafted by the Chicago Bulls in 1998, eighth in NCAA career three-point field goals, at 413
- Juwan Staten – former player at West Virginia University, and a two-time first-team All-Big 12 selection
- Travis Watson – last played for Lugano Tigers
