= Roanoke High School (Virginia) =

School

Coordinates: 37.2709°N 79.9449°W

Roanoke High School was the first public high school in Roanoke, Virginia. Located at 211-217 Church Ave. S.W., it opened on February 6, 1899. It closed in 1924, replaced by Jefferson High School, and became a school administration building. It was demolished in February 1968 and is now the site of the Noel C. Taylor Municipal Building.
