= Mouth of Wilson, Virginia =

Unincorporated community in Virginia, United States

Coordinates: 36°35′22″N 81°20′11″W

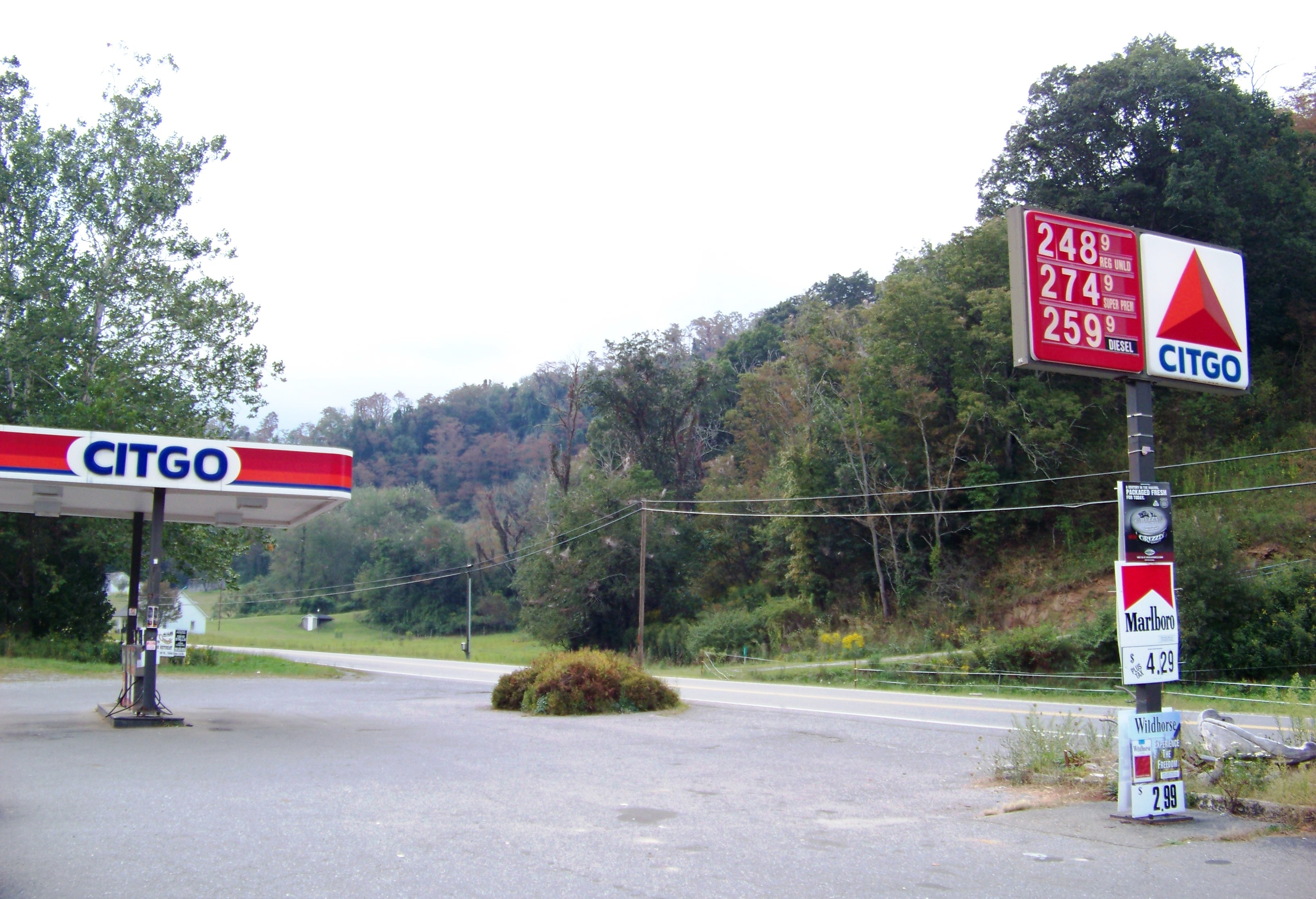
Gas station in Mouth of Wilson

Location in Virginia

Mouth of Wilson is an unincorporated community in Grayson County in the U.S. state of Virginia, just north of the North Carolina state line. The community lies in the Blue Ridge Highlands section of the Blue Ridge Mountains, which are part of what is considered the Middle Appalachian Mountains, on the western banks of the New River, where Big Wilson Creek empties its waters. The main road through the area is U.S. Route 58; other major roads include Virginia Route 16 and Virginia Route 93 (County Line Road).

== History ==
The name Mouth of Wilson originates from a young surveyor named Wilson, who died and was buried in a creek while surveying the line between Virginia and North Carolina in 1749. The creek was thenceforth known as Wilson Creek, which empties into the New River where the town was established. The first European settler in the region was Robert Parsons, a veteran of the American Revolutionary War, who was awarded a grant of 1,600 acres (6.5 km^{2}) from the North Carolina line to Wilson Creek. One of Parsons' nine sons, Johnny Parsons, built the first mill on the creek. The mill was built to grind corn, with a sawmill as an extension. Johnny Parsons served one term as the overseer of the South Fork and New River Turnpike in the Virginia General Assembly. Another mill was constructed in 1884 by Colonel Fields J. McMillan. The community built a power dam in 1930, introducing electricity to Mouth of Wilson.

== Oak Hill Academy ==
Oak Hill Academy, a Baptist-affiliated secondary school, is located in Mouth of Wilson. Oak Hill was built in 1878. Rev. W. A. Hash became principal in 1923 and oversaw the accreditation of the school and construction of dormitories, a water system, and electric lines. In recent history, the school has earned eight national high-school basketball championships since 1993, becoming widely recognized for its athletic programs. Most students are boarders, so that the population of Mouth of Wilson increases substantially during the school year.
