= 1992–93 Tennessee State Tigers basketball team =

American college basketball season

1992–93 Tennessee State Tigers basketball

OVC Regular season champions OVC tournament champions

NCAA tournament
- Conference: Ohio Valley Conference
- Record: 19–10 (13–3 OVC)
- Head coach: Frankie Allen (2nd season)
- Home arena: Gentry Complex

1992–93 Ohio Valley Conference men's basketball standings
	Conf.				Overall
Team	W		L	PCT	W		L	PCT
Tennessee State †	13	–	3	.813	19	–	10	.655
Eastern Kentucky	11	–	5	.688	15	–	12	.556
Murray State	11	–	5	.688	18	–	12	.600
Tennessee Tech	9	–	7	.563	15	–	13	.536
Southeast Missouri State	9	–	7	.563	16	–	11	.593
Morehead State	6	–	10	.375	6	–	21	.222
Middle Tennessee	5	–	11	.313	10	–	16	.385
Austin Peay	4	–	12	.250	7	–	20	.259
UT Martin	4	–	12	.250	7	–	19	.269
† 1993 OVC tournament winner Rankings from AP Poll

The 1992–93 Tennessee State Tigers basketball team represented Tennessee State University as a member of the Ohio Valley Conference during the 1992–93 NCAA Division I men's basketball season. The Tigers, led by second-year head coach Frankie Allen, played their home games at the Gentry Complex in Nashville, Tennessee as members of the Ohio Valley Conference. After finishing atop the OVC regular season standings, the Tigers backed up that success by winning the OVC tournament to receive the conference's automatic bid to the NCAA tournament – the first in school history. Playing as No. 15 seed in the Southeast region, Tennessee State was beaten by Seton Hall, 81–59.

== Roster ==
1992–93 Tennessee State Tigers men's basketball team
Players	Coaches
Pos. / # / Name / Height / Weight / Year / Hometown; C / / Carlos Rogers / 6 ft 10 in (2.08 m) / 215 lb (98 kg) / Jr	Head coach: Frankie Allen (Roanoke); Assistant coach(es) Legend: (C) Team captain; (S) Suspended; (I) Ineligible; (W) Walk-on; Injured; Current redshirt; Roster

== Schedule and results ==
Date time, TV	Rank^{#}	Opponent^{#}	Result	Record	Site (attendance) city, state
Non-conference regular season
Dec 1, 1992*		Jackson State	W 70–63	1–0	Gentry Complex; Nashville, Tennessee
Dec 4, 1992*		at Southwest Missouri State	L 66–79	1–1	
Dec 5, 1992*		vs. Arkansas–Little Rock	W 62–60	2–1	
Dec 11, 1992*		St. Francis (NY)	W 79–73 ^{OT}	3–1	Gentry Complex (825); Nashville, Tennessee
Dec 12, 1992*		at George Washington; Red Auerbach Colonial Classic	L 63–83	3–2	Charles E. Smith Center; Washington, D.C.
Dec 21, 1992*		at Saint Louis	L 61–83	3–3	
Dec 30, 1992*		at LSU	L 68–90	3–4	Maravich Assembly Center; Baton Rouge, Louisiana
Jan 4, 1993*		at Alabama	L 80–95	3–5	Coleman Coliseum; Tuscaloosa, Alabama
OVC regular season
Jan 9, 1993		Southeast Missouri State	W 95–70	4–5 (1–0)	Gentry Complex; Nashville, Tennessee
Jan 11, 1993		Murray State	W 80–76	5–5 (2–0)	Gentry Complex; Nashville, Tennessee
Jan 13, 1993		at Middle Tennessee State	W 78–70	6–5 (3–0)	Murphy Center; Murfreesboro, Tennessee
Jan 16, 1993		at Morehead State	W 86–75	7–5 (4–0)	Ellis Johnson Arena; Morehead, Kentucky
Jan 18, 1993		at Eastern Kentucky	L 73–75	7–6 (4–1)	McBrayer Arena; Richmond, Kentucky
Jan 23, 1993*		Missouri–Kansas City	W 84–71	8–6	Gentry Complex; Nashville, Tennessee
Jan 25, 1993		Tennessee-Martin	W 85–67	9–6 (5–1)	Gentry Complex; Nashville, Tennessee
Jan 28, 1993		at Tennessee Tech	W 102–79	10–6 (6–1)	Eblen Center; Cookeville, Tennessee
Jan 30, 1993		Austin Peay	W 93–68	11–6 (7–1)	Gentry Complex; Nashville, Tennessee
Feb 6, 1993		Morehead State	W 96–72	12–6 (8–1)	Gentry Complex; Nashville, Tennessee
Feb 8, 1993		Eastern Kentucky	W 93–84	13–6 (9–1)	Gentry Complex; Nashville, Tennessee
Feb 11, 1993		Middle Tennessee State	W 84–67	14–6 (10–1)	Gentry Complex; Nashville, Tennessee
Feb 15, 1993		at Tennessee-Martin	W 79–70	15–6 (11–1)	Skyhawk Arena; Martin, Tennessee
Feb 20, 1993		at Southeast Missouri State	L 77–94	15–7 (11–2)	Show Me Center; Cape Girardeau, Missouri
Feb 22, 1993		at Murray State	W 82–75	16–7 (12–2)	Racer Arena; Murray, Kentucky
Feb 25, 1993		Tennessee Tech	W 82–78	17–7 (13–2)	Gentry Complex; Nashville, Tennessee
Feb 27, 1993		at Austin Peay	L 77–80	17–8 (13–3)	Dunn Center; Clarksville, Tennessee
Ohio Valley tournament
Mar 5, 1993*		vs. Tennessee Tech; Semifinals	W 77–71	18–9	Rupp Arena; Lexington, Kentucky
Mar 6, 1993*		vs. Murray State; Championship game	W 82–68	19–9	Rupp Arena; Lexington, Kentucky
NCAA tournament
Mar 18, 1993*	(15 SE)	vs. (2 SE) No. 6 Seton Hall; First Round	L 59–81	19–10	Orlando Arena; Orlando, Florida
*Non-conference game. ^{#}Rankings from AP Poll. (#) Tournament seedings in parentheses. SE=Southeast. All times are in Central.
