= 1992–93 Arizona Wildcats men's basketball team =

American college basketball season

1992–93 Arizona Wildcats men's basketball

Pac-10 regular season champions

NCAA tournament, first round
- Conference: Pacific-10 Conference

Ranking
- Coaches: No. 12
- AP: No. 5
- Record: 24–4 (17–1 Pac-10)
- Head coach: Lute Olson (10th season)
- Assistant coaches: Jim Rosborough (4th season); Jessie Evans (5th season)
- Home arena: McKale Center

1992–93 Pacific-10 Conference men's basketball standings
	Conf.				Overall
Team	W		L	PCT	W		L	PCT
No. 5 Arizona	17	–	1	.944	24	–	4	.857
California	12	–	6	.667	21	–	9	.700
UCLA	11	–	7	.611	22	–	11	.667
Arizona State	11	–	7	.611	18	–	10	.643
USC	9	–	9	.500	18	–	12	.600
Oregon State	9	–	9	.500	13	–	14	.481
Washington	7	–	11	.389	13	–	14	.481
Washington State	9	–	9	.500	15	–	12	.556
Oregon	3	–	15	.167	10	–	20	.333
Stanford	2	–	16	.111	7	–	23	.233
Rankings from AP Poll

The 1992–93 Arizona Wildcats men's basketball team represented the University of Arizona as members of the Pacific-10 Conference during the 1992–93 season. The team was led by head coach was Lute Olson. and their home games were played in McKale Center.

After an impressive 17–1 record, winning the Pac-10 regular-season title with a 5-game margin, the team was seeded second in the West region of the NCAA tournament. However, they suffered an upset in the first round, losing to Santa Clara, 64–61. The team finished the season with an overall record of 24–4. This marked the second consecutive NCAA Tournament in which the Wildcats were eliminated in the opening round by a double-digit seed.

== Roster ==
1992–93 Arizona Wildcats men's basketball team
Players
Coaches

Pos.	#	Name	Height	Weight	Year	Hometown
G	3	Khalid Reeves	6 ft 3 in (1.91 m)	195 lb (88 kg)	Jr	Queens, New York
G	20	Damon Stoudamire	5 ft 10 in (1.78 m)	165 lb (75 kg)	So	Portland, Oregon
F	22	Ray Owes	6 ft 9 in (2.06 m)	215 lb (98 kg)	So	San Bernardino, California
C	41	Ed Stokes	7 ft 0 in (2.13 m)	255 lb (116 kg)	Sr	Los Angeles, California
F	42	Chris Mills	6 ft 9 in (2.06 m)	210 lb (95 kg)	Sr	Los Angeles, California
G	44	Reggie Geary	6 ft 2 in (1.88 m)	180 lb (82 kg)	Fr	Santa Ana, California
F/C	50	Joseph Blair	6 ft 11 in (2.11 m)	260 lb (118 kg)	Fr	Houston, Texas

Head coach

- Lute Olson (Augsburg)

Assistant coach(es)

Legend

- (C) Team captain
- (S) Suspended
- (I) Ineligible
- (W) Walk-on
- Injured
- Current redshirt

== Schedule and results ==
Date time, TV	Rank^{#}	Opponent^{#}	Result	Record	Site city, state
Regular Season
Dec 6, 1992*	No. 9	Arkansas	L 80–86	0–1	McKale Center; Tucson, Arizona
Dec 8, 1992*	No. 14	New Mexico	W 89–70	1–1	McKale Center; Tucson, Arizona
Dec 12, 1992*	No. 14	Utah	W 78–64	2–1	McKale Center; Tucson, Arizona
Dec 22, 1992*	No. 14	at Providence	L 66–81	2–2	Dunkin' Donuts Center; Providence, Rhode Island
Dec 28, 1992*	No. 22	Delaware State; Valley Bank Fiesta Bowl Classic	W 92–52	3–2	McKale Center; Tucson, Arizona
Dec 30, 1992*	No. 22	West Virginia; Valley Bank Fiesta Bowl Classic	W 75–74	4–2	McKale Center; Tucson, Arizona
Jan 2, 1993*	No. 22	Rhode Island	W 87–79	5–2	McKale Center; Tucson, Arizona
Jan 7, 1993	No. 20	at No. 15 UCLA	W 82–80	6–2 (1–0)	Pauley Pavilion; Los Angeles, California
Jan 9, 1993	No. 20	at USC	W 81–73	7–2 (2–0)	L.A. Sports Arena; Los Angeles, California
Jan 14, 1993	No. 12	Washington	W 93–76	8–2 (3–0)	McKale Center; Tucson, Arizona
Jan 16, 1993	No. 12	Washington	W 87–63	9–2 (4–0)	McKale Center; Tucson, Arizona
Jan 20, 1993	No. 11	at Arizona State	W 91–87	10–2 (5–0)	Wells Fargo Arena; Tempe, Arizona
Jan 23, 1993*	No. 11	at New Orleans	W 72–69	11–2	Lakefront Arena; New Orleans, Louisiana
Jan 28, 1993	No. 8	at Oregon	W 92–60	12–2 (6–0)	McArthur Court; Eugene, Oregon
Jan 30, 1993	No. 8	at Oregon State	W 57–54	13–2 (7–0)	Gill Coliseum; Corvallis, Oregon
Feb 4, 1993	No. 8	Stanford	W 96–61	14–2 (8–0)	McKale Center; Tucson, Arizona
Feb 7, 1993	No. 8	California	W 93–81	15–2 (9–0)	McKale Center; Tucson, Arizona
Feb 11, 1993	No. 5	at Washington State	W 70–64	16–2 (10–0)	Friel Court; Pullman, Washington
Feb 13, 1993	No. 5	at Washington	W 81–72	17–2 (11–0)	Bank of America Arena; Seattle, Washington
Feb 18, 1993	No. 4	Arizona State	W 116–80	18–2 (12–0)	McKale Center; Tucson, Arizona
Feb 21, 1993*	No. 4	vs. No. 8 Cincinnati; 7-Up Shootout	W 70–60	19–2	Phoenix, Arizona
Feb 25, 1993	No. 4	Oregon State	W 81–70	20–2 (13–0)	McKale Center; Tucson, Arizona
Feb 27, 1993	No. 4	Oregon	W 99–68	21–2 (14–0)	McKale Center; Tucson, Arizona
Mar 4, 1993	No. 3	vs. California	L 71–74	21–3 (14–1)	Oakland Coliseum; Oakland, California
Mar 7, 1993	No. 3	at Stanford	W 94–80	22–3 (15–1)	Maples Pavilion; Stanford, California
Mar 11, 1993	No. 6	USC	W 87–76	23–3 (16–1)	McKale Center; Tucson, Arizona
Mar 13, 1993*	No. 6	UCLA	W 99–80	24–3 (17–1)	McKale Center; Tucson, Arizona
NCAA Tournament
Mar 18, 1993*	(2 W) No. 5	vs. (15 W) Santa Clara; First Round	L 61–64	24–4	Jon M. Huntsman Center; Salt Lake City, Utah
*Non-conference game. ^{#}Rankings from AP Poll. (#) Tournament seedings in parentheses. W=West.

=== NCAA basketball tournament ===
- West
  - Arizona (#2 seed) 61, Santa Clara (#15 Seed) 64

== Team players drafted into the NBA ==
Round	Pick	Player	NBA club
1	22	Chris Mills	Cleveland Cavaliers
2	35	Ed Stokes	Miami Heat
