= 1993 Ohio Valley Conference men's basketball tournament =

- Classification: Division I
- Season: 1992–93
- Teams: 6
- Site: Rupp Arena; Lexington, Kentucky
- Champions: Tennessee State (1st title)
- Winning coach: Frankie Allen (1st title)
- MVP: Carlos Rogers (Tennessee State)

1992–93 Ohio Valley Conference men's basketball standings
	Conf.				Overall
Team	W		L	PCT	W		L	PCT
Tennessee State †	13	–	3	.813	19	–	10	.655
Eastern Kentucky	11	–	5	.688	15	–	12	.556
Murray State	11	–	5	.688	18	–	12	.600
Tennessee Tech	9	–	7	.563	15	–	13	.536
Southeast Missouri State	9	–	7	.563	16	–	11	.593
Morehead State	6	–	10	.375	6	–	21	.222
Middle Tennessee	5	–	11	.313	10	–	16	.385
Austin Peay	4	–	12	.250	7	–	20	.259
UT Martin	4	–	12	.250	7	–	19	.269
† 1993 OVC tournament winner Rankings from AP Poll

The 1993 Ohio Valley Conference men's basketball tournament was the final event of the 1992–93 season in the Ohio Valley Conference. The tournament was held March 4–6, 1993, at Rupp Arena in Lexington, Kentucky.

Tennessee State defeated Murray State in the championship game, 82–68, to win their first OVC men's basketball tournament.

The Tigers received an automatic bid to the 1993 NCAA tournament as the No. 15 seed in the Southeast region.

== Format ==
Six of the nine conference members participated in the tournament field. They were seeded based on regular season conference records, with the top two seeds (Tennessee State and Eastern Kentucky) receiving a bye to the semifinal round. The teams were re-seeded after the opening round. Middle Tennessee, Southeast Missouri State, and Tennessee-Martin did not participate.

== Bracket ==
Quarterfinals; Tuesday, March 4
4	Tennessee Tech	97
5	Morehead State	89
(Pairings are reseeded after the first round)
3	Murray State	82
6	Austin Peay	68

Semifinals; Wednesday, March 5
1	Tennessee State	77
4	Tennessee Tech	71
3	Murray State	74
2	Eastern Kentucky	73

Championship; Thursday, March 6
1	Tennessee State	82
3	Murray State	68
