= 1992–93 Arkansas Razorbacks men's basketball team =

American college basketball season

1992–93 Arkansas Razorbacks men's basketball

SEC West Division Champions

NCAA tournament, Sweet Sixteen
- Conference: Southeastern Conference
- West

Ranking
- Coaches: No. 10
- AP: No. 12
- Record: 22–9 (10–6 SEC)
- Head coach: Nolan Richardson (8th season)
- Assistant coaches: Mike Anderson (8th season); Nolan Richardson III; Brad Dunn
- Home arena: Barnhill Arena

1992–93 Southeastern Conference men's basketball standings
| | Conf. | | | | Overall |
| Team | W | | L | PCT | W | | L | PCT |
|---|---|---|---|---|---|---|---|---|
East
| No. 8 Vanderbilt | 14 | – | 2 | .875 | 28 | – | 6 | .824 |
| No. 2 Kentucky † | 13 | – | 3 | .813 | 30 | – | 4 | .882 |
| Florida | 9 | – | 7 | .563 | 16 | – | 12 | .571 |
| Georgia | 8 | – | 8 | .500 | 15 | – | 14 | .517 |
| South Carolina | 5 | – | 11 | .313 | 9 | – | 18 | .333 |
| Tennessee | 4 | – | 12 | .250 | 13 | – | 17 | .433 |
West
| No. 12 Arkansas | 10 | – | 6 | .625 | 22 | – | 9 | .710 |
| LSU | 9 | – | 7 | .563 | 22 | – | 11 | .667 |
| Auburn | 8 | – | 8 | .500 | 15 | – | 12 | .556 |
| Alabama | 7 | – | 9 | .438 | 16 | – | 13 | .552 |
| Mississippi State | 5 | – | 11 | .313 | 13 | – | 16 | .448 |
| Ole Miss | 4 | – | 12 | .250 | 10 | – | 18 | .357 |
† 1993 SEC tournament winner Rankings from AP poll

The 1992–93 Arkansas Razorbacks men's basketball team represented the University of Arkansas as a member of the Southeastern Conference during the 1992–93 college basketball season. The head coach was Nolan Richardson, serving for his eighth year. The team played its home games in Barnhill Arena in Fayetteville, Arkansas. This was the last year that the Razorbacks would play in Barnhill Arena. The Razorbacks were the 1993 SEC West Division Champions. Senior guard Robert Shepherd was named 1st Team SEC, and freshman forward Corliss Williamson was named to the SEC All-Freshman Team. The Hogs defeated Holy Cross and St. John's in the first and second rounds, respectively, of the NCAA tournament, before losing to eventual national champions North Carolina Tarheels in the Sweet 16. This team was dubbed "Richardson's Runts" because Dwight Stewart was the tallest player on the team at 6'9".

== Roster ==
1992–93 Arkansas Razorbacks men's basketball team
Players
Coaches

| Pos. | # | Name | Height | Weight | Year | Hometown |
|---|---|---|---|---|---|---|
| G | 20 | Robert Shepherd | 6 ft 1 in (1.85 m) | 175 lb (79 kg) | Sr | Chicago, Illinois |
| G | 12 | Clint McDaniel | 6 ft 4 in (1.93 m) | 185 lb (84 kg) | So | Tulsa, Oklahoma |
| G | 14 | Corey Beck | 6 ft 2 in (1.88 m) | 210 lb (95 kg) | So | Memphis, Tennessee |
| F/C | 15 | Dwight Stewart | 6 ft 9 in (2.06 m) | 265 lb (120 kg) | So | Memphis, Tennessee |
| G | 30 | Scotty Thurman | 6 ft 6 in (1.98 m) | 210 lb (95 kg) | Fr | Ruston, Louisiana |
| F | 34 | Corliss Williamson | 6 ft 7 in (2.01 m) | 235 lb (107 kg) | Fr | Russellville, Arkansas |
| F | 21 | Darrell Hawkins | 6 ft 5 in (1.96 m) | 200 lb (91 kg) | Sr | Prairie View, Texas |
| G | 31 | Roger Crawford | 6 ft 4 in (1.93 m) | 175 lb (79 kg) | Jr | Birmingham, Alabama |
| G | 3 | Warren Linn | 6 ft 5 in (1.96 m) | 185 lb (84 kg) | Sr | Tulsa, Oklahoma |
| F | 40 | Elmer Martin | 6 ft 8 in (2.03 m) | 220 lb (100 kg) | So | Memphis, Tennessee |
| F | 23 | Ken Biley | 6 ft 6 in (1.98 m) | 205 lb (93 kg) | Jr | Pine Bluff, Arkansas |
| G | 22 | Davor Rimac | 6 ft 7 in (2.01 m) | 210 lb (95 kg) | So | Zagreb, Croatia |
| F | 24 | Ray Biggers | 6 ft 8 in (2.03 m) | 200 lb (91 kg) | So | Houston, Texas |
| G | 35 | Reggie Merritt | 6 ft 1 in (1.85 m) | 165 lb (75 kg) | Fr | Little Rock, Arkansas |

Head coach

- Nolan Richardson (UTEP)

Assistant coach(es)

- Mike Anderson (Tulsa)
- Nolan Richardson III (Langston)
- Brad Dunn

Legend

- (C) Team captain
- (S) Suspended
- (I) Ineligible
- (W) Walk-on
- Injured
- Current redshirt

== Schedule and results ==
| Date time, TV | Rank^{#} | Opponent^{#} | Result | Record | Site city, state |
Regular season
| Dec 2, 1992*; ESPN | | No. 8 Memphis State | W 81–76 | 1–0 | Barnhill Arena (9,386); Fayetteville, Arkansas |
| Dec 3, 1992* | | Tennessee-Martin | W 90–69 | 2–0 | Barnhill Arena (9,216); Fayetteville, Arkansas |
| Dec 6, 1992* | | at No. 9 Arizona | W 86–80 | 3–0 | McKale Center (13,997); Tucson, Arizona |
| Dec 17, 1992* | No. 12 | vs. Southeast Missouri State | W 96–72 | 4–0 | Pine Bluff Convention Center (7,386); Pine Bluff, Arkansas |
| Dec 19, 1992* | No. 12 | at Missouri | W 73–68 | 5–0 | Hearnes Center (13,349); Columbia, Missouri |
| Dec 21, 1992* | No. 10 | vs. Jackson State | W 123–76 | 6–0 | Pine Bluff Convention Center (7,542); Pine Bluff, Arkansas |
| Dec 23, 1992* | No. 10 | Tulsa | W 101–87 | 7–0 | Barnhill Arena (9,346); Fayetteville, Arkansas |
| Dec 28, 1992* | No. 9 | vs. Coastal Carolina | W 93–74 | 8–0 | Barton Coliseum (7,386); Little Rock, Arkansas |
| Dec 30, 1992* | No. 9 | vs. Northeast Louisiana | L 78–87 | 8–1 | Barton Coliseum (7,959); Little Rock, Arkansas |
| Jan 4, 1993* | No. 13 | at SMU | W 72–53 | 9–1 | Moody Coliseum; Dallas, Texas |
| Jan 6, 1993 | No. 13 | Ole Miss | W 90–78 | 10–1 (1–0) | Barnhill Arena; Fayetteville, Arkansas |
| Jan 9, 1993 | No. 13 | at South Carolina | W 86–76 | 11–1 (2–0) | Carolina Coliseum (8,451); Columbia, South Carolina |
| Jan 12, 1993 | No. 9 | Alabama | W 74–66 | 12–1 (3–0) | Barnhill Arena (9,492); Fayetteville, Arkansas |
| Jan 20, 1993 | No. 8 | at No. 19 Vanderbilt | L 89–102 | 12–2 (3–1) | Memorial Gymnasium; Nashville, Tennessee |
| Jan 23, 1993 | No. 8 | Auburn | L 89–100 | 12–3 (3–2) | Barnhill Arena; Fayetteville, Arkansas |
| Jan 27, 1993 | No. 16 | at Mississippi State | L 76–80 ^{OT} | 12–4 (3–3) | Humphrey Coliseum (6,849); Starkville, Mississippi |
| Jan 30, 1993 | No. 16 | Georgia | W 97–79 | 13–4 (4–3) | Barnhill Arena (9,488); Fayetteville, Arkansas |
| Feb 2, 1993; ESPN | No. 17 | at LSU | W 91–79 | 14–4 (5–3) | Maravich Assembly Center (12,358); Baton Rouge, Louisiana |
| Feb 6, 1993 | No. 17 | at Florida | W 74–66 | 15–4 (6–3) | Stephen C. O'Connell Center; Gainesville, Florida |
| Feb 10, 1993* | No. 14 | No. 2 Kentucky | W 101–94 | 16–4 (7–3) | Barnhill Arena; Fayetteville, Arkansas |
| Feb 13, 1993 | No. 14 | at Alabama | L 82–93 | 16–5 (7–4) | Coleman Coliseum (15,043); Tuscaloosa, Alabama |
| Feb 16, 1993 | No. 13 | Tennessee | L 91–101 | 16–6 (7–5) | Barnhill Arena (9,442); Fayetteville, Arkansas |
| Feb 20, 1993 | No. 13 | Mississippi State | W 115–58 | 17–6 (8–5) | Barnhill Arena (9,368); Fayetteville, Arkansas |
| Feb 27, 1993 | No. 15 | at Ole Miss | W 85–63 | 18–6 (9–5) | Tad Smith Coliseum (6,321); Oxford, Mississippi |
| Mar 3, 1993*; 7:00 p.m., JPS | No. 13 | LSU | W 88–75 | 19–6 (10–5) | Barnhill Arena; Fayetteville, AR |
| Mar 6, 1993* | No. 13 | at Auburn | L 80–81 | 19–7 (10–6) | Beard–Eaves–Memorial (11,445); Auburn, AL |
SEC Tournament
| Mar 12, 1993*; JPS | No. 14 | vs. Georgia; SEC Tournament Quarterfinal | W 65–60 | 20–7 | Rupp Arena (22,165); Lexington, KY |
| Mar 13, 1993*; JPS | No. 14 | at No. 4 Kentucky; SEC Tournament Semifinal | L 81–92 | 20–8 | Rupp Arena (23,623); Lexington, KY |
NCAA Tournament
| Mar 18, 1993* | (4 E) No. 12 | vs. (13 E) Holy Cross; First round | W 94–64 | 21–8 | Lawrence Joel Coliseum (14,366); Winston-Salem, NC |
| Mar 20, 1993* | (4 E) No. 12 | vs. (5 E) St. John's; Second Round | W 80–74 | 22–8 | Lawrence Joel Coliseum (14,366); Winston-Salem, NC |
| Mar 26, 1993*; CBS | (4 E) No. 12 | vs. (1 E) No. 4 North Carolina; East Regional semifinal | L 74–80 | 22–9 | Brendan Byrne Arena (19,761); East Rutherford, NJ |
*Non-conference game. ^{#}Rankings from AP Poll. (#) Tournament seedings in parentheses. E=East.
