= 1992–93 New Mexico Lobos men's basketball team =

American college basketball season

1992–93 New Mexico Lobos men's basketball

WAC tournament champions

NCAA tournament
- Conference: Western Athletic Conference

Ranking
- AP: No. 21
- Record: 24–7 (13–5 WAC)
- Head coach: Dave Bliss (5th season)
- Home arena: University Arena

1992–93 WAC men's basketball standings
	Conf.				Overall
Team	W		L	PCT	W		L	PCT
No. 19 Utah	15	–	3	.833	24	–	7	.774
BYU	15	–	3	.833	25	–	9	.735
No. 21 New Mexico †	13	–	5	.722	24	–	7	.774
UTEP	10	–	8	.556	21	–	13	.618
Colorado State	9	–	9	.500	17	–	12	.586
Fresno State	8	–	10	.444	13	–	15	.464
Hawaii	7	–	11	.389	12	–	16	.429
Wyoming	7	–	11	.389	13	–	15	.464
San Diego State	3	–	15	.167	8	–	21	.276
Air Force	3	–	15	.167	9	–	19	.321
† 1993 WAC tournament winner Rankings from AP Poll

The 1992–93 New Mexico Lobos men's basketball team represented the University of New Mexico as a member of the Western Athletic Conference. The Lobos were coached by head coach Dave Bliss and played their home games at the University Arena, also known as "The Pit", in Albuquerque, New Mexico.

== Roster ==
1992–93 New Mexico Lobos men's basketball team
Players
Coaches

Pos.	#	Name	Height	Weight	Year	Hometown
G	12	Greg Brown	5 ft 7 in (1.7 m)	140 lb (64 kg)	Jr	Albuquerque, New Mexico
G		Steve Logan	6 ft 1 in (1.85 m)	—	Sr
G		Ike Williams	6 ft 4 in (1.93 m)	—	Sr
F	33	Khari Jaxon	6 ft 8 in (2.03 m)	—	Sr	Los Angeles, California

Head coach

- Dave Bliss

Assistant coach(es)

Legend

- (C) Team captain
- (S) Suspended
- (I) Ineligible
- (W) Walk-on
- Injured
- Current redshirt

== Schedule and results ==
Date time, TV	Rank^{#}	Opponent^{#}	Result	Record	Site (attendance) city, state
Regular season
Dec 1, 1992*		New Mexico Highlands	W 89–54	1–0	University Arena; Albuquerque, New Mexico
Dec 3, 1992*		Texas A&M	W 71–69	2–0	University Arena; Albuquerque, New Mexico
Dec 8, 1992*		at No. 14 Arizona	L 70–89	2–1	McKale Center; Tucson, Arizona
Dec 12, 1992*		at New Mexico State	W 69–62	3–1	Pan American Center; Las Cruces, New Mexico
Dec 20, 1992*		Texas Tech	W 96–75	4–1	University Arena; Albuquerque, New Mexico
Dec 23, 1992*		New Mexico State	W 71–66	5–1	University Arena; Albuquerque, New Mexico
Dec 28, 1992*		William & Mary	W 64–59	6–1	University Arena; Albuquerque, New Mexico
Dec 29, 1992*		Penn	W 54–51	7–1	University Arena; Albuquerque, New Mexico
Mar 6, 1993		No. 21 BYU	W 79–76	21–6 (13–5)	University Arena; Albuquerque, New Mexico
WAC tournament
Mar 11, 1993*	(3)	vs. (6) Fresno State; Quarterfinals	W 72–48	22–6	Delta Center; Salt Lake City, Utah
Mar 12, 1993*	(3)	vs. (2) No. 25 BYU; Semifinals	W 69–59	23–6	Delta Center; Salt Lake City, Utah
Mar 13, 1993*	(3)	vs. (4) UTEP; Championship	W 76–65	24–6	Delta Center; Salt Lake City, Utah
NCAA tournament
Mar 19, 1993*	(5 W) No. 21	vs. (12 W) George Washington; First round	L 68–82	24–7	McKale Center; Tucson, Arizona
*Non-conference game. ^{#}Rankings from AP poll. (#) Tournament seedings in parentheses. W=West.
