= 1992–93 Kentucky Wildcats men's basketball team =

1992–93 season of University of Kentucky men's basketball team

1992–93 Kentucky Wildcats men's basketball
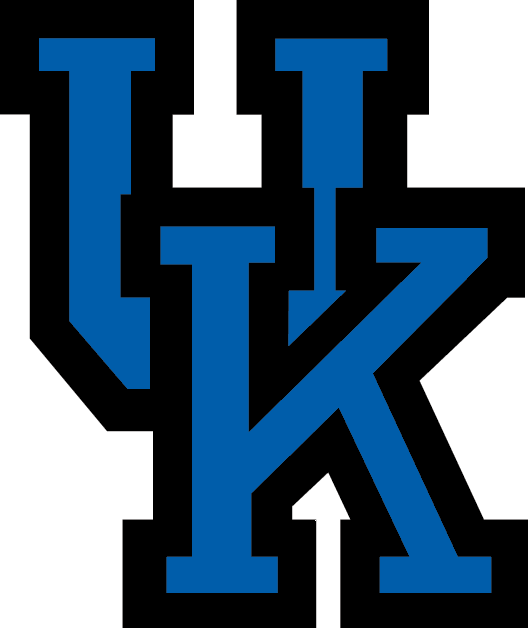

SEC tournament champions

NCAA tournament, Final Four
- Conference: Southeastern Conference

Ranking
- Coaches: No. 3
- AP: No. 2
- Record: 30–4 (13–3 SEC)
- Head coach: Rick Pitino (4th season)
- Assistant coaches: Herb Sendek; Billy Donovan; Bernadette Locke-Mattox
- Home arena: Rupp Arena

1992–93 Southeastern Conference men's basketball standings
	Conf.				Overall
Team	W		L	PCT	W		L	PCT
East
No. 8 Vanderbilt	14	–	2	.875	28	–	6	.824
No. 2 Kentucky †	13	–	3	.813	30	–	4	.882
Florida	9	–	7	.563	16	–	12	.571
Georgia	8	–	8	.500	15	–	14	.517
South Carolina	5	–	11	.313	9	–	18	.333
Tennessee	4	–	12	.250	13	–	17	.433
West
No. 12 Arkansas	10	–	6	.625	22	–	9	.710
LSU	9	–	7	.563	22	–	11	.667
Auburn	8	–	8	.500	15	–	12	.556
Alabama	7	–	9	.438	16	–	13	.552
Mississippi State	5	–	11	.313	13	–	16	.448
Ole Miss	4	–	12	.250	10	–	18	.357
† 1993 SEC tournament winner Rankings from AP poll

The 1992–93 Kentucky Wildcats men's basketball team represented University of Kentucky in the 1992–93 NCAA Division I men's basketball season. The head coach was Rick Pitino and the team finished the season with an overall record of 30–4. Kentucky was invited as a #1 seed in the 1993 NCAA Tournament. The Wildcats advanced all the way to the Final Four before losing in the semifinals to Michigan 81–78.

== Roster ==
1992–93 Kentucky Wildcats men's basketball team
Players
Coaches

Pos.	#	Name	Height	Weight	Year	Previous school	Hometown
PG	5	Travis Ford	5 ft 9 in (1.75 m)	165 lb (75 kg)	Jr	Madisonville North Hopkins	Madisonville, Kentucky
SF	24	Jamal Mashburn	6 ft 8 in (2.03 m)	235 lb (107 kg)	Jr	Cardinal Hayes	The Bronx, New York

Head coach

- Rick Pitino (UMass)

Assistant coach(es)

Legend

- (C) Team captain
- (S) Suspended
- (I) Ineligible
- (W) Walk-on
- Injured
- Current redshirt

== Schedule and results ==
Date time, TV	Rank^{#}	Opponent^{#}	Result	Record	Site city, state
Regular Season
December 2, 1992*; UKTV	No. 5	Wright State	W 81–65	1–0	Rupp Arena; Lexington, Kentucky
December 5, 1992*; 7:30 p.m., ESPN	No. 5	No. 13 Georgia Tech	W 96–87	2–0	Rupp Arena; Lexington, Kentucky
December 8, 1992*; UKTV	No. 3	Eastern Kentucky	W 82–73	3–0	Rupp Arena; Lexington, Kentucky
December 12, 1992*; 8:30 p.m., ESPN	No. 3	at No. 9 Louisville; Rivalry	W 88–68	4–0	Freedom Hall; Louisville, Kentucky
December 19, 1992*	No. 3	Morehead State	W 108–65	5–0	Rupp Arena; Lexington, Kentucky
December 22, 1992*	No. 3	Miami (OH)	W 65–49	6–0	Rupp Arena; Lexington, Kentucky
December 28, 1992*	No. 3	vs. Rutgers; ECAC Holiday Festival	W 89–67	7–0	Madison Square Garden; New York, New York
December 30, 1992*	No. 3	at St. John's; ECAC Holiday Festival	W 86–77	8–0	Madison Square Garden; New York, New York
January 3, 1993*; 1:00 p.m., CBS	No. 3	vs. No. 4 Indiana; Rivalry	W 81–78	9–0	Freedom Hall; Louisville, Kentucky
January 5, 1993; 9:30 p.m., ESPN	No. 2	at Georgia	W 74–59	10–0 (1–0)	Stegeman Coliseum; Athens, Georgia
January 9, 1993; UKTV	No. 2	Tennessee	W 84–70	11–0 (2–0)	Rupp Arena; Lexington, Kentucky
January 13, 1993; UKTV	No. 1	at Vanderbilt	L 86–101	11–1 (2–1)	Memorial Gymnasium; Nashville, Tennessee
January 19, 1993; 9:30 p.m., ESPN	No. 4	at Alabama	W 73–59	12–1 (3–1)	Coleman Coliseum; Tuscaloosa, Alabama
January 23, 1993; 2:00 p.m., JP	No. 4	at South Carolina	W 108–82	13–1 (4–1)	Carolina Coliseum; Columbia, South Carolina
January 26, 1993; 9:30 p.m., ESPN	No. 4	LSU	W 105–67	14–1 (5–1)	Rupp Arena; Lexington, Kentucky
January 30, 1993	No. 4	Florida; Rivalry	W 71–48	15–1 (6–1)	Rupp Arena; Lexington, Kentucky
February 3, 1993; 8:00 p.m., JP	No. 2	Mississippi State	W 87–63	16–1 (7–1)	Rupp Arena; Lexington, Kentucky
February 6, 1993; 3:30 p.m., JP	No. 2	No. 11 Vanderbilt	W 82–67	17–1 (8–1)	Rupp Arena; Lexington, Kentucky
February 10, 1993; 8:00 p.m., JP	No. 2	at Arkansas			Bud Walton Arena; Fayetteville, Arkansas
February 13, 1993*; 2:00 p.m., NBC	No. 2	at Notre Dame			South Bend, Indiana
February 24, 1993; 8:00 p.m., JP	No. 2	at Tennessee	L 77–78		Thompson-Boiling Arena; Knoxville, Tennessee
March 3, 1993; 8:00 p.m., JP	No. 2	at Ole Miss			Tad Smith Coliseum; Oxford, Mississippi
March 7, 1993; ABC	No. 5	at Florida; Rivalry	W 85–77	23–3 (13–3)	Stephen C. O'Connell Center; Gainesville, Florida
SEC Tournament
March 12, 1993*; JP	(E2) No. 4	(E6) Tennessee; SEC Tournament Quarterfinal	W 101–40	24–3	Rupp Arena; Lexington, Kentucky
March 13, 1993*; JP	(E2) No. 4	(W1) No. 14 Arkansas; SEC Tournament Semifinal	W 92–81	25–3	Rupp Arena; Lexington, Kentucky
March 14, 1993*; JP	(E2) No. 4	(W2) LSU; SEC tournament championship	W 82–65	26–3	Rupp Arena; Lexington, Kentucky
NCAA Tournament
March 19, 1993*	(1 SE) No. 4	vs. (16 SE) Rider; First round	W 96–52	27–3	Memorial Gymnasium; Nashville, Tennessee
March 21, 1993*	(1 SE) No. 4	vs. (8 SE) No. 19 Utah; Second Round	W 83–62	28–3	Memorial Gymnasium; Nashville, Tennessee
March 25, 1993*; CBS	(1 SE) No. 4	vs. (5 SE) No. 16 Wake Forest; Southeast Regional semifinal – Sweet Sixteen	W 103–69	29–3	Charlotte Coliseum; Charlotte, North Carolina
March 27, 1993*; CBS	(1 SE) No. 4	vs. (3 SE) No. 11 Florida State; Southeast Regional Final – Elite Eight	W 106–81	30–3	Charlotte Coliseum; Charlotte, North Carolina
April 3, 1993*; CBS	(1 SE) No. 4	vs. No. 3 Michigan; National semifinal – Final Four	L 78–81 ^{OT}	30–4	Louisiana Superdome; New Orleans, Louisiana
*Non-conference game. ^{#}Rankings from AP poll. (#) Tournament seedings in parentheses. SE=Southeast. All times are in Eastern Standard Time.

== Awards and honors ==
- Jamal Mashburn – Consensus First-team All-American, SEC Player of the Year

== NBA draft ==
Round	Pick	Player	NBA club
1	4	Jamal Mashburn	Dallas Mavericks
