= 1992–93 California Golden Bears men's basketball team =

American college basketball season

1992–93 California Golden Bears men's basketball

NCAA tournament, Sweet Sixteen
- Conference: Pacific-10 Conference

Ranking
- Coaches: No. 17
- Record: 21–9 (12–6 Pac-10)
- Head coach: Lou Campanelli (10–7) (7th season) (1st season); Todd Bozeman (11–2)
- Home arena: Harmon Gym

1992–93 Pacific-10 Conference men's basketball standings
	Conf.				Overall
Team	W		L	PCT	W		L	PCT
No. 5 Arizona	17	–	1	.944	24	–	4	.857
California	12	–	6	.667	21	–	9	.700
UCLA	11	–	7	.611	22	–	11	.667
Arizona State	11	–	7	.611	18	–	10	.643
USC	9	–	9	.500	18	–	12	.600
Oregon State	9	–	9	.500	13	–	14	.481
Washington	7	–	11	.389	13	–	14	.481
Washington State	9	–	9	.500	15	–	12	.556
Oregon	3	–	15	.167	10	–	20	.333
Stanford	2	–	16	.111	7	–	23	.233
Rankings from AP Poll

The 1992–93 California Golden Bears men's basketball team represented the University of California, Berkeley as a member of the Pacific-10 Conference during the 1992–93 season.

Led by acting head coach Todd Bozeman, the Bears finished the season with a record of 21–9, and a record of 12–6 in the Pac-10, placing them second. The Bears received an at-large bid to the NCAA tournament where they made a run to the Sweet Sixteen before falling to Kansas in the Midwest regional semifinals.

== Roster ==
1992–93 California Golden Bears men's basketball team
Players
Coaches

Pos.	#	Name	Height	Weight	Year	Hometown
G	5	Jason Kidd	6 ft 4 in (1.93 m)	200 lb (91 kg)	Fr	St. Joseph Notre Dame	San Francisco, CA
F	21	Lamond Murray	6 ft 7 in (2.01 m)	236 lb (107 kg)	So	John F. Kennedy	Pasadena, CA

Head coach

- Todd Bozeman

Assistant coach(es)

Legend

- (C) Team captain
- (S) Suspended
- (I) Ineligible
- (W) Walk-on
- Injured
- Current redshirt

== Schedule and results ==
Date time, TV	Rank^{#}	Opponent^{#}	Result	Record	Site city, state
Regular season
Dec 1, 1992*		Sacramento State	W 89–65	1–0	Harmon Gym; Berkeley, California
Dec 5, 1992*		Oklahoma State	W 80–65	2–0	Harmon Gym; Berkeley, California
Dec 7, 1992*		at San Francisco	W 89–79	3–0	War Memorial Gymnasium; San Francisco, California
Dec 20, 1992*	No. 25	at Santa Clara	W 80–73	4–0	Toso Pavilion; Santa Clara, California
Dec 22, 1992*	No. 21	Wake Forest	W 81–65	5–0	Harmon Gym; Berkeley, California
Dec 29, 1992*	No. 19	vs. James Madison; Seton Hall Meadowlands Classic	L 75–90	5–1	Brendan Byrne Arena; East Rutherford, New Jersey
Dec 30, 1992*	No. 19	vs. Cornell; Seton Hall Meadowlands Classic	L 54–74	5–2	Brendan Byrne Arena; East Rutherford, New Jersey
Jan 3, 1993*		Texas Southern	W 84–69	6–2	Harmon Gym; Berkeley, California
Jan 7, 1993		Oregon	W 82–65	7–2 (1–0)	Harmon Gym; Berkeley, California
Jan 9, 1993		Oregon State	L 63–64	7–3 (1–1)	Harmon Gym; Berkeley, California
Jan 14, 1993		Stanford	W 83–66	8–3 (2–1)	Harmon Gym; Berkeley, California
Jan 21, 1993		at USC	L 65–67	8–4 (2–2)	L.A. Sports Arena; Los Angeles, California
Jan 24, 1993		at No. 23 UCLA	W 104–82	9–4 (3–2)	Pauley Pavilion; Los Angeles, California
Jan 28, 1993		Washington	W 79–65	10–4 (4–2)	Harmon Gym; Berkeley, California
Jan 30, 1993		Washington State	L 75–83	10–5 (4–3)	Harmon Gym; Berkeley, California
Feb 4, 1993		at Arizona State	L 83–90	10–6 (4–4)	Wells Fargo Arena; Tempe, Arizona
Feb 7, 1993		at No. 8 Arizona	L 81–93	10–7 (4–5)	McKale Center; Tucson, Arizona
Feb 10, 1993*		Cal State Northridge	W 92–68	11–7	Harmon Gym; Berkeley, California
Feb 14, 1993		at Stanford	W 86–61	12–7 (5–5)	Maples Pavilion; Stanford, California
Feb 18, 1993		USC	W 86–83	13–7 (6–5)	Harmon Gym; Berkeley, California
Feb 20, 1993		UCLA	L 71–85	13–8 (6–6)	Harmon Gym; Berkeley, California
Feb 25, 1993		at Washington State	W 76–67	14–8 (7–6)	Friel Court; Pullman, Washington
Feb 27, 1993		at Washington	W 76–75	15–8 (8–6)	Bank of America Arena; Seattle, Washington
Mar 4, 1993		vs. No. 3 Arizona	W 74–71	16–8 (9–6)	Oakland Coliseum; Oakland, California
Mar 6, 1993		vs. Arizona State	W 91–67	17–8 (10–6)	Oakland Coliseum; Oakland, California
Mar 11, 1993		at Oregon State	W 78–72	18–8 (11–6)	Gill Coliseum; Corvallis, Oregon
Mar 13, 1993		at Oregon	W 79–76	19–8 (12–6)	McArthur Court; Eugene, Oregon
NCAA Tournament
Mar 18, 1993*	(6 MW)	vs. (11 MW) LSU; First round	W 66–64	20–8	Rosemont Horizon; Rosemont, Illinois
Mar 20, 1993*	(6 MW)	vs. (3 MW) No. 10 Duke; Second Round	W 82–77	21–8	Rosemont Horizon; Rosemont, Illinois
Mar 25, 1993*	(6 MW)	vs. (2 MW) No. 9 Kansas; Midwest Regional semifinal	L 76–93	21–9	St. Louis Arena; St. Louis, Missouri
*Non-conference game. ^{#}Rankings from AP Poll. (#) Tournament seedings in parentheses. MW=Midwest. All times are in Eastern.
