= 1992–93 Memphis State Tigers men's basketball team =

American college basketball season

1992–93 Memphis State Tigers men's basketball

NCAA tournament, first round
- Conference: Great Midwest Conference
- Record: 20–12 (7–3 Great Midwest)
- Head coach: Larry Finch (7th season)
- Home arena: Pyramid Arena

1992–93 Great Midwest Conference men's basketball standings
	Conf.				Overall
Team	W		L	PCT	W		L	PCT
No. 7 Cincinnati †	8	–	2	.800	27	–	5	.844
Memphis State	7	–	3	.700	20	–	12	.625
Marquette	6	–	4	.600	20	–	8	.714
UAB	5	–	5	.500	21	–	14	.600
DePaul	3	–	7	.300	16	–	15	.516
Saint Louis	1	–	9	.100	12	–	17	.414
† 1993 GMC tournament winner Rankings from AP Poll

The 1992–93 Memphis State Tigers men's basketball team represented Memphis State University as a member of the Great Midwest Conference during the 1992–93 NCAA Division I men's basketball season. The Tigers were led by head coach Larry Finch and played their home games at the Pyramid Arena in Memphis, Tennessee.

The Tigers received an at-large bid to the 1992 NCAA tournament as No. 10 seed in the Southeast region. Memphis State fell to No. 7 seed Western Kentucky in the opening round. The team finished with a 20–12 record (7–3 Great Midwest).

== Roster ==
1992–93 Memphis State Tigers men's basketball team
Players
Coaches

Pos.	#	Name	Height	Weight	Year	Previous school	Hometown
G	12	Leon Mitchell	6 ft 3 in (1.91 m)	175 lb (79 kg)	Jr	Overton	Memphis, Tennessee
G	14	Chris Haynes	6 ft 5 in (1.96 m)	179 lb (81 kg)	So	Briarcrest	Memphis, Tennessee
G	15	Marcus Nolan	6 ft 2 in (1.88 m)	171 lb (78 kg)	So	Hamilton	Memphis, Tennessee
G	20	Tony Madlock	6 ft 1 in (1.85 m)	185 lb (84 kg)	So	Melrose	Memphis, Tennessee
G	25	Penny Hardaway	6 ft 7 in (2.01 m)	187 lb (85 kg)	Jr	Treadwell	Memphis, Tennessee
F	31	Kelvin Allen	6 ft 7 in (2.01 m)	220 lb (100 kg)	Sr	Bolivar Central	Bolivar, Tennessee
G	35	Billy Smith	6 ft 5 in (1.96 m)	200 lb (91 kg)	Sr	East	Memphis, Tennessee
F	50	David Vaughn	6 ft 9 in (2.06 m)	232 lb (105 kg)	So	Whites Creek	Whites Creek, Tennessee
F	55	Anthony Douglas	6 ft 7 in (2.01 m)	255 lb (116 kg)	Sr	East	Memphis, Tennessee

Head coach

- Larry Finch (Memphis)

Assistant coach(es)

Legend

- (C) Team captain
- (S) Suspended
- (I) Ineligible
- (W) Walk-on
- Injured
- Current redshirt

Roster

== Schedule and results ==
Date time, TV	Rank^{#}	Opponent^{#}	Result	Record	Site city, state
Regular season
Dec 2, 1992*	No. 8	at Arkansas	L 76–81	0–1	Barnhill Arena; Fayetteville, Arkansas
Dec 6, 1992*	No. 8	at Tennessee	L 59–70	0–2	Thompson-Boling Arena; Knoxville, Tennessee
Dec 9, 1992*	No. 21	No. 20 Tulane	L 85–86	0–3	The Pyramid; Memphis, Tennessee
Dec 11, 1992*	No. 21	Southwestern Louisiana	W 91–85	1–3	The Pyramid; Memphis, Tennessee
Dec 18, 1992*		Jackson State	W 81–78	2–3	The Pyramid; Memphis, Tennessee
Dec 21, 1992*		at Chaminade; Maui Invitational Tournament	W 64–56	3–3	Lahaina Civic Center; Lahaina, Hawaii
Dec 22, 1992*		vs. BYU; Maui Invitational Tournament	L 67–73	3–4	Lahaina Civic Center; Lahaina, Hawaii
Dec 23, 1992*		vs. LSU; Maui Invitational Tournament	W 70–66	4–4	Lahaina Civic Center; Lahaina, Hawaii
Dec 28, 1992*		Robert Morris	W 78–63	5–4	The Pyramid; Memphis, Tennessee
Dec 31, 1992*		at Minnesota	L 55–70	5–5	Williams Arena; Minneapolis, Minnesota
Jan 4, 1993*		Georgia State	W 97–76	6–5	The Pyramid; Memphis, Tennessee
Jan 6, 1993*		No. 18 Vanderbilt	W 84–78	7–5	The Pyramid; Memphis, Tennessee
Feb 21, 1993*		vs. Arizona State	L 76–89	16–8	
Feb 24, 1993*		at Temple	L 58–65	16–9	McGonigle Hall; Philadelphia, Pennsylvania
Mar 6, 1993		at No. 12 Cincinnati	L 55–78	18–10 (7–3)	Fifth Third Arena; Cincinnati, Ohio
Great Midwest Conference Tournament
Mar 12, 1993*		Saint Louis; Quarterfinals	W 73–65	19–10	The Pyramid; Memphis, Tennessee
Mar 13, 1993*		No. 11 Cincinnati; Semifinals	L 72–77	20–11	The Pyramid; Memphis, Tennessee
NCAA Tournament
Mar 18, 1993*	(10 SE)	vs. (7 SE) No. 20 Western Kentucky; First Round	L 52–55	20–12	Orlando Arena; Orlando, Florida
*Non-conference game. ^{#}Rankings from AP Poll. (#) Tournament seedings in parentheses. W=West. All times are in Eastern Time.

== Awards and honors ==
- Penny Hardaway – GMC Player of the Year (2x)

== Team players in the 1993 NBA draft ==
Round	Pick	Player	NBA club
1	3	Penny Hardaway	Golden State Warriors
