= 1992–93 Houston Cougars men's basketball team =

American college basketball season

1992–93 Houston Cougars men's basketball
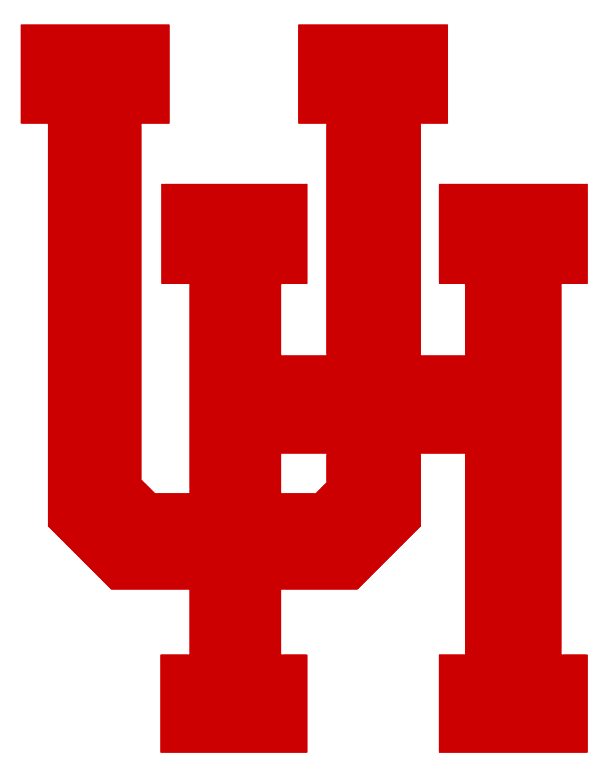

NIT, First Round
- Conference: Southwest Conference
- Record: 21–9 (9–5 SWC)
- Head coach: Pat Foster (7th season)
- Assistant coaches: Alvin Brooks; Tommy Jones
- Home arena: Hofheinz Pavilion

1992–93 Southwest Conference men's basketball standings
	Conf.				Overall
Team	W		L	PCT	W		L	PCT
SMU	12	–	2	.857	20	–	8	.714
Rice	11	–	3	.786	18	–	10	.643
Houston	9	–	5	.643	21	–	9	.700
Baylor	7	–	7	.500	16	–	11	.593
Texas Tech †	6	–	8	.429	18	–	12	.600
Texas A&M	5	–	9	.357	10	–	17	.370
Texas	4	–	10	.286	11	–	17	.393
TCU	2	–	12	.143	6	–	22	.214
† 1993 SWC tournament winner Rankings from AP Poll

The 1992–93 Houston Cougars men's basketball team represented the University of Houston as a member of the Southwest Conference during the 1992–93 NCAA men's basketball season. The head coach was Pat Foster, and the team played its home games at the Hofheinz Pavilion in Houston, Texas.

After the season, Foster left to take the head coaching position at Nevada, and assistant Alvin Brooks was elevated to take his place.

== Roster ==
1992–93 Houston Cougars men's basketball team
Players
Coaches

Pos.	#	Name	Height	Weight	Year	Previous school	Hometown
G	4	Anthony Goldwire	6 ft 1 in (1.85 m)	182 lb (83 kg)	Jr	Pensacola JC	West Palm Beach, Florida
G	34	David Díaz	6 ft 6 in (1.98 m)	—	Sr
F/C	45	Bo Outlaw	6 ft 8 in (2.03 m)	210 lb (95 kg)	Sr	South Plains CC	San Antonio, Texas

Head coach

- Pat Foster

Assistant coach(es)

- Alvin Brooks
- Tommy Jones

Legend

- (C) Team captain
- (S) Suspended
- (I) Ineligible
- (W) Walk-on
- Injured
- Current redshirt

== Schedule and results ==
Date time, TV	Rank^{#}	Opponent^{#}	Result	Record	Site (attendance) city, state
Regular season
Dec 5, 1992*		at DePaul	W 82–65	1–0	Rosemont Horizon; Chicago, Illinois
Dec 12, 1992*		UIC	W 92–66	2–0	Hofheinz Pavilion; Houston, Texas
Dec 13, 1992*		at No. 5 North Carolina	L 76–84	2–1	Dean Smith Center; Chapel Hill, North Carolina
Dec 17, 1992*		UTSA	W 94–67	3–1	Hofheinz Pavilion; Houston, Texas
Dec 22, 1992*		at Arkansas State	W 84–82	4–1	Convocation Center; Jonesboro, Arkansas
Dec 28, 1992*		Stephen F. Austin	W 76–75	5–1	Hofheinz Pavilion; Houston, Texas
Jan 2, 1993*		at No. 11 UCLA	L 78–87	5–2	Pauley Pavilion; Los Angeles, California
Jan 4, 1993*		UC Irvine	W 86–78	6–2	Hofheinz Pavilion; Houston, Texas
Jan 11, 1993*		Wyoming	W 83–56	7–2	Hofheinz Pavilion; Houston, Texas
Jan 14, 1993		Texas	W 81–67	8–2 (1–0)	Hofheinz Pavilion; Houston, Texas
Jan 16, 1993		at Texas A&M	W 81–69	9–2 (2–0)	G. Rollie White Coliseum; College Station, Texas
Jan 19, 1993		Baylor	W 83–77	10–2 (3–0)	Hofheinz Pavilion; Houston, Texas
Jan 23, 1993		SMU	W 85–75	11–2 (4–0)	Hofheinz Pavilion; Houston, Texas
Jan 26, 1993	No. 25	at Texas Tech	L 74–78	11–3 (4–1)	Lubbock Municipal Coliseum; Lubbock, Texas
Jan 30, 1993	No. 25	at SMU	L 60–70	11–4 (4–2)	Moody Coliseum; University Park, Texas
Feb 2, 1993		Rice	L 61–65	11–5 (4–3)	Hofheinz Pavilion; Houston, Texas
Feb 6, 1993		at TCU	L 66–68	11–6 (4–4)	Daniel-Meyer Coliseum; Fort Worth, Texas
Feb 8, 1993*		at Nevada	W 92–80	12–6	Lawlor Events Center; Reno, Nevada
Feb 10, 1993*		at Cal State Fullerton	W 77–63	13–6	Titan Gym; Fullerton, California
Feb 13, 1993		Texas Tech	W 93–76	14–6 (5–4)	Hofheinz Pavilion; Houston, Texas
Feb 17, 1993		Texas A&M	W 78–51	15–6 (6–4)	Hofheinz Pavilion; Houston, Texas
Feb 21, 1993*		No. 22 Louisville	W 89–81	16–6	Hofheinz Pavilion; Houston, Texas
Feb 23, 1993		at Baylor	W 76–75	17–6 (7–4)	Ferrell Center; Waco, Texas
Feb 27, 1993		at Texas	W 86–79	18–6 (8–4)	Frank Erwin Center; Austin, Texas
Mar 3, 1993		at Rice	L 78–89 ^{OT}	18–7 (8–5)	Rice Gymnasium; Houston, Texas
Mar 6, 1993		TCU	W 86–66	19–7 (9–5)	Hofheinz Pavilion; Houston, Texas
SWC tournament
Mar 12, 1993*	(3)	vs. (6) Texas A&M; Quarterfinals	W 84–68	20–7	Reunion Arena; Dallas, Texas
Mar 13, 1993*	(3)	vs. (7) Texas; Semifinals	W 58–50	21–7	Reunion Arena; Dallas, Texas
Mar 14, 1993*	(3)	vs. (5) Texas Tech; Championship	L 76–88	21–8	Reunion Arena; Dallas, Texas
NIT
Mar 19, 1993*		at UTEP; First round	L 61–67	21–9	Special Events Center; El Paso, Texas
*Non-conference game. ^{#}Rankings from AP poll. (#) Tournament seedings in parentheses.

== Rankings ==
Ranking movements Legend: ██ Increase in ranking ██ Decrease in ranking — = Not ranked
	Week																	
Poll	Pre	1	2	3	4	5	6	7	8	9	10	11	12	13	14	15	16	Final
AP	—	—	—	—	—	—	—	—	—	—	25	—	—	—	—	—	—	—
Coaches	—	—	—	—	—	—	—	—	—	—	—	—	—	—	—	—	—	—
