= 1992–93 BYU Cougars men's basketball team =

American college basketball season

1992–93 BYU Cougars men's basketball

WAC Regular Season co-champions

NCAA tournament, Second round
- Conference: Western Athletic Conference
- Record: 25–9 (15–3 WAC)
- Head coach: Roger Reid (4th season)
- Home arena: Marriott Center

1992–93 WAC men's basketball standings
	Conf.				Overall
Team	W		L	PCT	W		L	PCT
No. 19 Utah	15	–	3	.833	24	–	7	.774
BYU	15	–	3	.833	25	–	9	.735
No. 21 New Mexico †	13	–	5	.722	24	–	7	.774
UTEP	10	–	8	.556	21	–	13	.618
Colorado State	9	–	9	.500	17	–	12	.586
Fresno State	8	–	10	.444	13	–	15	.464
Hawaii	7	–	11	.389	12	–	16	.429
Wyoming	7	–	11	.389	13	–	15	.464
San Diego State	3	–	15	.167	8	–	21	.276
Air Force	3	–	15	.167	9	–	19	.321
† 1993 WAC tournament winner Rankings from AP Poll

The 1992–93 BYU Cougars men's basketball team represented Brigham Young University in the 1992–93 basketball season. Led by head coach Roger Reid, the Cougars won their second consecutive WAC title, and made their second tournament appearance under Reid. In the NCAA tournament, the Cougars defeated SMU in the first round, then were beaten by No. 2 seed Kansas to finish with an overall record of 25–9 (15–3 WAC).

== Roster ==
1992–93 BYU Cougars men's basketball team
Players	Coaches
Pos. / # / Name / Height / Weight / Year / Hometown; C / 34 / Gary Trost / 6 ft 10 in (2.08 m) / 235 lb (107 kg) / Sr	Head coach: Roger Reid; Assistant coach(es) Legend: (C) Team captain; (S) Suspended; (I) Ineligible; (W) Walk-on; Injured; Current redshirt

== Schedule and results ==
Date time, TV	Rank^{#}	Opponent^{#}	Result	Record	Site city, state
Regular season
Dec 1, 1992*		Arizona State	W 108–98	1–0	Marriott Center; Provo, Utah
Dec 4, 1992*		at Utah State	W 93–83	2–0	Dee Glen Smith Spectrum; Logan, Utah
Dec 8, 1992*		at Weber State	L 77–83	2–1	Dee Events Center; Ogden, Utah
Dec 11, 1992*		Southern Utah	W 108–62	3–1	Marriott Center; Provo, Utah
Dec 12, 1992*		Georgia	W 74–64	4–1	Marriott Center; Provo, Utah
Dec 18, 1992*		Utah State	W 89–65	5–1	Marriott Center; Provo, Utah
Dec 21, 1992*		vs. No. 9 Oklahoma; Maui Invitational	W 76–75	6–1	Lahaina Civic Center
Dec 22, 1992*		vs. Memphis State; Maui Invitational	W 73–67	7–1	Lahaina Civic Center
Dec 23, 1992*		vs. No. 1 Duke; Maui Invitational	L 66–89	7–2	Lahaina Civic Center
WAC Tournament
Mar 11, 1993*	(2) No. 25	vs. (7) Hawaii; Quarterfinals	W 85–71	24–7	Delta Center; Salt Lake City, Utah
Mar 12, 1993*	(2) No. 25	vs. (3) New Mexico; Semifinals	L 59–69	24–8	Delta Center; Salt Lake City, Utah
NCAA Tournament
Mar 18, 1993*	(7 MW)	vs. (10 MW) SMU; First round	W 80–71	25–8	Rosemont Horizon; Rosemont, Illinois
Mar 20, 1993*	(7 MW)	vs. (2 MW) No. 9 Kansas; Second round	L 76–90	25–9	Rosemont Horizon; Rosemont, Illinois
*Non-conference game. ^{#}Rankings from AP poll. (#) Tournament seedings in parentheses. MW=Midwest.

== Players in the 1993 NBA draft ==
Round	Pick	Player	NBA club
1	2	Shawn Bradley	Philadelphia 76ers
