= 1992–93 Austin Peay Governors basketball team =

American college basketball season

1992–93 Austin Peay Governors men's basketball
- Conference: Ohio Valley
- Record: 7–20 (4–12 OVC)
- Head coach: Dave Loos (3rd season)
- Home arena: Winfield Dunn Center

1992–93 Ohio Valley Conference men's basketball standings
	Conf.				Overall
Team	W		L	PCT	W		L	PCT
Tennessee State †	13	–	3	.813	19	–	10	.655
Eastern Kentucky	11	–	5	.688	15	–	12	.556
Murray State	11	–	5	.688	18	–	12	.600
Tennessee Tech	9	–	7	.563	15	–	13	.536
Southeast Missouri State	9	–	7	.563	16	–	11	.593
Morehead State	6	–	10	.375	6	–	21	.222
Middle Tennessee	5	–	11	.313	10	–	16	.385
Austin Peay	4	–	12	.250	7	–	20	.259
UT Martin	4	–	12	.250	7	–	19	.269
† 1993 OVC tournament winner Rankings from AP Poll

The 1992–93 Austin Peay Governors basketball team represented Austin Peay State University in the 1992–93 season. The Governors, led by 3rd-year head coach Dave Loos, played their home games at the Dunn Center in Clarksville, Tennessee as members of the Ohio Valley Conference.

== Roster ==
1992–93 Austin Peay Governors men's basketball team
Players
Coaches

Pos.	#	Name	Height	Weight	Year	Hometown
F		Rick Yudt	6 ft 7 in (2.01 m)	—	So
G		Greg Franklin	6 ft 3 in (1.91 m)	—	Sr
C		Reggie Dupree	6 ft 6 in (1.98 m)	—	Sr
F		John Jenkins	6 ft 4 in (1.93 m)	—	So
F		Tyrone Beck	6 ft 8 in (2.03 m)	—	Jr
G		Carlos Meriwether	6 ft 4 in (1.93 m)	—	Jr
F		Jermaine Savage	6 ft 4 in (1.93 m)	—	Fr
G		Cole Cabson	6 ft 2 in (1.88 m)	—	Fr
C		Otis Key	6 ft 8 in (2.03 m)	—	Fr
C		Devlin Bell	6 ft 6 in (1.98 m)	—	Sr
G		Jasen Heien	6 ft 1 in (1.85 m)	—	So
F		Malcolm McCormick	6 ft 4 in (1.93 m)	—	Sr

Head coach

- Dave Loos (Memphis)

Assistant coach(es)

Legend

- (C) Team captain
- (S) Suspended
- (I) Ineligible
- (W) Walk-on
- Injured
- Current redshirt

== Schedule ==
Date time, TV	Rank^{#}	Opponent^{#}	Result	Record	Site city, state
Non-conference regular season
Dec 1, 1992*		at Mississippi State	L 73–80	0–1	Humphrey Coliseum; Mississippi State, Mississippi
Dec 5, 1992*		Christian Brothers	W 96–82	1–1	Winfield Dunn Center; Clarksville, Tennessee
Dec 11, 1992*		at No. 4 Indiana; Indiana Classic	L 61–107	1–2	Assembly Hall; Bloomington, Indiana
Dec 12, 1992*		vs. Pacific; Indiana Classic	W 72–69	2–2	Assembly Hall; Bloomington, Indiana
Dec 18, 1992*		Arkansas State	W 64–58	3–2	Winfield Dunn Center; Clarksville, Tennessee
Dec 19, 1992*		Vanderbilt	L 71–116	3–3	Winfield Dunn Center; Clarksville, Tennessee
Dec 28, 1992*		at UTEP	L 56–77	3–4	Don Haskins Center; El Paso, Texas
Dec 29, 1992*		vs. Florida	L 62–86	3–5	Don Haskins Center; El Paso, Texas
Jan 2, 1993*		Evansville	L 73–75	3–6	Winfield Dunn Center; Clarksville, Tennessee
OVC regular season
Jan 9, 1993		Murray State	L 76–82	3–7 (0–1)	Winfield Dunn Center; Clarksville, Tennessee
Jan 11, 1993		Southeast Missouri State	L 68–90	3–6 (0–2)	Winfield Dunn Center; Clarksville, Tennessee
Jan 14, 1993		Tennessee Tech	L 72–90	3–7 (0–3)	Winfield Dunn Center; Clarksville, Tennessee
Jan 16, 1993		at Eastern Kentucky	L 73–78	3–8 (0–4)	McBrayer Arena; Richmond, Kentucky
Jan 18, 1993		at Morehead State	L 58–79	3–9 (0–5)	Ellis T. Johnson Arena; Morehead, Kentucky
Jan 23, 1993		Tennessee-Martin	L 71–74	3–10 (0–6)	Winfield Dunn Center; Clarksville, Tennessee
Jan 27, 1993		at Middle Tennessee State	L 55–73	3–11 (0–7)	Murphy Center; Murfreesboro, Tennessee
Jan 30, 1993		at Tennessee State	L 68–93	3–12 (0–8)	Gentry Complex; Nashville, Tennessee
Feb 3, 1993*		at No. 4 Cincinnati	L 61–98	3–13 (0–8)	Fifth Third Arena; Cincinnati, Ohio
Feb 6, 1993		Eastern Kentucky	L 64–65	3–14 (0–9)	Winfield Dunn Center; Clarksville, Tennessee
Feb 8, 1993		Morehead State	W 90–75	4–14 (1–9)	Winfield Dunn Center; Clarksville, Tennessee
Feb 11, 1993		at Tennessee Tech	L 83–92	4–15 (1–10)	Eblen Center; Cookeville, Tennessee
Feb 13, 1993		at Tennessee-Martin	W 61–59	5–15 (2–10)	Eblen Center; Union City, Tennessee
Feb 20, 1993		at Murray State	L 69–88	5–16 (2–11)	Racer Arena; Murray, Kentucky
Feb 22, 1993		at Southeast Missouri State	L 64–77	5–17 (2–12)	Show Me Center; Cape Girardeau, Missouri
Feb 25, 1993		Middle Tennessee State	W 57–51	6–18 (3–12)	Winfield Dunn Center; Clarksville, Tennessee
Feb 27, 1993		Tennessee State	W 80–77	7–19 (4–12)	Winfield Dunn Center; Clarksville, Tennessee
Ohio Valley tournament
Mar 4, 1993	(6)	vs. (3) Murray State; Quarterfinals	L 66–82	7–20 (4–12)	Rupp Arena; Lexington, Kentucky
*Non-conference game. ^{#}Rankings from AP Poll. (#) Tournament seedings in parentheses.
