= 1992–93 LSU Tigers basketball team =

American college basketball season

1992–93 LSU Tigers basketball

NCAA tournament
- Conference: Southeastern Conference
- West Division
- Record: 22–11 (9–7 SEC)
- Head coach: Dale Brown (21st season)
- Assistant coaches: Johnny Jones (9th season); Bob Starkey (3rd season)
- Home arena: Pete Maravich Assembly Center

1992–93 Southeastern Conference men's basketball standings
	Conf.				Overall
Team	W		L	PCT	W		L	PCT
East
No. 8 Vanderbilt	14	–	2	.875	28	–	6	.824
No. 2 Kentucky †	13	–	3	.813	30	–	4	.882
Florida	9	–	7	.563	16	–	12	.571
Georgia	8	–	8	.500	15	–	14	.517
South Carolina	5	–	11	.313	9	–	18	.333
Tennessee	4	–	12	.250	13	–	17	.433
West
No. 12 Arkansas	10	–	6	.625	22	–	9	.710
LSU	9	–	7	.563	22	–	11	.667
Auburn	8	–	8	.500	15	–	12	.556
Alabama	7	–	9	.438	16	–	13	.552
Mississippi State	5	–	11	.313	13	–	16	.448
Ole Miss	4	–	12	.250	10	–	18	.357
† 1993 SEC tournament winner Rankings from AP poll

The 1992-93 LSU Tigers men's basketball team represented Louisiana State University during the 1992–93 NCAA men's college basketball season. The head coach was Dale Brown. The team was a member of the Southeastern Conference and played their home games at Pete Maravich Assembly Center.

The Tigers finished second in the SEC West standings, and made a strong run to the championship game of the SEC Tournament. LSU received an at-large bid to the NCAA tournament as No. 11 seed in the Midwest region where they lost in the opening round to California. After ten straight tournament appearances (and 13 overall), this would be the last season Coach Brown would take a team to the NCAA Tournament. The team finished with a 22–11 record (9–7 SEC).

== Roster ==
1992–93 LSU Tigers men's basketball team
Players
Coaches

Pos.	#	Name	Height	Weight	Year	Previous school	Hometown
F	4	Jamie Brandon	6 ft 4 in (1.93 m)	220 lb (100 kg)	Jr		Chicago, IL
F	12	Sean Gipson	6 ft 6 in (1.98 m)	195 lb (88 kg)	Sr		Winston-Salem, NC
F	22	Clarence Ceasar	6 ft 8 in (2.03 m)	213 lb (97 kg)	So		Iowa, LA
C	43	Geert Hammink	7 ft 0 in (2.13 m)	260 lb (118 kg)	Sr		Didam, Netherlands

Head coach

- Dale Brown (Minot State)

Assistant coach(es)

Legend

- (C) Team captain
- (S) Suspended
- (I) Ineligible
- (W) Walk-on
- Injured
- Current redshirt

Roster

== Schedule and results ==
Date time, TV	Rank^{#}	Opponent^{#}	Result	Record	Site city, state
Non-conference regular season
Dec 1, 1992*		McNeese State	W 83–72	1–0	Maravich Assembly Center; Baton Rouge, Louisiana
Dec 3, 1992*		Southeastern Louisiana	W 92–65	2–0	Maravich Assembly Center; Baton Rouge, Louisiana
Dec 5, 1992*		Mercer	W 82–48	3–0	Maravich Assembly Center; Baton Rouge, Louisiana
Dec 15, 1992*		Nicholls State	W 75–64	4–0	Maravich Assembly Center; Baton Rouge, Louisiana
Dec 16, 1992*		Campbell	W 93–71	5–0	Maravich Assembly Center; Baton Rouge, Louisiana
Dec 21, 1992*		vs. Stanford; Maui Invitational	W 72–63	6–0	Lahaina Civic Center; Lahaina, Hawaii
Dec 22, 1992*		vs. No. 1 Duke; Maui Invitational	L 67–96	6–1	Lahaina Civic Center; Lahaina, Hawaii
Dec 23, 1992*		vs. Memphis State; Maui Invitational	L 66–70	6–2	Lahaina Civic Center; Lahaina, Hawaii
Dec 29, 1992*		Northwestern State	W 93–79	7–2	Maravich Assembly Center; Baton Rouge, Louisiana
Dec 30, 1992*		Tennessee State	W 90–68	8–2	Maravich Assembly Center; Baton Rouge, Louisiana
Jan 2, 1993*		Drake	W 94–86	9–2	Maravich Assembly Center; Baton Rouge, Louisiana
SEC regular season
Jan 6, 1993		at Alabama	L 67–77	9–3 (0–1)	Coleman Coliseum; Tuscaloosa, Alabama
Jan 9, 1993		Auburn	W 87–81	10–3 (1–1)	Maravich Assembly Center; Baton Rouge, Louisiana
Jan 13, 1993		at Mississippi State	W 84–76	11–3 (2–1)	Humphrey Coliseum; Starkville, Mississippi
Jan 16, 1993		Florida	W 85–81	12–3 (3–1)	Maravich Assembly Center; Baton Rouge, Louisiana
Jan 20, 1993*		Central Connecticut State	W 86–53	13–3	Maravich Assembly Center; Baton Rouge, Louisiana
Jan 23, 1993		at Ole Miss	L 62–71	13–4 (3–2)	Tad Smith Coliseum; Oxford, Mississippi
Jan 26, 1993		at No. 4 Kentucky	L 67–105	13–5 (3–3)	Rupp Arena; Lexington, Kentucky
Jan 30, 1993		South Carolina	W 85–62	14–5 (4–3)	Maravich Assembly Center; Baton Rouge, Louisiana
Feb 2, 1993		No. 17 Arkansas	L 79–91	14–6 (4–4)	Maravich Assembly Center; Baton Rouge, Louisiana
Feb 7, 1993*		vs. Texas	W 84–81	15–6	Frank Erwin Center; Austin, Texas
Feb 10, 1993		Mississippi State	W 92–66	16–6 (5–4)	Maravich Assembly Center; Baton Rouge, Louisiana
Feb 13, 1993		at Auburn	W 75–73	17–6 (6–4)	Beard-Eaves-Memorial Coliseum; Auburn, Alabama
Feb 17, 1993		No. 11 Vanderbilt	L 66–87	17–7 (6–5)	Maravich Assembly Center; Baton Rouge, Louisiana
Feb 20, 1993		at Tennessee	W 81–74	18–7 (7–5)	Thompson-Boling Arena; Knoxville, Tennessee
Feb 23, 1993		Alabama	W 76–68	19–7 (8–5)	Maravich Assembly Center; Baton Rouge, Louisiana
Feb 27, 1993; 1:00 p.m., JPS		at Georgia	L 78–81	19–8 (8–6)	Stegeman Coliseum; Athens, Georgia
Mar 3, 1993; 7:00 p.m., JPS		at No. 13 Arkansas	L 75–88	19–9 (8–7)	Barnhill Arena; Fayetteville, Arkansas
Mar 6, 1993		Ole Miss	W 71–56	20–9 (9–7)	Maravich Assembly Center; Baton Rouge, Louisiana
SEC Tournament
Mar 12, 1993*; JPS		vs. Ole Miss; Quarterfinals	W 89–70	21–9	Rupp Arena; Lexington, Kentucky
Mar 13, 1993*; JPS		vs. No. 5 Vanderbilt; Semifinals	W 72–62	22–9	Rupp Arena; Lexington, Kentucky
Mar 14, 1993*; JPS		at No. 4 Kentucky; Championship game	L 65–82	22–10	Rupp Arena; Lexington, Kentucky
NCAA Tournament
Mar 18, 1993*	(11 MW)	vs. (6 MW) California; First round	L 64–66	22–11	Rosemont Horizon; Rosemont, Illinois
*Non-conference game. ^{#}Rankings from AP Poll. (#) Tournament seedings in parentheses. MW=Midwest.

== Team players drafted into the NBA ==
Round	Pick	Player	NBA club
1	26	Geert Hammink	Orlando Magic
