= 1993 Great Midwest Conference men's basketball tournament =

- Classification: Division I
- Season: 1992–93
- Teams: 6
- Site: The Pyramid; Memphis, Tennessee
- Champions: Cincinnati (2nd title)
- Winning coach: Bob Huggins (2nd title)

1992–93 Great Midwest Conference men's basketball standings
	Conf.				Overall
Team	W		L	PCT	W		L	PCT
No. 7 Cincinnati †	8	–	2	.800	27	–	5	.844
Memphis State	7	–	3	.700	20	–	12	.625
Marquette	6	–	4	.600	20	–	8	.714
UAB	5	–	5	.500	21	–	14	.600
DePaul	3	–	7	.300	16	–	15	.516
Saint Louis	1	–	9	.100	12	–	17	.414
† 1993 GMC tournament winner Rankings from AP Poll

The 1993 Great Midwest Conference men's basketball tournament was held March 11–13, 1993. Although its winner did not receive an automatic bid to the 1993 NCAA tournament, the tournament champion, Cincinnati, received an at-large bid and advanced to the Elite Eight.

== Bracket and results ==
Quarterfinals; Thursday, March 11
4	UAB	64
5	DePaul	66
3	Marquette	57
6	Saint Louis	63

Semifinals; Friday, March 12
1	#11 Cincinnati	78
5	DePaul	69
2	Memphis State	73
6	Saint Louis	65

Final; Saturday, March 13
1	#11 Cincinnati	77
2	Memphis State	72
