= 1993 WAC men's basketball tournament =

- Classification: Division I
- Season: 1992–93
- Teams: 10
- Site: Delta Center; Salt Lake City, UT
- Champions: New Mexico (1st title)
- Winning coach: Dave Bliss (1st title)
- MVP: Ike Williams (New Mexico)

1992–93 WAC men's basketball standings
	Conf.				Overall
Team	W		L	PCT	W		L	PCT
No. 19 Utah	15	–	3	.833	24	–	7	.774
BYU	15	–	3	.833	25	–	9	.735
No. 21 New Mexico †	13	–	5	.722	24	–	7	.774
UTEP	10	–	8	.556	21	–	13	.618
Colorado State	9	–	9	.500	17	–	12	.586
Fresno State	8	–	10	.444	13	–	15	.464
Hawaii	7	–	11	.389	12	–	16	.429
Wyoming	7	–	11	.389	13	–	15	.464
San Diego State	3	–	15	.167	8	–	21	.276
Air Force	3	–	15	.167	9	–	19	.321
† 1993 WAC tournament winner Rankings from AP Poll

The 1993 Western Athletic Conference men's basketball tournament was held March 10–13 at the Delta Center in Salt Lake City, Utah. This was the first WAC tournament not held on a campus arena.

New Mexico defeated UTEP in the championship game, 76–65, to clinch their first WAC men's tournament championship.

The Lobos, in turn, received an automatic bid to the 1993 NCAA tournament. They were joined in the tournament by the conference's regular season co-champions, Utah and BYU, who received at-large bids to the tournament.

== Format ==
With the addition of Fresno State to the WAC in 1993, the conference's total membership expanded to ten teams. In turn, the tournament field expanded to once again feature all WAC members. The top six teams received byes into the quarterfinal round, leaving the lowest four-seeded teams to play in the first round. Like before, teams were seeded based on regular season conference records.

== Bracket ==
First round Wednesday, March 10
9	San Diego State	59
8	Wyoming	57
7	Hawaii	62
10	Air Force	54

Quarterfinals; Thursday, March 11
1	#15 Utah	85
9	San Diego State	64
5	Colorado State	65
4	UTEP	70
3	New Mexico	72
6	Fresno State	48
7	Hawaii	71
2	#25 BYU	85

Semifinals; Friday, March 12
1	#15 Utah	85
4	UTEP	90
3	New Mexico	69
2	#25 BYU	59

Championship; Saturday, March 13
4	UTEP	65
3	New Mexico	76
