= 1992–93 Marquette Warriors men's basketball team =

American college basketball season

1992–93 Marquette Warriors men's basketball

NCAA tournament, second round, L 62–74 vs. Oklahoma State
- Conference: Great Midwest Conference
- Record: 20–8 (6-5 GMWC)
- Head coach: Kevin O'Neill (4th season)
- Home arena: Bradley Center

1992–93 Great Midwest Conference men's basketball standings
	Conf.				Overall
Team	W		L	PCT	W		L	PCT
No. 7 Cincinnati †	8	–	2	.800	27	–	5	.844
Memphis State	7	–	3	.700	20	–	12	.625
Marquette	6	–	4	.600	20	–	8	.714
UAB	5	–	5	.500	21	–	14	.600
DePaul	3	–	7	.300	16	–	15	.516
Saint Louis	1	–	9	.100	12	–	17	.414
† 1993 GMC tournament winner Rankings from AP Poll

The 1992–93 Marquette Warriors men's basketball team represented the Marquette University in the 1992–93 season. The Warriors finished the regular season with a record of 20–8, 6–5. They received the conference's automatic bid to the NCAA Tournament where they lost in the first round to Oklahoma State.

== Roster ==
1992–93 Marquette Warriors men's basketball team
Players
Coaches

Pos.	#	Name	Height	Weight	Year	Hometown
G	20	Craig Aamot	6 ft 2 in (1.88 m)	190 lb (86 kg)	So	Waukesha, Wisconsin
F	33	Ron Curry	6 ft 8 in (2.03 m)	190 lb (86 kg)	Sr	Bloomington, Illinois
G	13	Roney Eford	6 ft 6 in (1.98 m)	205 lb (93 kg)	Fr	Queens, New York
G	22	William Gates	6 ft 0 in (1.83 m)	175 lb (79 kg)	So	Chicago, Illinois
F	35	Damon Key	6 ft 8 in (2.03 m)	245 lb (111 kg)	Jr	Milwaukee, Wisconsin
G	12	Robb Logterman	6 ft 3 in (1.91 m)	170 lb (77 kg)	Jr	Janesville, Wisconsin
C	00	Amal McCaskill	6 ft 11 in (2.11 m)	220 lb (100 kg)	RS Fr	Maywood, Illinois
C	34	Jim McIlvaine	7 ft 1 in (2.16 m)	240 lb (109 kg)	Jr	Racine, Wisconsin
G	10	Tony Miller	6 ft 0 in (1.83 m)	189 lb (86 kg)	So	Cleveland, Ohio
G	21	Ben Peavy	6 ft 4 in (1.93 m)	170 lb (77 kg)	Sr	San Antonio, Texas
G	54	Adam Schabes	6 ft 3 in (1.91 m)	185 lb (84 kg)	Sr	Chicago, Illinois
F	42	Shannon Smith	6 ft 6 in (1.98 m)	195 lb (88 kg)	So	Milwaukee, Wisconsin
F	4	Dwaine Streater	6 ft 8 in (2.03 m)	230 lb (104 kg)	Fr	East Saint Louis, Illinois
F	32	Jay Zulauf	6 ft 6 in (1.98 m)	205 lb (93 kg)	Sr	Port Huron, Michigan

Head coach

- Kevin O'Neill

Assistant coach(es)

- Bo Ellis
- Dan Theiss
- Craig McMillan

Legend

- (C) Team captain
- (S) Suspended
- (I) Ineligible
- (W) Walk-on
- Injured
- Current redshirt

== Schedule ==
Date time, TV	Rank^{#}	Opponent^{#}	Result	Record	Site city, state
December 4*		North Carolina A&T	W 84–43	1–0	Bradley Center; Milwaukee, WI
December 5*		Manhattan	W 85–62	2–0	Bradley Center (10,447); Milwaukee, WI
December 7*		Charleston Southern	W 73–35	3–0	Bradley Center; Milwaukee, WI
December 9*		Northeastern Illinois	W 95–65	4–0	Bradley Center; Milwaukee, WI
December 19*		American	W 90–74	5–0	Bradley Center; Milwaukee, WI
December 21*		Western Illinois	W 83–59	6–0	Bradley Center; Milwaukee, WI
December 26*		at Nevada-Las Vegas	L 88–94	6–1	Thomas & Mack Center; Paradise, Nevada
December 29*		at Illinois	W 61–58	7–1	Assembly Hall; Champaign, Illinois
January 2*		Wisconsin	L 67–77	7–2	Bradley Center; Milwaukee, WI
January 6*		Dayton	W 82–44	8–2	Bradley Center; Milwaukee, WI
January 9		at Alabama-Birmingham	W 80–66	9–2 (1–0)	Bartow Arena; Birmingham, Alabama
January 13*		Chicago State	W 96–47	10–2 (1–0)	Bradley Center; Milwaukee, WI
January 16		Saint Louis	W 65–53	11–2 (2–0)	Bradley Center; Milwaukee, WI
January 18		at Fordham	W 66–40	12–2 (2–0)	Rose Hill Gym; Bronx, NY
January 20*		Delaware State	W 105–65	13–2 (2–0)	Braldey Center; Milwaukee, WI
January 23		Memphis	W 78–66	14–2 (3–0)	Braldey Center; Milwaukee, WI
January 30		at Saint Louis	W 65–53	15–2 (4–0)	St. Louis Arena; St. Louis, Missouri
February 2*		at South Florida	W 69–54	16–2 (4–0)	Sun Dome; Tampa, Florida
February 6		at DePaul	W 87–76	17–2 (5–0)	Allstate Arena
February 10		at Cincinnati	L 53–55	17–3 (5–1)	Fifth Third Arena; Cincinnati, Ohio
February 13		Alabama-Birmingham	L 38–44	17–4 (5–2)	Bradley Center; Milwaukee, WI
February 17*		at Notre Dame	W 69–61	18–4 (5–2)	Joyce Center; South Bend, Indiana
February 20*		UW-Green Bay	W 63–46	19–4 (5–2)	Bradley Center; Milwaukee, WI
February 25		Cincinnati	L 57–66	19–5 (5–3)	Bradley Center; Milwaukee, WI
February 27		at Memphis	L 63–68	19–6 (5–4)	The Pyramid; Memphis, Tennessee
March 6		DePaul	W 86–75	20–6 (6–4)	Bradley Center; Milwaukee, WI
March 11		vs. Saint Louis; Great Midwest Conference tournament	L 57–63	20–7 (6–5)	The Pyramid
March 19*		vs. Oklahoma State; NCAA tournament • First Round	L 62–74	20–8 (6–5)	Hoosier Dome; Indianapolis, Indiana
*Non-conference game. ^{#}Rankings from AP Poll. (#) Tournament seedings in parentheses.
