= 1993 SEC men's basketball tournament =

- Classification: Division I
- Season: 1992–93
- Teams: 12
- Site: Rupp Arena; Lexington, Kentucky
- Champions: Kentucky (18th title)
- Winning coach: Rick Pitino (2nd title)
- MVP: Travis Ford (Kentucky)
- Attendance: 240,373 (sellout)
- Television: Jefferson Pilot Sports

1992–93 Southeastern Conference men's basketball standings
	Conf.				Overall
Team	W		L	PCT	W		L	PCT
East
No. 8 Vanderbilt	14	–	2	.875	28	–	6	.824
No. 2 Kentucky †	13	–	3	.813	30	–	4	.882
Florida	9	–	7	.563	16	–	12	.571
Georgia	8	–	8	.500	15	–	14	.517
South Carolina	5	–	11	.313	9	–	18	.333
Tennessee	4	–	12	.250	13	–	17	.433
West
No. 12 Arkansas	10	–	6	.625	22	–	9	.710
LSU	9	–	7	.563	22	–	11	.667
Auburn	8	–	8	.500	15	–	12	.556
Alabama	7	–	9	.438	16	–	13	.552
Mississippi State	5	–	11	.313	13	–	16	.448
Ole Miss	4	–	12	.250	10	–	18	.357
† 1993 SEC tournament winner Rankings from AP poll

The 1993 SEC men's basketball tournament took place from March 11–14, 1993 in downtown Lexington, Kentucky at Rupp Arena, the home court of the University of Kentucky Wildcats.

The Kentucky Wildcats won the SEC Tournament championship, thus receiving the SEC's automatic bid to the 1993 NCAA Division I Men's Basketball Tournament by defeating the LSU Tigers by a score of 82–65.

== Television broadcasts ==
Tournament coverage was provided in its entirety by Jefferson Pilot Sports, which was in its sixth season with regional syndication rights to SEC basketball games. Tom Hammond and former Ole Miss Rebels basketball coach Ed Murphy provided play-by-play commentary.

== Bracket ==
First round
W4	Alabama	87
E5	South Carolina	79
E3	Florida	62
W6	Ole Miss	67
E4	Georgia	87
W5	Mississippi State	56
W3	Auburn	76
E6	Tennessee	78

Second Round
E1	#5 Vanderbilt	76
W4	Alabama	59
W2	LSU	89
W6	Ole Miss	70
W1	#14 Arkansas	65
E4	Georgia	60
E2	#4 Kentucky	101
E6	Tennessee	40

Semifinals
E1	#5 Vanderbilt	62
W2	LSU	72
W1	#14 Arkansas	81
E2	#4 Kentucky	92

Championship Game
W2	LSU	65
E2	#4 Kentucky	82
