= 1992–93 Cincinnati Bearcats men's basketball team =

American college basketball season

1992–93 Cincinnati Bearcats men's basketball

Great Midwest regular season champions

Great Midwest Tournament champions

NCAA tournament, Elite Eight
- Conference: Great Midwest Conference

Ranking
- Coaches: No. 6
- AP: No. 7
- Record: 27–5 (8–2 Great Midwest)
- Head coach: Bob Huggins (4th season)
- Assistant coaches: Larry Harrison; Steve Moeller; John Loyer
- Home arena: Myrl Shoemaker Center

1992–93 Great Midwest Conference men's basketball standings
	Conf.				Overall
Team	W		L	PCT	W		L	PCT
No. 7 Cincinnati †	8	–	2	.800	27	–	5	.844
Memphis State	7	–	3	.700	20	–	12	.625
Marquette	6	–	4	.600	20	–	8	.714
UAB	5	–	5	.500	21	–	14	.600
DePaul	3	–	7	.300	16	–	15	.516
Saint Louis	1	–	9	.100	12	–	17	.414
† 1993 GMC tournament winner Rankings from AP Poll

The 1992–93 Cincinnati Bearcats men's basketball team represented the University of Cincinnati in NCAA Division I competition in the 1992–93 season. The Bearcats, coached by Bob Huggins, won the Great Midwest Conference, and reached the Elite Eight of the 1993 NCAA tournament. The team finished with an overall record of 27–5 (8–2 GMWC).

== Roster ==
1992–93 Cincinnati Bearcats men's basketball team
Players
Coaches

Pos.	#	Name	Height	Weight	Year	Hometown
F	3	Erik Martin	6 ft 5 in (1.96 m)	220 lb (100 kg)	Sr	Covina, California
G	10	Tarrance Gibson	6 ft 2 in (1.88 m)	166 lb (75 kg)	Sr	Dothan, Alabama
G	20	David Evans	6 ft 2 in (1.88 m)	170 lb (77 kg)	Fr	Joliet, Illinois
G	23	LaZelle Durden	6 ft 2 in (1.88 m)	175 lb (79 kg)	So	Rossford, Ohio
F	21	Keith Gregor	6 ft 5 in (1.96 m)	205 lb (93 kg)	Fr	Cincinnati, Ohio
G	31	Nick Van Exel	6 ft 1 in (1.85 m)	171 lb (78 kg)	Sr	Kenosha, Wisconsin
F	32	Mike Harris	6 ft 6 in (1.98 m)	218 lb (99 kg)	Jr	Brooklyn, New York
F	33	Terry Nelson	6 ft 5 in (1.96 m)	213 lb (97 kg)	Sr	Long Beach, California
C	44	Corie Blount	6 ft 10 in (2.08 m)	220 lb (100 kg)	Sr	Monrovia, California
F	43	Curtis Bostic	6 ft 5 in (1.96 m)	215 lb (98 kg)	Jr	Brockton, Massachusetts
G	52	Allen Jackson	6 ft 1 in (1.85 m)	171 lb (78 kg)	Sr	South Bend, Indiana
F	54	Darrick Ford	6 ft 7 in (2.01 m)	235 lb (107 kg)	Fr	Lanham, Maryland
F	55	John Jacobs	6 ft 7 in (2.01 m)	255 lb (116 kg)	So	Cincinnati, Ohio

Head coach

- Bob Huggins (West Virginia)

Assistant coach(es)

- Larry Harrison (Pittsburgh)
- Steve Moeller (Otterbein)
- John Loyer (Akron)
- Chuck Machock (Cincinnati)

Legend

- (C) Team captain
- (S) Suspended
- (I) Ineligible
- (W) Walk-on
- Injured
- Current redshirt

== Schedule ==
Date time, TV	Rank^{#}	Opponent^{#}	Result	Record	Site city, state
Non-conference regular season
Dec 1, 1992*	No. 22	Texas Southern	W 87–44	1–0	Myrl Shoemaker Center; Cincinnati, Ohio
Dec 11, 1992*	No. 19	Southeast Missouri State	W 83–58	2–0	Myrl Shoemaker Center; Cincinnati, Ohio
Dec 12, 1992*	No. 19	Georgia Southern	W 91–57	3–0	Myrl Shoemaker Center; Cincinnati, Ohio
Dec 19, 1992*	No. 19	at No. 4 Indiana	L 64–79	3–1	Assembly Hall; Bloomington, Indiana
Dec 26, 1992*	No. 23	Temple	W 68–45	4–1	Myrl Shoemaker Center; Cincinnati, Ohio
Dec 29, 1992*	No. 21	at Dayton	W 65–55	5–1	University of Dayton Arena; Dayton, Ohio
Jan 2, 1993*	No. 21	South Alabama	W 87–49	6–1	Myrl Shoemaker Center; Cincinnati, Ohio
Jan 4, 1993*	No. 16	Tennessee	W 79–58	7–1	Myrl Shoemaker Center; Cincinnati, Ohio
Jan 7, 1993*	No. 16	vs. No. 22 UMass	W 64–53	8–1	Springfield Civic Center; Springfield, Massachusetts
Jan 9, 1993	No. 16	at Saint Louis	W 80–65	9–1 (1–0)	St. Louis Arena; St. Louis, Missouri
Jan 13, 1993*	No. 11	at Cleveland State	W 72–63	10–1	CSU Convocation Center; Cleveland, Ohio
Jan 16, 1993	No. 11	at DePaul	W 70–64	11–1 (2–0)	Rosemont Horizon; Rosemont, Illinois
Jan 19, 1993*	No. 9	Chicago State	W 103–43	12–1	Myrl Shoemaker Center; Cincinnati, Ohio
Jan 23, 1993	No. 9	UAB	W 40–38	13–1 (3–0)	Myrl Shoemaker Center; Cincinnati, Ohio
Jan 27, 1993*	No. 6	Xavier	W 78–67	14–1	Myrl Shoemaker Center; Cincinnati, Ohio
Jan 30, 1993	No. 6	DePaul	W 80–54	15–1 (4–0)	Myrl Shoemaker Center; Cincinnati, Ohio
Feb 1, 1993*	No. 4	at Miami (OH)	W 74–68	16–1	Millett Hall; Oxford, Ohio
Feb 3, 1993*	No. 4	Austin Peay	W 98–61	17–1	Myrl Shoemaker Center; Cincinnati, Ohio
Feb 6, 1993	No. 4	at Memphis State	L 66–68	17–2 (4–1)	Pyramid Arena; Memphis, Tennessee
Feb 10, 1993	No. 8	No. 15 Marquette	W 55–53	18–2 (5–1)	Myrl Shoemaker Center; Cincinnati, Ohio
Feb 13, 1993	No. 8	Saint Louis	W 64–39	19–2 (6–1)	Myrl Shoemaker Center; Cincinnati, Ohio
Feb 17, 1993*	No. 8	at South Florida	W 72–50	20–2	Sun Dome; Tampa, Florida
Feb 21, 1993*	No. 8	vs. No. 4 Arizona; 7-Up Shootout	L 60–70	20–3	America West Arena; Phoenix, Arizona
Feb 25, 1993	No. 10	at No. 20 Marquette	W 66–57	21–3 (7–1)	Bradley Center; Milwaukee, Wisconsin
Feb 27, 1993	No. 10	at UAB	L 60–67	21–4 (7–2)	Bartow Arena; Birmingham, Alabama
Mar 6, 1993	No. 12	Memphis State	W 78–55	22–4 (8–2)	Myrl Shoemaker Center; Cincinnati, Ohio
Great Midwest Tournament
Mar 12, 1993*	(1) No. 11	vs. (5) DePaul; Semifinals	W 78–69	23–4	Pyramid Arena; Memphis, Tennessee
Mar 13, 1993*	(1) No. 11	at (2) Memphis State; Championship Game	W 77–72	24–4	Pyramid Arena; Memphis, Tennessee
NCAA Tournament
Mar 19, 1993*	(2 E) No. 7	vs. (15 E) Coppin State; First round	W 93–66	25–4	Carrier Dome; Syracuse, New York
Mar 21, 1993*	(2 E) No. 7	vs. (7 E) No. 24 New Mexico State; Second Round	W 92–55	26–4	Carrier Dome; Syracuse, New York
Mar 26, 1993*	(2 E) No. 7	vs. (6 E) Virginia; East Regional semifinal – Sweet Sixteen	W 71–54	27–4	Brendan Byrne Arena; East Rutherford, New Jersey
Mar 28, 1993*	(2 E) No. 7	vs. (1 E) No. 4 North Carolina; East Regional Final – Elite Eight	L 68–75 ^{OT}	27–5	Brendan Byrne Arena; East Rutherford, New Jersey
*Non-conference game. ^{#}Rankings from AP poll. (#) Tournament seedings in parentheses. E=East.

== Rankings ==
Ranking movements Legend: ██ Increase in ranking ██ Decrease in ranking т = Tied with team above or below
	Week																		
Poll	Pre	1	2	3	4	5	6	7	8	9	10	11	12	13	14	15	16	17	Final
AP	21	23	22	19	19	23	21	16	11	9	6	4	8	8	10	12	11	7	Not released
Coaches	19 т	19	20	24	18	23	21	16	11	8	6	4	8	7	8	10	9	7	6

== NBA draft ==
Round	Pick	Player	NBA club
1	25	Corie Blount	Chicago Bulls
2	37	Nick Van Exel	Los Angeles Lakers
