= 1992–93 Auburn Tigers men's basketball team =

American college basketball season

1992–93 Auburn Tigers men's basketball

NIT, First Round
- Conference: Southeastern Conference
- West
- Record: 15–12 (8–8 SEC)
- Head coach: Tommy Joe Eagles (4th season)
- Captain: Reggie Gallon
- Home arena: Joel H. Eaves Memorial Coliseum

1992–93 Southeastern Conference men's basketball standings
	Conf.				Overall
Team	W		L	PCT	W		L	PCT
East
No. 8 Vanderbilt	14	–	2	.875	28	–	6	.824
No. 2 Kentucky †	13	–	3	.813	30	–	4	.882
Florida	9	–	7	.563	16	–	12	.571
Georgia	8	–	8	.500	15	–	14	.517
South Carolina	5	–	11	.313	9	–	18	.333
Tennessee	4	–	12	.250	13	–	17	.433
West
No. 12 Arkansas	10	–	6	.625	22	–	9	.710
LSU	9	–	7	.563	22	–	11	.667
Auburn	8	–	8	.500	15	–	12	.556
Alabama	7	–	9	.438	16	–	13	.552
Mississippi State	5	–	11	.313	13	–	16	.448
Ole Miss	4	–	12	.250	10	–	18	.357
† 1993 SEC tournament winner Rankings from AP poll

The 1992–93 Auburn Tigers men's basketball team represented Auburn University in the 1992–93 college basketball season. The team's head coach was Tommy Joe Eagles, who was in his fourth season at Auburn. The team played their home games at Joel H. Eaves Memorial Coliseum in Auburn, Alabama. They finished the season 15–12, 8–8 in SEC play. They lost to Tennessee in the first round of the SEC tournament. They received an invitation to the National Invitation Tournament, where they lost to Clemson in the first round.

== Schedule and results ==
Date time, TV	Rank^{#}	Opponent^{#}	Result	Record	Site (attendance) city, state
Regular season
Dec 1, 1992*		Louisiana College	W 98-60	1-0	Auburn, AL; Beard-Eaves Memorial Coliseum
Dec 5, 1992*		at James Madison	L 80-89	1-1	JMU Convocation Center; Harrisonburg, VA
January 20, 1993; 7:00 p.m., JPS		Tennessee	W 88-75		Beard-Eaves Memorial Coliseum; Auburn, AL
SEC Tournament
March 11, 1993; JPS	(W3)	vs. (E6) Tennessee; First Round	L 76-78	15-11	Rupp Arena; Lexington, KY
National Invitational Tournament
March 18, 1993		at Clemson; First Round	L 72-84	15-12	Littlejohn Coliseum; Clemson, SC
*Non-conference game. ^{#}Rankings from AP Poll. (#) Tournament seedings in parentheses. All times are in Central Time.
