= 1992–93 SMU Mustangs men's basketball team =

American college basketball season

1992–93 SMU Mustangs men's basketball

SWC regular season champions

NCAA tournament, first round, L 71–80 vs. BYU
- Conference: Southwest Conference
- Record: 20–8 (12–2 SWC)
- Head coach: John Shumate
- Home arena: Moody Coliseum

1992–93 Southwest Conference men's basketball standings
	Conf.				Overall
Team	W		L	PCT	W		L	PCT
SMU	12	–	2	.857	20	–	8	.714
Rice	11	–	3	.786	18	–	10	.643
Houston	9	–	5	.643	21	–	9	.700
Baylor	7	–	7	.500	16	–	11	.593
Texas Tech †	6	–	8	.429	18	–	12	.600
Texas A&M	5	–	9	.357	10	–	17	.370
Texas	4	–	10	.286	11	–	17	.393
TCU	2	–	12	.143	6	–	22	.214
† 1993 SWC tournament winner Rankings from AP Poll

The 1992–93 SMU Mustangs men's basketball team represented Southern Methodist University during the 1992–93 men's college basketball season. They received the conference's automatic bid to the NCAA Tournament where they lost in the first round to BYU.

== Schedule ==
Date time, TV	Rank^{#}	Opponent^{#}	Result	Record	Site city, state
December 1*		Texas State	W 90–69	1–0	Moody Coliseum; University Park, Texas
December 5*		at Tulane	L 92–103 ^{OT}	1–1	Avron B. Fogelman Arena; New Orleans, Louisiana
December 9*		Oral Roberts	W 112–73	2–1	Moody Coliseum; University Park, Texas
December 12*		at Vanderbilt	L 86–95	2–2	Memorial Gymnasium; Nashville, Tennessee
December 23*		North Texas	W 110–94	3–2	Moody Coliseum; University Park, Texas
December 28*		San Diego	W 106–71	4–2	Moody Coliseum; University Park, Texas
December 30*		Stetson	W 87–77	5–2	Moody Coliseum; University Park, Texas
January 2*		vs. Oklahoma State	L 59–75	5–3	Tulsa, Oklahoma
January 4*		No. 13 Arkansas	L 53–72	5–4	Moody Coliseum; University Park, Texas
January 6*		at St. Louis	W 63–56	6–4	St. Louis Arena; St. Louis, Missouri
January 10		at Texas	W 102–92	7–4 (1–0)	Frank Erwin Center; Austin, Texas
January 13*		St. Louis	W 66–59	8–4 (1–0)	Moody Coliseum; University Park, Texas
January 16		at Texas Tech	W 61–59	9–4 (2–0)	Lubbock Municipal Coliseum; Lubbock, Texas
January 20		at TCU	W 79–65	10–4 (3–0)	Daniel-Meyer Coliseum; Fort Worth, Texas
January 23		at Houston	L 75–85	10–5 (3–1)	Hofheinz Pavilion; Houston, Texas
January 27		Texas A&M	W 68–65	11–5 (4–1)	Moody Coliseum; University Park, Texas
January 30		No. 25 Houston	W 70–60	12–5 (5–1)	Moody Coliseum; University Park, Texas
February 3		at Baylor	W 105–92	13–5 (6–1)	Ferrell Center; Waco, Texas
February 6		Rice	W 78–77	14–5 (7–1)	Moody Coliseum; University Park, Texas
February 9		Texas Tech	W 78–75	15–5 (8–1)	Moody Coliseum; University Park, Texas
February 16		TCU	W 78–77	16–5 (9–1)	Moody Coliseum; University Park, Texas
February 20*		at Oral Roberts	W 102–95	17–5 (9–1)	Mabee Center; Tulsa, Oklahoma
February 25		at Texas A&M	W 84–73	18–5 (10–1)	G. Rollie White Coliseum; College Station, Texas
February 27		at Rice	L 67–90	18–6 (10–2)	Tudor Fieldhouse; Houston, Texas
March 3		Baylor	W 81–74	19–6 (11–2)	Moody Coliseum; University Park, Texas
March 6		Texas	W 96–80	20–6 (12–2)	Moody Coliseum; University Park, Texas
Southwest tournament
March 12		vs. TCU	L 71–72	20–7 (12–2)	Moody Coliseum; University Park, Texas
1993 NCAA tournament
March 18*	(10 MW)	vs. (7 MW) BYU; First round	L 71–80	20–8 (12–2)	Rosemont Horizon; Rosemont, Illinois
*Non-conference game. ^{#}Rankings from AP poll. (#) Tournament seedings in parentheses. MW=Midwest. All times are in Central Time.
