= 1992–93 Washington Huskies men's basketball team =

American college basketball season

1992–93 Washington Huskies men's basketball
- Conference: Pacific-10 Conference
- Record: 13–14 (7–11 Pac-10)
- Head coach: Lynn Nance (4th season)
- Home arena: Hec Edmundson Pavilion

1992–93 Pacific-10 Conference men's basketball standings
	Conf.				Overall
Team	W		L	PCT	W		L	PCT
No. 5 Arizona	17	–	1	.944	24	–	4	.857
California	12	–	6	.667	21	–	9	.700
UCLA	11	–	7	.611	22	–	11	.667
Arizona State	11	–	7	.611	18	–	10	.643
USC	9	–	9	.500	18	–	12	.600
Oregon State	9	–	9	.500	13	–	14	.481
Washington	7	–	11	.389	13	–	14	.481
Washington State	9	–	9	.500	15	–	12	.556
Oregon	3	–	15	.167	10	–	20	.333
Stanford	2	–	16	.111	7	–	23	.233
Rankings from AP Poll

The 1992–93 Washington Huskies men's basketball team represented the University of Washington for the 1992–93 NCAA Division I men's basketball season. Led by fourth-year head coach Lynn Nance, the Huskies were members of the Pacific-10 Conference and played their home games on campus at Hec Edmundson Pavilion in Seattle, Washington.

The Huskies were 13–14 overall in the regular season and 7–11 in conference play, eighth in the standings. They ended the season on a four-game losing streak, concluding with a home loss to rival Washington State. There was no conference tournament this season; last played in 1990, it resumed in 2002.

Alumnus Nance resigned on March 19, and was succeeded in April by Bob Bender, the head coach at Illinois State.
