= 1992 Maui Invitational =

College basketball tournament

1992 Maui Invitational Tournament
- Season: 1992–93
- Teams: 8
- Finals site: Lahaina Civic Center; Maui, Hawaii
- Champions: Duke (1st title)
- Runner-up: BYU (1st title game)
- Semifinalists: Memphis State; LSU
- Winning coach: Mike Krzyzewski (1st title)
- MVP: Bobby Hurley & Penny Hardaway (Duke & Memphis State)

The 1992 Maui Invitational Tournament was an early-season college basketball tournament that was played, for the 9th time, from December 21 to 23, 1992. The tournament, which began in 1984, was part of the 1992-93 NCAA Division I men's basketball season. The tournament was played at the Lahaina Civic Center in Maui, Hawaii and was won by the Duke Blue Devils. It was the first title for the program and its head coach Mike Krzyzewski.

== Bracket ==
5th place game December 23
9	Oklahoma	108
DePaul	94
7th place game
Chaminade	71
Stanford	63

Consolation 2nd Round; December 22
Chaminade	88
9	Oklahoma	105
Stanford	67
DePaul	76

First Round; December 21
Chaminade	56
Memphis State	64
BYU	76
9	Oklahoma	75
LSU	72
Stanford	63
1	Duke	89
DePaul	73

Semifinals; December 22
Memphis State	67
BYU	73
LSU	67
1	Duke	96

Championship; December 23
BYU	66
1	Duke	89
3rd place game
Memphis State	70
LSU	66
