= 1993 Southwest Conference men's basketball tournament =

- Classification: Division I
- Season: 1992–93
- Teams: 8
- Site: Reunion Arena; Dallas, Texas
- Champions: Texas Tech (4th title)
- Winning coach: James Dickey (1st title)
- MVP: Lance Hughes (Texas Tech)

1992–93 Southwest Conference men's basketball standings
	Conf.				Overall
Team	W		L	PCT	W		L	PCT
SMU	12	–	2	.857	20	–	8	.714
Rice	11	–	3	.786	18	–	10	.643
Houston	9	–	5	.643	21	–	9	.700
Baylor	7	–	7	.500	16	–	11	.593
Texas Tech †	6	–	8	.429	18	–	12	.600
Texas A&M	5	–	9	.357	10	–	17	.370
Texas	4	–	10	.286	11	–	17	.393
TCU	2	–	12	.143	6	–	22	.214
† 1993 SWC tournament winner Rankings from AP Poll

The 1993 Southwest Conference men's basketball tournament was held March 12–14, 1993, at Reunion Arena in Dallas, Texas.

Number 5 seed Texas Tech defeated 3 seed Houston 88-76 to win their 4th championship and receive the conference's automatic bid to the 1993 NCAA tournament.

== Format and seeding ==
The tournament consisted of the top 8 teams playing in a single-elimination tournament.

Place	Seed	Team	Conference			Overall		
Place	Seed	Team	W	L	%	W	L	%
1	1	SMU	12	2	.857	20	8	.714
2	2	Rice	11	3	.786	18	10	.643
3	3	Houston	9	5	.643	21	9	.700
4	4	Baylor	7	7	.500	16	11	.593
5	5	Texas Tech	6	8	.429	18	12	.600
6	6	Texas A&M	5	9	.357	10	17	.370
7	7	Texas	4	10	.286	11	17	.393
8	8	TCU	2	12	.143	6	22	.214

== Tournament ==
Quarterfinals; Friday, March 12
1	SMU	71
8	TCU	72
4	Baylor	74
5	Texas Tech	83
3	Houston	84
6	Texas A&M	68
2	Rice	76
7	Texas	81

Semifinals; Saturday, March 13
8	TCU	59
5	Texas Tech	76
3	Houston	58
7	Texas	50

Finals; Sunday, March 14
5	Texas Tech	88
3	Houston	76
