= 1992–93 UCLA Bruins men's basketball team =

American college basketball season

1992–93 UCLA Bruins men's basketball

NCAA tournament, Round of 32
- Conference: Pacific-10 Conference

Ranking
- Coaches: No. 24
- Record: 22–11 (11–7 Pac-10)
- Head coach: Jim Harrick (5th season)
- Assistant coaches: Mark Gottfried; Lorenzo Romar
- Captain: Mitchell Butler
- Home arena: Pauley Pavilion

1992–93 Pacific-10 Conference men's basketball standings
	Conf.				Overall
Team	W		L	PCT	W		L	PCT
No. 5 Arizona	17	–	1	.944	24	–	4	.857
California	12	–	6	.667	21	–	9	.700
UCLA	11	–	7	.611	22	–	11	.667
Arizona State	11	–	7	.611	18	–	10	.643
USC	9	–	9	.500	18	–	12	.600
Oregon State	9	–	9	.500	13	–	14	.481
Washington	7	–	11	.389	13	–	14	.481
Washington State	9	–	9	.500	15	–	12	.556
Oregon	3	–	15	.167	10	–	20	.333
Stanford	2	–	16	.111	7	–	23	.233
Rankings from AP Poll

The 1992–93 UCLA Bruins men's basketball team represented the University of California, Los Angeles in the 1992–93 NCAA Division I men's basketball season. The Bruins began the season ranked 24th in the AP Poll. The team finished 3rd in the conference. The Bruins competed in the 1993 NCAA Division I men's basketball tournament. The UCLA Bruins beat Iowa State in the first round, 81–70, and lost to Fab Five-led Michigan in the second round, 86–84 in overtime after leading by as many as nineteen points.

== Roster ==
1992–93 UCLA Bruins men's basketball team
Players
Coaches

Pos.	#	Name	Height	Weight	Year	Hometown
G	12	David Boyle	6 ft 5 in (1.96 m)	—	Fr
G	4	Marquis Burns	6 ft 4 in (1.93 m)	—	Fr
F	23	Mitchell Butler (C)	6 ft 5 in (1.96 m)	—	Sr	Los Angeles, California
F	30	Kevin Dempsey	6 ft 6 in (1.98 m)	—	Fr
G	11	Tyus Edney	5 ft 10 in (1.78 m)	—	So	Gardena, California
C	21	Mike Lanier	7 ft 7 in (2.31 m)	—	Sr
C	35	Ike Nwankwo	6 ft 11 in (2.11 m)	—	Fr	Houston, Texas
F	31	Ed O'Bannon	6 ft 8 in (2.03 m)	—	So	Los Angeles, California
C	3	Richard Petruska	6 ft 10 in (2.08 m)	—	Sr
G	21	Shon Tarver	6 ft 6 in (1.98 m)	—	Jr
C	25	George Zidek	7 ft 0 in (2.13 m)	—	So	Gottwaldov, Czechoslovakia
C	14	Rodney Zimmerman	6 ft 9 in (2.06 m)	—	Jr

Head coach

Jim Harrick (Morris Harvey College)

Assistant coach(es)

- Mark Gottfried (Alabama)
- Steve Lavin (Chapman)
- Lorenzo Romar (Washington)

Legend

- (C) Team captain
- (S) Suspended
- (I) Ineligible
- (W) Walk-on
- Injured
- Current redshirt

Roster
Last update: 30 January 2018

== Schedule ==
Date time, TV	Rank^{#}	Opponent^{#}	Result	Record	Site city, state
Preseason NIT
November 18, 1992	No. 24	Saint Louis; First Round	W 68–54	1–0	Pauley Pavilion (6,612); Los Angeles, CA
November 20, 1992	No. 24	UTEP; Second Round	W 73–72	2–0	Pauley Pavilion (7,481); Los Angeles, CA
November 25, 1992	No. 21	vs. No. 6 Seton Hall; Semifinals	L 64–73	2–1	Madison Square Garden (12,641); New York, NY
November 27, 1992	No. 21	vs. No. 7 Florida State; Third Place Game	W 86–83	3–1	Madison Square Garden (14,338); New York, NY
Regular Season
December 5, 1992	No. 16	Santa Clara	W 69–60	4–1	Pauley Pavilion (5,667); Los Angeles, CA
December 12, 1992	No. 13	San Diego	W 90–63	5–1	Pauley Pavilion (5,326); Los Angeles, CA
December 19, 1992	No. 13	vs. Georgia; Kuppenheimer Classic	W 68–63	6–1	Georgia Dome (28,885); Atlanta, GA
December 22, 1992	No. 12	Cal State Northridge	W 80–73	7–1	Pauley Pavilion (5,638); Los Angeles, CA
December 28, 1992	No. 11	at Pittsburgh	L 79–91	7–2	Pittsburgh Civic Arena (13,071); Pittsburgh, PA
December 30, 1992	No. 11	Cal State Fullerton	W 90–82	8–2	Pauley Pavilion (6,039); Los Angeles, CA
January 2, 1993	No. 11	Houston	W 87–78	9–2	Pauley Pavilion (7,047); Los Angeles, CA
January 7, 1993	No. 15	No. 20 Arizona	L 80–82	9–3 (0–1)	Pauley Pavilion (9,256); Los Angeles, CA
January 9, 1993	No. 15	Arizona State	W 89–85	10–3 (1–1)	Pauley Pavilion (7,192); Los Angeles, CA
January 14, 1993	No. 16	at Oregon	W 99–87	11–3 (2–1)	McArthur Court (7,489); Eugene, OR
January 16, 1993	No. 16	at Oregon State	L 73–79	11–4 (2–2)	Gill Coliseum (9,632); Corvallis, OR
January 21, 1993	No. 23	Stanford	W 84–76	12–4 (3–2)	Pauley Pavilion (8,767); Los Angeles, CA
January 24, 1993	No. 23	California	L 82–104	12–5 (3–3)	Pauley Pavilion (12,563); Los Angeles, CA
January 28, 1993		at USC	W 90–80	13–5 (4–3)	Los Angeles Memorial Sports Arena (10,141); Los Angeles, CA
January 31, 1993		Notre Dame	W 68–65	14–5	Pauley Pavilion (6,251); Los Angeles, CA
February 4, 1993		at Washington	L 67–81	14–6 (4–4)	Hec Edmundson Pavilion (3,788); Seattle, WA
February 6, 1993		at Washington State	L 56–67	14–7 (4–5)	Beasley Coliseum (8,192); Corvallis, OR
February 11, 1993		Oregon State	W 76–75	15–7 (5–5)	Pauley Pavilion (7,921); Los Angeles, CA
February 14, 1993		Oregon	W 97–90	16–7 (6–5)	Pauley Pavilion (6,861); Los Angeles, CA
February 18, 1993		at Stanford	W 72–64	17–7 (7–5)	Maples Pavilion (3,776); Stanford, CA
February 20, 1993		at California	W 85–71	18–7 (8–5)	Oakland Arena (15,039); Oakland, CA
February 25, 1993		USC	L 62–72	18–8 (8–6)	Pauley Pavilion (12,767); Los Angeles, CA
February 28, 1993		at No. 9 Duke	L 67–78	18–9	Cameron Indoor Stadium (9,314); Durham, NC
March 04, 1993		Washington State	W 71–70	19–9 (9–6)	Pauley Pavilion (8,231); Los Angeles, CA
March 06, 1993		Washington	W 93–64	20–9 (10–6)	Pauley Pavilion (9,152); Los Angeles, CA
March 11, 1993		at Arizona State	W 77–74	21–9 (11–6)	ASU Activity Center (10,185); Tempe, AZ
March 13, 1993		at No. 6 Arizona	L 80–99	21–10 (11–7)	McKale Center (13,990); Tucson, AZ
NCAA tournament
March 19, 1993		vs. Iowa State; First Round	W 81–70	22–10	McKale Center (13,532); Tucson, AZ
March 21, 1993		vs. No. 3 Michigan; Second Round	L 84–86 ^{OT}	22–11	McKale Center (13,534); Tucson, AZ
*Non-conference game. ^{#}Rankings from AP Poll. (#) Tournament seedings in parentheses. All times are in Pacific Time.

== Starting lineup ==
Position	Player	Class
F	Mitchell Butler	Sr.
F	Ed O'Bannon	So.
F	Richard Petruska	Sr.
G	Shon Tarver	Jr.
G	Tyus Edney	So.

Other players: C George Zidek (Fr), Ike Nwankwo, Kevin Dempsey, Rodney Zimmerman, David Boyle, Mike Lanier, Marquis Burns, Steve Elkind
