= 1992–93 Vanderbilt Commodores men's basketball team =

American college basketball season

1992–93 Vanderbilt Commodores men's basketball

SEC Regular season champion

NCAA tournament, Sweet Sixteen
- Conference: Southeastern Conference

Ranking
- Coaches: No. 8
- AP: No. 8
- Record: 28–6 (14–2 SEC)
- Head coach: Eddie Fogler (4th season)
- Home arena: Memorial Gymnasium

1992–93 Southeastern Conference men's basketball standings
	Conf.				Overall
Team	W		L	PCT	W		L	PCT
East
No. 8 Vanderbilt	14	–	2	.875	28	–	6	.824
No. 2 Kentucky †	13	–	3	.813	30	–	4	.882
Florida	9	–	7	.563	16	–	12	.571
Georgia	8	–	8	.500	15	–	14	.517
South Carolina	5	–	11	.313	9	–	18	.333
Tennessee	4	–	12	.250	13	–	17	.433
West
No. 12 Arkansas	10	–	6	.625	22	–	9	.710
LSU	9	–	7	.563	22	–	11	.667
Auburn	8	–	8	.500	15	–	12	.556
Alabama	7	–	9	.438	16	–	13	.552
Mississippi State	5	–	11	.313	13	–	16	.448
Ole Miss	4	–	12	.250	10	–	18	.357
† 1993 SEC tournament winner Rankings from AP poll

The 1992–93 Vanderbilt Commodores men's basketball men's basketball team represented Vanderbilt University as a member of the Southeastern Conference during the 1992–93 college basketball season. The team was led by head coach Eddie Fogler and played its home games at Memorial Gymnasium.

The Commodores won the SEC regular season title, received an at-large bid to the NCAA tournament as No. 3 seed in the West region, and made a run to the Sweet Sixteen. The team finished with a 28–6 record (14–2 SEC, 1st).

== Roster ==
1992–93 Vanderbilt Commodores men's basketball team
Players
Coaches

Pos.	#	Name	Height	Weight	Year	Hometown
G	20	Kevin Anglin	6 ft 4 in (1.93 m)	186 lb (84 kg)	Sr	Franklin, Tennessee
G	10	Aaron Beth	5 ft 10 in (1.78 m)	157 lb (71 kg)	Jr	Calvert City, Kentucky
F	5	Bruce Elder	6 ft 5 in (1.96 m)	194 lb (88 kg)	Sr	Marietta, Georgia
F	41	Dan Hall	6 ft 8 in (2.03 m)	221 lb (100 kg)	Jr	Gilbertsville, Kentucky
C	33	Chris Lawson	6 ft 10 in (2.08 m)	259 lb (117 kg)	Jr	Bloomington, Indiana
G	14	Billy McCaffrey	6 ft 3 in (1.91 m)	175 lb (79 kg)	Jr	Allentown, Pennsylvania
F	23	Ronnie McMahan	6 ft 5 in (1.96 m)	182 lb (83 kg)	So	Athens, Tennessee
F	40	Bryan Milburn	6 ft 7 in (2.01 m)	218 lb (99 kg)	So	Russell Springs, Kentucky
G	22	Frank Seckar	6 ft 1 in (1.85 m)	155 lb (70 kg)	Fr	Oshkosh, Wisconsin
F	32	Chad Sheron	6 ft 7 in (2.01 m)	186 lb (84 kg)	Fr	Vancouver, Washington
C	50	Chris Woods	6 ft 11 in (2.11 m)	242 lb (110 kg)	So	St. Charles, Missouri

Head coach

- Eddie Fogler (North Carolina)

Assistant coach(es)

- Rick Callahan
- Neil Dougherty
- Jeff Lebo

Legend

- (C) Team captain
- (S) Suspended
- (I) Ineligible
- (W) Walk-on
- Injured
- Current redshirt

== Schedule and results ==
Date time, TV	Rank^{#}	Opponent^{#}	Result	Record	Site (attendance) city, state
Regular season
Nov 25, 1992*		vs. UAB; Great Alaska Shootout	W 81–63	1–0	Sullivan Arena; Anchorage, Alaska
Nov 27, 1992*		vs. Illinois; Great Alaska Shootout	L 77–93	1–1	Sullivan Arena (6,003); Anchorage, Alaska
Nov 28, 1992*		vs. Oregon; Great Alaska Shootout	W 83–81	2–1	Sullivan Arena; Anchorage, Alaska
Dec 3, 1992*		Northwestern	W 86–66	3–1	Memorial Gymnasium; Nashville, Tennessee
Dec 5, 1992*		at Dayton	W 84–53	4–1	University of Dayton Arena; Dayton, Ohio
Dec 9, 1992*		No. 9 Louisville	W 90–88	5–1	Memorial Gymnasium; Nashville, Tennessee
Dec 12, 1992*		SMU	W 95–86	6–1	Memorial Gymnasium; Nashville, Tennessee
Dec 18, 1992*		vs. North Carolina A&T	W 87–51	7–1	Dunn Center; Clarksville, Tennessee
Dec 19, 1992*		at Austin Peay	W 116–71	8–1	Dunn Center; Clarksville, Tennessee
Dec 28, 1992*	No. 24	Air Force	W 95–50	9–1	Memorial Gymnasium; Nashville, Tennessee
Dec 29, 1992*	No. 24	Bowling Green State	W 96–69	10–1	Memorial Gymnasium; Nashville, Tennessee
Jan 2, 1993	No. 24	Alabama	W 76–73	11–1 (1–0)	Memorial Gymnasium; Nashville, Tennessee
Jan 6, 1993*	No. 18	at Memphis State	L 78–84	11–2	Pyramid Arena; Memphis, Tennessee
Jan 9, 1993; SportsChannel	No. 18	at Florida	L 61–62	11–3 (1–1)	Stephen C. O'Connell Center; Gainesville, Florida
Jan 13, 1993; JP Sports		No. 1 Kentucky	W 101–86	12–3 (2–1)	Memorial Gymnasium; Nashville, Tennessee
Jan 16, 1993		Georgia	W 78–66	13–3 (3–1)	Memorial Gymnasium; Nashville, Tennessee
Jan 20, 1993	No. 19	No. 8 Arkansas	W 102–89	14–3 (4–1)	Memorial Gymnasium; Nashville, Tennessee
Jan 27, 1993	No. 12	at Tennessee	W 82–65	15–3 (5–1)	Thompson-Boling Arena; Knoxville, Tennessee
Jan 30, 1993; JP Sports	No. 12	at Auburn	W 73–70	16–3 (6–1)	Beard–Eaves–Memorial Coliseum; Auburn, Alabama
Feb 3, 1993*	No. 11	South Carolina	W 76–72	17–3 (7–1)	Memorial Gymnasium; Nashville, Tennessee
Feb 6, 1993	No. 11	at No. 2 Kentucky	L 67–82	17–4 (7–2)	Rupp Arena; Lexington, Kentucky
Feb 10, 1993	No. 11	Ole Miss	W 89–59	18–4 (8–2)	Memorial Gymnasium; Nashville, Tennessee
Feb 13, 1993*	No. 11	Middle Tennessee State	W 81–51	19–4	Memorial Gymnasium; Nashville, Tennessee
Feb 17, 1993	No. 11	at LSU	W 87–66	20–4 (9–2)	Maravich Assembly Center; Baton Rouge, Louisiana
Feb 20, 1993	No. 11	Florida	W 82–64	21–4 (10–2)	Memorial Gymnasium; Nashville, Tennessee
Feb 24, 1993	No. 8	at Georgia	W 87–83	22–4 (11–2)	Stegeman Coliseum; Athens, Georgia
Feb 27, 1993	No. 8	at Mississippi State	W 80–39	23–4 (12–2)	Humphrey Coliseum; Starkville, Mississippi
Mar 2, 1993	No. 7	Tennessee	W 90–82	24–4 (13–2)	Memorial Gymnasium; Nashville, Tennessee
Mar 6, 1993	No. 7	at South Carolina	W 77–73	25–4 (14–2)	Carolina Coliseum; Columbia, South Carolina
SEC tournament
Mar 12, 1993*; JP Sports	No. 5	vs. Alabama; Quarterfinals	W 76–59	26–4	Rupp Arena; Lexington, Kentucky
Mar 13, 1993*; JP Sports	No. 5	vs. LSU; Semifinals	L 62–72	26–5	Rupp Arena; Lexington, Kentucky
NCAA tournament
Mar 18, 1993*	(3 W) No. 8	vs. (14 W) Boise State; First round	W 92–72	27–5	Jon M. Huntsman Center; Salt Lake City, Utah
Mar 20, 1993*	(3 W) No. 8	vs. (6 W) Illinois; Second Round	W 85–68	28–5	Jon M. Huntsman Center (12,084); Salt Lake City, Utah
Mar 26, 1993*; CBS	(3 W) No. 8	vs. (7 W) Temple; West Regional semifinal – Sweet Sixteen	L 59–67	28–6	Kingdome; Seattle, Washington
*Non-conference game. ^{#}Rankings from AP poll. (#) Tournament seedings in parentheses. W=West. All times are in Central Time.

== Awards and honors ==
- Billy McCaffrey – SEC co-Player of the Year
