= 1992–93 Alabama Crimson Tide men's basketball team =

American college basketball season

1992–93 Alabama Crimson Tide men's basketball

NIT, First round
- Conference: Southeastern Conference
- Record: 16–13 (7–9 SEC)
- Head coach: David Hobbs (1st season)
- Assistant coach: James Green (1st season)
- Home arena: Coleman Coliseum

1992–93 Southeastern Conference men's basketball standings
	Conf.				Overall
Team	W		L	PCT	W		L	PCT
East
No. 8 Vanderbilt	14	–	2	.875	28	–	6	.824
No. 2 Kentucky †	13	–	3	.813	30	–	4	.882
Florida	9	–	7	.563	16	–	12	.571
Georgia	8	–	8	.500	15	–	14	.517
South Carolina	5	–	11	.313	9	–	18	.333
Tennessee	4	–	12	.250	13	–	17	.433
West
No. 12 Arkansas	10	–	6	.625	22	–	9	.710
LSU	9	–	7	.563	22	–	11	.667
Auburn	8	–	8	.500	15	–	12	.556
Alabama	7	–	9	.438	16	–	13	.552
Mississippi State	5	–	11	.313	13	–	16	.448
Ole Miss	4	–	12	.250	10	–	18	.357
† 1993 SEC tournament winner Rankings from AP poll

The 1992–93 Alabama Crimson Tide men's basketball team represented the University of Alabama in the 1992-93 NCAA Division I men's basketball season. The team's head coach was David Hobbs, who was in his first season at Alabama. The team played their home games at Coleman Coliseum in Tuscaloosa, Alabama. They finished the season with a record of 16-13. The team's conference record was 7-9, which was good enough for fourth place in the SEC Western Division.

The Tide suffered heavy graduation losses in the off-season. Latrell Sprewell, Robert Horry, and Marcus Webb were all drafted into the NBA, and James Sanders, Bryant Lancaster, and Marcus Campbell all graduated. Key holdovers were junior guard James "Hollywood" Robinson and sophomore forward Jason Caffey. Key signees were freshmen Roy Rogers, Bryan Passink, Anthony Brown, and Marvin Orange, and junior college transfer Shon Peck-Love.

The Tide defeated South Carolina in the first round of the 1993 SEC men's basketball tournament final, but lost in the next round to Vanderbilt. The Tide failed to make the 1993 NCAA tournament, but did receive an invite to the 1993 National Invitation Tournament. In the first meeting in history between the two Alabama-based schools, the Tide lost in the NIT first round to UAB.

== Roster ==
1992–93 Alabama Crimson Tide men's basketball team
Players
Coaches

Pos.	#	Name	Height	Weight	Year	Previous school	Hometown
G	20	James Robinson	6 ft 2 in (1.88 m)	—	Jr	Murrah High School	Jackson, Mississippi
F	35	Jason Caffey	6 ft 8 in (2.03 m)	—	So	Davidson High School	Mobile, Alabama
C	51	Cedric Moore	6 ft 9 in (2.06 m)	—	So	Woodlawn High School	Birmingham, Alabama
F		Andre Perry	6 ft 6 in (1.98 m)	—	Sr
G		Dennis Miller	6 ft 2 in (1.88 m)	—	So
G		Elliot Washington	6 ft 0 in (1.83 m)	—	Sr	Southeast High School	Bradenton, Florida
C	50	Roy Rogers	6 ft 10 in (2.08 m)	—	Fr	Linden, Alabama
G	15	Marvin Orange	6 ft 0 in (1.83 m)	—	Fr	Irmo High School	Irmo, South Carolina
F		Shon Peck-Love	6 ft 5 in (1.96 m)	—	Jr	Three Rivers CC, Missouri	Tuscaloosa, Alabama
G	22	Bryan Passink	6 ft 3 in (1.91 m)	—	Fr	Benedictine Military School	Savannah, Georgia
G		Anthony Brown	6 ft 5 in (1.96 m)	—	Fr

Head coach

- David Hobbs

Assistant coach(es)

Legend

- (C) Team captain
- (S) Suspended
- (I) Ineligible
- (W) Walk-on
- Injured
- Current redshirt

== Schedule and results ==
Date time, TV	Rank^{#}	Opponent^{#}	Result	Record	Site city, state
Regular Season
December 1, 1992*		Wichita State	W 93–71	1–0	Coleman Coliseum; Tuscaloosa, Alabama
December 4, 1992*		Washington State	W 70–68	2–0	Legacy Arena; Birmingham, Alabama
December 12, 1992*		Southern Miss	W 86–76	3–0	Coleman Coliseum; Tuscaloosa, Alabama
December 19, 1992*		at Old Dominion	L 91–93	3–1	Norfolk Scope; Norfolk, Virginia
December 22, 1992*		at Virginia	L 83–86	3–2	University Hall; Charlottesville, Virginia
December 29, 1992*		Rhode Island	W 79–78	4–2	Toso Pavilion; Santa Clara, California
December 30, 1992*		at Santa Clara	W 65–58	5–2	Toso Pavilion; Santa Clara, California
January 2, 1993		at No. 24 Vanderbilt	L 73–76	5–3 (0–1)	Memorial Gymnasium; Nashville, Tennessee
January 4, 1993*		Tennessee State	W 95–80	6–3	Coleman Coliseum; Tuscaloosa, Alabama
January 6, 1993		LSU	W 77–67	7–3 (1–1)	Coleman Coliseum; Tuscaloosa, Alabama
January 9, 1993*		Texas A&M	W 64–58	8–3	Coleman Coliseum; Tuscaloosa, Alabama
January 12, 1993		at No. 9 Arkansas	L 66–74	8–4 (1–2)	Barnhill Arena; Fayetteville, Arkansas
January 16, 1993		Ole Miss	W 80–67	9–4 (2–2)	Coleman Coliseum; Tuscaloosa, Alabama
January 19, 1993		No. 4 Kentucky	L 59–73	9–5 (2–3)	Coleman Coliseum; Tuscaloosa, Alabama
January 23, 1993		at Mississippi State	L 53–66	9–6 (2–4)	Humphrey Coliseum; Starkville, Mississippi
January 27, 1993		Auburn	W 81–78	10–6 (3–4)	Coleman Coliseum; Tuscaloosa, Alabama
February 1, 1993		East Carolina	W 59–54	11–6	Coleman Coliseum; Tuscaloosa, Alabama
February 3, 1993		at Florida	L 59–69	11–7 (3–5)	O'Connell Center; Gainesville, Florida
February 6, 1993		at Tennessee	W 85–81	12–7 (4–5)	Thompson-Boling Arena; Knoxville, Tennessee
February 13, 1993		No. 14 Arkansas	W 93–82	13–7 (5–5)	Coleman Coliseum; Tuscaloosa, Alabama
February 17, 1993		Georgia	L 70–73	13–8 (5–6)	Coleman Coliseum; Tuscaloosa, Alabama
February 20, 1993		at Ole Miss	L 82–83	13–9 (5–7)	Tad Smith Coliseum; Oxford, Mississippi
February 23, 1993		at LSU	L 68–76	13–10 (5–8)	Maravich Assembly Center; Baton Rouge, Louisiana
February 27, 1993		South Carolina	W 97–80	14–10 (6–8)	Coleman Coliseum; Tuscaloosa, Alabama
March 3, 1993		at Auburn	L 70–78	14–11 (6–9)	Memorial Coliseum; Auburn, Alabama
March 6, 1993		Mississippi State	W 92–80	15–11 (7–9)	Memorial Coliseum; Tuscaloosa, Alabama
SEC Tournament
March 11, 1993	(W4)	(E5) South Carolina; First Round	W 86–79	16–11	Rupp Arena; Lexington, Kentucky
March 12, 1993	(W4)	(E1) No. 5 Vanderbilt; Second Round	L 59–76	16–12	Rupp Arena; Lexington, Kentucky
NIT
March 15, 1985*		UAB; First Round	L 56–58	16–13	Coleman Coliseum; Tuscaloosa, Alabama
*Non-conference game. ^{#}Rankings from AP poll. (#) Tournament seedings in parentheses. SE=Southeast.
