= 1992–93 Utah Utes men's basketball team =

American college basketball season

1992–93 Utah Utes men's basketball

WAC Regular season champions

NCAA tournament, Second round
- Conference: Western Athletic Conference

Ranking
- Coaches: No. 20
- AP: No. 19
- Record: 24–7 (15–3 WAC)
- Head coach: Rick Majerus (3rd season)
- Assistant coach: Kirk Earlywine
- Home arena: Jon M. Huntsman Center

1992–93 WAC men's basketball standings
	Conf.				Overall
Team	W		L	PCT	W		L	PCT
No. 19 Utah	15	–	3	.833	24	–	7	.774
BYU	15	–	3	.833	25	–	9	.735
No. 21 New Mexico †	13	–	5	.722	24	–	7	.774
UTEP	10	–	8	.556	21	–	13	.618
Colorado State	9	–	9	.500	17	–	12	.586
Fresno State	8	–	10	.444	13	–	15	.464
Hawaii	7	–	11	.389	12	–	16	.429
Wyoming	7	–	11	.389	13	–	15	.464
San Diego State	3	–	15	.167	8	–	21	.276
Air Force	3	–	15	.167	9	–	19	.321
† 1993 WAC tournament winner Rankings from AP Poll

The 1992–93 Utah Utes men's basketball team represented the University of Utah as a member of the Western Athletic Conference during the 1992–93 men's basketball season. Led by head coach Rick Majerus, the Utes won the WAC regular season title and received a bid to the NCAA tournament. Participating in the Southeast regional, Utah defeated Pittsburgh in the opening round before falling to No. 1 seed Kentucky in the second round. The Utes finished with an overall record of 24–7 (15–3 WAC).

== Roster ==
1992–93 Utah Utes men's basketball team
Players
Coaches

Pos.	#	Name	Height	Weight	Year	Hometown
F	5	Josh Grant	6 ft 9 in (2.06 m)	220 lb (100 kg)	Sr	Salt Lake City, Utah
PG	10	Ted Cierzniak	6 ft 2 in (1.88 m)	195 lb (88 kg)	Fr	Lakewood, Colorado
G	15	Jimmy Soto	5 ft 9 in (1.75 m)	—	Sr
SF	29	Corey Trautner	6 ft 7 in (2.01 m)	230 lb (104 kg)	Fr	Millville, Utah
G/F	32	Phil Dixon	6 ft 5 in (1.96 m)	—	Sr
G	45	Byron Wilson	6 ft 2 in (1.88 m)	210 lb (95 kg)	Sr	Gary, Indiana

Head coach

- Rick Majerus (Marquette)

Assistant coach(es)

- Kirk Earlywine (Campbell)

Legend

- (C) Team captain
- (S) Suspended
- (I) Ineligible
- (W) Walk-on
- Injured
- Current redshirt

== Schedule and results ==
Date time, TV	Rank^{#}	Opponent^{#}	Result	Record	Site city, state
Non-conference regular season
WAC Regular Season
Mar 4, 1993	No. 9	at New Mexico	L 59–69	22–4 (15–2)	University Arena; Albuquerque, New Mexico
Mar 6, 1993	No. 9	at UTEP	L 70–79	22–5 (15–3)	Don Haskins Center; El Paso, Texas
WAC Tournament
Mar 11, 1993*	(1) No. 15	vs. (9) San Diego State; Quarterfinals	W 85–64	23–5	Delta Center; Salt Lake City, Utah
Mar 12, 1993*	(1) No. 15	vs. (4) UTEP; Semifinals	L 85–90 ^{OT}	23–6	Delta Center; Salt Lake City, Utah
NCAA Tournament
Mar 19, 1993*	(8 SE) No. 19	vs. (9 SE) Pittsburgh; First round	W 86–65	24–6	Memorial Gymnasium; Nashville, Tennessee
Mar 21, 1993*	(8 SE) No. 19	vs. (1 SE) No. 2 Kentucky; Second round	L 62–83	24–7	Memorial Gymnasium; Nashville, Tennessee
*Non-conference game. ^{#}Rankings from AP Poll. (#) Tournament seedings in parentheses. SE=Southeast.

== Awards and honors ==
- Josh Grant – WAC Player of the Year (2x)

== Players in the 1993 NBA draft ==
Round	Pick	Player	NBA club
2	43	Josh Grant	Denver Nuggets
2	54	Byron Wilson	Phoenix Suns
