= Nolan Richardson III =

American college basketball coach (1964–2012)

Biographical details
- Born: July 16, 1964; El Paso, Texas, U.S.
- Died: May 13, 2012 (aged 47); Tulsa, Oklahoma, U.S.
- Education: Oklahoma State University; Langston University (B.S., 1995)

Playing career
- 1983–1985: Tyler JC
- 1985–1987: Oklahoma State
- Position: Guard

Coaching career (HC unless noted)
- 1987–1990: Langston (assistant)
- 1990–2000: Arkansas (assistant)
- 2000–2003: Tennessee State

Head coaching record
- Overall: 23–41

Nolan Richardson III (July 16, 1964 – May 13, 2012) was an American college basketball coach and the son of National Collegiate Basketball Hall of Fame coach Nolan Richardson.

== Playing career ==
Richardson played for Booker T. Washington High School in Tulsa, Oklahoma, then played two seasons at Tyler Junior College. He transferred for his final two years to Oklahoma State University, where he averaged 6.5 points per game in 37 contests.

== Coaching career ==
He began his coaching career as an assistant at Langston University, where he obtained his college degree in 1995. He then joined his father's staff at Arkansas and remained there for ten seasons. During his time with the Razorbacks, he coached teams that went to two Final Fours and won the 1994 NCAA championship.

In 2000, Richardson was named head coach at Tennessee State University. He went 10-19 and 11-17 in his first two seasons, then began the 2002–03 season 2-5 before he was suspended for violating University policy against bringing guns on campus. Richardson allegedly brought a gun into the Tigers' basketball arena after an argument with assistant coach Hosea Lewis. Richardson ultimately resigned his position.

=== Head coaching record ===
Record table
Season	Team	Overall	Conference	Standing	Postseason
Tennessee State Tigers (Ohio Valley Conference) (2000–2003)
2000–01	Tennessee State	10–19	7–9	T-6th	
2001–02	Tennessee State	11–17	7–9	T-5th	
2002–03	Tennessee State	2–5	0–0		
Tennessee State:		23–41 (.359)	14–18 (.438)		
Total:		23–41 (.359)			
National champion Postseason invitational champion Conference regular season champion Conference regular season and conference tournament champion Division regular season champion Division regular season and conference tournament champion Conference tournament champion

== Death ==
Richardson was found dead in his home on May 13, 2012, of natural causes.
