= 1992–93 Texas Tech Red Raiders basketball team =

American college basketball season

1992–93 Texas Tech Red Raiders basketball

SWC Classic tournament

NCAA Division I men's basketball tournament First round, L, 85–67 v. St. John's
- Conference: Southwest Conference
- Record: 18–12 (6–8 SWC)
- Head coach: James Dickey (2nd season)
- Assistant coach: Doc Sadler (2nd season)
- Home arena: Lubbock Municipal Coliseum

1992–93 Southwest Conference men's basketball standings
	Conf.				Overall
Team	W		L	PCT	W		L	PCT
SMU	12	–	2	.857	20	–	8	.714
Rice	11	–	3	.786	18	–	10	.643
Houston	9	–	5	.643	21	–	9	.700
Baylor	7	–	7	.500	16	–	11	.593
Texas Tech †	6	–	8	.429	18	–	12	.600
Texas A&M	5	–	9	.357	10	–	17	.370
Texas	4	–	10	.286	11	–	17	.393
TCU	2	–	12	.143	6	–	22	.214
† 1993 SWC tournament winner Rankings from AP Poll

The 1992–93 Texas Tech Red Raiders men's basketball team represented Texas Tech University in the Southwest Conference during the 1992–93 NCAA Division I men's basketball season. The head coach was James Dickey, his 2nd year with the team. The Red Raiders played their home games in the Lubbock Municipal Coliseum in Lubbock, Texas. The Red Raiders lost to St. John's in the first round of the 1993 NCAA Division I men's basketball tournament.
