= 1992–93 Washington State Cougars men's basketball team =

Basketball team that represented Washington State University in 1992-1993

1992–93 Washington State Cougars men's basketball
- Conference: Pacific-10
- Record: 15–12 (9–9 Pac-10)
- Head coach: Kelvin Sampson (6th season)
- Home arena: Beasley Coliseum

1992–93 Pacific-10 Conference men's basketball standings
	Conf.				Overall
Team	W		L	PCT	W		L	PCT
No. 5 Arizona	17	–	1	.944	24	–	4	.857
California	12	–	6	.667	21	–	9	.700
UCLA	11	–	7	.611	22	–	11	.667
Arizona State	11	–	7	.611	18	–	10	.643
USC	9	–	9	.500	18	–	12	.600
Oregon State	9	–	9	.500	13	–	14	.481
Washington	7	–	11	.389	13	–	14	.481
Washington State	9	–	9	.500	15	–	12	.556
Oregon	3	–	15	.167	10	–	20	.333
Stanford	2	–	16	.111	7	–	23	.233
Rankings from AP Poll

The 1992–93 Washington State Cougars men's basketball team represented Washington State University for the 1992–93 NCAA Division I men's basketball season. Led by sixth-year head coach Kelvin Sampson, the Cougars were members of the Pacific-10 Conference and played their home games on campus at Beasley Coliseum in Pullman, Washington.

The Cougars were 15–12 overall in the regular season and 9–9 in conference play, tied for fifth in the standings. There was no conference tournament this season; last played in 1990, it resumed in 2002.
