= Frankie Allen =

American men's college basketball coach

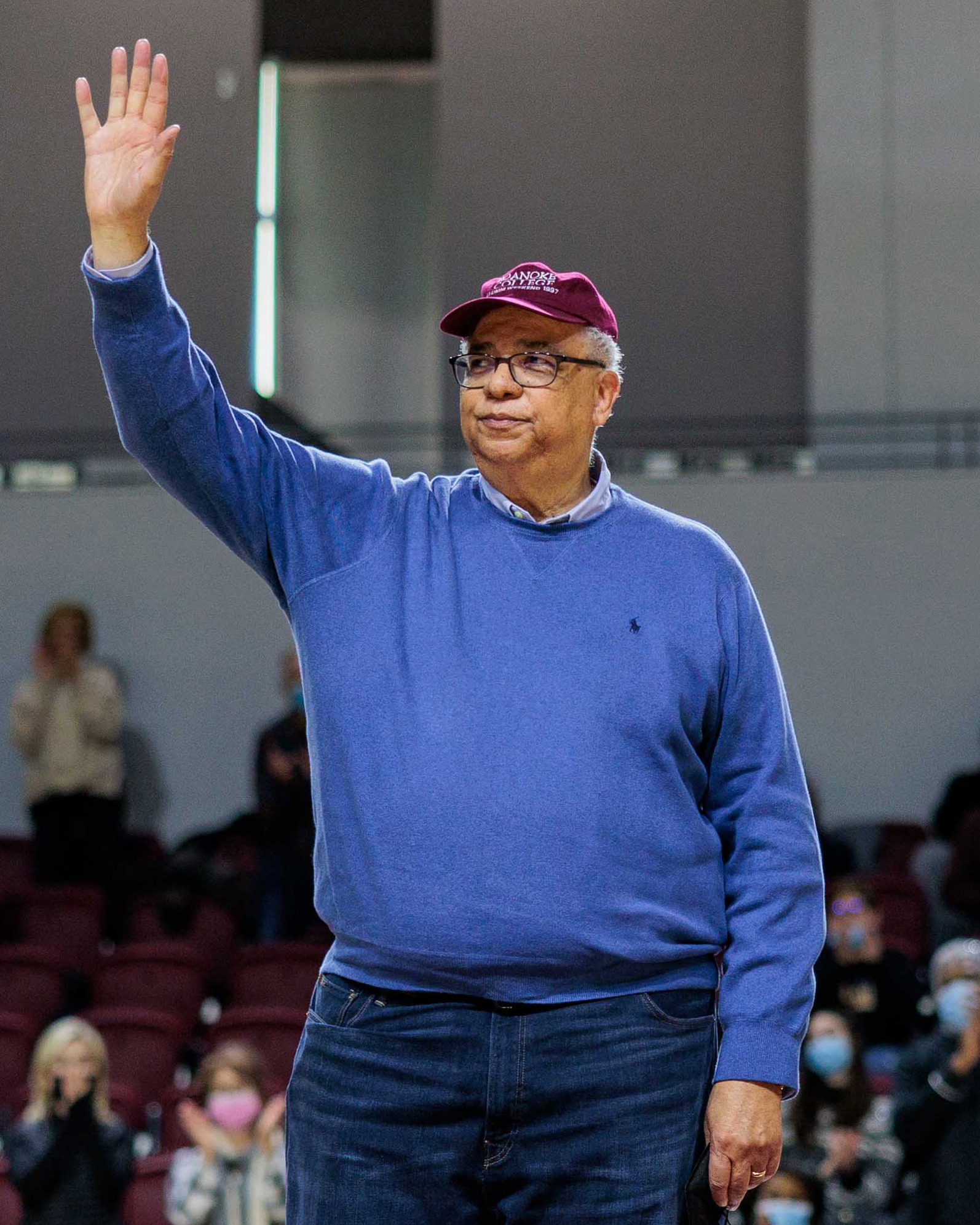

Biographical details
- Born: April 7, 1949 (age 77); Charlottesville, Virginia, U.S.

Playing career
- 1967–1971: Roanoke

Coaching career (HC unless noted)
- 1976–1987: Virginia Tech (assistant)
- 1987–1991: Virginia Tech
- 1991–2000: Tennessee State
- 2000–2005: Howard
- 2005–2006: Radford (assistant)
- 2006–2008: UMBC (assistant)
- 2008–2014: Maryland Eastern Shore

Accomplishments and honors

Awards
- Virginia Sports Hall of Fame (2013)

Frankie Allen (born April 7, 1949) is an American men's college basketball coach who most recently coached at Maryland Eastern Shore. He was also the head coach at Virginia Tech, Tennessee State and Howard, as well as an assistant at Radford and UMBC. His greatest success was at Tennessee State where he won three Ohio Valley Conference titles and was the 1993 national Coach of the Year. Allen played collegiately under Charles Moir at Roanoke College, where he was the school's first African-American athlete. Allen would later coach at Virginia Tech as an assistant under Moir and then follow Moir as the head coach of the Hokies. In 2013, Allen was inducted into the Virginia Sports Hall of Fame.

== Player ==
Born in Charlottesville, Virginia, Allen played collegiately at Roanoke College, where he was the first recruit of new head coach Charles Moir. Roanoke's first African-American athlete, Allen is still the all-time leading scorer (2,780 points) and rebounder (1,758) at any level in Virginia college history. He averaged 24 points and 15 rebounds per game, holds 18 college records, and led Roanoke to its first NCAA tournament appearance in 1968. Allen was the Virginia College Player of the Year in 1969, 1970 and 1971, and was an All-American in 1970 and 1971.

== Coach ==
After several years coaching at the high school level, Allen joined his former college coach, Charles Moir, when Moir was hired for the head coaching job at Virginia Tech. Allen was an assistant at Virginia Tech from 1976 to 1987, helping the team post eight 20-win seasons, four NCAA tournament appearances, and four NIT tournament appearances. Following Moir's dismissal, Allen succeeded him as head coach and remained until 1991.

In 1988, Allen earned Metro Conference, Virginia Sportswriters, and National Rookie Coach of the Year awards at Virginia Tech. In 1993, he was the Basketball Times National Coach of the Year after leading Tennessee State to an Ohio Valley Conference title and to the school's first NCAA tournament appearance. He led Tennessee State to a second tournament appearance in 1994.

Following his stint with the Hokies, he was the head coach at Tennessee State University from 1991 to 2000, and at Howard University from 2000 to 2005. His head coaching record is 223–284.

Howard fired Allen in 2005 after he went 52–83 in five seasons. Allen had dramatically improved the program (before his tenure the school won only three games in two seasons). The progress was deemed insufficient by the school and Allen was released.

After assistant coaching stints at Radford and UMBC, Allen was named head coach of the University of Maryland Eastern Shore on April 10, 2008.

On March 12, 2014, Maryland Eastern Shore announced that Allen would not be retained at head coach.

Allen obtained a master's degree in sports administration from Virginia Tech in 2000. After spending one season as an assistant at Radford University, Allen moved on to take the same position at the University of Maryland, Baltimore County.
