= 1993 NCAA Division I men's basketball tournament =

Edition of USA college basketball tournament

- Season: 1992–93
- Teams: 64
- Finals site: Louisiana Superdome, New Orleans, Louisiana
- Champions: North Carolina Tar Heels (3rd title, 7th title game, 11th Final Four)
- Runner-up: Michigan Wolverines (vacated) (5th title game, 6th Final Four)
- Semifinalists: Kansas Jayhawks (10th Final Four); Kentucky Wildcats (10th Final Four)
- Winning coach: Dean Smith (2nd title)
- MOP: Donald Williams (North Carolina)
- Attendance: 715,246
- Top scorer: Donald Williams (North Carolina) (118 points)

The 1993 NCAA Division I men's basketball tournament involved 64 schools playing in single-elimination play to determine the national champion of men's NCAA Division I college basketball. The 55th annual edition of the tournament began on March 18, 1993, and ended with the championship game on April 5 at the Louisiana Superdome in New Orleans, Louisiana. A total of 63 games were played.

North Carolina, coached by Dean Smith, won the national title with a 77–71 victory in the final game over Michigan, coached by Steve Fisher. Donald Williams of North Carolina was named the tournament's Most Outstanding Player. The most memorable play in the championship game came in the last seconds as Michigan's Chris Webber tried to call a timeout with his team down by 2 points when double-teamed by North Carolina. Michigan had already used all of its timeouts, so Webber's gaffe resulted in a technical foul. Michigan subsequently vacated its entire 1992–93 schedule, including its six NCAA Tournament games, after it emerged that Webber had received under-the-table payments from a booster.

In a game that featured two great individual battles (one between Bobby Hurley and Jason Kidd, and the other between Grant Hill and Lamond Murray), two-time defending champion Duke was upset in the second round by California.

This year's Final Four was the closest the tournament came to having all four top seeds advance to the semifinals until all four did advance in the 2008 tournament. Indiana was the only top seed not to make it out of its regional; it was defeated by the 2-seed Kansas, in the Midwest regional finals. This tournament is also notable for the uneven distribution of first-round upsets. While there were no upsets in the East, one 'minor' upset in the Midwest (9th seed Xavier defeated 8th seed New Orleans; Xavier was the betting favorite at all sports books in Las Vegas), and one 'medium' upset in the Southeast (11th seed Tulane beat 6th seed Kansas State), the West featured three remarkable upsets amongst the top 5 seeds, with a 12, a 13, and a 15-seed advancing to the second round in that region. At the time, 15-seed Santa Clara's victory over 2-seed Arizona was only the second such upset, and following the 2024 tournament, is one of only eleven times that a 15-seed defeated a 2-seed since the tournament field expanded to 64 teams (In 2018, UMBC became one of only two 16-seeds to defeat a 1-seed, ousting Virginia 74–54, with Fairleigh Dickinson's upset of Purdue occurring five years later.).

In this tournament, the Louisiana Superdome was the only site in which the game clock counted down in whole seconds, not tenths of seconds, in the final minute of each period.

== Schedule and venues ==
1993 first and second rounds
1993 Regionals (blue) and Final Four (red)

The following are the sites that were selected to host each round of the 1993 tournament:

First and Second Rounds

- March 18 and 20
  - East Region
    - Lawrence Joel Veterans Memorial Coliseum, Winston-Salem, North Carolina (Host: Wake Forest University)
  - Midwest Region
    - Rosemont Horizon, Rosemont, Illinois (Hosts: DePaul University, Great Midwest Conference)
  - Southeast Region
    - Orlando Arena, Orlando, Florida (Host: Stetson University)
  - West Region
    - Jon M. Huntsman Center, Salt Lake City, Utah (Host: University of Utah)
- March 19 and 21
  - East Region
    - Carrier Dome, Syracuse, New York (Host: Syracuse University)
  - Midwest Region
    - Hoosier Dome, Indianapolis, Indiana (Hosts: Butler University, Midwestern Collegiate Conference)
  - Southeast Region
    - Memorial Gymnasium, Nashville, Tennessee (Host: Vanderbilt University)
  - West Region
    - McKale Center, Tucson, Arizona (Host: University of Arizona)

Regional semifinals and finals (Sweet Sixteen and Elite Eight)

- March 25 and 27
  - Midwest Regional, St. Louis Arena, St. Louis, Missouri (Host: Missouri Valley Conference)
  - Southeast Regional, Charlotte Coliseum, Charlotte, North Carolina (Host: University of North Carolina at Charlotte)
- March 26 and 28
  - East Regional, Meadowlands Arena, East Rutherford, New Jersey (Hosts: Seton Hall University, Big East Conference)
  - West Regional, Kingdome, Seattle, Washington (Host: University of Washington)

National semifinals and championship (Final Four and championship)

- April 3 and 5
  - Louisiana Superdome, New Orleans, Louisiana (Hosts: Tulane University, University of New Orleans)

== Teams ==
There were 30 automatic bids awarded to the tournament - of these, 27 were given to the winners of their conference's tournament, while three were awarded to the team with the best regular-season record in their conference (Big Ten, Ivy League and Pac-10).

Two conferences, the Great Midwest Conference and Trans America Athletic Conference, did not receive automatic bids to the tournament.

Two conference champions made their first NCAA tournament appearances: Tennessee State (Ohio Valley) and Wright State (Mid-Continent).

=== Automatic qualifiers ===
Automatic qualifiers
Conference	Team	Appearance	Last bid
ACC	Georgia Tech	10th	1992
Atlantic 10	UMass	3rd	1992
Big East	Seton Hall	5th	1992
Big Eight	Missouri	14th	1992
Big Sky	Boise State	3rd	1988
Big South	Coastal Carolina	2nd	1991
Big Ten	Indiana	22nd	1992
Big West	Long Beach State	3rd	1977
CAA	East Carolina	2nd	1972
Ivy League	Penn	14th	1987
MAAC	Manhattan	3rd	1958
MAC	Ball State	5th	1988
MCC	Evansville	4th	1992
MEAC	Coppin State	2nd	1990
Metro	Louisville	23rd	1992
Mid-Continent	Wright State	1st	Never
Missouri Valley	Southern Illinois	2nd	1977
NAC	Delaware	2nd	1992
NEC	Rider	2nd	1984
Ohio Valley	Tennessee State	1st	Never
Pac-10	Arizona	12th	1992
Patriot	Holy Cross	3rd	1980
SEC	Kentucky	34th	1992
Southern	Chattanooga	5th	1988
Southland	Northeast Louisiana	6th	1992
Sun Belt	Western Kentucky	13th	1987
SWAC	Southern	6th	1989
SWC	Texas Tech	9th	1986
WAC	New Mexico	5th	1991
West Coast	Santa Clara	9th	1987

=== Tournament seeds ===
East Regional – Brendan Byrne Arena, East Rutherford, New Jersey
Seed	School	Conference	Record	Berth type
1	North Carolina	ACC	28–4	At-Large
2	Cincinnati	Great Midwest	24–4	At-Large
3	UMass	Atlantic 10	23–6	Automatic
4	Arkansas	SEC	20–8	At-Large
5	St. John's	Big East	18–10	At-Large
6	Virginia	ACC	19–9	At-Large
7	New Mexico State (vacated)	Big West	25–7	At-Large
8	Rhode Island	Atlantic 10	18–10	At-Large
9	Purdue	Big Ten	18–9	At-Large
10	Nebraska	Big Eight	20–10	At-Large
11	Manhattan	MAAC	23–6	Automatic
12	Texas Tech	Southwest	18–11	Automatic
13	Holy Cross	Patriot	23–6	Automatic
14	Penn	Ivy League	22–4	Automatic
15	Coppin State	MEAC	22–7	Automatic
16	East Carolina	CAA	13–16	Automatic

Midwest Regional – St. Louis Arena, St. Louis, Missouri
Seed	School	Conference	Record	Berth type
1	Indiana	Big Ten	28–3	Automatic
2	Kansas	Big Eight	25–6	At-Large
3	Duke	ACC	23–7	At-Large
4	Louisville	Metro	20–8	Automatic
5	Oklahoma State	Big Eight	19–8	At-Large
6	California	Pac-10	19–8	At-Large
7	BYU	WAC	24–8	At-Large
8	New Orleans	Sun Belt	26–3	At-Large
9	Xavier	MCC	23–5	At-Large
10	SMU	Southwest	20–7	At-Large
11	LSU	SEC	22–10	At-Large
12	Marquette	Great Midwest	20–7	At-Large
13	Delaware	NAC	22–7	Automatic
14	Southern Illinois	Missouri Valley	23–9	Automatic
15	Ball State	MAC	26–7	Automatic
16	Wright State	Mid-Continent	20–9	Automatic

Southeast Regional – Charlotte Coliseum, Charlotte, North Carolina
Seed	School	Conference	Record	Berth type
1	Kentucky	SEC	26–3	Automatic
2	Seton Hall	Big East	27–6	Automatic
3	Florida State	ACC	22–9	At-Large
4	Iowa	Big Ten	22–8	At-Large
5	Wake Forest	ACC	19–8	At-Large
6	Kansas State	Big Eight	19–10	At-Large
7	Western Kentucky	Sun Belt	24–5	Automatic
8	Utah	WAC	23–6	At-Large
9	Pittsburgh	Big East	17–10	At-Large
10	Memphis State	Great Midwest	20–11	At-Large
11	Tulane	Metro	21–8	At-Large
12	Chattanooga	Southern	26–6	Automatic
13	Northeast Louisiana	Southland	26–4	Automatic
14	Evansville	MCC	23–6	Automatic
15	Tennessee State	Ohio Valley	19–9	Automatic
16	Rider	Northeast	19–10	Automatic

West Regional – Kingdome, Seattle, Washington
Seed	School	Conference	Record	Berth type
1	Michigan (vacated)	Big Ten	26–4	At-Large
2	Arizona	Pac-10	24–3	Automatic
3	Vanderbilt	SEC	26–5	At-Large
4	Georgia Tech	ACC	19–10	Automatic
5	New Mexico	WAC	24–6	Automatic
6	Illinois	Big Ten	18–12	At-Large
7	Temple	Atlantic 10	17–12	At-Large
8	Iowa State	Big Eight	20–10	At-Large
9	UCLA	Pac-10	21–10	At-Large
10	Missouri	Big Eight	19–13	Automatic
11	Long Beach State	Big West	22–9	Automatic
12	George Washington	Atlantic 10	21–9	At-Large
13	Southern	SWAC	20–9	Automatic
14	Boise State	Big Sky	21–7	Automatic
15	Santa Clara	West Coast	18–11	Automatic
16	Coastal Carolina	Big South	22–9	Automatic

== Bracket ==
=== East Regional – East Rutherford, New Jersey ===
First round
1	North Carolina	85
16	East Carolina	65
Winston-Salem
8	Rhode Island	74
9	Purdue	68
5	St. John's	85
12	Texas Tech	67
Winston-Salem
4	Arkansas	94
13	Holy Cross	64
6	Virginia	78
11	Manhattan	66
Syracuse
3	Massachusetts	54
14	Pennsylvania	50
7	New Mexico State	93
10	Nebraska	79
Syracuse
2	Cincinnati	93
15	Coppin State	66

Quarter-finals
1	North Carolina	112
8	Rhode Island	67
5	St. John's	74
4	Arkansas	80
6	Virginia	71
3	Massachusetts	56
7	New Mexico State	55
2	Cincinnati	92

Regional semifinals
1	North Carolina	80
4	Arkansas	74
6	Virginia	54
2	Cincinnati	71

Regional Finals
1	North Carolina	75^{OT}
2	Cincinnati	68

=== Midwest Regional – St. Louis, Missouri ===
First round
1	Indiana	97
16	Wright State	54
Indianapolis
8	New Orleans	55
9	Xavier	73
5	Oklahoma State	74
12	Marquette	62
Indianapolis
4	Louisville	76
13	Delaware	70
6	California	66
11	LSU	64
Rosemont
3	Duke	105
14	Southern Illinois	70
7	BYU	80
10	SMU	71
Rosemont
2	Kansas	94
15	Ball State	72

Quarter-finals
1	Indiana	73
9	Xavier	70
5	Oklahoma State	63
4	Louisville	78
6	California	82
3	Duke	77
7	BYU	76
2	Kansas	90

Regional semifinals
1	Indiana	82
4	Louisville	69
6	California	76
2	Kansas	93

Regional Finals
1	Indiana	77
2	Kansas	83

=== Southeast Regional – Charlotte, North Carolina ===
First round
1	Kentucky	96
16	Rider	52
Nashville
8	Utah	86
9	Pittsburgh	65
5	Wake Forest	81
12	Chattanooga	58
Nashville
4	Iowa	82
13	Northeast Louisiana	69
6	Kansas State	53
11	Tulane	55
Orlando
3	Florida State	82
14	Evansville	70
7	Western Kentucky	55
10	Memphis State	52
Orlando
2	Seton Hall	81
15	Tennessee State	59

Quarter-finals
1	Kentucky	83
8	Utah	62
5	Wake Forest	84
4	Iowa	78
11	Tulane	63
3	Florida State	94
7	Western Kentucky	72
2	Seton Hall	68

Regional semifinals
1	Kentucky	103
5	Wake Forest	69
3	Florida State	81^{OT}
7	Western Kentucky	78

Regional Finals
1	Kentucky	106
3	Florida State	81

=== West Regional – Seattle, Washington ===
First round
1	~~Michigan~~	84
16	Coastal Carolina	53
Tucson
8	Iowa State	70
9	UCLA	81
5	New Mexico	68
12	George Washington	82
Tucson
4	Georgia Tech	78
13	Southern	93
6	Illinois	75
11	Long Beach State	72
Salt Lake City
3	Vanderbilt	92
14	Boise State	72
7	Temple	75
10	Missouri	61
Salt Lake City
2	Arizona	61
15	Santa Clara	64

Quarter-finals
1	~~Michigan~~	86^{OT}
9	UCLA	84
12	George Washington	90
13	Southern	80
6	Illinois	68
3	Vanderbilt	85
7	Temple	68
15	Santa Clara	57

Regional semifinals
1	~~Michigan~~	72
12	George Washington	64
3	Vanderbilt	59
7	Temple	67

Regional Finals
1	~~Michigan~~	77
7	Temple	72

=== Final Four – New Orleans, Louisiana ===
National semifinals
E1	North Carolina	78
MW2	Kansas	68
SE1	Kentucky	78
W1	~~Michigan~~	81^{OT}

National Championship Game
E1	North Carolina	77
W1	~~Michigan~~	71

=== Game summaries ===
==== National Championship ====
Michigan's entire 1992–93 schedule results were vacated, on November 7, 2002, as part of the settlement of the University of Michigan basketball scandal due to Chris Webber’s ineligibility. Unlike forfeiture, a vacated game does not result in the other school being credited with a win, only with Michigan removing the wins from its own record.

== Announcers ==
- James Brown/Jim Nantz and Billy Packer – Brown/Packer, First & Second Round at Winston-Salem, North Carolina; Nantz/Packer, West Regional at Seattle; Final Four at New Orleans, Louisiana
- Dick Stockton and Al McGuire – First & Second Round at Indianapolis, Indiana; Southeast Regional at Charlotte, North Carolina
- Verne Lundquist and Clark Kellogg – First & Second Round at Rosemont, Illinois; East Regional at East Rutherford, New Jersey
- James Brown/Bill Raftery/Lesley Visser – Midwest Regional at St. Louis, Missouri
- Greg Gumbel and Digger Phelps – First & Second Round at Tucson, Arizona
- Sean McDonough and Derrek Dickey – First & Second Round at Orlando, Florida
- Mike Gorman and Larry Farmer – First & Second Round at Salt Lake City, Utah
- Mel Proctor and Dan Bonner – First & Second Round at Syracuse, New York
- Tim Ryan and Ann Meyers – First & Second Round at Nashville, Tennessee

== See also ==
- 1993 NCAA Division II men's basketball tournament
- 1993 NCAA Division III men's basketball tournament
- 1993 NCAA Division I women's basketball tournament
- 1993 National Invitation Tournament
- 1993 NAIA Division I men's basketball tournament
