= 1992–93 Chattanooga Mocs basketball team =

American college basketball season

1992–93 Chattanooga Mocs basketball

SoCon regular season champion SoCon tournament champion

NCAA tournament
- Conference: Southern Conference
- Record: 26–7 (16–2 SoCon)
- Head coach: Mack McCarthy (8th season)
- Home arena: UTC Arena

1992–93 Southern Conference men's basketball standings
| | Conf. | | | | Overall |
| Team | W | | L | PCT | W | | L | PCT |
|---|---|---|---|---|---|---|---|---|
| Chattanooga † | 16 | – | 2 | .889 | 26 | – | 7 | .788 |
| East Tennessee State | 12 | – | 6 | .667 | 19 | – | 10 | .655 |
| Georgia Southern | 12 | – | 6 | .667 | 19 | – | 9 | .679 |
| Marshall | 11 | – | 7 | .611 | 16 | – | 11 | .593 |
| Davidson | 10 | – | 8 | .556 | 14 | – | 14 | .500 |
| The Citadel | 8 | – | 10 | .444 | 10 | – | 17 | .370 |
| Appalachian State | 8 | – | 10 | .444 | 13 | – | 15 | .464 |
| Furman | 8 | – | 10 | .444 | 11 | – | 17 | .393 |
| VMI | 3 | – | 15 | .167 | 5 | – | 22 | .185 |
| Western Carolina | 2 | – | 16 | .111 | 6 | – | 21 | .222 |
† 1993 SoCon Tournament winner As of April 30, 1993; Rankings from AP poll

The 1992–93 Chattanooga Mocs basketball team represented the University of Tennessee at Chattanooga as a member of the Southern Conference during the 1992–93 NCAA Division I men's basketball season. Their head coach was Mack McCarthy and the team played their home games at the UTC Arena. After finishing atop the conference regular season standings, the Mocs won the SoCon tournament, earning an automatic bid to the 1993 NCAA tournament. Chattanooga was beaten in the opening round by No. 5 seed and Wake Forest, 81–58.

== Roster ==
1992–93 Chattanooga Mocs men's basketball team
Players
Coaches

| Pos. | # | Name | Height | Weight | Year | Hometown |
|---|---|---|---|---|---|---|
| G | 10 | Tim Brooks | 6 ft 0 in (1.83 m) | 170 lb (77 kg) | Sr | Louisville, Kentucky |
| F | 40 | Gary Robb | 6 ft 5 in (1.96 m) | 205 lb (93 kg) | Sr | Louisville, Kentucky |

Head coach

- Mack McCarthy

Assistant coach(es)

Legend

- (C) Team captain
- (S) Suspended
- (I) Ineligible
- (W) Walk-on
- Injured
- Current redshirt

Roster

== Schedule and results ==
| Date time, TV | Rank^{#} | Opponent^{#} | Result | Record | Site (attendance) city, state |
Regular season
| Nov 26, 1992* | | vs. New Mexico State; Great Alaska Shootout | L 65–75 | 0–1 | Sullivan Arena; Anchorage, Alaska |
| Nov 27, 1992* | | at Alaska Anchorage; Great Alaska Shootout | W 110–56 | 1–1 | Sullivan Arena; Anchorage, Alaska |
| Nov 28, 1992* | | vs. UAB; Great Alaska Shootout | L 52–67 | 1–2 | Sullivan Arena; Anchorage, Alaska |
| Dec 3, 1992* | | Augusta State | W 109–87 | 2–2 | The McKenzie Arena; Chattanooga, Tennessee |
| Dec 8, 1992* | | USC Aiken | W 95–72 | 3–2 | The McKenzie Arena; Chattanooga, Tennessee |
| Dec 16, 1992* | | Sewanee | W 98–43 | 4–2 | The McKenzie Arena; Chattanooga, Tennessee |
| Dec 19, 1992* | | at Southern Miss | L 83–86 | 4–3 | Reed Green Coliseum; Hattiesburg, Mississippi |
| Dec 22, 1992* | | No. 16 Georgia Tech | L 74–81 | 4–4 | The McKenzie Arena; Chattanooga, Tennessee |
| Dec 29, 1992* | | Southern | W 114–102 | 5–4 | The McKenzie Arena; Chattanooga, Tennessee |
| Dec 30, 1992* | | Pepperdine | W 80–67 | 6–4 | The McKenzie Arena; Chattanooga, Tennessee |
| Jan 2, 1993* | | Bradley | W 75–55 | 7–4 | The McKenzie Arena; Chattanooga, Tennessee |
| Jan 6, 1993 | | Furman | W 71–61 | 8–4 (1–0) | The McKenzie Arena; Chattanooga, Tennessee |
| Jan 9, 1993 | | at Marshall | L 77–78 | 8–5 (1–1) | Cam Henderson Center; Huntington, West Virginia |
| Jan 10, 1993 | | at VMI | W 71–62 | 9–5 (2–1) | Cameron Hall; Lexington, Virginia |
| Jan 16, 1993 | | at Western Carolina | W 93–66 | 10–5 (3–1) | Ramsey Center; Cullowhee, North Carolina |
| Jan 20, 1993 | | Appalachian State | W 89–69 | 11–5 (4–1) | The McKenzie Arena; Chattanooga, Tennessee |
| Jan 23, 1993 | | at Georgia Southern | W 103–92 | 12–5 (5–1) | Hanner Fieldhouse; Statesboro, Georgia |
| Jan 24, 1993 | | at The Citadel | W 95–62 | 13–5 (6–1) | McAlister Field House; Charleston, South Carolina |
| Jan 27, 1993 | | East Tennessee State | W 87–77 | 14–5 (7–1) | The McKenzie Arena; Chattanooga, Tennessee |
| Jan 30, 1993 | | at Davidson | W 80–73 | 15–5 (8–1) | John M. Belk Arena; Davidson, North Carolina |
| Jan 31, 1993 | | at Furman | W 82–62 | 16–5 (9–1) | Greenville Memorial Auditorium; Greenville, South Carolina |
| Feb 6, 1993 | | at East Tennessee State | L 87–89 | 16–6 (9–2) | Memorial Center; Johnson City, Tennessee |
| Feb 7, 1993 | | at Appalachian State | W 87–85 | 17–6 (10–2) | Varsity Gymnasium; Boone, North Carolina |
| Feb 13, 1993 | | VMI | W 93–70 | 18–6 (11–2) | The McKenzie Arena; Chattanooga, Tennessee |
| Feb 14, 1993 | | Marshall | W 83–69 | 19–6 (12–2) | The McKenzie Arena; Chattanooga, Tennessee |
| Feb 17, 1993 | | Davidson | W 95–80 | 20–6 (13–2) | The McKenzie Arena; Chattanooga, Tennessee |
| Feb 20, 1993 | | Western Carolina | W 85–66 | 21–6 (14–2) | The McKenzie Arena; Chattanooga, Tennessee |
| Feb 27, 1993 | | The Citadel | W 95–72 | 22–6 (15–2) | The McKenzie Arena; Chattanooga, Tennessee |
| Feb 28, 1993 | | Georgia Southern | W 91–68 | 23–6 (16–2) | The McKenzie Arena; Chattanooga, Tennessee |
SoCon tournament
| Mar 5, 1993* | (1) | vs. (9) Furman; Quarterfinals | W 85–69 | 24–6 | Asheville Civic Center; Asheville, North Carolina |
| Mar 6, 1993* | (1) | vs. (5) Davidson; Semifinals | W 72–68 | 25–6 | Asheville Civic Center; Asheville, North Carolina |
| Mar 7, 1993* | (1) | vs. (2) East Tennessee State; Championship game | W 86–75 | 26–6 | Asheville Civic Center; Asheville, North Carolina |
NCAA tournament
| Mar 19, 1993* | (12 SE) | vs. (5 SE) No. 16 Wake Forest; First Round | L 58–81 | 26–7 | Memorial Gymnasium; Nashville, Tennessee |
*Non-conference game. ^{#}Rankings from AP poll. (#) Tournament seedings in parentheses. SE=Southeast. All times are in Eastern Time.
