= 1993 Southland Conference men's basketball tournament =

Basketball Tournament March 1992 in Texas

- Classification: Division I
- Season: 1992–93
- Teams: 6
- Site: Fant-Ewing Coliseum; Monroe, Louisiana
- Champions: Northeast Louisiana (5th title)
- Winning coach: Mike Vining (5th title)
- MVP: Ryan Stuart (Northeast Louisiana)

1992–93 Southland Conference men's basketball standings
| | Conf. | | | | Overall |
| Team | W | | L | PCT | W | | L | PCT |
|---|---|---|---|---|---|---|---|---|
| NE Louisiana † | 17 | – | 1 | .944 | 26 | – | 5 | .839 |
| Nicholls State | 11 | – | 7 | .611 | 14 | – | 12 | .538 |
| UT Arlington | 10 | – | 8 | .556 | 16 | – | 12 | .571 |
| UTSA | 10 | – | 8 | .556 | 15 | – | 14 | .517 |
| Texas State | 9 | – | 9 | .500 | 14 | – | 13 | .519 |
| McNeese State | 9 | – | 9 | .500 | 12 | – | 16 | .429 |
| Stephen F. Austin | 8 | – | 10 | .444 | 12 | – | 14 | .462 |
| Northwestern State | 7 | – | 11 | .389 | 13 | – | 13 | .500 |
| North Texas State | 5 | – | 13 | .278 | 5 | – | 21 | .192 |
| Sam Houston State | 4 | – | 14 | .222 | 6 | – | 19 | .240 |
† 1993 Southland Conference tournament winner Rankings from AP Poll

The 1993 Southland Conference men's basketball tournament was held March 5–7 at Fant-Ewing Coliseum in Monroe, Louisiana.

Northeast Louisiana defeated Texas–San Antonio in the championship game, 80–66, to win their fourth consecutive Southland men's basketball tournament.

The Indians received a bid to the 1993 NCAA Tournament as the No. 13 seed in the Southeast region.

== Format ==
Six of the ten conference members participated in the tournament field. They were seeded based on regular season conference records, with the top two seeds receiving a bye to the semifinal round. Tournament play began with the quarterfinal round.

== Bracket ==
Quarterfinals; March 5
4 | Texas–Arlington | 83
5 | Southwest Texas State | 79
3 | Texas–San Antonio | 77
6 | McNeese State | 68

Semifinals; March 6
1 | NE Louisiana | 106
5 | Texas–Arlington | 82
3 | Texas-San Antonio | 86
2 | Nicholls State | 67

Championship; March 7
1 | NE Louisiana | 80
3 | Texas-San Antonio | 66
