= 1992–93 Missouri Tigers men's basketball team =

American college basketball season

1992–93 Missouri Tigers men's basketball

Big Eight tournament champions

NCAA tournament, first round
- Conference: Big Eight Conference
- Record: 19–14 (5–9 Big 8)
- Head coach: Norm Stewart (26th season)
- Assistant coaches: Kim Anderson (2nd season); Rich Daly (10th season); Lee Winfield (1st season)
- Home arena: Hearnes Center

1992–93 Big Eight Conference men's basketball standings
| | Conf. | | | | Overall |
| Team | W | | L | PCT | W | | L | PCT |
|---|---|---|---|---|---|---|---|---|
| No. 9 Kansas | 11 | – | 3 | .786 | 29 | – | 7 | .806 |
| No. 23 Oklahoma State | 8 | – | 6 | .571 | 20 | – | 9 | .690 |
| Iowa State | 8 | – | 6 | .571 | 20 | – | 11 | .645 |
| Nebraska | 8 | – | 6 | .571 | 20 | – | 11 | .645 |
| Kansas State | 7 | – | 7 | .500 | 19 | – | 11 | .633 |
| Oklahoma | 7 | – | 7 | .500 | 20 | – | 12 | .625 |
| Missouri † | 5 | – | 9 | .357 | 19 | – | 14 | .576 |
| Colorado | 2 | – | 12 | .143 | 10 | – | 17 | .370 |
† 1993 Big Eight tournament winner As of April 5, 1993; Rankings from AP poll

The 1992–93 Missouri Tigers men's basketball team represented the University of Missouri as a member of the Big Eight Conference during the 1992–93 NCAA men's basketball season. Led by head coach Norm Stewart, the Tigers finished third in the Big Eight Conference, then unexpectedly won the Big Eight tournament to receive an automatic bid to the NCAA tournament as the No. 10 seed in the West region. Missouri fell to No. 7 seed Temple in the opening round. The Tigers finished with an overall record of 19–14 (5–9 Big Eight).

== Roster ==
1992–93 Missouri Tigers men's basketball team
Players
Coaches

| Pos. | # | Name | Height | Weight | Year | Hometown |
|---|---|---|---|---|---|---|
| F | 0 | Jevon Crudup | 6 ft 9 in (2.06 m) | 222 lb (101 kg) | Jr | Kansas City, Missouri |
| PG | 15 | Melvin Booker | 6 ft 2 in (1.88 m) | 185 lb (84 kg) | Jr | Moss Point, Mississippi |

Head coach

- Norm Stewart (Missouri)

Assistant coach(es)

Legend

- (C) Team captain
- (S) Suspended
- (I) Ineligible
- (W) Walk-on
- Injured
- Current redshirt

== Schedule and results ==
| Date time, TV | Rank^{#} | Opponent^{#} | Result | Record | Site (attendance) city, state |
Regular season
| Dec 19, 1992* | | No. 12 Arkansas | L 68–73 | 1–1 | Hearnes Center; Columbia, Missouri |
| Dec 23, 1992* | | vs. Illinois | W 66–65 | 2–1 | St. Louis Arena |
| Dec 28, 1992* | | vs. San Francisco | L 71–78 | 2–2 | |
| Dec 30, 1992* | | vs. Marist | W 69–56 | 3–2 | |
| Jan 3, 1993* | | UNC Asheville | W 99–56 | 4–2 | Hearnes Center; Columbia, Missouri |
| Jan 18, 1993* | | Coastal Carolina | W 94–69 | 11–3 | Hearnes Center; Columbia, Missouri |
Big Eight Conference tournament
| Mar 12, 1993* | | vs. No. 21 Oklahoma State; Quarterfinals | W 81–62 | 17–13 | Kemper Arena; Kansas City, Missouri |
| Mar 13, 1993* | | vs. Iowa State; Quarterfinals | W 67–63 | 18–13 | Kemper Arena; Kansas City, Missouri |
| Mar 14, 1993* | | vs. Kansas State; Championship game | W 68–56 | 19–13 | Kemper Arena; Kansas City, Missouri |
NCAA tournament
| Mar 18, 1993* | (10 W) | vs. (7 W) Temple; First Round | L 61–75 | 19–14 | Jon M. Huntsman Center; Salt Lake City, Utah |
*Non-conference game. ^{#}Rankings from AP. (#) Tournament seedings in parentheses. W=West. All times are in Central.
