= 1992–93 Northeast Louisiana Indians men's basketball team =

American college basketball season

1992–93 Northeast Louisiana Indians men's basketball

Southland Regular season champions Southland tournament champions

NCAA tournament
- Conference: Southland Conference
- Record: 26–5 (17–1 Southland)
- Head coach: Mike Vining (12th season)
- Home arena: Fant–Ewing Coliseum

1992–93 Southland Conference men's basketball standings
| | Conf. | | | | Overall |
| Team | W | | L | PCT | W | | L | PCT |
|---|---|---|---|---|---|---|---|---|
| NE Louisiana † | 17 | – | 1 | .944 | 26 | – | 5 | .839 |
| Nicholls State | 11 | – | 7 | .611 | 14 | – | 12 | .538 |
| UT Arlington | 10 | – | 8 | .556 | 16 | – | 12 | .571 |
| UTSA | 10 | – | 8 | .556 | 15 | – | 14 | .517 |
| Southwest Texas State | 9 | – | 9 | .500 | 14 | – | 13 | .519 |
| McNeese State | 9 | – | 9 | .500 | 12 | – | 16 | .429 |
| Stephen F. Austin | 8 | – | 10 | .444 | 12 | – | 14 | .462 |
| Northwestern State | 7 | – | 11 | .389 | 13 | – | 13 | .500 |
| North Texas State | 5 | – | 13 | .278 | 5 | – | 21 | .192 |
| Sam Houston State | 4 | – | 14 | .222 | 6 | – | 19 | .240 |
† 1993 Southland Conference tournament winner Rankings from AP Poll

The 1992–93 Northeast Louisiana Indians men's basketball team represented the Northeast Louisiana University in the 1992–93 NCAA Division I men's basketball season. The Indians, led by head coach Mike Vining, played their home games at Fant–Ewing Coliseum in Monroe, Louisiana, as members of the Southland Conference. They finished the season 26–5, 17–1 in Southland play to win the regular season league title. They followed the regular season by winning the Southland tournament to earn an automatic bid to the NCAA tournament as No. 13 seed in the Southeast region. Northeast Louisiana fell to No. 4 seed Iowa in the opening round, 82–69.

== Roster ==
1992–93 Northeast Louisiana Indians men's basketball team
| Players | Coaches |
|---|---|
| Pos. / # / Name / Height / Weight / Year / Hometown; F / 30 / Ryan Stuart / 6 ft 4 in (1.93 m) / — / Sr | Head coach: Mike Vining; Assistant coach(es) Legend: (C) Team captain; (S) Suspended; (I) Ineligible; (W) Walk-on; Injured; Current redshirt |

== Schedule and results ==
| Date time, TV | Rank^{#} | Opponent^{#} | Result | Record | Site (attendance) city, state |
Regular season
| Dec 18, 1992* | | vs. Coastal Carolina | L 68–77 | 2–2 | Neal S. Blaisdell Center; Honolulu, Hawaii |
| Dec 30, 1992* | | vs. No. 9 Arkansas | W 87–78 | 5–2 | Barton Coliseum (7,959); Little Rock, Arkansas |
Southland tournament
| Mar 6, 1993* | | Texas-Arlington; Semifinals | W 106–82 | 25–4 | Fant-Ewing Coliseum; Monroe, Louisiana |
| Mar 7, 1993* | | UTSA; Championship game | W 80–66 | 26–4 | Fant-Ewing Coliseum; Monroe, Louisiana |
NCAA Tournament
| Mar 19, 1993*; CBS | (13 SE) | vs. (4 SE) No. 13 Iowa; First Round | L 69–82 | 26–5 | Memorial Gymnasium; Nashville, Tennessee |
*Non-conference game. ^{#}Rankings from AP poll. (#) Tournament seedings in parentheses. SE=Southeast. All times are in Central.

== Awards and honors ==
- Ryan Stuart – Southland Player of the Year
