= 1993 Big Eight Conference men's basketball tournament =

- Classification: Division I
- Season: 1992–93
- Teams: 8
- Finals site: Kemper Arena; Kansas City, MO
- Champions: Missouri (6th title)
- Winning coach: Norm Stewart (6th title)
- MVP: Chris Heller (Missouri)

1992–93 Big Eight Conference men's basketball standings
	Conf.				Overall
Team	W		L	PCT	W		L	PCT
No. 9 Kansas	11	–	3	.786	29	–	7	.806
No. 23 Oklahoma State	8	–	6	.571	20	–	9	.690
Iowa State	8	–	6	.571	20	–	11	.645
Nebraska	8	–	6	.571	20	–	11	.645
Kansas State	7	–	7	.500	19	–	11	.633
Oklahoma	7	–	7	.500	20	–	12	.625
Missouri †	5	–	9	.357	19	–	14	.576
Colorado	2	–	12	.143	10	–	17	.370
† 1993 Big Eight tournament winner As of April 5, 1993; Rankings from AP poll

The 1993 Big Eight Conference men's basketball tournament was held March 12–14 at Kemper Arena in Kansas City, Missouri.

Seventh-seeded Missouri defeated #5 seed Kansas State in the championship game, 68–56, to earn the conference's automatic bid to the 1993 NCAA tournament.

== Bracket ==
Quarterfinals; Friday, March 12
1	#7 Kansas	82
8	Colorado	65
4	Nebraska	45
5	Kansas State	47
3	Iowa State	69
6	Oklahoma	56
7	Missouri	81
2	#21 Oklahoma State	62

Semifinals; Saturday, March 13
1	#7 Kansas	67
5	Kansas State	74
3	Iowa State	63
7	Missouri	67

Championship; Sunday, March 14
5	Kansas State	56
7	Missouri	68
