= 1992–93 NCAA Division I men's basketball season =

Basketball season

- Preseason AP No. 1: Michigan Wolverines
- NCAA Tournament: 1993
- Tournament dates: March 18 – April 5, 1993
- National Championship: Louisiana Superdome; New Orleans, Louisiana
- NCAA Champions: North Carolina Tar Heels
- Other champions: Minnesota Golden Gophers (NIT)
- Player of the Year (Naismith, Wooden): Calbert Cheaney, Indiana Hoosiers

The 1992–93 NCAA Division I men's basketball season began in November 1992 and ended with the Final Four at the Louisiana Superdome in New Orleans, Louisiana. The North Carolina Tar Heels earned their third national championship by defeating the Michigan Wolverines 77–71 on April 5, 1993.

== Season headlines ==
- With its membership reduced to three schools, the East Coast Conference lost its official conference status under NCAA bylaws, and its remaining members played as independents during the season. It regained official conference status the following season.
- The NCAA established a minimum seating capacity of 12,000 for facilities hosting first-round, second-round, regional semifinal, or regional final games of the NCAA tournament.
- Three No. 1 seeds in the NCAA tournament (Kentucky, Michigan, and North Carolina) advanced to the Final Four for the first time.
- Michigan's "Fab Five" played in the national championship game for the second straight season.
- North Carolina head coach Dean Smith won his second national championship and North Carolina's third overall.
- Doug Day of Radford completed his career (1989–1993) with 401 three-point field goals, the first player to make 400 or three-point pointers in his career.

== Season outlook ==
=== Pre-season polls ===
The top 25 from the AP Poll and Coaches Poll during the pre-season.

Associated Press
Ranking	Team
1	Michigan
2	Kansas
3	Duke
4	Indiana
5	Kentucky
6	Seton Hall
7	North Carolina
8	Memphis
9	Florida State
10	Arizona
11	Iowa
12	Georgetown
13	Louisville
14	Georgia Tech
15	Oklahoma
16	Connecticut
17	Tulane
18	Syracuse
19	Iowa State
20	Michigan State
21	Cincinnati
22	UNLV
23	UMass
24	UCLA
25	Nebraska

Coaches
Ranking	Team
1	Michigan
2	Duke
3	Indiana
4	Kansas
5	Kentucky
6	Seton Hall
7	North Carolina
8	Florida State
9	Memphis
10	Arizona
11	Georgetown
12	Louisville
13	Iowa
14	Tulane
15	Georgia Tech
16	Oklahoma
17	UCLA
18	Cincinnati
18	Texas
20	Connecticut
21	Michigan State
22	Nebraska
23	UNLV
24	Iowa State
25	New Mexico State

== Conference membership changes ==
These schools joined new conferences for the 1992–93 season.

School	Former conference	New conference
Akron Zips	Mid-Continent Conference	Mid-American Conference
Brooklyn Bulldogs	East Coast Conference	Discontinued athletic programs
Buffalo Bulls	East Coast Conference	NCAA Division I Independent
Central Connecticut State Blue Devils	East Coast Conference	NCAA Division I Independent
Central Florida (UCF) Knights	Sun Belt Conference	Trans America Athletic Conference
College of Charleston Cougars	NCAA Division I Independent	Trans America Athletic Conference
Davidson Wildcats	Big South Conference	Southern Conference
Duquesne Dukes	Atlantic 10 Conference	Midwestern Collegiate Conference
Fresno State Bulldogs	Big West Conference	Western Athletic Conference
Georgia Southern Eagles	Trans America Athletic Conference	Southern Conference
UNC Greensboro Spartans	NCAA Division I Independent	Big South Conference
Hofstra Flying Dutchmen	East Coast Conference	NCAA Division I Independent
La Salle Explorers	Metro Atlantic Athletic Conference	Midwestern Collegiate Conference
UMBC Retrievers	East Coast Conference	Big South Conference
Nevada Wolf Pack	Big Sky Conference	Big West Conference
Penn State Nittany Lions	NCAA Division I Independent	Big Ten Conference
Rider Broncs	East Coast Conference	Northeast Conference
Tennessee-Martin Skyhawks	Gulf South Conference (D-II)	Ohio Valley Conference
Towson State Tigers	East Coast Conference	Big South Conference
Youngstown State Penguins	NCAA Division I Independent	Mid-Continent Conference

== Regular season ==
=== Conferences ===
==== Conference winners and tournaments ====
Conference	Regular season first place	Conference player of the year	Conference Coach of the Year	Conference tournament	Tournament venue (city)	Tournament winner
Atlantic 10 Conference	UMass	Aaron McKie, Temple	John Calipari, UMass	1993 Atlantic 10 men's basketball tournament	The Palestra; Philadelphia, Pennsylvania; Mullins Center; Amherst, Massachusetts	UMass
Atlantic Coast Conference	North Carolina	Rodney Rogers, Wake Forest	Dean Smith, North Carolina	1993 ACC men's basketball tournament	Charlotte Coliseum; Charlotte, North Carolina	Georgia Tech
Big East Conference	Seton Hall	Terry Dehere, Seton Hall	Brian Mahoney, St. John's	1993 Big East men's basketball tournament	Madison Square Garden; New York, New York	Seton Hall
Big Eight Conference	Kansas	Bryant Reeves, Oklahoma State	Dana Altman, Kansas State	1993 Big Eight Conference men's basketball tournament	Kemper Arena; Kansas City, Missouri	Missouri
Big Sky Conference	Idaho	Orlando Lightfoot, Idaho	Bobby Dye, Boise State	1993 Big Sky Conference men's basketball tournament	Kibbie Dome; Moscow, Idaho	Boise State
Big South Conference	Towson State	Tony Dunkin, Coastal Carolina	Terry Truax, Towson State	1993 Big South Conference men's basketball tournament	North Charleston Coliseum; North Charleston, South Carolina	Coastal Carolina
Big Ten Conference	Indiana	Calbert Cheaney, Indiana	Lou Henson, Illinois	No Tournament		
Big West Conference	New Mexico State	Isaiah Rider, UNLV	Bob Thomason, Pacific	1993 Big West Conference men's basketball tournament	Long Beach Arena; Long Beach, California	Long Beach State
Colonial Athletic Association	James Madison & Old Dominion	Brian Gilgeous, American	Oliver Purnell, Old Dominion	1993 CAA men's basketball tournament	Richmond Coliseum; Richmond, Virginia	East Carolina
Great Midwest Conference	Cincinnati	Penny Hardaway, Memphis State		1993 Great Midwest Conference men's basketball tournament	The Pyramid; Memphis, Tennessee	Cincinnati
Ivy League	Penn	Buck Jenkins, Columbia, & Jerome Allen, Penn	Not named	No Tournament		
Metro Conference	Louisville	Clifford Rozier, Louisville	Sonny Smith, VCU	1993 Metro Conference men's basketball tournament	Freedom Hall; Louisville, Kentucky	Louisville
Metro Atlantic Athletic Conference	Manhattan	Keith Bullock, Manhattan	Jack Armstrong, Niagara	1993 MAAC men's basketball tournament	Knickerbocker Arena; Albany, New York	Manhattan
Mid-American Conference	Ball State & Miami (OH)	Gary Trent, Miami (OH)	Joby Wright, Miami (OH)	1993 MAC men's basketball tournament	Battelle Hall; Columbus, Ohio	Ball State
Mid-Continent Conference	Cleveland State	Bill Edwards, Wright State	Mike Boyd, Cleveland State	1993 Mid-Continent Conference men's basketball tournament	Nutter Center; Dayton, Ohio	Wright State
Mid-Eastern Athletic Conference	Coppin State	Jackie Robinson, South Carolina State	Ron Mitchell, Coppin State	1993 MEAC men's basketball tournament	Norfolk Scope; Norfolk, Virginia	Coppin State
Midwestern Collegiate Conference	Xavier	Brian Grant, Xavier	Pete Gillen, Xavier	1993 Midwestern Collegiate Conference men's basketball tournament	Market Square Arena; Indianapolis, Indiana	Evansville
Missouri Valley Conference	Illinois State	Curt Smith, Drake	Rudy Washington, Drake	1993 Missouri Valley Conference men's basketball tournament	St. Louis Arena; St. Louis, Missouri	Southern Illinois
North Atlantic Conference	Drexel & Northeastern	Vin Baker, Hartford	Bill Herrion, Drexel	1993 North Atlantic Conference men's basketball tournament	Daskalakis Athletic Center; Philadelphia, Pennsylvania	Delaware
Northeast Conference	Rider	Darrick Suber, Rider	Jim Phelan, Mount St. Mary's & Kevin Bannon, Rider	1993 Northeast Conference men's basketball tournament	Alumni Gymnasium; Lawrenceville, New Jersey	Rider
Ohio Valley Conference	Tennessee State	Carlos Rogers, Tennessee State	Frankie Allen, Tennessee State	1993 Ohio Valley Conference men's basketball tournament	Rupp Arena; Lexington, Kentucky	Tennessee State
Pacific-10 Conference	Arizona	Chris Mills, Arizona	Lute Olson, Arizona	No Tournament		
Patriot League	Bucknell	Mike Bright, Bucknell	Charlie Woollum, Bucknell	1993 Patriot League men's basketball tournament	Davis Gym; Lewisburg, Pennsylvania	Holy Cross
Southeastern Conference	Vanderbilt (East); Arkansas (West)	Jamal Mashburn, Kentucky, & Bill McCaffrey, Vanderbilt	Eddie Fogler, Vanderbilt	1993 SEC men's basketball tournament	Rupp Arena; Lexington, Kentucky	Kentucky
Southern Conference	Chattanooga	Tim Brooks, Chattanooga	Mack McCarthy, Chattanooga	1993 Southern Conference men's basketball tournament	Asheville Civic Center; Asheville, North Carolina	Chattanooga
Southland Conference	Northeast Louisiana	Ryan Stuart, Northeast Louisiana	Mike Vining, Northeast Louisiana	1993 Southland Conference men's basketball tournament	Fant-Ewing Coliseum; Monroe, Louisiana	Northeast Louisiana
Southwest Conference	SMU	Mike Wilson, SMU	John Shumate, SMU	1993 Southwest Conference men's basketball tournament	Reunion Arena; Dallas, Texas	Texas Tech
Southwestern Athletic Conference	Jackson State	Lindsey Hunter, Jackson State	Andy Stoglin, Jackson State	1993 SWAC men's basketball tournament	Riverside Centroplex; Baton Rouge, Louisiana	Southern
Sun Belt Conference	New Orleans	Ervin Johnson, New Orleans	Tim Floyd, New Orleans	1993 Sun Belt Conference men's basketball tournament	Mississippi Coast Coliseum; Biloxi, Mississippi	Western Kentucky
Trans America Athletic Conference	Florida International	Kenny Brown, Mercer	Bob Weltlich, Florida International	No Tournament		
West Coast Athletic Conference	Pepperdine	Dana Jones, Pepperdine	Dick Davey, Santa Clara	1993 West Coast Conference men's basketball tournament	War Memorial Gymnasium; San Francisco, California	Santa Clara
Western Athletic Conference	BYU & Utah	Josh Grant, Utah	Rick Majerus, Utah	1993 WAC men's basketball tournament	Delta Center; Salt Lake City, Utah	New Mexico

==== Conference standings ====
1992–93 ACC men's basketball standings
	Conf.				Overall
Team	W		L	PCT	W		L	PCT
No. 4 North Carolina	14	–	2	.875	34	–	4	.895
No. 11 Florida State	12	–	4	.750	25	–	10	.714
No. 10 Duke	10	–	6	.625	24	–	8	.750
No. 16 Wake Forest	10	–	6	.625	21	–	9	.700
Virginia	9	–	7	.563	21	–	10	.677
No. 18 Georgia Tech †	8	–	8	.500	19	–	11	.633
Clemson	5	–	11	.313	17	–	13	.567
Maryland	2	–	14	.125	12	–	16	.429
NC State	2	–	14	.125	8	–	19	.296
† 1993 ACC tournament winner Rankings from AP poll

1992–93 Atlantic 10 men's basketball standings
	Conf.				Overall
Team	W		L	PCT	W		L	PCT
No. 14 UMass †	11	–	3	.786	24	–	7	.774
George Washington	8	–	6	.571	21	–	9	.700
Rhode Island	8	–	6	.571	19	–	11	.633
Saint Joseph's	8	–	6	.571	18	–	11	.621
Temple	8	–	6	.571	20	–	13	.606
West Virginia	7	–	7	.500	17	–	12	.586
Rutgers	6	–	8	.429	13	–	15	.464
St. Bonaventure	0	–	14	.000	10	–	17	.370
† 1993 Atlantic 10 Tournament winner Rankings from AP Poll

1992–93 Big East men's basketball standings
	Conf.				Overall
Team	W		L	PCT	W		L	PCT
No. 6 Seton Hall †	14	–	4	.778	28	–	7	.800
St. John's	12	–	6	.667	19	–	11	.633
Syracuse	10	–	8	.556	20	–	9	.690
Connecticut	9	–	9	.500	15	–	13	.536
Providence	9	–	9	.500	20	–	13	.606
Pittsburgh	9	–	9	.500	17	–	11	.607
Boston College	9	–	9	.500	18	–	13	.581
Georgetown	8	–	10	.444	20	–	13	.606
Miami	7	–	11	.389	10	–	17	.370
Villanova	3	–	15	.167	8	–	19	.296
† 1993 Big East tournament winner As of April 5, 1993; Rankings from AP Poll

1992–93 Big Eight Conference men's basketball standings
	Conf.				Overall
Team	W		L	PCT	W		L	PCT
No. 9 Kansas	11	–	3	.786	29	–	7	.806
No. 23 Oklahoma State	8	–	6	.571	20	–	9	.690
Iowa State	8	–	6	.571	20	–	11	.645
Nebraska	8	–	6	.571	20	–	11	.645
Kansas State	7	–	7	.500	19	–	11	.633
Oklahoma	7	–	7	.500	20	–	12	.625
Missouri †	5	–	9	.357	19	–	14	.576
Colorado	2	–	12	.143	10	–	17	.370
† 1993 Big Eight tournament winner As of April 5, 1993; Rankings from AP poll

1992–93 Big Sky men's basketball standings
	Conf.				Overall
Team	W		L	PCT	W		L	PCT
Idaho	11	–	3	.786	24	–	8	.750
Boise State †	10	–	4	.714	21	–	8	.724
Weber State	10	–	4	.714	20	–	8	.714
Montana	8	–	6	.571	17	–	11	.607
Idaho State	5	–	9	.357	10	–	18	.357
Montana State	5	–	9	.357	9	–	18	.333
Northern Arizona	4	–	10	.286	10	–	16	.385
Eastern Washington	3	–	11	.214	6	–	20	.231
† Conference tournament winner

1992–93 Big South Conference men's basketball standings
	Conf.				Overall
Team	W		L	PCT	W		L	PCT
Towson State	14	–	2	.875	18	–	9	.667
Coastal Carolina †	12	–	4	.750	22	–	10	.688
Campbell	10	–	6	.625	12	–	15	.444
Liberty	9	–	7	.563	16	–	14	.533
Radford	8	–	8	.500	16	–	15	.516
UMBC	7	–	9	.438	12	–	16	.429
Charleston Southern	5	–	11	.313	9	–	18	.333
Winthrop	5	–	11	.313	14	–	16	.467
UNC Asheville	2	–	14	.125	4	–	23	.148
† 1993 Big South tournament winner Rankings from AP Poll

1992–93 Big Ten Conference men's basketball standings
	Conf.				Overall
Team	W		L	PCT	W		L	PCT
No. 1 Indiana	17	–	1	.944	31	–	4	.886
No. 13 Iowa	11	–	7	.611	23	–	9	.719
Illinois	11	–	7	.611	19	–	13	.594
Minnesota	9	–	9	.500	22	–	10	.688
No. 22 Purdue	9	–	9	.500	18	–	10	.643
Ohio State	8	–	10	.444	15	–	13	.536
Michigan State	7	–	11	.389	15	–	13	.536
Wisconsin	7	–	11	.389	14	–	14	.500
Northwestern	3	–	15	.167	8	–	19	.296
Penn State	2	–	16	.111	7	–	20	.259
No. 3 Michigan	0	–	3	.000	0	–	4	.000
Rankings from AP Poll; *Michigan vacated all games due to NCAA sanctions. Disputed record (15-3, 31-5)

1992–93 Big West men's basketball standings
	Conf.				Overall
Team	W		L	PCT	W		L	PCT
No. 24 New Mexico State	15	–	3	.833	26	–	8	.765
No. 25 UNLV	13	–	5	.722	21	–	8	.724
Pacific	12	–	6	.667	16	–	11	.593
Long Beach State †	11	–	7	.611	22	–	10	.688
UC Santa Barbara	10	–	8	.556	18	–	11	.621
Cal State Fullerton	10	–	8	.556	15	–	12	.556
Utah State	7	–	11	.389	10	–	17	.370
Nevada	4	–	14	.222	9	–	17	.346
San Jose State	4	–	14	.222	7	–	19	.269
UC Irvine	4	–	14	.222	6	–	21	.222
† 1993 Big West tournament winner Rankings from AP Poll

1992–93 CAA men's basketball standings
	Conf.				Overall
Team	W		L	PCT	W		L	PCT
James Madison	11	–	3	.786	21	–	9	.700
Old Dominion	11	–	3	.786	21	–	8	.724
Richmond	10	–	4	.714	15	–	12	.556
American	6	–	8	.429	11	–	17	.393
William & Mary	6	–	8	.429	14	–	13	.519
UNC Wilmington	6	–	8	.429	17	–	11	.607
East Carolina †	4	–	10	.286	13	–	17	.433
George Mason	2	–	12	.143	7	–	21	.250
† 1993 CAA tournament winner Rankings from AP Poll

1992–93 Great Midwest Conference men's basketball standings
	Conf.				Overall
Team	W		L	PCT	W		L	PCT
No. 7 Cincinnati †	8	–	2	.800	27	–	5	.844
Memphis State	7	–	3	.700	20	–	12	.625
Marquette	6	–	4	.600	20	–	8	.714
UAB	5	–	5	.500	21	–	14	.600
DePaul	3	–	7	.300	16	–	15	.516
Saint Louis	1	–	9	.100	12	–	17	.414
† 1993 GMC tournament winner Rankings from AP Poll

1992–93 Ivy League men's basketball standings
	Conf.				Overall
Team	W		L	PCT	W		L	PCT
Penn	14	–	0	1.000	22	–	5	.815
Columbia	10	–	4	.714	16	–	10	.615
Cornell	9	–	5	.643	16	–	10	.615
Princeton	7	–	7	.500	15	–	11	.577
Yale	6	–	8	.429	10	–	16	.385
Dartmouth	5	–	9	.357	11	–	15	.423
Harvard	3	–	11	.214	6	–	20	.231
Brown	2	–	12	.143	7	–	19	.269
Rankings from AP Poll

1992–93 Metro Conference men's basketball standings
	Conf.				Overall
Team	W		L	PCT	W		L	PCT
No. 15 Louisville †	11	–	1	.917	22	–	9	.710
Tulane	9	–	3	.750	22	–	9	.710
VCU	7	–	5	.583	20	–	10	.667
UNC Charlotte	6	–	6	.500	15	–	13	.536
Southern Miss	6	–	6	.500	10	–	17	.370
South Florida	2	–	10	.167	8	–	19	.296
Virginia Tech	1	–	11	.083	10	–	18	.357
† 1993 Metro Conference tournament winner Rankings from AP Poll

1992–93 MAAC men's basketball standings
	Conf.				Overall
Team	W		L	PCT	W		L	PCT
Manhattan †	12	–	2	.857	23	–	7	.767
Niagara	11	–	3	.786	23	–	7	.767
Iona	9	–	5	.643	16	–	11	.593
Siena	8	–	6	.571	16	–	13	.552
Fairfield	7	–	7	.500	14	–	13	.519
Canisius	5	–	9	.357	10	–	18	.357
Saint Peter's	3	–	11	.214	9	–	18	.333
Loyola (MD)	1	–	13	.071	2	–	25	.074
† 1993 MAAC tournament winner Rankings from AP Poll

1992–93 Mid-American Conference men's basketball standings
	Conf.				Overall
Team	W		L	PCT	W		L	PCT
Ball State †	14	–	4	.778	26	–	8	.765
Miami (OH)	14	–	4	.778	22	–	9	.710
Western Michigan	12	–	6	.667	17	–	12	.586
Ohio	11	–	7	.611	14	–	13	.519
Toledo	9	–	9	.500	12	–	16	.429
Eastern Michigan	8	–	10	.444	13	–	17	.433
Bowling Green	8	–	10	.444	11	–	16	.407
Kent State	7	–	11	.389	10	–	17	.370
Central Michigan	4	–	14	.222	8	–	18	.308
Akron	3	–	15	.167	8	–	18	.308
† 1993 MAC tournament winner Rankings from AP Poll

1992–93 Mid-Continent Conference men's basketball standings
	Conf.				Overall
Team	W		L	PCT	W		L	PCT
Cleveland State	15	–	1	.938	22	–	6	.786
Northern Illinois	10	–	6	.625	15	–	12	.556
Wright State †	10	–	6	.625	20	–	10	.667
Illinois–Chicago	9	–	7	.563	17	–	15	.531
Wisconsin–Green Bay	9	–	7	.563	13	–	14	.481
Eastern Illinois	7	–	9	.438	10	–	17	.370
Valparaiso	7	–	9	.438	12	–	16	.429
Western Illinois	4	–	12	.250	7	–	20	.259
Youngstown State	1	–	15	.063	3	–	23	.115
† 1993 Mid-Con Tournament winner Rankings from AP Poll

1992–93 MEAC men's basketball standings
	Conf.				Overall
Team	W		L	PCT	W		L	PCT
Coppin State †	16	–	0	1.000	22	–	8	.733
South Carolina State	9	–	7	.563	16	–	13	.552
North Carolina A&T	9	–	7	.563	14	–	13	.519
Morgan State	9	–	7	.563	9	–	17	.346
Florida A&M	8	–	8	.500	10	–	18	.357
Maryland Eastern Shore	7	–	9	.438	13	–	14	.481
Delaware State	6	–	10	.375	13	–	16	.448
Howard	6	–	10	.375	10	–	18	.357
Bethune–Cookman	2	–	14	.125	3	–	24	.111
† 1993 MEAC tournament winner Rankings from AP Poll

1992–93 Midwestern Collegiate Conference men's basketball standings
	Conf.				Overall
Team	W		L	PCT	W		L	PCT
Xavier	12	–	2	.857	24	–	6	.800
Evansville †	12	–	2	.857	23	–	7	.767
La Salle	9	–	5	.643	14	–	13	.519
Detroit Mercy	7	–	7	.500	15	–	12	.556
Duquesne	5	–	9	.357	13	–	15	.464
Butler	5	–	9	.357	11	–	17	.393
Dayton	3	–	11	.214	4	–	26	.133
Loyola (IL)	3	–	11	.214	7	–	20	.259
† 1993 MCC tournament winner

1992–93 Missouri Valley Conference men's basketball standings
	Conf.				Overall
Team	W		L	PCT	W		L	PCT
Illinois State	13	–	5	.722	19	–	10	.655
Southern Illinois †	12	–	6	.667	23	–	10	.697
Southwest Missouri State	11	–	7	.611	20	–	11	.645
Tulsa	10	–	8	.556	15	–	14	.517
Drake	9	–	9	.500	14	–	14	.500
Northern Iowa	8	–	10	.444	12	–	15	.444
Wichita State	7	–	11	.389	10	–	17	.370
Bradley	7	–	11	.389	11	–	16	.407
Indiana State	7	–	11	.389	11	–	17	.393
Creighton	6	–	12	.333	8	–	18	.308
† 1993 MVC tournament winner Rankings from AP Poll

1992–93 North Atlantic Conference men's basketball standings
	Conf.				Overall
Team	W		L	PCT	W		L	PCT
Drexel	12	–	2	.857	22	–	7	.759
Northeastern	12	–	2	.857	20	–	8	.714
Delaware †	10	–	4	.714	22	–	8	.733
Hartford	7	–	7	.500	14	–	14	.500
Maine	4	–	10	.286	10	–	17	.370
New Hampshire	4	–	10	.286	6	–	21	.222
Vermont	4	–	10	.286	10	–	17	.370
Boston University	3	–	11	.214	6	–	21	.222
† 1993 NAC tournament winner Rankings from AP poll

1992–93 Northeast Conference men's basketball standings
	Conf.				Overall
Team	W		L	PCT	W		L	PCT
Rider †	14	–	4	.778	19	–	11	.633
Wagner	12	–	6	.667	18	–	12	.600
Mount St. Mary's	10	–	8	.556	14	–	16	.467
Marist	10	–	8	.556	14	–	16	.467
Fairleigh Dickinson	8	–	10	.444	11	–	17	.393
St. Francis Brooklyn	8	–	10	.444	9	–	18	.333
Saint Francis (PA)	7	–	11	.389	9	–	18	.333
Robert Morris	7	–	11	.389	9	–	18	.333
Long Island	7	–	11	.389	9	–	18	.333
Monmouth	7	–	11	.389	11	–	17	.393
† 1993 NEC tournament winner

1992–93 Ohio Valley Conference men's basketball standings
	Conf.				Overall
Team	W		L	PCT	W		L	PCT
Tennessee State †	13	–	3	.813	19	–	10	.655
Eastern Kentucky	11	–	5	.688	15	–	12	.556
Murray State	11	–	5	.688	18	–	12	.600
Tennessee Tech	9	–	7	.563	15	–	13	.536
Southeast Missouri State	9	–	7	.563	16	–	11	.593
Morehead State	6	–	10	.375	6	–	21	.222
Middle Tennessee	5	–	11	.313	10	–	16	.385
Austin Peay	4	–	12	.250	7	–	20	.259
UT Martin	4	–	12	.250	7	–	19	.269
† 1993 OVC tournament winner Rankings from AP Poll

1992–93 Pacific-10 Conference men's basketball standings
	Conf.				Overall
Team	W		L	PCT	W		L	PCT
No. 5 Arizona	17	–	1	.944	24	–	4	.857
California	12	–	6	.667	21	–	9	.700
UCLA	11	–	7	.611	22	–	11	.667
Arizona State	11	–	7	.611	18	–	10	.643
USC	9	–	9	.500	18	–	12	.600
Oregon State	9	–	9	.500	13	–	14	.481
Washington	7	–	11	.389	13	–	14	.481
Washington State	9	–	9	.500	15	–	12	.556
Oregon	3	–	15	.167	10	–	20	.333
Stanford	2	–	16	.111	7	–	23	.233
Rankings from AP Poll

1992–93 Patriot League men's basketball standings
	Conf.				Overall
Team	W		L	PCT	W		L	PCT
Bucknell	13	–	1	.929	23	–	6	.793
Holy Cross †	12	–	2	.857	23	–	7	.767
Fordham	9	–	5	.643	15	–	16	.484
Colgate	9	–	5	.643	18	–	10	.643
Navy	5	–	9	.357	8	–	19	.296
Lafayette	4	–	10	.286	7	–	20	.259
Army	2	–	12	.143	4	–	22	.154
Lehigh	2	–	12	.143	4	–	23	.148
† 1993 Patriot League tournament winner

1992–93 Southeastern Conference men's basketball standings
	Conf.				Overall
Team	W		L	PCT	W		L	PCT
East
No. 8 Vanderbilt	14	–	2	.875	28	–	6	.824
No. 2 Kentucky †	13	–	3	.813	30	–	4	.882
Florida	9	–	7	.563	16	–	12	.571
Georgia	8	–	8	.500	15	–	14	.517
South Carolina	5	–	11	.313	9	–	18	.333
Tennessee	4	–	12	.250	13	–	17	.433
West
No. 12 Arkansas	10	–	6	.625	22	–	9	.710
LSU	9	–	7	.563	22	–	11	.667
Auburn	8	–	8	.500	15	–	12	.556
Alabama	7	–	9	.438	16	–	13	.552
Mississippi State	5	–	11	.313	13	–	16	.448
Ole Miss	4	–	12	.250	10	–	18	.357
† 1993 SEC tournament winner Rankings from AP poll

1992–93 Southern Conference men's basketball standings
	Conf.				Overall
Team	W		L	PCT	W		L	PCT
Chattanooga †	16	–	2	.889	26	–	7	.788
East Tennessee State	12	–	6	.667	19	–	10	.655
Georgia Southern	12	–	6	.667	19	–	9	.679
Marshall	11	–	7	.611	16	–	11	.593
Davidson	10	–	8	.556	14	–	14	.500
The Citadel	8	–	10	.444	10	–	17	.370
Appalachian State	8	–	10	.444	13	–	15	.464
Furman	8	–	10	.444	11	–	17	.393
VMI	3	–	15	.167	5	–	22	.185
Western Carolina	2	–	16	.111	6	–	21	.222
† 1993 SoCon Tournament winner As of April 30, 1993; Rankings from AP poll

1992–93 Southland Conference men's basketball standings
	Conf.				Overall
Team	W		L	PCT	W		L	PCT
NE Louisiana †	17	–	1	.944	26	–	5	.839
Nicholls State	11	–	7	.611	14	–	12	.538
UT Arlington	10	–	8	.556	16	–	12	.571
UTSA	10	–	8	.556	15	–	14	.517
Southwest Texas State	9	–	9	.500	14	–	13	.519
McNeese State	9	–	9	.500	12	–	16	.429
Stephen F. Austin	8	–	10	.444	12	–	14	.462
Northwestern State	7	–	11	.389	13	–	13	.500
North Texas State	5	–	13	.278	5	–	21	.192
Sam Houston State	4	–	14	.222	6	–	19	.240
† 1993 Southland Conference tournament winner Rankings from AP Poll

1992–93 Southwest Conference men's basketball standings
	Conf.				Overall
Team	W		L	PCT	W		L	PCT
SMU	12	–	2	.857	20	–	8	.714
Rice	11	–	3	.786	18	–	10	.643
Houston	9	–	5	.643	21	–	9	.700
Baylor	7	–	7	.500	16	–	11	.593
Texas Tech †	6	–	8	.429	18	–	12	.600
Texas A&M	5	–	9	.357	10	–	17	.370
Texas	4	–	10	.286	11	–	17	.393
TCU	2	–	12	.143	6	–	22	.214
† 1993 SWC tournament winner Rankings from AP Poll

1992–93 SWAC men's basketball standings
	Conf.				Overall
Team	W		L	PCT	W		L	PCT
Jackson State	13	–	1	.929	25	–	9	.735
Southern †	9	–	5	.643	21	–	10	.677
Alabama State	9	–	5	.643	14	–	13	.519
Texas Southern	8	–	6	.571	12	–	15	.444
Mississippi Valley State	7	–	7	.500	13	–	15	.464
Grambling State	5	–	9	.357	13	–	14	.481
Alcorn State	5	–	9	.357	7	–	20	.259
Prairie View A&M	0	–	14	.000	1	–	26	.037
† 1993 SWAC tournament winner Rankings from AP Poll

1992–93 Sun Belt Conference men's basketball standings
	Conf.				Overall
Team	W		L	PCT	W		L	PCT
No. 17 New Orleans	18	–	0	1.000	26	–	4	.867
No. 20 Western Kentucky †	14	–	4	.778	26	–	6	.813
SW Louisiana	11	–	7	.611	17	–	13	.567
Arkansas State	11	–	7	.611	16	–	12	.571
Arkansas-Little Rock	10	–	8	.556	15	–	12	.556
South Alabama	9	–	9	.500	15	–	13	.536
Lamar	9	–	9	.500	15	–	12	.556
Jacksonville	3	–	15	.167	5	–	22	.185
Louisiana Tech	3	–	15	.167	7	–	21	.250
Texas-Rio Grande Valley	2	–	16	.111	2	–	20	.091
† 1993 Sun Belt Conference tournament winner Rankings from AP Poll

1992–93 Trans America Athletic Conference men's basketball standings
	Conf.				Overall
Team	W		L	PCT	W		L	PCT
Florida International	9	–	3	.750	20	–	10	.667
Samford	7	–	5	.583	17	–	10	.630
Mercer	7	–	5	.583	13	–	14	.481
Stetson	6	–	6	.500	13	–	14	.481
Georgia State	5	–	7	.417	13	–	14	.481
Southeastern Louisiana	4	–	8	.333	12	–	15	.444
Centenary (LA)	4	–	8	.333	9	–	18	.333
College of Charleston	0	–	0	–	19	–	8	.704
UCF	0	–	0	–	10	–	17	.370
Rankings from AP Poll

1992–93 West Coast Conference men's basketball standings
	Conf.				Overall
Team	W		L	PCT	W		L	PCT
Pepperdine	11	–	3	.786	23	–	8	.742
Gonzaga	10	–	4	.714	19	–	9	.679
Santa Clara †	9	–	5	.643	19	–	12	.613
San Francisco	8	–	6	.571	19	–	12	.613
San Diego	7	–	7	.500	13	–	14	.481
Saint Mary's (CA)	6	–	8	.429	11	–	16	.407
Portland	3	–	11	.214	9	–	18	.333
Loyola Marymount	2	–	12	.143	7	–	20	.259
† Conference tournament winner Rankings from AP poll

1992–93 WAC men's basketball standings
	Conf.				Overall
Team	W		L	PCT	W		L	PCT
No. 19 Utah	15	–	3	.833	24	–	7	.774
BYU	15	–	3	.833	25	–	9	.735
No. 21 New Mexico †	13	–	5	.722	24	–	7	.774
UTEP	10	–	8	.556	21	–	13	.618
Colorado State	9	–	9	.500	17	–	12	.586
Fresno State	8	–	10	.444	13	–	15	.464
Hawaii	7	–	11	.389	12	–	16	.429
Wyoming	7	–	11	.389	13	–	15	.464
San Diego State	3	–	15	.167	8	–	21	.276
Air Force	3	–	15	.167	9	–	19	.321
† 1993 WAC tournament winner Rankings from AP Poll

=== Division I independents ===
Eleven college teams played as Division I independents. Among them, UW–Milwaukee (23–4) had both the best winning percentage (.852) and the most wins.

1992–93 NCAA Division I men's basketball independents standings
	Conf.				Overall
Team	W		L	PCT	W		L	PCT
UW-Milwaukee	-	–	-	–	23	–	4	.852
UMKC	-	–	-	–	15	–	12	.556
Southern Utah	-	–	-	–	14	–	13	.519
Northeastern Illinois	-	–	-	–	11	–	16	.407
Cal State Northridge	-	–	-	–	10	–	17	.370
Hofstra	-	–	-	–	9	–	18	.333
Notre Dame	-	–	-	–	9	–	18	.333
Central Connecticut State	-	–	-	–	8	–	19	.296
Buffalo	-	–	-	–	5	–	22	.185
Chicago State	-	–	-	–	4	–	23	.148
Sacramento State	-	–	-	–	3	–	24	.111
Rankings from AP Poll

=== Informal championships ===
Conference	Regular season winner	Most Valuable Player
Philadelphia Big 5	Temple	Aaron McKie, Temple

For the second consecutive season, the Philadelphia Big 5 did not play a full round-robin schedule in which each team met each other team once, a format it had used from its first season of competition in 1955–56 through the 1990–91 season. Instead, each team played only two games against other Big 5 members, and Temple finished with a 2–0 record in head-to-head competition among the Big 5. The Big 5 did not revive its full round-robin schedule until the 1999–2000 season.

=== Statistical leaders ===
Source for additional stats categories

Points per game			Rebounds per game			Assists per game			Blocked shots per game		
Player	School	PPG	Player	School	RPG	Player	School	APG	Player	School	BPG
Greg Guy	TX–Pan American	29.3	Warren Kidd	Middle Tennessee St.	14.8	Sam Crawford	New Mexico St.	9.1	Theo Ratliff	Wyoming	4.4
Isaiah Rider	UNLV	29.1	Jervaughn Scales	Southern	12.7	Dedan Thomas	UNLV	8.6	Sharone Wright	Clemson	4.1
John Best	Tennessee Tech	28.5	Reggie Jackson	Nicholls St.	12.5	Mark Woods	Wright St.	8.4	Bo Outlaw	Houston	3.8
Vin Baker	Hartford	28.3	Spencer Dunkley	Delaware	12.2	Bobby Hurley	Duke	8.2	Carlos Rogers	Tennessee St.	3.2
Lindsey Hunter	Jackson St.	26.7	Dan Callahan	Northeastern	12.1	Chuck Evans	Mississippi St.	8.1	Spencer Dunkley	Delaware	3.2
									Theron Wilson	E. Michigan	3.2

Steals per game			Field goal percentage			Three-point FG percentage			Free throw percentage		
Player	School	BPG	Player	School	FG%	Player	School	3FG%	Player	School	FT%
Jason Kidd	Cal Berkeley	3.8	Bo Outlaw	Houston	.658	Roosevelt Moore	Sam Houston	.533	Josh Grant	Utah	.920
Jay Goodman	Utah State	3.8	Brian Grant	Xavier	.654	Travis Ford	Kentucky	.529	Roger Breslin	Holy Cross	.901
Mark Woods	Wright State	3.6	Harry Hart	Iona	.654	Casey Schmidt	Valparaiso	.477	Jeremy Lake	Montana	.899
Mike Bright	Bucknell	3.2	Cherokee Parks	Duke	.652	Demetrius Dudley	Hofstra	.474	Casey Schmidt	Valparaiso	.897
Darnell Mee	Western Kentucky	3.1	Gary Trent	Ohio	.651	Keith Adkins	UNC Wilmington	.467	Scott Hartzell	UNC Greensboro	.889

== Postseason tournaments ==
=== NCAA Tournament ===
==== Final Four - Louisiana Superdome, New Orleans, Louisiana ====
National semifinals
E1	North Carolina	78
M2	Kansas	68
SE1	Kentucky	78
W1	Michigan *	81 *

National championship game
E1	North Carolina	77
W1	Michigan *	71

* Michigan's entire 1992–93 schedule results were vacated, on November 7, 2002, as part of the settlement of the University of Michigan basketball scandal. Unlike forfeiture, a vacated game does not result in the other school being credited with a win, only with Michigan removing the wins from its own record.

=== National Invitation Tournament ===
==== NIT Semifinals and Final ====
Semifinals
Providence	70
Minnesota	76
UAB	41
Georgetown	45

Finals
Minnesota	62
Georgetown	61

Third place game
UAB	55
Providence	52

== Award winners ==
=== Consensus All-American teams ===
Consensus First Team
Player	Position	Class	Team
Calbert Cheaney	F	Senior	Indiana
Penny Hardaway	G	Junior	Memphis State
Bobby Hurley	G	Senior	Duke
Jamal Mashburn	F	Junior	Kentucky
Chris Webber	F/C	Sophomore	Michigan

Consensus Second Team
Player	Position	Class	Team
Terry Dehere	G	Senior	Seton Hall
Grant Hill	F	Junior	Duke
Billy McCaffrey	G	Junior	Vanderbilt
Eric Montross	C	Junior	North Carolina
J. R. Rider	G	Senior	UNLV
Glenn Robinson	F	Sophomore	Purdue
Rodney Rogers	F	Junior	Wake Forest

=== Major player of the year awards ===
- Wooden Award: Calbert Cheaney, Indiana
- Naismith Award: Calbert Cheaney, Indiana
- Associated Press Player of the Year: Calbert Cheaney, Indiana
- UPI Player of the Year: Calbert Cheaney, Indiana
- NABC Player of the Year: Calbert Cheaney, Indiana
- Oscar Robertson Trophy (USBWA): Calbert Cheaney, Indiana
- Adolph Rupp Trophy: Calbert Cheaney, Indiana
- Sporting News Player of the Year: Calbert Cheaney, Indiana

=== Major freshman of the year awards ===
- USBWA National Freshman of the Year: Jason Kidd, California

=== Major coach of the year awards ===
- Associated Press Coach of the Year: Eddie Fogler, Vanderbilt
- UPI Coach of the Year: Eddie Fogler, Vanderbilt
- Henry Iba Award (USBWA): Eddie Fogler, Vanderbilt
- NABC Coach of the Year: Eddie Fogler, Vanderbilt
- Naismith College Coach of the Year: Dean Smith, North Carolina
- CBS/Chevrolet Coach of the Year: Eddie Fogler, Vanderbilt
- Sporting News Coach of the Year: Eddie Fogler, Vanderbilt

=== Other major awards ===
- Frances Pomeroy Naismith Award (Best player under 6'0): Sam Crawford, New Mexico State
- Robert V. Geasey Trophy (Top player in Philadelphia Big 5): Aaron McKie, Temple
- NIT/Haggerty Award (Top player in New York City metro area): Terry Dehere, Seton Hall

== Coaching changes ==
A number of teams changed coaches during the season and after it ended.

Team	Former Coach	Interim Coach	New Coach	Reason
Alcorn State	Lonnie Walker		Sam Weaver	
Army	Tom Miller	Mike Connors	Dino Gaudio	Miller was fired after going 13–61 with the Black Knights. Gaudio was hired from the Xavier coaching staff.
Ball State	Dick Hunsaker		Ray McCallum	Hunsaker left in midst of NCAA investigation. McCallum was hired from Michigan's coaching staff to coach his alma mater.
Bethune–Cookman	Cy McClairen		Tony Sheals	
Buffalo	Daniel Bazzani		Tim Cohane	
California	Lou Campanelli	Todd Bozeman		Campanelli was fired February 8, 1993 after berating his team after a loss. Bozeman finished the last ten regular season games going 9–1. Cal would make it to the Sweet 16 and earn Bozeman the full time head coach job.
Central Michigan	Keith Dambrot		Leonard Drake	Dambrot was fired for making a controversial comment before a game. Drake was an associate head coach with Ball State.
Cornell	Jan van Breda Kolff		Al Walker	van Breda Kolff was hired at his alma mater, Vanderbilt.
Detroit	Ricky Byrdsong		Perry Watson	Byrdsong left to coach Northwestern. Watson was an assistant at Michigan.
Florida A&M	Willie Booker		Ron Brown	
George Mason	Ernie Nestor		Paul Westhead	Nestor resigned and joined the Wake Forest coaching staff. Westhead was hired after a short stint in the NBA.
Houston	Pat Foster		Alvin Brooks	Foster left to coach Nevada. Brooks ware promoted to head coach.
Idaho	Larry Eustachy		Joe Cravens	Eustachy left to coach Utah State. Cravens was an assistant and short term interim head coach at Utah.
Illinois State	Bob Bender		Kevin Stallings	Bender left to coach Washington. Stallings was hired from the Kansas coaching staff.
Lamar	Mike Newell		Grey Giovanine	
Loyola (MD)	Tom Schneider	Joe Boylan	Skip Prosser	Schneider resigned in the middle of the 1992–93 season starting off 1–10. Boylan, the athletic director, stepped in to finish the season. Prosser was hired from the Xavier coaching staff.
Miami (OH)	Joby Wright		Herb Sendek	Wright left to coach Wyoming. Sendek was hired from the Kentucky coaching staff.
Nevada	Len Stevens		Pat Foster	
North Carolina A&T	Don Corbett		Jeff Capel II	Capel was hired from Division II Fayetteville State.
Northwestern	Bill Foster		Ricky Byrdsong	Foster stepped aside from his coaching duties to be interim athletic director. Foster hired new head coach Byrdsong.
North Texas	Jimmy Gales		Tim Jankovich	Jankovich was hired from the Oklahoma State coaching staff.
Oral Roberts	Ken Trickey		Bill Self	Self was hired from the Oklahoma State coaching staff.
Richmond	Dick Tarrant		Bill Dooley	Tarrant resigned after 12 years with the Spiders going 239–126. Dooley was promoted to head coach of his alma mater.
South Carolina	Steve Newton		Eddie Fogler	Newton resigned and became assistant athletic director at South Carolina.
Stetson	Glenn Wilkes		Dan Hipsher	Wilkes retired after 36 years.
UCF	Joe Dean Jr.		Kirk Speraw	
UNC Asheville	Don Doucette		Randy Wiel	Doucette resigned. Weil was an assistant at North Carolina.
Utah State	Kohn Smith		Larry Eustachy	
Vanderbilt	Eddie Fogler		Jan van Breda Kolff	Fogler left to coach South Carolina.
Washington	Lynn Nance		Bob Bender	
Western Carolina	Greg Blatt		Benny Dees	
Wyoming	Benny Dees		Joby Wright	Dees left to coach Western Carolina.
Youngstown State	John Stroia		Dan Peters	Peters was hired from Division II Saint Joseph's (IN).
