= 1992–93 Nebraska Cornhuskers men's basketball team =

American college basketball season

1992–93 Nebraska Cornhuskers men's basketball

NCAA tournament
- Conference: Big Eight Conference
- Record: 20–11 (8–6 Big Eight)
- Head coach: Danny Nee (7th season)
- Assistant coaches: Gary Bargen; Jeff Smith; Jimmy Williams
- Home arena: Bob Devaney Sports Center

1992–93 Big Eight Conference men's basketball standings
	Conf.				Overall
Team	W		L	PCT	W		L	PCT
No. 9 Kansas	11	–	3	.786	29	–	7	.806
No. 23 Oklahoma State	8	–	6	.571	20	–	9	.690
Iowa State	8	–	6	.571	20	–	11	.645
Nebraska	8	–	6	.571	20	–	11	.645
Kansas State	7	–	7	.500	19	–	11	.633
Oklahoma	7	–	7	.500	20	–	12	.625
Missouri †	5	–	9	.357	19	–	14	.576
Colorado	2	–	12	.143	10	–	17	.370
† 1993 Big Eight tournament winner As of April 5, 1993; Rankings from AP poll

The 1992–93 Nebraska Cornhuskers men's basketball team represented the University of Nebraska–Lincoln during the 1992–93 college basketball season. Led by head coach Danny Nee (7th season), the Cornhuskers competed in the Big Eight Conference and played their home games at the Bob Devaney Sports Center. They finished with a record of 20–11 overall and 8–6 in Big Eight Conference play. Nebraska earned an at-large bid to the 1993 NCAA tournament as the #10 seed in the East region.

== Roster ==
1992–93 Nebraska Cornhuskers men's basketball team
Players
Coaches

Pos.	#	Name	Height	Weight	Year	Previous school	Hometown
G	12	Jamar Johnson	6 ft 0 in (1.83 m)	180 lb (82 kg)	Jr	Concord	Elkhart, IN
G	21	Erick Strickland	6 ft 3 in (1.91 m)	200 lb (91 kg)	Fr	Bellevue West	Bellevue, NE
G	24	Jaron Boone	6 ft 6 in (1.98 m)	180 lb (82 kg)	Fr	Skyline	Salt Lake City, UT
G	30	Jason Glock	6 ft 5 in (1.96 m)	190 lb (86 kg)	So	Wahoo	Wahoo, NE
G	32	Andre Woolridge	6 ft 1 in (1.85 m)	190 lb (86 kg)	Fr	Benson	Omaha, NE
F	33	Tom Best	6 ft 8 in (2.03 m)	235 lb (107 kg)	Jr	Thornwood	South Holland, IL
C	34	Derrick Chandler	6 ft 10 in (2.08 m)	245 lb (111 kg)	Sr	DeMatha	Mitchellville, MD
F	41	Bruce Chubick	6 ft 7 in (2.01 m)	215 lb (98 kg)	Jr	West Holt	Atkinson, NE
F	43	Terrance Badgett	6 ft 6 in (1.98 m)	205 lb (93 kg)	RS Fr	Omaha South	Omaha, NE
G	52	Eric Piatkowski	6 ft 7 in (2.01 m)	215 lb (98 kg)	Jr	Stevens	Rapid City, SD

Head coach

Danny Nee

Assistant coach(es)

- Gary Bargen
- Jeff Smith
- Jimmy Williams

Legend

- (C) Team captain
- (S) Suspended
- (I) Ineligible
- (W) Walk-on
- Injured
- Current redshirt

Roster
Last update: March 29, 2020

== Schedule and results ==
Date time, TV	Rank^{#}	Opponent^{#}	Result	Record	Site city, state
Regular Season
Dec 4, 1992*		Colgate; Ameritas Classic	W 108–76	1–0	Bob Devaney Sports Center; Lincoln, Nebraska
Dec 5, 1992*		Kent State; Ameritas Classic	W 85-61	2–0	Bob Devaney Sports Center; Lincoln, Nebraska
Dec 7, 1992*	No. 25	The Citadel	W 86-46	3–0	Bob Devaney Sports Center; Lincoln, Nebraska
Dec 10, 1992*	No. 25	Creighton; Rivalry	W 100–83	4–0	Bob Devaney Sports Center; Lincoln, Nebraska
Dec 12, 1992*	No. 25	at Wichita State	W 71-64	5–0	Levitt Arena; Wichita, Kansas
Dec 19, 1992*	No. 20	Appalachian State	W 93-83	6–0	Bob Devaney Sports Center; Lincoln, Nebraska
Dec 21, 1992*	No. 20	UT Arlington	W 93-83	7–0	Bob Devaney Sports Center; Lincoln, Nebraska
Dec 23, 1992*	No. 17	at Southern California	L 64-74	7–1	L. A. Sports Arena; Los Angeles California
Dec 27, 1992*	No. 17	vs. No. 6 Michigan; Rainbow Classic	L 73–88	7–2	Neal S. Blaisdell Center; Honolulu, Hawaii
Dec 28, 1992*	No. 20	vs. Louisiana; Rainbow Classic	L 80-109	7–3	Neal S. Blaisdell Center; Honolulu, Hawaii
Dec 29, 1992*	No. 20	vs. Fordham; Rainbow Classic	W 79-55	8–3	Neal S. Blaisdell Center; Honolulu, Hawaii
Jan 2, 1993*	No. 20	Eastern Illinois	W 70-54	9-3	Bob Devaney Sports Center; Lincoln, Nebraska
Jan 5, 1993*		Southern Utah	W 100-85	10-3	Bob Devaney Sports Center; Lincoln, Nebraska
Jan 9, 1993*		at Kansas City	W 66-65	11-3	Municipal Auditorium; Kansas City, Missouri
Jan 14, 1993		at No. 10 Oklahoma	L 89-102	11-4 (0-1)	Lloyd Noble Center; Norman, Oklahoma
Jan 16, 1993		at Oklahoma State	L 73-78	11-5 (0-2)	Gallagher-Iba Arena; Stillwater, Oklahoma
Jan 20, 1993*		Sacramento State	W 86-70	12-5	Bob Devaney Sports Center; Lincoln, Nebraska
Jan 23, 1993		Kansas State	L 64-66	12-6 (0-3)	Bob Devaney Sports Center; Lincoln, Nebraska
Jan 25, 1993		at Colorado	W 82-67	13-6 (1-3)	Coors Event Center; Boulder, Colorado
Jan 30, 1993		Missouri	W 88-87	14-6 (2-3)	Bob Devaney Sports Center; Lincoln, Nebraska
Feb 3, 1993		at Iowa State	L 69-96	14-7 (2-4)	James H. Hilton Coliseum; Ames Iowa
Feb 7, 1993		Kansas	W 68-64	15-7 (3-4)	Bob Devaney Sports Center; Lincoln, Nebraska
Feb 13, 1993		at No. 23 Kansas State	W 80-59	16-7 (4-4)	Bramlage Coliseum; Manhattan, Kansas
Feb 15, 1993		Oklahoma State	L 63-73	16-8 (4-5)	Bob Devaney Sports Center; Lincoln, Nebraska
Feb 21, 1993		at Missouri	W 76-75	17-8 (5-5)	Hearnes Center; Columbia, Missouri
Feb 24, 1993		Colorado	W 76-67	18-8 (6-5)	Bob Devaney Sports Center; Lincoln, Nebraska
Feb 27, 1993		Iowa State	W 91–87	19–8 (7–5)	Bob Devaney Sports Center; Lincoln, Nebraska
Mar 3, 1993		at No. 8 Kansas	L 83–94	19–9 (7–6)	Allen Fieldhouse; Lawrence, Kansas
Mar 7, 1993		Oklahoma	W 94–83	20–9 (8–6)	Bob Devaney Sports Center; Lincoln, Nebraska
Big Eight Tournament
Mar 12, 1993*		vs. Kansas State; Big Eight Tournament Quarterfinal	L 45–47	20–10	Kemper Arena; Kansas City, Missouri
NCAA Tournament
Mar 19, 1993*	(10 E)	vs. (7 E) No. 24 New Mexico State; First Round	L 79–93	20–11	Carrier Dome (14,287); Syracuse, New York
*Non-conference game. ^{#}Rankings from AP Poll. (#) Tournament seedings in parentheses. E=East. All times are in Central Time.
