= 1993 MEAC men's basketball tournament =

- Classification: Division I
- Season: 1992–93
- Teams: 9
- Site: Norfolk Scope; Norfolk, Virginia
- Champions: Coppin State (2nd title)
- Winning coach: Fang Mitchell (2nd title)
- MVP: Dion Schultz (Coppin State)

1992–93 MEAC men's basketball standings
	Conf.				Overall
Team	W		L	PCT	W		L	PCT
Coppin State †	16	–	0	1.000	22	–	8	.733
South Carolina State	9	–	7	.563	16	–	13	.552
North Carolina A&T	9	–	7	.563	14	–	13	.519
Morgan State	9	–	7	.563	9	–	17	.346
Florida A&M	8	–	8	.500	10	–	18	.357
Maryland Eastern Shore	7	–	9	.438	13	–	14	.481
Delaware State	6	–	10	.375	13	–	16	.448
Howard	6	–	10	.375	10	–	18	.357
Bethune–Cookman	2	–	14	.125	3	–	24	.111
† 1993 MEAC tournament winner Rankings from AP Poll

The 1993 Mid-Eastern Athletic Conference men's basketball tournament took place March 3–6, 1993, at the Norfolk Scope in Norfolk, Virginia. Coppin State defeated Delaware State, 80–53 in the championship game, to win its second MEAC Tournament title.

The Eagles earned an automatic bid to the 1993 NCAA tournament as No. 15 seed in the East region. In the round of 64, Coppin State fell to No. 2 seed Cincinnati 93–66.

== Format ==
All nine conference members participated, with the top seven teams receiving a bye to the quarterfinal round.

== Bracket ==
First round March 3
8	Howard	86
9	Bethune–Cookman	72

Quarterfinals; March 4
1	Coppin State	65
8	Howard	57
4	Morgan State	87
5	Florida A&M	90
3	South Carolina State	59
6	Maryland Eastern Shore	57
2	North Carolina A&T	79
7	Delaware State	88

Semifinals; March 5
1	Coppin State	81
5	Florida A&M	69
3	South Carolina State	64
7	Delaware State	75

Final; March 6
1	Coppin State	80
7	Delaware State	53
