= 1992–93 Coastal Carolina Chanticleers men's basketball team =

American college basketball season

1992–93 Coastal Carolina Chanticleers men's basketball

Big South tournament champions

NCAA tournament
- Conference: Big South
- Record: 22–10 (12–4 Big South)
- Head coach: Russ Bergman
- Assistant coaches: Mike Selvy; Gary Leiner; Mike Murphy
- Home arena: Kimbel Arena

1992–93 Big South Conference men's basketball standings
| | Conf. | | | | Overall |
| Team | W | | L | PCT | W | | L | PCT |
|---|---|---|---|---|---|---|---|---|
| Towson State | 14 | – | 2 | .875 | 18 | – | 9 | .667 |
| Coastal Carolina † | 12 | – | 4 | .750 | 22 | – | 10 | .688 |
| Campbell | 10 | – | 6 | .625 | 12 | – | 15 | .444 |
| Liberty | 9 | – | 7 | .563 | 16 | – | 14 | .533 |
| Radford | 8 | – | 8 | .500 | 16 | – | 15 | .516 |
| UMBC | 7 | – | 9 | .438 | 12 | – | 16 | .429 |
| Charleston Southern | 5 | – | 11 | .313 | 9 | – | 18 | .333 |
| Winthrop | 5 | – | 11 | .313 | 14 | – | 16 | .467 |
| UNC Asheville | 2 | – | 14 | .125 | 4 | – | 23 | .148 |
† 1993 Big South tournament winner Rankings from AP Poll

The 1992–93 Coastal Carolina Chanticleers men's basketball team represented Coastal Carolina University during the 1992–93 college basketball season. This was head coach Russ Bergman's fifth season at Coastal Carolina. The Chanticleers competed in the Big South Conference and played their home games at Kimbel Arena. They finished the season 22–10, 12–4 (adjusted to 11–5) in Big South play to finish in second place. The Chanticleers won the 1993 Big South Conference men's basketball tournament to advance to the 1993 NCAA tournament. Playing as the No. 16 seed in the West Region, the team was beaten in the opening round by No. 1 seed and eventual National runner-up Michigan and the famed Fab Five.

Senior forward Tony Dunkin ended his career as the school's career scoring leader. Dunkin was also named the Big South Conference Men's Player of the Year for an unprecedented fourth straight season.

== Roster ==
1992–93 Coastal Carolina Chanticleers men's basketball team
Players
Coaches

| Pos. | # | Name | Height | Weight | Year | Hometown |
|---|---|---|---|---|---|---|
| G | | KeKe Hicks | 6 ft 4 in (1.93 m) | — | So |
| | | Michael Hopkins | — | — | Sr |
| F | 25 | Tony Dunkin | 6 ft 7 in (2.01 m) | 215 lb (98 kg) | Sr | Rains, South Carolina |

Head coach

- Russ Bergman

Assistant coach(es)

Legend

- (C) Team captain
- (S) Suspended
- (I) Ineligible
- (W) Walk-on
- Injured
- Current redshirt

== Schedule and results ==
| Date time, TV | Rank^{#} | Opponent^{#} | Result | Record | Site (attendance) city, state |
Regular season
| Dec 1, 1992* | | Methodist | W 101–51 | 1–0 | Kimbel Arena; Conway, South Carolina |
| Dec 5, 1992* | | Bryan (TN) | W 112–88 | 2–0 | Kimbel Arena; Conway, South Carolina |
| Dec 10, 1992* | | at Boston University | W 85–78 ^{OT} | 3–0 | Case Gym; Boston, Massachusetts |
| Dec 12, 1992* | | at Boston College | L 65–69 | 3–1 | Silvio O. Conte Forum; Boston, Massachusetts |
| Dec 18, 1992* | | vs. Northeast Louisiana | W 77–68 | 4–1 | Neal S. Blaisdell Center; Honolulu, Hawaii |
| Dec 19, 1992* | | at Hawaii | L 62–66 | 4–2 | Neal S. Blaisdell Center; Honolulu, Hawaii |
| Dec 28, 1992* | | vs. No. 9 Arkansas | L 74–93 | 4–3 | Barton Coliseum (7,386); Little Rock, Arkansas |
| Jan 2, 1993* | | South Carolina State | W 90–75 | 5–3 | Kimbel Arena; Conway, South Carolina |
| Jan 6, 1993* | | at Charleston | L 60–65 | 5–4 | John Kresse Arena; Charleston, South Carolina |
| Jan 9, 1993 | | at Liberty | W 66–65 ^{OT} | 6–4 (1–0) | Vines Center; Lynchburg, Virginia |
| Jan 11, 1993 | | at Radford | L 83–84 | 6–5 (1–1) | Dedmon Center; Radford, Virginia |
| Jan 14, 1993 | | UMBC | W 115–98 | 7–5 (2–1) | Kimbel Arena; Conway, South Carolina |
| Jan 16, 1993 | | Towson State | L 74–77 | 7–6 (2–2) | Kimbel Arena; Conway, South Carolina |
| Jan 18, 1993* | | at Missouri | L 69–94 | 7–7 | Hearnes Center; Columbia, Missouri |
| Jan 23, 1993 | | Liberty | L 74–81 ^{OT} | 7–8 (2–3) | Kimbel Arena; Conway, South Carolina |
| Jan 25, 1993 | | at UNC Asheville | W 65–59 | 8–8 (3–3) | Justice Center; Asheville, North Carolina |
| Jan 28, 1993* | | Charleston | W 58–57 | 9–8 | Kimbel Arena; Conway, South Carolina |
| Jan 30, 1993 | | Radford | W 96–95 ^{OT} | 10–8 (4–3) | Kimbel Arena; Conway, South Carolina |
| Feb 3, 1993 | | Charleston Southern | W 84–63 | 11–8 (5–3) | Kimbel Arena; Conway, South Carolina |
| Feb 6, 1993 | | at Towson State | L 69–74 | 11–9 (5–4) | Towson Center; Towson, Maryland |
| Feb 8, 1993 | | at UMBC | W 84–63 | 12–9 (6–4) | Retriever Activities Center; Baltimore, Maryland |
| Feb 11, 1993* | | Belmont Abbey | W 93–62 | 13–9 | Kimbel Arena; Conway, South Carolina |
| Feb 13, 1993 | | at Winthrop | W 74–70 | 14–9 (7–4) | Winthrop Coliseum; Rock Hill, South Carolina |
| Feb 15, 1993 | | UNC Asheville | W 100–68 | 15–9 (8–4) | Kimbel Arena; Conway, South Carolina |
| Feb 18, 1993 | | at Campbell | W 74–70 | 16–9 (9–4) | Carter Gymnasium; Buies Creek, North Carolina |
| Feb 22, 1993 | | at Charleston Southern | W 45–37 | 17–9 (10–4) | Buccaneer Field House; North Charleston, South Carolina |
| Feb 24, 1993 | | Winthrop | W 79–64 | 18–9 (11–4) | Kimbel Arena; Conway, South Carolina |
| Feb 27, 1993 | | Campbell | W 80–50 | 19–9 (12–4) | Kimbel Arena; Conway, South Carolina |
Big South tournament
| Mar 4, 1993* | (2) | at (7) Charleston Southern; Quarterfinals | W 79–66 | 20–9 | North Charleston Coliseum; North Charleston, South Carolina |
| Mar 5, 1993* | (2) | vs. (6) UMBC; Semifinals | W 66–59 | 21–9 | North Charleston Coliseum; North Charleston, South Carolina |
| Mar 6, 1993* | (2) | vs. (8) Winthrop; Championship game | W 78–65 | 22–9 | North Charleston Coliseum; North Charleston, South Carolina |
NCAA tournament
| Mar 19, 1993* | (16 W) | vs. (1 W) No. 3 Michigan; First Round | L 53–84 | 22–10 | McKale Center (13,532); Tucson, Arizona |
*Non-conference game. ^{#}Rankings from AP poll. (#) Tournament seedings in parentheses. W=West. All times are in Eastern Time Zone.

== Awards and honors ==
- Tony Dunkin – Big South Conference Men's Player of the Year (4th)
