= 1992–93 Iowa State Cyclones men's basketball team =

American college basketball season

1992–93 Iowa State Cyclones men's basketball

NCAA tournament
- Conference: Big Eight Conference
- Record: 20-11 (8-6 Big Eight)
- Head coach: Johnny Orr (13th season)
- Home arena: Hilton Coliseum

1992–93 Big Eight Conference men's basketball standings
	Conf.				Overall
Team	W		L	PCT	W		L	PCT
No. 9 Kansas	11	–	3	.786	29	–	7	.806
No. 23 Oklahoma State	8	–	6	.571	20	–	9	.690
Iowa State	8	–	6	.571	20	–	11	.645
Nebraska	8	–	6	.571	20	–	11	.645
Kansas State	7	–	7	.500	19	–	11	.633
Oklahoma	7	–	7	.500	20	–	12	.625
Missouri †	5	–	9	.357	19	–	14	.576
Colorado	2	–	12	.143	10	–	17	.370
† 1993 Big Eight tournament winner As of April 5, 1993; Rankings from AP poll

The 1992–93 Iowa State Cyclones men's basketball team represented Iowa State University during the 1992–93 NCAA Division I men's basketball season. The Cyclones were coached by Johnny Orr, who was in his 13th season. They played their home games at Hilton Coliseum in Ames, Iowa.

They finished the season 20–11, 8–6 in Big Eight play to finish tied for second place. Their 23 wins were a school record at the time. They lost to seventh-seeded Missouri in the 1993 Big Eight conference tournament semifinals. The Cyclones qualified for the 1993 NCAA Division I men's basketball tournament, losing to UCLA, 81–70 in the West Regional first round.

Games were televised by ESPN, Raycom Sports, Prime Sports, CBS, the Cyclone Television Network and the Hawkeye Television Network.

== Previous season ==
In the previous season, the Cyclones finished the season 21–13, 5–9 in Big Eight play to finish tied for sixth place. They defeated Missouri in the 1992 Big Eight conference tournament quarterfinals before losing to Oklahoma State, 69–60. They qualified for the 1991–92 NCAA men's basketball tournament, defeating UNC Charlotte 76–74 in the first round, before losing to Kentucky in the second round, 106–98.

== Roster ==
Roster
Name	Position	Class
Fred Hoiberg	Guard	Sophomore
Loren Meyer	Center	Sophomore
Julius Michalik	Forward	Sophomore
Hurl Beechum	Forward	Sophomore
Justus Thigpen	Guard	Senior
Ron Bayless	Guard	Senior
Howard Eaton	Forward	Senior
Morgan Wheat	Forward	Senior
Fred Brown	Guard	Junior
Marc Carlson	Forward	Junior
Donnell Bivens	Forward	Junior
Mike Bergman	Forward	Junior

== Schedule and results ==
Date time, TV	Rank^{#}	Opponent^{#}	Result	Record	Site city, state
Regular season
November 18, 1992*; 7:00 pm, Cyclone Television Network	No. 19	Indiana State; Preseason NIT	W 84-69	1-0	Hilton Coliseum; Ames, Iowa
November 20, 1992*; 8:30 pm, ESPN	No. 19	at No. 9 Florida State; Preseason NIT	L 86-109	1-1	Donald L. Tucker Center; Tallahassee, Florida
Exhibition
November 23, 1992*; 7:00 pm		Porto (Portugal); Exhibition	W 85-68		Hilton Coliseum; Ames, Iowa
Regular season
December 1, 1992*; 7:00 pm, Cyclone Television Network		Buffalo	W 106-36	2-1	Hilton Coliseum; Ames, Iowa
December 3, 1992*; 7:00 pm, Cyclone Television Network		at Creighton	W 69-58	3-1	Omaha Civic Auditorium; Omaha, Nebraska
December 6, 1992*; 2:00 pm, Cyclone Television Network		at Northern Iowa	W 74-67	4-1	UNI-Dome; Cedar Falls, Iowa
December 12, 1992*; 7:00 pm, Hawkeye Television Network		at No. 8 Iowa; Rivalry	L 51-78	4-2	Carver–Hawkeye Arena; Iowa City, Iowa
December 18, 1992*; 7:00 pm, Cyclone Television Network		Mercer	W 87-46	5-2	Hilton Coliseum (13,433); Ames, Iowa
December 19, 1992*; 7:00 pm, ESPN		vs. Michigan	L 72-94	5-3	The Palace of Auburn Hills (18,103); Auburn Hills, Michigan
December 22, 1992*; 7:00 pm, Cyclone Television Network		Texas Southern	W 111-74	6-3	Hilton Coliseum; Ames, Iowa
December 29, 1992*; 7:00 pm, Cyclone Television Network		Minnesota	W 99-65	7-3	Hilton Coliseum; Ames, Iowa
December 31, 1992*; 7:00 pm, Cyclone Television Network		Bethune–Cookman	W 115-57	8-3	Hilton Coliseum; Ames, Iowa
Exhibition
January 5, 1993*; 7:00 pm		Marathon Oil; Exhibition	W 97-64		Hilton Coliseum (11,500); Ames, Iowa
Regular season
January 9, 1993; 1:00 pm, Raycom		at No. 4 Kansas	L 71-78	8-4 (0-1)	Allen Fieldhouse; Lawrence, Kansas
January 14, 1993; 8:30 pm, ESPN		Oklahoma State	W 81-72	9-4 (1-1)	Hilton Coliseum; Ames, Iowa
January 16, 1993; 7:00 pm, Raycom		at Missouri	L 49-64	9-5 (1-2)	Hearnes Center; Columbia, Missouri
January 20, 1993*; 7:00 pm, Cyclone Television Network		Southern Utah	W 91-63	10-5	Hilton Coliseum; Ames, Iowa
January 23, 1993; 1:00 pm, Raycom		No. 12 Oklahoma	W 81-74 ^{OT}	11-5 (2-2)	Hilton Coliseum; Ames, Iowa
January 27, 1993*; 7:00 pm, Cyclone Television Network		Drake	W 119-81	12-5	Hilton Coliseum; Ames, Iowa
January 30, 1993; 3:00 pm, Raycom		at Oklahoma State	L 77-94	12-6 (2-3)	Gallagher-Iba Arena; Stillwater, Oklahoma
February 3, 1993; 7:00 pm, Cyclone Television Network		Nebraska	W 96-69	13-6 (3-3)	Hilton Coliseum; Ames, Iowa
February 6, 1993; 1:00 pm, Raycom		Colorado	W 94-74	14-6 (4-3)	Hilton Coliseum; Ames, Iowa
February 10, 1993; 7:30 pm, Prime Sports		at No. 23 Kansas State	L 66-68 ^{OT}	14-7 (4-4)	Bramlage Coliseum; Manhattan, Kansas
February 13, 1993; 1:00 pm, Raycom		at Oklahoma	L 77-81	14-8 (4-5)	Lloyd Noble Center; Norman, Oklahoma
February 17, 1993; 7:00 pm, Cyclone Television Network		Missouri	W 65-50	15-8 (5-5)	Hilton Coliseum; Ames, Iowa
February 22, 1993; 8:30 pm, ESPN		No. 7 Kansas; ESPN Big Monday	W 75-71	16-8 (6-5)	Hilton Coliseum; Ames, Iowa
February 24, 1993*; 7:00 pm, Cyclone Television Network		Florida Atlantic	W 89-46	17-8	Hilton Coliseum; Ames, Iowa
February 27, 1993; 1:00 pm, Raycom		at Nebraska	L 87-91	17-9 (6-6)	Devaney Center; Lincoln, Nebraska
March 3, 1993; 8:00 pm CT, Cyclone Television Network		at Colorado	W 67-66	18-9 (7-6)	Coors Events Center; Boulder, Colorado
March 6, 1993; 1:00 pm, Raycom		Kansas State	W 79-61	19-9 (8-6)	Hilton Coliseum; Ames, Iowa
Big Eight tournament
March 12, 1993; 8:20 pm, Raycom		vs. Oklahoma; Big Eight tournament quarterfinals	W 69-55	20-9	Kemper Arena; Kansas City, Missouri
March 13, 1993; 3:30 pm, Raycom		vs. Missouri; Big Eight tournament semifinals	L 63-67	20-10	Kemper Arena; Kansas City, Missouri
NCAA Tournament
March 19, 1993*; 9:30 pm CT, CBS		vs. No. 9 seed UCLA; NCAA West Regional First round	L 70-81	20-11	McKale Center (13,532); Tucson, Arizona
*Non-conference game. ^{#}Rankings from AP poll. (#) Tournament seedings in parentheses. All times are in Central Time.

== Awards and honors ==
- All-Big Eight Selections
  Justus Thigpen (1st)
  Ron Bayless (2nd)
  Fred Hoiberg (HM)
- Academic All-Big Eight
  Fred Hoiberg
  Julius Michalik
- Ralph Olsen Award
  Justus Thigpen
