= 1992–93 Coppin State Eagles men's basketball team =

American college basketball season

1992–93 Coppin State Eagles men's basketball
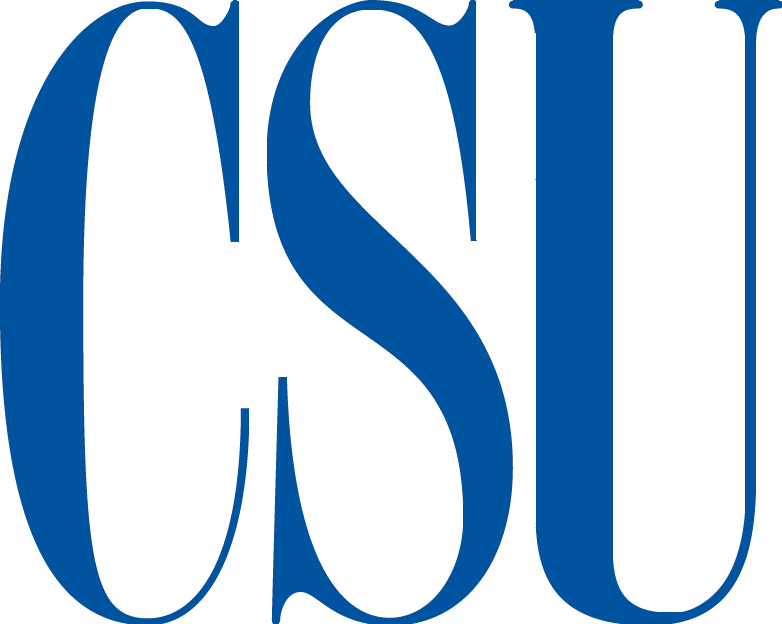

MEAC Regular season champions MEAC tournament champions

NCAA tournament
- Conference: Mid-Eastern Athletic Conference
- Record: 22–8 (16–0 MEAC)
- Head coach: Fang Mitchell (7th season)
- Home arena: Coppin Center

1992–93 MEAC men's basketball standings
	Conf.				Overall
Team	W		L	PCT	W		L	PCT
Coppin State †	16	–	0	1.000	22	–	8	.733
South Carolina State	9	–	7	.563	16	–	13	.552
North Carolina A&T	9	–	7	.563	14	–	13	.519
Morgan State	9	–	7	.563	9	–	17	.346
Florida A&M	8	–	8	.500	10	–	18	.357
Maryland Eastern Shore	7	–	9	.438	13	–	14	.481
Delaware State	6	–	10	.375	13	–	16	.448
Howard	6	–	10	.375	10	–	18	.357
Bethune–Cookman	2	–	14	.125	3	–	24	.111
† 1993 MEAC tournament winner Rankings from AP Poll

The 1992–93 Coppin State Eagles men's basketball team represented Coppin State University during the 1992–93 NCAA Division I men's basketball season. The Eagles, led by 7th year head coach Fang Mitchell, played their home games at the Coppin Center and were members of the Mid-Eastern Athletic Conference. They finished the season 22–8, 16–0 in MEAC play to win the conference regular season title. The Eagles then went on to win the MEAC tournament title to receive an automatic bid to the NCAA tournament as No. 15 seed in the East region. Coppin State lost in the first round to No. 2 seed Cincinnati, 93–66.

== Roster ==
1992–93 Coppin State Eagles men's basketball team
Players
Coaches

Pos.	#	Name	Height	Weight	Year	Previous school	Hometown
G		Sidney Goodman	6 ft 3 in (1.91 m)	—	So
F		Stephen Stewart	6 ft 5 in (1.96 m)	225 lb (102 kg)	Fr	Parkway	Philadelphia, Pennsylvania
C		Michael Thomas	6 ft 8 in (2.03 m)	—	Fr

Head coach

- Fang Mitchell

Assistant coach(es)

Legend

- (C) Team captain
- (S) Suspended
- (I) Ineligible
- (W) Walk-on
- Injured
- Current redshirt

== Schedule ==
Date time, TV	Rank^{#}	Opponent^{#}	Result	Record	Site (attendance) city, state
Regular season
Dec 1, 1992*		at Kansas State	L 61–85	0–1	Bramlage Coliseum; Manhattan, Kansas
Dec 23, 1992*		at Boston College	L 51–65	2–4	Silvio O. Conte Forum; Boston, Massachusetts
Dec 28, 1992*		at UC Santa Barbara	L 55–65	2–5	The Thunderdome; Santa Barbara, California
Feb 27, 1993		Maryland-Eastern Shore	W 75–51	19–7	Coppin Center; Baltimore, Maryland
MEAC tournament
Mar 4, 1993*		vs. Howard; Quarterfinals	W 65–57	20–7	Norfolk Scope; Norfolk, Virginia
Mar 5, 1993*		vs. Florida A&M; Semifinals	W 81–69	21–7	Norfolk Scope; Norfolk, Virginia
Mar 6, 1993*		vs. Delaware State; Championship game	W 80–53	22–7	Norfolk Scope; Norfolk, Virginia
NCAA tournament
Mar 19, 1993*	(15 E)	vs. (2 E) No. 7 Cincinnati; First Round	L 66–93	22–8	Carrier Dome; Syracuse, New York
*Non-conference game. ^{#}Rankings from AP Poll. (#) Tournament seedings in parentheses. SE=Southeast. All times are in Eastern Time.
