= 1992–93 Oklahoma State Cowboys basketball team =

American college basketball season

1992–93 Oklahoma State Cowboys basketball

NCAA tournament, second round
- Conference: Big Eight Conference

Ranking
- AP: No. 23
- Record: 20–9 (8–6 Big Eight)
- Head coach: Eddie Sutton (3rd season)
- Assistant coach: Bill Self (7th season)
- Home arena: Gallagher-Iba Arena (Capacity: 6,381)

1992–93 Big Eight Conference men's basketball standings
	Conf.				Overall
Team	W		L	PCT	W		L	PCT
No. 9 Kansas	11	–	3	.786	29	–	7	.806
No. 23 Oklahoma State	8	–	6	.571	20	–	9	.690
Iowa State	8	–	6	.571	20	–	11	.645
Nebraska	8	–	6	.571	20	–	11	.645
Kansas State	7	–	7	.500	19	–	11	.633
Oklahoma	7	–	7	.500	20	–	12	.625
Missouri †	5	–	9	.357	19	–	14	.576
Colorado	2	–	12	.143	10	–	17	.370
† 1993 Big Eight tournament winner As of April 5, 1993; Rankings from AP poll

The 1992–93 Oklahoma State Cowboys basketball team represented Oklahoma State University as a member of the Big Eight Conference during the 1992–93 NCAA Division I men's basketball season. The team was led by third-year head coach Eddie Sutton and played their home games at Gallagher-Iba Arena. The Cowboys finished with a record of 20–9 (8–6 Big Eight) and tied for second in Big Eight regular season play.

Oklahoma State received an at-large bid to the NCAA tournament as No. 5 seed in the Midwest region. After defeating Marquette in the opening round, the Cowboys were defeated by Louisville, 78–63.

== Roster ==
1992–93 Oklahoma State Cowboys men's basketball team
Players
Coaches

Pos.	#	Name	Height	Weight	Year	Previous school	Hometown
G	15	Randy Rutherford	6 ft 3 in (1.91 m)	185 lb (84 kg)	So	Bacone JC	Broken Bow, Oklahoma
G	22	Brooks Thompson	6 ft 4 in (1.93 m)	195 lb (88 kg)	Jr	Texas A&M	Littleton, Colorado
C	50	Bryant Reeves	7 ft 0 in (2.13 m)	265 lb (120 kg)	So	Gans	Gans, Oklahoma

Head coach

- Eddie Sutton

Assistant coach(es)

- Bill Self
- Rob Evans
- Russ Pennell
- Steve Anthis

Legend

- (C) Team captain
- (S) Suspended
- (I) Ineligible
- (W) Walk-on
- Injured
- Current redshirt

== Schedule and results ==
Date time, TV	Rank^{#}	Opponent^{#}	Result	Record	Site (attendance) city, state
Regular Season
Dec 1, 1992*		Midwestern State	W 86–74	1–0	Gallagher-Iba Arena; Stillwater, Oklahoma
Dec 5, 1992*		at California	L 65–80	1–1	Harmon Gym; Berkeley, California
Dec 9, 1992*		Tulsa	W 85–67	2–1	Gallagher-Iba Arena; Stillwater, Oklahoma
Dec 12, 1992*		Baylor	W 93–75	3–1	Gallagher-Iba Arena; Stillwater, Oklahoma
Dec 19, 1992*		Houston Baptist	W 93–54	4–1	Gallagher-Iba Arena; Stillwater, Oklahoma
Dec 22, 1992*		at TCU	W 65–47	5–1	Daniel-Meyer Coliseum; Fort Worth, Texas
Dec 30, 1992*		Southwest Missouri State	W 74–59	6–1	Gallagher-Iba Arena; Stillwater, Oklahoma
Jan 2, 1993*		vs. SMU	W 75–59	7–1	Tulsa, Oklahoma
Jan 4, 1993*		at Jacksonville	W 60–59	8–1	Jacksonville Memorial Coliseum; Jacksonville, Florida
Jan 9, 1993		Kansas State	L 62–75	8–2 (0–1)	Gallagher-Iba Arena; Stillwater, Oklahoma
Jan 14, 1993		at Iowa State	L 72–81	8–3 (0–2)	Hilton Coliseum; Ames, Iowa
Jan 16, 1993		Nebraska	W 78–73	9–3 (1–2)	Gallagher-Iba Arena; Stillwater, Oklahoma
Jan 21, 1993*		at Oral Roberts	W 90–45	10–3	Mabee Center; Tulsa, Oklahoma
Jan 24, 1993		at Missouri	L 63–79	10–4 (1–3)	Hearnes Center; Columbia, Missouri
Jan 30, 1993		Iowa State	W 94–77	11–4 (2–3)	Gallagher-Iba Arena; Stillwater, Oklahoma
Feb 3, 1993		at Colorado	W 85–61	12–4 (3–3)	Coors Events/Conference Center; Boulder, Colorado
Feb 6, 1993		No. 16 Oklahoma	W 83–76	13–4 (4–3)	Gallagher-Iba Arena; Stillwater, Oklahoma
Feb 10, 1993		at No. 7 Kansas	L 72–84	13–5 (4–4)	Allen Fieldhouse; Lawrence, Kansas
Feb 13, 1993		Colorado	W 77–59	14–5 (5–4)	Gallagher-Iba Arena; Stillwater, Oklahoma
Feb 15, 1993		at Nebraska	W 73–63	15–5 (6–4)	Bob Devaney Sports Center; Lincoln, Nebraska
Feb 20, 1993*		Louisiana Tech	W 80–53	16–5	Gallagher-Iba Arena; Stillwater, Oklahoma
Feb 24, 1993		Missouri	W 77–73	17–5 (7–4)	Gallagher-Iba Arena; Stillwater, Oklahoma
Feb 27, 1993		at Kansas State	W 78–61	18–5 (8–4)	Bramlage Coliseum; Manhattan, Kansas
Mar 1, 1993		at Oklahoma	L 80–89	18–6 (8–5)	Lloyd Noble Center; Norman, Oklahoma
Mar 4, 1993*		Oral Roberts	W 114–85	19–6	Gallagher-Iba Arena; Stillwater, Oklahoma
Mar 7, 1993	No. 19	No. 8 Kansas	L 73–74	19–7 (8–6)	Gallagher-Iba Arena; Stillwater, Oklahoma
Big Eight Tournament
Mar 12, 1993*	(2) No. 21	vs. (7) Missouri; Quarterfinals	L 62–81	19–8	Kemper Arena; Kansas City, Missouri
NCAA tournament
Mar 19, 1993*	(5 MW) No. 23	vs. (12 MW) Marquette; First Round	W 74–62	20–8	RCA Dome; Indianapolis, Indiana
Mar 21, 1993*	(5 MW) No. 23	vs. (4 MW) No. 15 Louisville; Second Round	L 63–78	20–9	RCA Dome; Indianapolis, Indiana
*Non-conference game. ^{#}Rankings from AP Poll. (#) Tournament seedings in parentheses. MW=Midwest. All times are in Central Time.

== Awards and honors ==
- Bryant Reeves – Big Eight Player of the Year
