= 1993 SWAC men's basketball tournament =

Basketball Tournament March 1991 in Texas

- Classification: Division I
- Season: 1992–93
- Teams: 8
- Site: Riverside Centroplex; Baton Rouge, Louisiana
- Champions: Southern (6th title)
- Winning coach: Ben Jobe (4th title)

1992–93 SWAC men's basketball standings
	Conf.				Overall
Team	W		L	PCT	W		L	PCT
Jackson State	13	–	1	.929	25	–	9	.735
Southern †	9	–	5	.643	21	–	10	.677
Alabama State	9	–	5	.643	14	–	13	.519
Texas Southern	8	–	6	.571	12	–	15	.444
Mississippi Valley State	7	–	7	.500	13	–	15	.464
Grambling State	5	–	9	.357	13	–	14	.481
Alcorn State	5	–	9	.357	7	–	20	.259
Prairie View A&M	0	–	14	.000	1	–	26	.037
† 1993 SWAC tournament winner Rankings from AP Poll

The 1993 SWAC men's basketball tournament was held March 11–13, 1993, at the Riverside Centroplex in Baton Rouge, Louisiana. Southern defeated Jackson State, 101–80 in the championship game. The Jaguars received the conference's automatic bid to the 1993 NCAA tournament as No. 13 seed in the West Region.

== Bracket and results ==
Quarterfinals; March 11
1	Jackson State	103
8	Prairie View A&M	70
4	Texas Southern	74
5	Mississippi Valley State	92
3	Southern	105
6	Grambling State	91
2	Alabama State	80
7	Alcorn State	83

Semifinals; March 12
1	Jackson State	85
5	Mississippi Valley State	75
3	Southern	93
7	Alcorn State	75

Final; March 13
1	Jackson State	80
3	Southern	101
