= 1992–93 Kansas Jayhawks men's basketball team =

American college basketball season

1992–93 Kansas Jayhawks men's basketball

Big Eight regular season champions

NCAA men's Division I tournament, Final Four
- Conference: Big Eight Conference

Ranking
- Coaches: No. 4
- AP: No. 9
- Record: 29–7 (11–3 Big Eight)
- Head coach: Roy Williams (5th season)
- Assistant coaches: Matt Doherty (1st season); Steve Robinson (5th season); Kevin Stallings (5th season)
- Captains: Adonis Jordan; Eric Pauley; Rex Walters
- Home arena: Allen Fieldhouse

1992–93 Big Eight Conference men's basketball standings
	Conf.				Overall
Team	W		L	PCT	W		L	PCT
No. 9 Kansas	11	–	3	.786	29	–	7	.806
No. 23 Oklahoma State	8	–	6	.571	20	–	9	.690
Iowa State	8	–	6	.571	20	–	11	.645
Nebraska	8	–	6	.571	20	–	11	.645
Kansas State	7	–	7	.500	19	–	11	.633
Oklahoma	7	–	7	.500	20	–	12	.625
Missouri †	5	–	9	.357	19	–	14	.576
Colorado	2	–	12	.143	10	–	17	.370
† 1993 Big Eight tournament winner As of April 5, 1993; Rankings from AP poll

The 1992–93 Kansas Jayhawks men's basketball team represented the University of Kansas in the 1992–93 NCAA Division I men's basketball season, which was the Jayhawks' 95th basketball season. The head coach was Roy Williams, who served his 5th year at KU. The team played its home games in Allen Fieldhouse in Lawrence, Kansas. Kansas won the Big Eight regular season title and made the Final Four for the second time in three seasons.

== Roster ==
1992–93 Kansas Jayhawks men's basketball team
Players
Coaches

Pos.	#	Name	Height	Weight	Year	Hometown
G	33	Greg Gurley	6 ft 5 in (1.96 m)	185 lb (84 kg)	So	Leawood, Kansas
G	32	Darrin Hancock	6 ft 7 in (2.01 m)	205 lb (93 kg)	Jr	Griffin, Georgia
G	30	Adonis Jordan	5 ft 11 in (1.8 m)	170 lb (77 kg)	Sr	Reseda, California
C	00	Greg Ostertag	7 ft 2 in (2.18 m)	270 lb (122 kg)	So	Duncanville, Texas
C	51	Eric Pauley	6 ft 10 in (2.08 m)	210 lb (95 kg)	Sr	Buena Park, California
G/F	21	Sean Pearson	6 ft 4 in (1.93 m)	195 lb (88 kg)	Fr	LaGrange, Illinois
G	10	Calvin Rayford	5 ft 6 in (1.68 m)	165 lb (75 kg)	So	Milwaukee, Wisconsin
G/F	12	Patrick Richey	6 ft 8 in (2.03 m)	190 lb (86 kg)	Jr	Lee's Summit, Missouri
F	34	Richard Scott	6 ft 7 in (2.01 m)	215 lb (98 kg)	Jr	Little Rock, Arkansas
G	23	Rex Walters	6 ft 4 in (1.93 m)	190 lb (86 kg)	Sr	San Jose, California
G	35	Blake Weichbrodt	6 ft 2 in (1.88 m)	195 lb (88 kg)	Jr	Norman, Oklahoma
G	14	T. J. Whatley	6 ft 4 in (1.93 m)	180 lb (82 kg)	Fr	Benton, Arkansas
G/F	20	Steve Woodberry	6 ft 4 in (1.93 m)	180 lb (82 kg)	Jr	Wichita, Kansas

Head coach

- Roy Williams

Assistant coach(es)

- Matt Doherty
- Steve Robinson
- Kevin Stallings

Legend

- (C) Team captain
- (S) Suspended
- (I) Ineligible
- (W) Walk-on
- Injured
- Current redshirt

== Schedule and results ==
Date time, TV	Rank^{#}	Opponent^{#}	Result	Record	Site city, state
Regular Season
12/1/1992*	No. 3	Georgia	W 76-65	1–0	Allen Fieldhouse; Lawrence, KS
12/5/1992*	No. 3	vs. No. 2 Indiana	W 74-69	2–0	Hoosier Dome; Indianapolis, IN
12/7/1992*	No. 2	Emporia State	W 91-56	3–0	Allen Fieldhouse; Lawrence, KS
12/11/1992*	No. 2	vs. Mississippi Valley State	W 94-46	4–0	Kemper Arena; Kansas City, MO
12/12/1992*	No. 2	vs. UMKC	W 108-62	5-0	Kemper Arena; Kansas City, MO
12/14/1992*	No. 2	Oral Roberts	W 140-72	6-0	Allen Fieldhouse; Lawrence, KS
12/19/1992*	No. 2	East Tennessee State	W 86-83	7-0	Allen Fieldhouse; Lawrence, KS
12/21/1992*	No. 2	NC State	W 84-64	8-0	Allen Fieldhouse; Lawrence, KS
12/27/1992*	No. 2	vs. Jackson State; Rainbow Classic First round	W 93-85	9-0	Neal S. Blaisdell Center; Honolulu, HI
12/28/1992*	No. 2	at Hawaii; Rainbow Classic Semifinals	W 94-66	10-0	Neal S. Blaisdell Center; Honolulu, HI
12/29/1992*	No. 2	vs. No. 6 Michigan; Rainbow Classic Championship Game	L 74-86	10-1	Neal S. Blaisdell Center; Honolulu, HI
1/6/1993*	No. 4	Wichita State	W 103-54	11-1	Allen Fieldhouse; Lawrence, KS
1/9/1993	No. 4	Iowa State	W 78-71	12-1	Allen Fieldhouse; Lawrence, KS
1/11/1993	No. 4	at No. 10 Oklahoma	W 96-85	13-1	Lloyd Noble Center; Norman, OK
1/16/1993*	No. 4	at Louisville	W 98-77	14-1	Freedom Hall; Louisville, KY
1/18/1993	No. 1	at Kansas State; Sunflower Showdown	W 71-65	15-1	Bramlage Coliseum; Manhattan, KS
1/23/1993	No. 1	at Colorado	W 82-51	16-1	Coors Events Center; Boulder, CO
1/25/1993*	No. 1	Long Beach State	L 49-64	16-2	Allen Fieldhouse; Lawrence, KS
1/30/1993	No. 1	Rollins College	W 103-56	17-2	Allen Fieldhouse; Lawrence, KS
2/1/1993	No. 3	Missouri; Border War	W 86-69	18-2	Allen Fieldhouse; Lawrence, KS
2/7/1993	No. 3	at Nebraska	L 64-68	18-3	Bob Devaney Sports Center; Lincoln, NE
2/10/1993	No. 7	Oklahoma State	W 84-72	19-3	Allen Fieldhouse; Lawrence, KS
2/13/1993	No. 7	at Missouri; Border War	W 67-63	20-3	Hearnes Center; Columbia, MO
2/17/1993	No. 6	Oklahoma	L 77-80	20-4	Allen Fieldhouse; Lawrence, KS
2/20/1993	No. 6	Kansas State; Sunflower Showdown	W 77-64	21-4	Allen Fieldhouse; Lawrence, KS
2/22/1993	No. 7	at Iowa State	L 71-75	21-5	Hilton Coliseum; Ames, IA
2/27/1993	No. 7	Colorado	W 72-68	22-5	Allen Fieldhouse; Lawrence, KS
3/3/1993	No. 8	Nebraska	W 94-83	23-5	Allen Fieldhouse; Lawrence, KS
3/7/1993	No. 8	at No. 19 Oklahoma State	W 74-73	24–5 (11–3)	Gallagher-Iba Arena; Stillwater, OK
Big Eight Tournament
3/12/1993	(1) No. 7	vs. (8) Colorado; First round	W 82–65	25–5	Kemper Arena; Kansas City, MO
3/13/1993	(1) No. 7	vs. (5) Kansas State; Semifinals	L 67–74	25–6	Kemper Arena; Kansas City, MO
NCAA tournament
3/18/1993*	(2 MW) No. 9	vs. (15 MW) Ball State; First round	W 94–72	26–6	Rosemont Horizon; Rosemont, IL
3/20/1993*	(2 MW) No. 9	vs. (7 MW) BYU; Second Round	W 90-76	27–6	Rosemont Horizon; Rosemont, IL
3/25/1993*	(2 MW) No. 9	vs. (6 MW) California; Regional semifinals	W 93–76	28–6	St. Louis Arena; St. Louis, MO
3/27/1993*	(2 MW) No. 9	vs. (1 MW) No. 1 Indiana; Regional Finals	W 83–77	29–6	St. Louis Arena; St. Louis, MO
4/3/1993*	(2 MW) No. 9	vs. (1 E) No. 4 North Carolina; National semifinals	L 68–78	29–7	Louisiana Superdome; New Orleans, LA
*Non-conference game. ^{#}Rankings from AP Poll, NCAA tournament seeds shown in parentheses. (#) Tournament seedings in parentheses. MW=Midwest, E=East. All times are in Central Standard Time.

== Rankings ==
Poll	Pre	Wk 1	Wk 2	Wk 3	Wk 4	Wk 5	Wk 6	Wk 7	Wk 8	Wk 9	Wk 10	Wk 11	Wk 12	Wk 13	Wk 14	Wk 15	Wk 16	Wk 17
AP	2	2	3	2	2	2	2	4	4	1	1	3	6	7	8	7	9	13
Coaches																		

*There was no coaches poll in week 1.

== See also ==
- 1993 NCAA Division I men's basketball tournament
