= 1992–93 Kansas State Wildcats men's basketball team =

American college basketball season

1992–93 Kansas State Wildcats men's basketball

NCAA tournament, First Round
- Conference: Big Eight Conference
- Record: 19–11 (7–7 Big Eight)
- Head coach: Dana Altman (3rd season)
- Home arena: Bramlage Coliseum

1992–93 Big Eight Conference men's basketball standings
	Conf.				Overall
Team	W		L	PCT	W		L	PCT
No. 9 Kansas	11	–	3	.786	29	–	7	.806
No. 23 Oklahoma State	8	–	6	.571	20	–	9	.690
Iowa State	8	–	6	.571	20	–	11	.645
Nebraska	8	–	6	.571	20	–	11	.645
Kansas State	7	–	7	.500	19	–	11	.633
Oklahoma	7	–	7	.500	20	–	12	.625
Missouri †	5	–	9	.357	19	–	14	.576
Colorado	2	–	12	.143	10	–	17	.370
† 1993 Big Eight tournament winner As of April 5, 1993; Rankings from AP poll

The 1992–93 Kansas State Wildcats men's basketball team represented Kansas State University as a member of the Big 8 Conference during the 1992–93 NCAA Division I men's basketball season. The head coach was Dana Altman who was in his third season at the helm. The team played its home games at Bramlage Coliseum in Manhattan, Kansas. The Wildcats finished with a record of 19–11 (7–7 Big 8), and received an at-large bid to the NCAA tournament as No. 6 seed in the Southeast region. Kansas State was upset by No. 11 seed Tulane in the opening round of the tournament.

== Roster ==
1992–93 Kansas State Wildcats men's basketball team
Players	Coaches
Pos. / # / Name / Height / Weight / Year / Hometown; G / 24 / Askia Jones / 6 ft 5 in (1.96 m) / 190 lb (86 kg) / Jr / San Antonio, Texas	Head coach: Lon Kruger (Kansas State); Assistant coach(es) Legend: (C) Team captain; (S) Suspended; (I) Ineligible; (W) Walk-on; Injured; Current redshirt; Roster

== Schedule and results ==
Date time, TV	Rank^{#}	Opponent^{#}	Result	Record	Site city, state
Regular Season
Dec 1, 1992*		Coppin State	W 85–61	1–0	Bramlage Coliseum; Manhattan, Kansas
Dec 5, 1992*		Lafayette	W 86–73	2–0	Bramlage Coliseum; Manhattan, Kansas
Dec 8, 1992*		Ohio	W 73–72	3–0	Bramlage Coliseum; Manhattan, Kansas
Dec 12, 1992*		Sam Houston State	W 86–53	4–0	Bramlage Coliseum; Manhattan, Kansas
Dec 18, 1992*		at UMKC	W 66–64	5–0	Municipal Auditorium; Kansas City, Missouri
Dec 21, 1992*		at Wichita State	L 61–74	5–1	Levitt Arena; Wichita, Kansas
Dec 28, 1992*		at Nevada	L 82–83	5–2	Lawlor Events Center; Reno, Nevada
Dec 30, 1992*		at UC Santa Barbara	W 60–59	6–2	The Thunderdome; Santa Barbara, California
Jan 5, 1993*		La Salle	W 79–59	7–2	Bramlage Coliseum; Manhattan, Kansas
Jan 9, 1993		at Oklahoma State	W 75–62	8–2 (1–0)	Gallagher-Iba Arena; Stillwater, Oklahoma
Jan 13, 1993*		Northeastern Illinois	W 97–68	9–2	Bramlage Coliseum; Manhattan, Kansas
Jan 16, 1993		Colorado	W 83–78	10–2 (2–0)	Bramlage Coliseum; Manhattan, Kansas
Jan 18, 1993		No. 1 Kansas	L 65–71	10–3 (2–1)	Bramlage Coliseum; Manhattan, Kansas
Jan 23, 1993		at Nebraska	W 66–64	11–3 (3–1)	Bob Devaney Sports Center; Lincoln, Nebraska
Jan 26, 1993*		Central Connecticut State	W 81–56	12–3	Bramlage Coliseum; Manhattan, Kansas
Jan 30, 1993*		Temple	W 86–63	13–3	Bramlage Coliseum; Manhattan, Kansas
Feb 3, 1993		No. 16 Oklahoma	W 62–61	14–3 (4–1)	Bramlage Coliseum; Manhattan, Kansas
Feb 8, 1993		at Missouri	L 51–67	14–4 (4–2)	Hearnes Center; Columbia, Missouri
Feb 10, 1993		Iowa State	W 68–66	15–4 (5–2)	Bramlage Coliseum; Manhattan, Kansas
Feb 13, 1993		Nebraska	L 59–80	15–5 (5–3)	Bramlage Coliseum; Manhattan, Kansas
Feb 16, 1993		at Colorado	L 77–88	15–6 (5–4)	Coors Events Center; Boulder, Colorado
Feb 20, 1993		at No. 6 Kansas	L 64–77	15–7 (5–5)	Allen Fieldhouse; Lawrence, Kansas
Feb 23, 1993		at Oklahoma	W 67–63	16–7 (6–5)	Lloyd Noble Center; Norman, Oklahoma
Feb 27, 1993		Oklahoma State	L 61–78	16–8 (6–6)	Bramlage Coliseum; Manhattan, Kansas
Mar 3, 1993		Missouri	W 78–67	17–8 (7–6)	Bramlage Coliseum; Manhattan, Kansas
Mar 6, 1993		at Iowa State	L 61–79	17–9 (7–7)	Hilton Coliseum; Ames, Iowa
Big 8 Tournament
Mar 12, 1993*		vs. Nebraska; Quarterfinals	W 47–45	18–9	Kemper Arena; Kansas City, Missouri
Mar 13, 1993*		vs. No. 7 Kansas; Semifinals	W 74–67	19–9	Kemper Arena; Kansas City, Missouri
Mar 14, 1993*		vs. Missouri; Championship game	L 56–68	19–10	Kemper Arena; Kansas City, Missouri
NCAA Tournament
Mar 18, 1993*	(6 SE)	vs. (11 SE) Tulane; First round	L 53–55	19–11	Orlando Arena; Orlando, Florida
*Non-conference game. ^{#}Rankings from AP Poll. (#) Tournament seedings in parentheses. MW=Midwest.
