= 1992–93 Southern Jaguars basketball team =

American college basketball season

1992–93 Southern Jaguars basketball

SWAC tournament champions

NCAA tournament, Second round
- Conference: Southwestern Athletic Conference
- Record: 21–10 (9–5 SWAC)
- Head coach: Ben Jobe (7th season)
- Home arena: F. G. Clark Center

1992–93 SWAC men's basketball standings
	Conf.				Overall
Team	W		L	PCT	W		L	PCT
Jackson State	13	–	1	.929	25	–	9	.735
Southern †	9	–	5	.643	21	–	10	.677
Alabama State	9	–	5	.643	14	–	13	.519
Texas Southern	8	–	6	.571	12	–	15	.444
Mississippi Valley State	7	–	7	.500	13	–	15	.464
Grambling State	5	–	9	.357	13	–	14	.481
Alcorn State	5	–	9	.357	7	–	20	.259
Prairie View A&M	0	–	14	.000	1	–	26	.037
† 1993 SWAC tournament winner Rankings from AP Poll

The 1992–93 Southern Jaguars basketball team represented Southern University during the 1992–93 NCAA Division I men's basketball season. The Jaguars, led by head coach Ben Jobe, played their home games at the F. G. Clark Center and were members of the Southwestern Athletic Conference. They finished the season 21–10, 9–5 in SWAC play to finish in a tie for second place. They were champions of the SWAC tournament to earn an automatic bid to the 1993 NCAA tournament where they upset ACC Tournament champion and No. 4 seed Georgia Tech in the opening round. The Jaguars lost in the second round to No. 12 seed George Washington, 90–80.

== Roster ==
1992–93 Southern Jaguars men's basketball team
Players
Coaches

Pos.	#	Name	Height	Weight	Year	Hometown
F	32	Leonard White	6 ft 7 in (2.01 m)	215 lb (98 kg)	Sr	Century, Florida
G	33	Terry Thames	6 ft 2 in (1.88 m)	—	Sr
PF	45	Jervaughn Scales	6 ft 5 in (1.96 m)	195 lb (88 kg)	Jr	Dayton, Ohio

Head coach

- Ben Jobe

Assistant coach(es)

Legend

- (C) Team captain
- (S) Suspended
- (I) Ineligible
- (W) Walk-on
- Injured
- Current redshirt

== Schedule ==
Date time, TV	Rank^{#}	Opponent^{#}	Result	Record	Site (attendance) city, state
Regular season
Dec 1, 1992*		Paul Quinn	W 100–83	1–0	F. G. Clark Center; Baton Rouge, Louisiana
Dec 4, 1992*		at Alabama-Birmingham	L 83–100	1–1	Bartow Arena; Birmingham, Alabama
Feb 27, 1993		at Alcorn State	W 89–78	17–9 (9–5)	Physical Education Complex; Lorman, Mississippi
1993 SWAC tournament
Mar 11, 1993*	(3)	vs. (6) Grambling; Quarterfinals	W 105–91	18–9	Riverside Centroplex; Baton Rouge, Louisiana
Mar 12, 1993*	(3)	vs. (7) Alcorn State; Semifinals	W 93–75	19–9	Riverside Centroplex; Baton Rouge, Louisiana
Mar 13, 1993*	(3)	vs. (1) Jackson State; Championship	W 101–80	20–9	Riverside Centroplex; Baton Rouge, Louisiana
1993 NCAA tournament
Mar 19, 1993*	(13 W)	vs. (4 W) No. 18 Georgia Tech; First round	W 93–78	21–9	McKale Center; Tucson, Arizona
Mar 21, 1993*	(13 W)	vs. (12 W) George Washington; Second round	L 80–90	21–10	McKale Center; Tucson, Arizona
*Non-conference game. ^{#}Rankings from AP Poll. (#) Tournament seedings in parentheses. W=West. All times are in Central Time.

== Players in the 1993 NBA draft ==
Round	Pick	Player	NBA club
2	53	Leonard White	Los Angeles Clippers
