= 1993 Big South Conference men's basketball tournament =

- Classification: Division I
- Season: 1992–93
- Teams: 9
- Site: North Charleston Coliseum; North Charleston, SC
- Champions: Coastal Carolina (3rd title)
- Winning coach: Russ Bergman (3rd title)
- MVP: Tony Dunkin (Coastal Carolina)

1992–93 Big South Conference men's basketball standings
	Conf.				Overall
Team	W		L	PCT	W		L	PCT
Towson State	14	–	2	.875	18	–	9	.667
Coastal Carolina †	12	–	4	.750	22	–	10	.688
Campbell	10	–	6	.625	12	–	15	.444
Liberty	9	–	7	.563	16	–	14	.533
Radford	8	–	8	.500	16	–	15	.516
UMBC	7	–	9	.438	12	–	16	.429
Charleston Southern	5	–	11	.313	9	–	18	.333
Winthrop	5	–	11	.313	14	–	16	.467
UNC Asheville	2	–	14	.125	4	–	23	.148
† 1993 Big South tournament winner Rankings from AP Poll

The 1993 Big South Conference men's basketball tournament took place March 3–6, 1993, at the North Charleston Coliseum in North Charleston, South Carolina. For the third time in their school history, the Coastal Carolina Chanticleers won the tournament, led by head coach Russ Bergman.

Although Coastal Carolina won the tournament, due to participation of ineligible players, the Chanticleers victories and title were vacated, and no official conference champion for the tournament was declared.

== Format ==
All of the conference's nine members participated in the tournament, hosted at the North Charleston Coliseum. The bottom two finishers played in a first-round game, with the winner playing the first seed. This was the first season for UMBC and Towson State as conference members, and UNC Greensboro was transitioning to the conference as well.

== Bracket ==
First round March 3
8	Winthrop	101
9	UNC Asheville	87

Quarterfinals; March 4
1	Towson State	79
8	Winthrop	83
4	Liberty	69
5	Radford	73
3	Campbell	67
6	UMBC	85
2	Coastal Carolina	79
7	Charleston Southern	66

Semifinals; March 5
5	Radford	69
8	Winthrop	87
2	Coastal Carolina	66
6	UMBC	59

Finals; March 6
2	Coastal Carolina	78
8	Winthrop	65

- Source

== All-Tournament Team ==
- Tony Dunkin, Coastal Carolina
- Mohammed Acha, Coastal Carolina
- KeKe Hicks, Coastal Carolina
- Eddie Gay, Winthrop
- Mark Hailey, Winthrop
