= 1993 West Coast Conference men's basketball tournament =

- Classification: Division I
- Season: 1992–93
- Teams: 8
- Site: War Memorial Gymnasium; San Francisco, California
- Champions: Santa Clara (2nd title)
- Winning coach: Dick Davey (1st title)
- MVP: Steve Nash (Santa Clara)

1992–93 West Coast Conference men's basketball standings
| | Conf. | | | | Overall |
| Team | W | | L | PCT | W | | L | PCT |
|---|---|---|---|---|---|---|---|---|
| Pepperdine | 11 | – | 3 | .786 | 23 | – | 8 | .742 |
| Gonzaga | 10 | – | 4 | .714 | 19 | – | 9 | .679 |
| Santa Clara † | 9 | – | 5 | .643 | 19 | – | 12 | .613 |
| San Francisco | 8 | – | 6 | .571 | 19 | – | 12 | .613 |
| San Diego | 7 | – | 7 | .500 | 13 | – | 14 | .481 |
| Saint Mary's (CA) | 6 | – | 8 | .429 | 11 | – | 16 | .407 |
| Portland | 3 | – | 11 | .214 | 9 | – | 18 | .333 |
| Loyola Marymount | 2 | – | 12 | .143 | 7 | – | 20 | .259 |
† Conference tournament winner Rankings from AP poll

The 1993 West Coast Conference men's basketball tournament took place on March 6–8, 1993. All rounds were held in San Francisco, California at the War Memorial Gymnasium.

The Santa Clara Broncos won the WCC Tournament title and an automatic bid to the 1993 NCAA tournament. Steve Nash of Santa Clara was named Tournament MVP.

== Format ==
With eight teams participating, all eight teams were placed into the first round, with teams seeded and paired based on regular-season records. After the first round, teams were re-seeded so the highest-remaining team was paired with the lowest-remaining time in one semifinal with the other two teams slotted into the other semifinal.

== Bracket ==
Quarter finals Saturday, March 6
1 | Pepperdine | 80
8 | Loyola Marymount | 66
4 | San Francisco | 96*
5 | San Diego | 93
(Pairings are reseeded after the first round)
3 | Santa Clara | 79
6 | Saint Mary's | 68
2 | Gonzaga | 77
7 | Portland | 57

Semi-finals; Sunday, March 7
1 | Pepperdine | 88
4 | San Francisco | 67
2 | Gonzaga | 51
3 | Santa Clara | 53

Finals; Monday, March 8
1 | Pepperdine | 63
3 | Santa Clara | 73

* - denotes overtime period
