= Steve Nash =

Canadian basketball player and coach (born 1974)

Steve Nash OC OBC
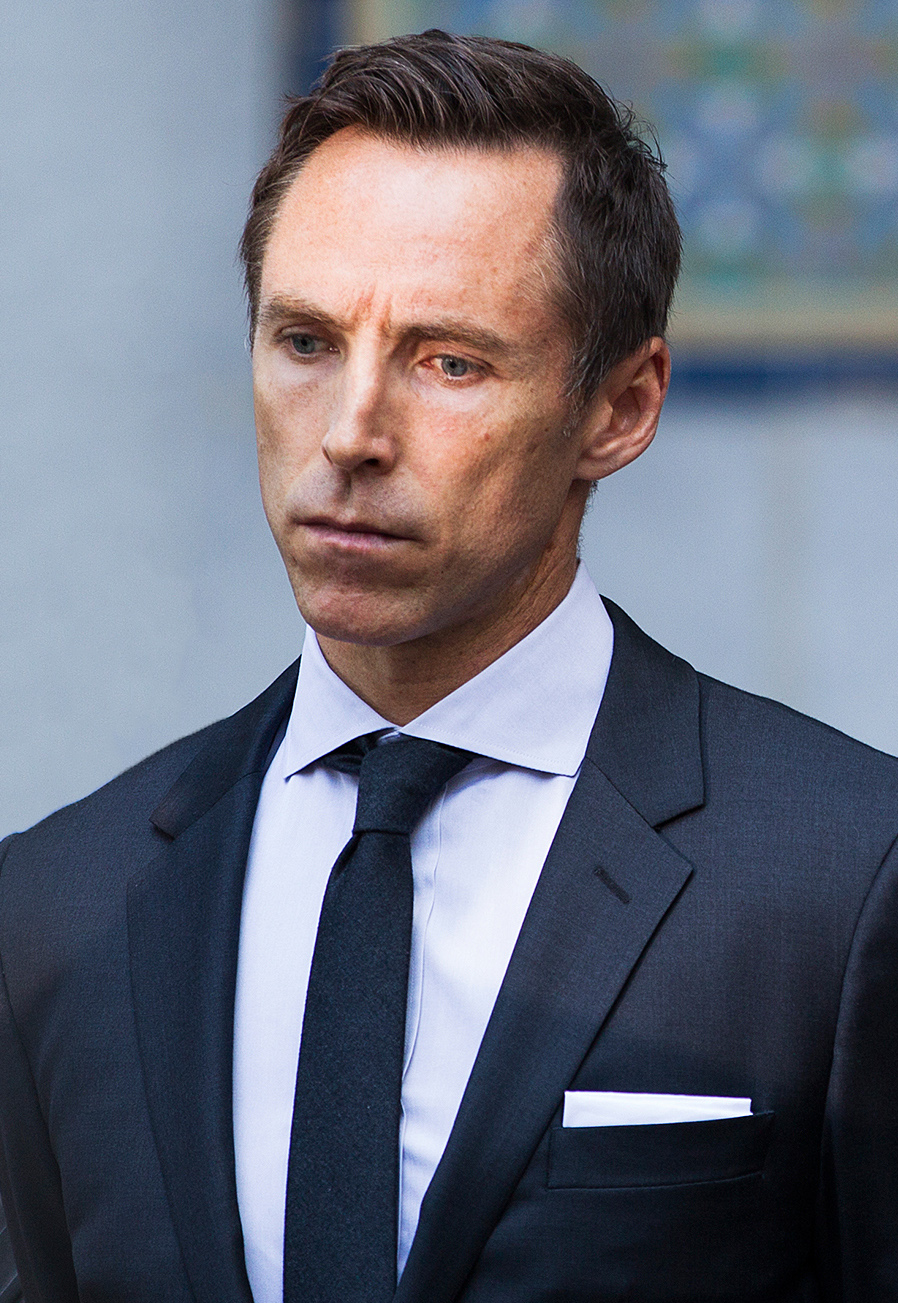
- Nash in 2014

Phoenix Suns
- Title: Senior advisor
- League: NBA

Personal information
- Born: 7 February 1974 (age 52) Johannesburg, South Africa
- Listed height: 6 ft 3 in (1.91 m)
- Listed weight: 178 lb (81 kg)

Career information
- High school: St. Michaels (Victoria, British Columbia)
- College: Santa Clara (1992–1996)
- NBA draft: 1996: 1st round, 15th overall pick
- Drafted by: Phoenix Suns
- Playing career: 1996–2015
- Position: Point guard
- Number: 13, 10
- Coaching career: 2020–2022

Career history

Playing
- 1996–1998: Phoenix Suns
- 1998–2004: Dallas Mavericks
- 2004–2012: Phoenix Suns
- 2012–2015: Los Angeles Lakers

Coaching
- 2020–2022: Brooklyn Nets

Career highlights
- 2× NBA Most Valuable Player (2005, 2006); 8× NBA All-Star (2002, 2003, 2005–2008, 2010, 2012); 3× All-NBA First Team (2005–2007); 2× All-NBA Second Team (2008, 2010); 2× All-NBA Third Team (2002, 2003); 5× NBA assists leader (2005–2007, 2010, 2011); No. 13 retired by Phoenix Suns; NBA 75th Anniversary Team; 2× FIBA AmeriCup MVP (1999, 2003); Lou Marsh Trophy (2005); 3× Lionel Conacher Award (2002, 2005, 2006); 2× WCC Player of the Year (1995, 1996); 2× First-team All-WCC (1995, 1996); WCC tournament MVP (1993); No. 11 retired by Santa Clara Broncos

Career statistics
- Points: 17,387 (14.3 ppg)
- Rebounds: 3,642 (3.0 rpg)
- Assists: 10,335 (8.5 apg)
- Stats at NBA.com
- Stats at Basketball Reference
- Basketball Hall of Fame
- FIBA Hall of Fame
Medals
Men's basketball
Representing Canada
FIBA AmeriCup
Silver medal – second place	1999 San Juan	National team
Bronze medal – third place	2001 Neuquén	National team
Universiade
Silver medal – second place	1991 Sheffield	National team
Silver medal – second place	1993 Buffalo	National team

Stephen John Nash OC OBC (born 7 February 1974) is a Canadian former professional basketball player and coach. He played 18 seasons in the National Basketball Association (NBA), where he was an eight-time All-Star, a seven-time All-NBA selection, and a two-time NBA Most Valuable Player. He ranks as one of the top players in NBA history in career three-point shooting, free-throw shooting, total assists, and assists per game. In 2018, he was inducted into the Naismith Memorial Basketball Hall of Fame.

Nash grew up playing several sports, and after a successful high school basketball career in British Columbia, earned a scholarship to Santa Clara University in California. In his four seasons with the Broncos, the team appeared in three NCAA tournaments, and he was twice named the West Coast Conference (WCC) Player of the Year. Nash graduated from Santa Clara as the team's all-time leader in assists.

He was taken as the 15th pick in the 1996 NBA draft by the Phoenix Suns, but had little impact and was traded to the Dallas Mavericks in 1998. By his fourth season with the Mavericks, he was voted to his first NBA All-Star Game and earned his first All-NBA selection. The following season, Nash, Dirk Nowitzki, and Michael Finley led the Mavericks to the Western Conference Finals. He became a free agent after the 2003–04 season and returned to the Phoenix Suns. In the 2004–05 season, Nash led the Suns to the Western Conference finals and was named the league's MVP. He was named MVP again in the 2005–06 season and was runner-up for a third consecutive MVP to Nowitzki in 2006–07. At various points in his career, Nash led the league in assists and free throw percentage.

Nash has been honoured for his contributions to various philanthropic causes. In 2006, Time named him one of the 100 most influential people in the world. Nash was appointed to the Order of Canada in 2007 and invested to the order in 2016, and was awarded an Honorary Doctor of Laws from the University of Victoria in 2008. Nash has been a co-owner of the Vancouver Whitecaps FC of Major League Soccer (MLS) since the team entered the league in 2011. From 2012 to 2019, he served as general manager of the Canadian men's national basketball team, for whom he played from 1991 to 2003, making one Olympic appearance and being twice named FIBA AmeriCup MVP. In 2021, Nash was named to the NBA 75th Anniversary Team.

== Early life ==
Nash was born in Johannesburg, South Africa, to a Welsh mother, Jean, and English father, John, on 7 February 1974. His family moved to Regina, Saskatchewan, when he was 18 months old, before settling in Victoria, British Columbia. He holds British as well as Canadian citizenship. Before the family settled in Canada, his father played professional soccer in various parts of the world. Nash often played soccer and ice hockey with his younger brother Martin, and he did not start playing basketball until he was 12 or 13 years old; he also played rugby and lacrosse. In grade eight, he told his mother that one day he would play in the NBA and become a star. He was a neighbour to future NHL stars Russ and Geoff Courtnall, who used to babysit him and played soccer coached by Nash's father.

Nash originally attended Mount Douglas Secondary School in Saanich, British Columbia, but after his grades began to drop, his parents decided to enroll him at St. Michaels University School, a private school in Victoria. There, he starred in basketball, soccer, and rugby union. While playing basketball during his senior season, Nash averaged 21.3 points, 11.2 assists, and 9.1 rebounds per game. In the 1991–92 season, he led his team in his final year to the British Columbia AAA provincial championship title, and was named the province's Player of the Year.

== College career ==
Although Nash's high school coach, Ian Hyde-Lay, sent letters of inquiry and highlight reels to more than 30 American universities, Nash was not recruited by any university, until Santa Clara coach Dick Davey requested video footage of the young guard. After watching Nash in person, Davey said he "was nervous as hell just hoping that no one else would see him. It didn't take a Nobel Prize winner to figure out this guy's pretty good. It was just a case of hoping that none of the big names came around." However, Davey also told Nash he was "the worst defensive player" he had ever seen.

Nash received a scholarship by Santa Clara for the 1992–93 season. It had been five years since the Broncos made the NCAA Division I men's basketball tournament, but Nash led the Broncos to a WCC tournament title and an upset win over the No. 2-seeded Arizona in the first round of the 1993 tourney, sinking six straight free throws in the last 30 seconds. Santa Clara lost to Temple in the next round, but the season was considered successful. The next season, the Broncos managed only a 5–7 conference record. The team rebounded in the 1994–95 season, topping the WCC. Nash, who led the conference in scoring and assists, was named Conference Player of the Year. The Broncos returned to the NCAA tournament, but lost in the first round to Mississippi State. After the season, Nash contemplated turning professional and decided against it when he learned that he would probably not be considered as a first-round pick in the 1995 NBA draft.

My heroes were Isiah Thomas, Michael Jordan, Magic Johnson. I think they were just so competitive and creative. Especially Isiah, he was somebody that wasn't very tall. He had played the game mostly on the floor and it made me feel that I could find a way to do the same.

— Steve Nash

In the 1995–96 season, Nash began attracting the attention of national media and professional scouts. He had spent the previous summer honing his skills, playing with the Canadian national team and working out with established NBA players Jason Kidd and Gary Payton. Santa Clara again captured the WCC title, and for the second consecutive year, Nash was named Conference Player of the Year, the first Bronco to repeat since Kurt Rambis. He scored 28 points in leading the No. 10 seed Broncos to a first-round upset win over No. 7 seed Maryland, but then the Broncos were eliminated by Kansas. Nash's performances ensured that he earned an honourable mention All-America as a senior by The Associated Press and the USBWA. He also finished his career as Santa Clara's all-time leader in assists (510), free throw percentage (.862), and made and attempted three-pointers (263–656). He remains third on the school's all-time scoring list (1,689) and holds Santa Clara's single-season free throw percentage record (.894). In September 2006, Nash's jersey No. 11 was retired, becoming the first Santa Clara student-athlete to receive that honour.

== Professional career ==
=== Phoenix Suns (1996–1998) ===
After graduating with a degree in sociology, Nash was selected 15th overall by the Phoenix Suns in the first round of the 1996 NBA draft. Upon hearing the draft announcement, Suns fans booed in disapproval of the relatively unknown player. This was because despite his impressive college accomplishments, Nash had not played in one of the major college conferences. A major influence in Phoenix's choice was assistant coach Donnie Nelson, who met Nash back in high school as he was coached by Nelson's friend Ken Shields, and would eventually befriend the player as he played in Santa Clara. During his first two seasons in the NBA, Nash played a supporting role behind NBA star point guards Kevin Johnson, Sam Cassell, and later, Jason Kidd. Both Johnson and Cassell had NBA Finals experience, while Kidd was the second overall pick in the 1994 NBA draft and already an All-Star when he arrived at Phoenix.

In his rookie season, Nash only managed 10.5 minutes a game, but in his second season, his playing time increased and he ranked 13th in the league in three-point field-goal percentage. Nelson, who had become assistant general manager of the Dallas Mavericks under his father, Don Nelson, convinced him to acquire the under-used Nash. After the 1998 NBA draft, Nash was traded from the Suns to the Mavericks in exchange for Martin Müürsepp, Bubba Wells, the draft rights to Pat Garrity, and a first-round draft pick (later used to draft future Phoenix teammate Shawn Marion).

=== Dallas Mavericks (1998–2004) ===
In Dallas, Nash established himself as a formidable point guard, beginning a decade as one of the game's top players. Prior to the start of the season, which had been pushed back due to the lockout, Nash signed a six-year, $33 million extension, which carried a player option following the fifth season. During his first year as a Maverick, he started in all 40 games he played in, and averaged 7.9 points, 2.9 rebounds and 5.5 assists per game. The 19–31 Mavericks failed to make the 1999 playoffs, but in the 1999–2000 season, the team's prospects improved considerably. Nash missed 25 mid-season games due to an ankle injury, but came back to record six double-doubles in the last month of play. He finished the season with averages of 8.6 points and 4.9 assists per game. More importantly for the team, second-year teammate and friend Dirk Nowitzki was blossoming quickly into a top player, veteran Michael Finley was having an All-Star-calibre year, and the team's new owner, billionaire Mark Cuban, was bringing new energy and excitement to the franchise. Nash now had a supportive environment in which he could thrive.

In the 2000–01 season, Nash averaged 15.6 points and 7.3 assists per game in a breakout season. With Nash directing the team's offense, Nowitzki and Finley playing at their best, and the acquisition of All-Star Juwan Howard complementing the high-scoring trio, the Mavericks earned a playoff berth for the first time in more than a decade. Dallas lost in the Western Conference Semifinals four games to one to the San Antonio Spurs, but it marked the beginning of a memorable run for Nash and the Mavericks. In the 2001–02 season, Nash posted career-highs of 17.9 points and 7.7 assists per game and earned a spot in the NBA All-Star Game and on the All-NBA Third Team. He was now an All-Star, increasingly appearing in television commercials and, with Finley and Nowitzki, a part of the Dallas Mavericks "Big Three". Dallas earned another trip to the playoffs but lost again in the Semifinals to the Sacramento Kings four games to one.

Nash closely replicated his previous season's performance in the 2002–03 season, averaging 17.7 points and 7.3 assists per game, again earning All-Star and All-NBA Third Team honours. Nowitzki and Nash led the Mavericks from a 14-game winning streak to open the season all the way to the Western Conference finals, where they lost to the eventual NBA champions, the San Antonio Spurs four games to two. It was only the second Conference finals appearance in the franchise's history. The 2003–04 season saw an offensively boosted Mavericks roster (with the acquisitions of Antoine Walker and Antawn Jamison) but a dip in Nash's scoring contributions. As a result, he was not selected for the All-Star and All-NBA team rosters even though he achieved new career highs in assists per game (8.8) and free throw accuracy (91.6%). In the 2004 playoffs, the fifth-seeded Dallas failed to make progress yet again as the Sacramento Kings saw them off four games to one.

After the 2003–04 season, Nash became a free agent. He attempted to negotiate a long-term contract with Cuban, who was paying Walker, Finley, Nowitzki and Jamison nearly $50 million in combined salaries that season. Cuban wanted to build his franchise around the younger Nowitzki and did not want to risk signing the 30-year-old Nash to a long-term deal, and offered Nash a four-year deal worth about $9 million annually, with a fifth year partially guaranteed. The Phoenix Suns on the other hand offered the point guard a six-year, $63 million contract. Nash was reluctant to leave Dallas and returned to Cuban to see if he would match the deal; Cuban did not, and Nash signed with the Suns for the 2004–05 season. The Canadian would go on to win two League MVP awards with Phoenix, and on a 14 June 2006 appearance on the Late Show with David Letterman, Cuban wondered out loud, "... you know Steve's a great guy and I love him to death, but why couldn't he play like an MVP for us?"

=== Return to Phoenix (2004–2012) ===
==== 2004–05 season ====
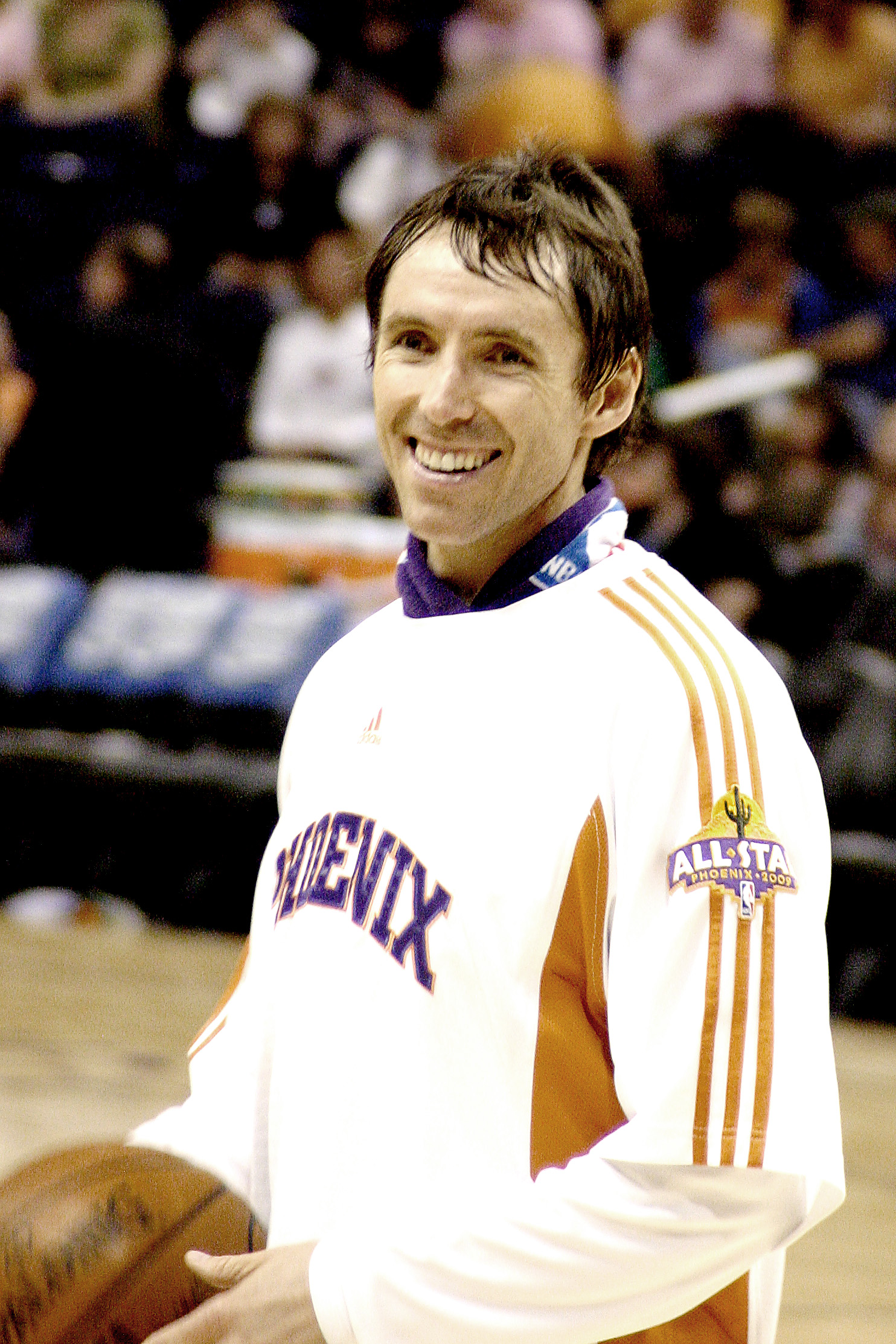
After Nash's return to Phoenix in 2004, they won 33 more games than they did the previous season.

Nash joined a Suns team which had emerging young players in Shawn Marion, Joe Johnson, and Amar'e Stoudemire. In the season before Nash arrived, the Suns had recorded a 29–53 win–loss record, and they were projected to have another poor season. Head coach Mike D'Antoni favoured an up-tempo style of basketball; this required smaller and more athletic players with the capability to outrun and outshoot their opponents. On 21 November 2004, Nash recorded 22 points, 18 assists and 4 steals in a 122–111 win over the Los Angeles Clippers. Nash's familiarity with this style combined with the athleticism of his teammates produced an NBA-best 62–20 record and a points-per-game average of 110.4, the highest in a decade. The catalyst of this turnaround, Nash averaged 11.5 assists per game while making 50.2% of his field goals and 43.1% of his three-pointers in the regular season. He edged Shaquille O'Neal to win the 2004–05 NBA MVP award, becoming the first Canadian to earn the honour, as well as the third point guard ever to be named MVP, along with Magic Johnson and Bob Cousy. In the 2005 playoffs, Phoenix swept the Memphis Grizzlies in four games before meeting the Dallas Mavericks in the second round. Nash led the Suns to a 4–2 series win, and the Suns reached the Western Conference finals for the first time since 1993, but lost to the eventual NBA Champions and arch-rival, the San Antonio Spurs, in five games.

==== 2005–06 season ====
In the next season, Stoudemire suffered a serious knee injury, and Johnson and Quentin Richardson were traded away. The Suns were not expected to repeat their successful 2005 season, but with Nash directing the same high-tempo offence, the team compiled a respectable 54–28 record and won the division title. On 2 January 2006, Nash recorded 28 points, 5 rebounds and 22 assists in a 140–133 triple overtime loss to the New York Knicks. The Suns were again the highest-scoring team in the league with seven players averaging double figures in points per game, and Nash was voted for the first time to start for the 2006 Western All-Star team. In the last game of the season, Nash recorded a triple-double of 16 points, 10 rebounds and 12 assists in a 106–96 road win over the Trail Blazers. Having recorded career highs in points (18.8), rebounds (4.2), field goal percentage (.512) and free throw percentage (a league-leading .921), and leading the league with 10.5 assists per game, Nash was named the league MVP for the second year in a row. In the first round of the 2006 playoffs, Phoenix overcame a 3–1 deficit against the Los Angeles Lakers and won the series 4–3. The Los Angeles Clippers were their Conference semifinals opponents, and the Suns again needed seven games to clinch the series. For the second year in a row, however, the Suns bowed out in the conference finals, this time to Nash's former team, Dallas.

==== 2006–07 season ====
In the 2006–07 season, Nash had another stellar campaign, averaging 18.6 points and a career-high 11.6 assists per game while becoming the first person since Magic Johnson in 1990–91 to average 18 points and 11 assists per game during the regular season. Nash received the most votes for first-team All-NBA and was joined by teammate Stoudemire; the two were the first teammates to make the first team since Kobe Bryant and Shaquille O'Neal in 2003–04. Nash received 129 first-place votes and 645 total points from the panel of 129 media members. He narrowly missed being MVP a third consecutive time, coming in second with 44 first place votes to 83 for Dirk Nowitzki. In the 2007 playoffs, the Suns eliminated the Lakers in five games before losing 4–2 to the Spurs in the conference semifinals.

==== 2007–08 season ====
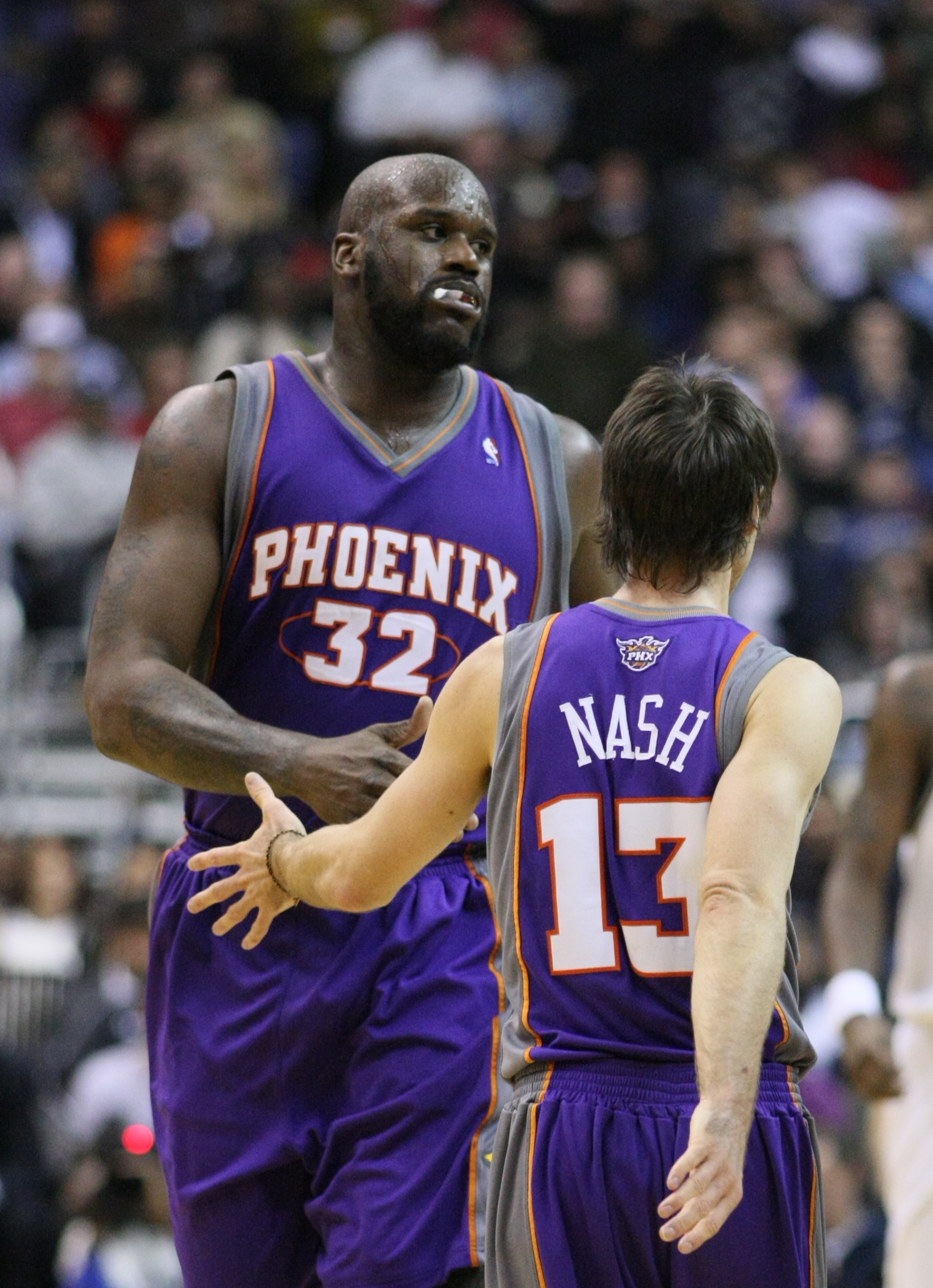
Nash with Shaquille O'Neal in 2009

Nash played in 81 regular season games during the 2007–08 season; in this campaign, the Western Conference was especially competitive and he led the Suns to 55 wins and the sixth seed for the 2008 playoffs. Although there was a dip in his regular season output, Nash's shooting remained sharp; the accuracy of his shooting was on par with his 2005–06 MVP campaign (shooting at least 50% from the field, 40% from the three-point arc, and 90% from the free throw line). On 31 January 2008, he collected his All-Star stripes for the sixth time in his career. However, Nash continued to experience agony in the playoffs. Despite a mid-season trade that sent Shawn Marion to the Miami Heat and brought four-time NBA champion Shaquille O'Neal to the team, the Suns were defeated in the first round of the 2008 playoffs by the San Antonio Spurs for the third time in four years. In the deciding Game 5, Nash was perceived to have suffered from "elimination-game jitters", and turned over the ball twice in the final two minutes of what was a tight contest. Nevertheless, Nash was later named to the All-NBA Second Team for the 2007–08 season.

==== 2008–09 season ====
Before the 2008–09 season began, coach D'Antoni was replaced by Terry Porter, who preferred a more defensive-oriented style of basketball. The Suns had difficulties adapting to this new system, and even a December trade involving sending stalwarts Raja Bell and Boris Diaw to the Charlotte Bobcats for athletic swingman Jason Richardson saw the team continue to struggle. Porter was then replaced by Alvin Gentry in February after a 28–23 record, but the Suns were unable to secure the final seed for the 2009 playoffs, resulting in Nash missing the playoffs for the first time since he returned to Phoenix for his second stint.

==== 2009–10 season ====
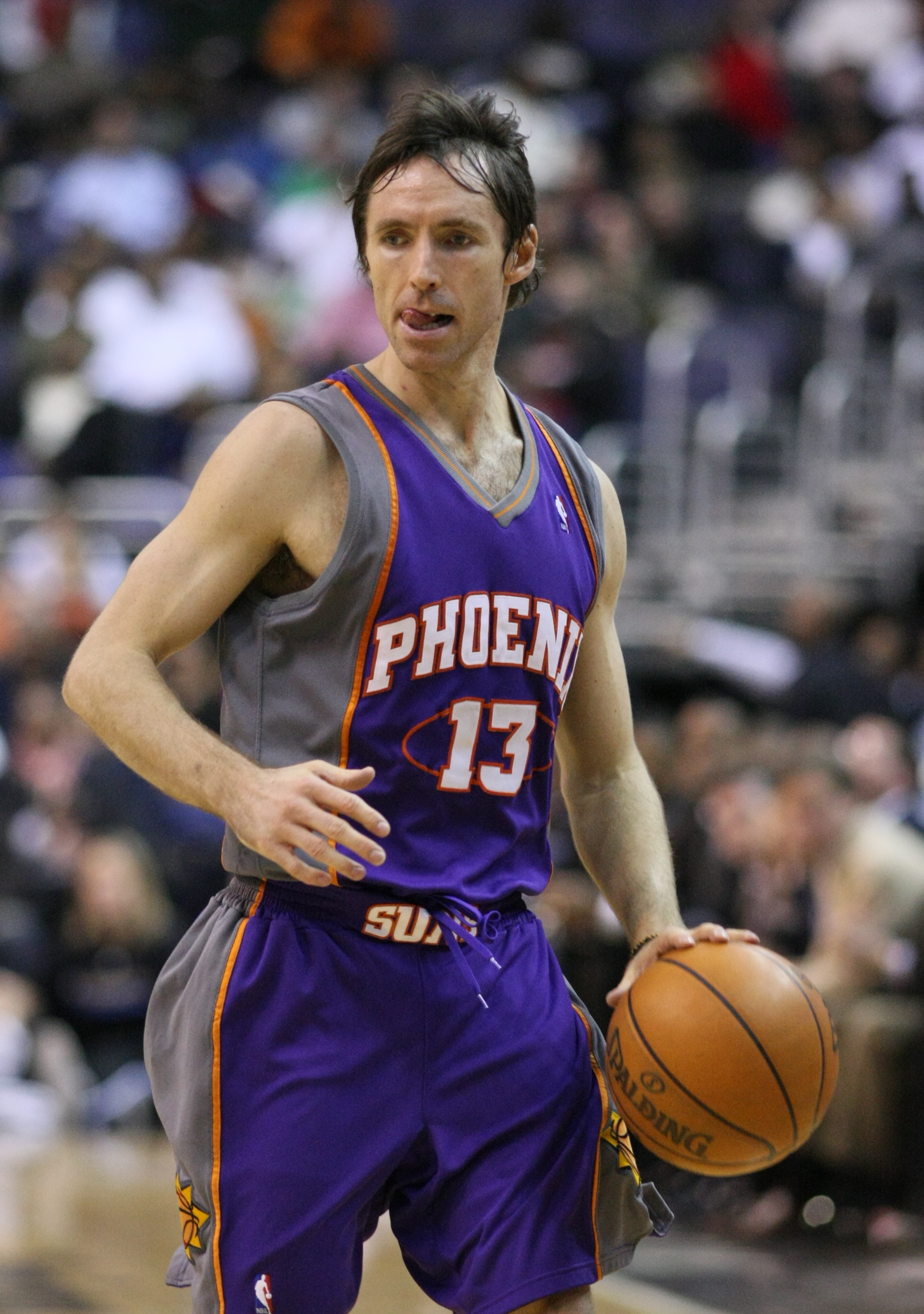
Nash in 2009

In the off-season, Nash, entering the final year of his contract, signed a two-year, $22 million extension to keep him in Phoenix through 2011–12 season. Nash and the Suns opened the 2009–10 season with a series of strong performances, going 8–1 in their first nine games (a franchise-best since 1980–81), with Nash producing two 20-assists games. On 21 January 2010, Nash was named as the starting point guard for the West for the 2010 NBA All-Star Game. With him operating at the point, the Suns were the highest-scoring team in the league for the fifth season in a row, and were seeded third in the conference for the 2010 playoffs with 54 wins. Behind solid performances by Richardson and veteran Grant Hill, the Suns defeated the Portland Trail Blazers 4–2 in the first round of the playoffs, and swept the Spurs 4–0 in the second round. The Suns met the defending champions, Los Angeles Lakers, in the conference finals. After losing the first two games, Phoenix won the next two to tie the series. A Ron Artest buzzer-beater in Game 5 pushed the Lakers one game closer to the Finals, and Kobe Bryant's 37 points in Game 6 completed the defeat of the Suns.

==== 2010–11 season ====
The Suns underwent two major roster changes in the 2010–11 season. During the pre-season, Stoudemire left for New York, while longtime teammate Leandro Barbosa was traded for Hedo Türkoğlu. Josh Childress, and Hakim Warrick were also recruited to join the Suns. Not long after the season began, Türkoğlu, Richardson, and Earl Clark were traded to Orlando for Vince Carter, Marcin Gortat, and Mickaël Piétrus, while rising star Goran Dragić was traded to the Houston Rockets for Aaron Brooks. The Suns had difficulty being even a .500 team, and for the second time since Nash returned to Phoenix, the Suns failed to make the 2011 playoffs.

==== 2011–12 season ====
In February 2012, Nash was named to his eighth All-Star Game. At the time, he was leading the NBA in assists per game. On 21 April 2012, Nash passed Oscar Robertson for career assists versus the Denver Nuggets. Despite his stellar play the Suns missed the 2012 playoffs for the second consecutive time. He finished the season averaging 12.5 points and 10.7 assists per game on 53.2% shooting from the field (tying his career high). Near the end of the 2011–12 season, Nash was named the winner of the PBWA's Magic Johnson Award.

=== Los Angeles Lakers (2012–2015) ===
==== 2012–13 season ====
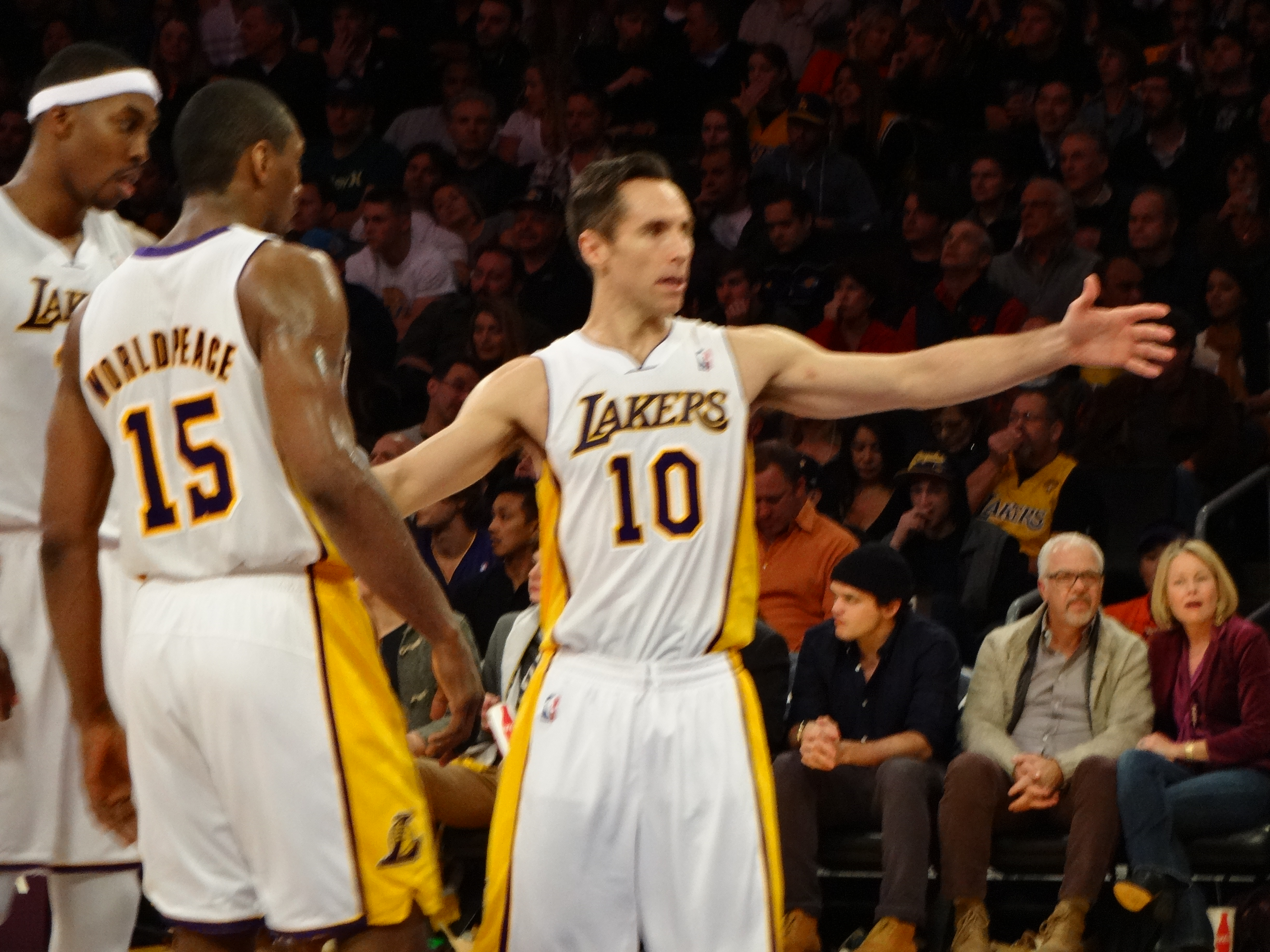
Nash with the Lakers

On 11 July 2012, the Los Angeles Lakers acquired Nash in a sign-and-trade deal with Phoenix, signing him to a three-year, $27 million contract. Nash also considered signing with New York or Toronto, but he decided that Los Angeles was the best fit for him and his family. Nash switched his jersey number, as his customary No. 13 was retired by Los Angeles in honour of Wilt Chamberlain. Nash, an avid soccer fan, chose No. 10 to pay homage to Glenn Hoddle, Zinedine Zidane, Lionel Messi and other soccer playmakers who wore the number. Entering his 17th NBA season, Nash came to the Lakers with concerns over his defense and the health of his back.

In the second game of the 2012–13 season, Nash suffered a non-displaced fracture in his left leg after a collision with Damian Lillard of the Portland Trail Blazers. He was expected to miss at least one week, but was out of the lineup for close to seven weeks. He was reunited with D'Antoni, who took over as Lakers coach after Mike Brown was fired after a 1–4 start. On 22 December, Nash returned against the Golden State Warriors, helping the Lakers win their first overtime game of the season, 118–115, scoring 12 points with 9 assists in 41 minutes of play. The Lakers won three of the first four games after Nash returned. However, they lost their next four, including a 125–112 loss to Houston on 8 January 2013, when Nash assisted on an Antawn Jamison jumper to become the fifth player in NBA history to reach 10,000 career assists.

Kobe Bryant was moved to defend the opponent's primary ball handler, freeing Nash from unfavourable matchups. Nash also struggled with Dwight Howard to run the pick and roll, a play that D'Antoni had expected would be a staple for the Lakers. D'Antoni moved Nash off the ball and made him more of a spot-up shooter, while Bryant became the primary facilitator on offense. Nash missed the last eight games of the season with a right hip injury that had also caused nerve damage in his right hamstring. The team qualified for the playoffs as the seventh seed, but were swept 4–0 by San Antonio in the first round. Nash missed the last two games of the series after recurring issues with his hip and hamstring. In what he called arguably "the most frustrating" season of his career, Nash missed a career-high 32 games in the regular season, and averaged his fewest assists (6.7) since 1999–2000, when he was a part-time starter with Dallas.

==== 2013–14 season ====
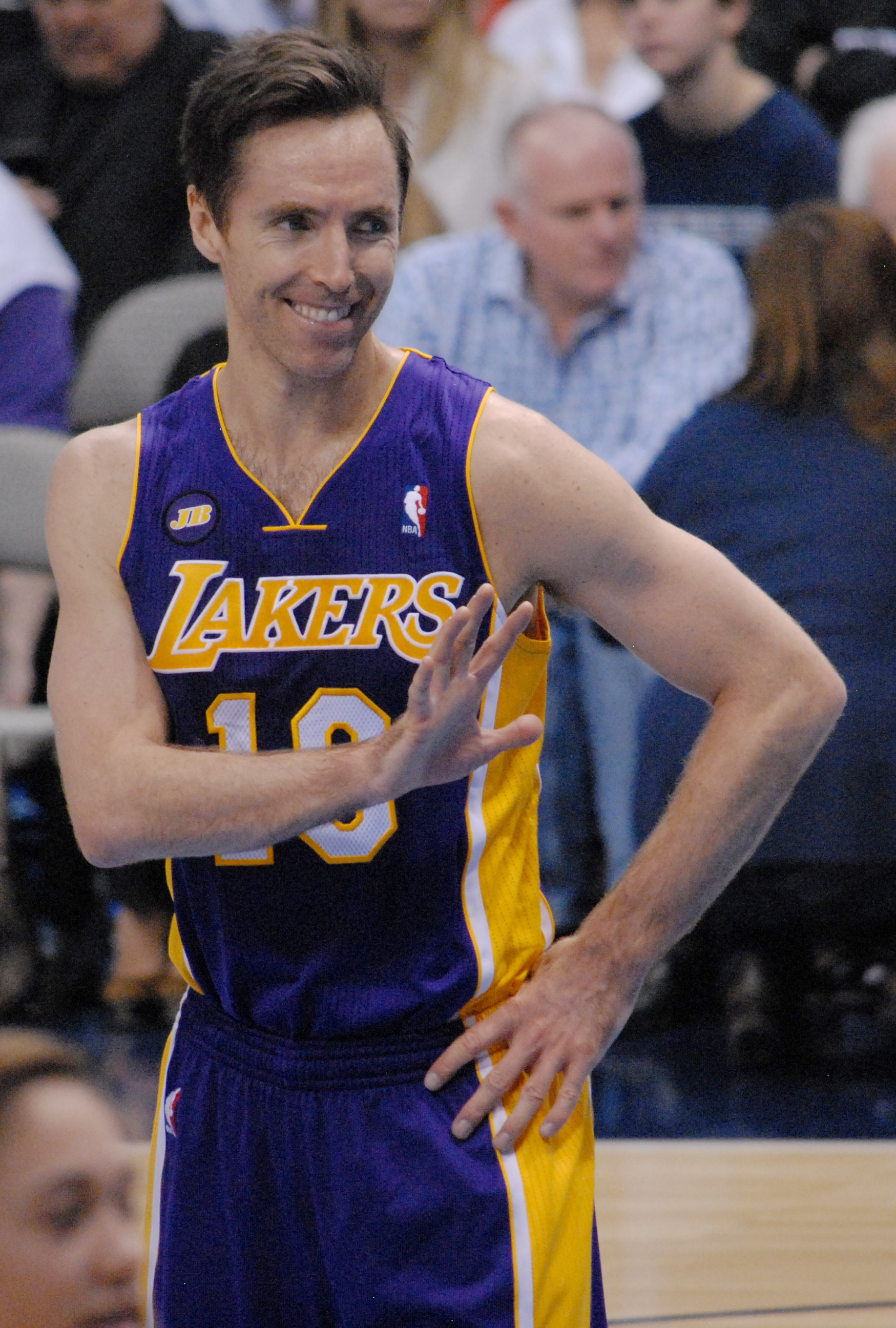
Nash with the Lakers in 2013

During the 2013–14 season, Nash continued to suffer nerve problems stemming from his leg injury the prior season. In November 2013, he was sidelined for an estimated minimum of two weeks due to nerve root irritation. Nash returned on 4 February 2014, shooting 3-for-6 for 7 points. On 7 February 2014, his 40th birthday, he scored a season-high 19 points in a victory over the Philadelphia 76ers. On 13 March, Nash was ruled out for the remainder of the season by D'Antoni. He was suffering from a recurrence of nerve problems stemming from an earlier collision to his left leg with Chicago's Kirk Hinrich, and the Lakers wanted to give Kendall Marshall and Jordan Farmar more playing time. However, Nash returned on 21 March after a groin injury to Farmar that was expected to sideline him a minimum of two weeks.

==== 2014–15 season ====
In July 2014, Nash announced that the 2014–15 season would be his last. During the preseason, he experienced back pain, and further aggravated his back while lifting luggage. On 23 October, less than a week before the start of what would have been the 40-year-old Nash's 19th year in the NBA, he was ruled out for the season due to a recurring back injury. Nash only played in three preseason games before he started to feel more pain in his back. Nash spoke on injuring his back, stating: "Being on the court this season has been my top priority, and it is disappointing to not be able to do that right now. I work very hard to stay healthy, and unfortunately my recent setback makes performing at full capacity difficult. I will continue to support my team during this period of rest and will focus on my long-term health."

=== Retirement ===
Nash announced his retirement from playing on 21 March 2015. Before the announcement, the Cleveland Cavaliers told Nash's agent that they were interested in having him as a backup for Kyrie Irving if Nash asked for a buyout. Nash refused due to health concerns and his wanting to retire as a Laker in gratitude for the opportunity given by the club. Nash was later approached by another former team of his, the Dallas Mavericks, to have one last season with them instead, but he declined due to his aforementioned health concerns.

== Post-playing career ==
=== Consulting duties ===
On 25 September 2015, it was confirmed that Nash would take on part-time consulting duties for the Golden State Warriors. During his first season with the team, the Warriors produced a record-breaking 73–9 season, although the team fell short in the 2016 NBA Finals to the Cleveland Cavaliers. The next season, the Warriors would win the 2017 NBA Finals against the defending champions Cleveland Cavaliers, giving Nash his first NBA championship in any role.

On 19 December 2017, the Naismith Basketball Hall of Fame announced that eligibility for induction into the Hall of Fame was decreased to three years after retirement, which allowed for Nash to be eligible to be enshrined in 2018. On 31 March 2018, during the Final Four, it was announced that Nash – along with former teammates Jason Kidd and Grant Hill, as well as Ray Allen, Maurice Cheeks, and Charlie Scott – would be inducted into the Basketball Hall of Fame in 2018. Nash was formally inducted into the Basketball Hall of Fame on 7 September 2018. In October 2021, Nash was honored as one of the league's greatest players of all time by being named to the NBA 75th Anniversary Team.

=== Coaching career ===
==== Brooklyn Nets (2020–2022) ====
On 3 September 2020, Nash was announced as head coach of the Brooklyn Nets.

On 3 March 2021, Nash was named Eastern Conference Coach of the Month for February, becoming the first Nets head coach to earn the honor since his former teammate Jason Kidd won it twice in 2014. Nash led the Nets to an Eastern Conference-best record of 9–4 during the month, including a conference-best 5–2 road record. Nash led the Nets to a 48–24 record in his first season as head coach. After the 2020–21 regular season, Nash finished in sixth place in the NBA Coach of the Year voting.

On 27 October 2022, Nash received two technical fouls and was ejected for arguing with and yelling at referees, during a 110–99 loss to the Milwaukee Bucks. On 1 November, Nash and the Nets agreed to part ways amid controversies revolving around the team's players.

==== Phoenix Suns (2025–present) ====
On 22 September 2025, Nash rejoined the Phoenix Suns organization as a senior advisor for the 2025–26 NBA season.

=== Podcasting and broadcasting ===
In 2025, Nash joined LeBron James as a co-host on the second season of the basketball podcast Mind the Game. Shortly thereafter, Nash was announced to join Amazon Prime's NBA coverage beginning in the 2025–26 NBA season.

== National team career ==
In the early 1990s, Nash was cut from the Canadian junior national team by head coach Ken Olynyk, the father of future NBA player Kelly Olynyk. At age 17, he was the youngest member of Team Canada at the 1991 Summer Universiade, where the team won a silver medal.

In 1993, while in college, he played for the senior national team at the Tournament of the Americas and competed in the Canada Games (for the British Columbia team) and Summer Universiade. He won a bronze medal at the Canada Games and won a silver medal at the Summer Universiade, losing to Team USA in a closely contested final, which included players such as Michael Finley and Damon Stoudamire.

At the 1999 Tournament of the Americas, Nash led Canada to the silver medal, qualifying the team for the Olympics for the first time in 12 years; he was named tournament MVP. At the 2000 Sydney Olympics, Nash led Canada to win their round robin group with a victory over Spain and a stunning 83–75 win over favoured Yugoslavia when he scored 26 points with eight rebounds and eight assists. Canada was eliminated in the quarterfinals with a five-point loss to France and Nash left the court in tears. Nash expressed disappointment with the result, saying "It hurts a lot. I feel like I let everybody down. We could have been in the championship game. We were good enough." Nevertheless, he did see a possible silver lining, saying "Hopefully kids [in Canada] will be inspired to play ... that's what I really hope." A victory in its final game of the tournament, a placement game against Russia, enabled Canada to salvage seventh place. Nash's Olympic performance propelled him to stardom in Canada, and he finished fifth in voting for the 2000 Lionel Conacher Award, which is handed out to the Canadian male athlete of the year.

Nash again led Team Canada during qualifying for the 2004 Summer Olympics at the FIBA Americas Olympic Qualifying Tournament in San Juan, Puerto Rico. He led the tournament in assists and was named tournament MVP, but Canada finished fourth, missing out on the three Olympic spots available. That was the last time Nash played for Canada; he was reportedly upset about the firing of head coach Jay Triano in 2004. In December 2007, he said, "In my mind right now, I'm not going to play for Canada any more."

On 8 May 2012, Nash became general manager of the Canadian senior national team. Three months later, he rehired Triano as head coach.

On 5 March 2019, Nash transitioned to a senior advisor role and was succeeded as general manager by Rowan Barrett, his former national team teammate.

== Player profile ==
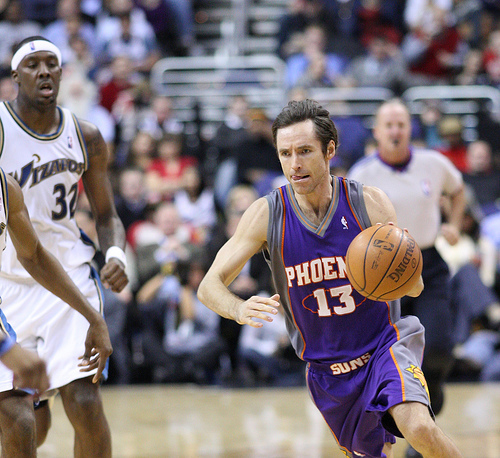
Nash is known for his dribbling, passing, and shooting abilities.

Nash was praised for his playmaking, ball-handling skills and shooting. He led the league in assists for five years, averaging 11.5 assists per game in 2004–05, 10.5 in 2005–06, 11.6 in 2006–07, 11.0 in 2009–10 and 11.4 in 2010–11 and won the NBA Skills Challenge in 2005 and 2010. As of the end of 2012–13 season, he had a 90.4% career free throw shooting average (formerly the best in NBA history, as of 2013 second to Stephen Curry) and a 42.8% career three-point shooting average (eighth-best in league history), and ranked as one of the top 10 players in league history in total assists, assists per game, and three-point field goals made. He is ranked second (starting from the 1986–87 season) in regular season point–assist double doubles. In the 2005–06 season, Nash became the fourth player in NBA history to shoot 50% or better from the field, 40% from three-point range (43.9), and 90% from the line, joining Larry Bird, Reggie Miller, and Mark Price in the 50–40–90 club. Nash would repeat this feat three more times in the 2007–08, 2008–09 and 2009–10 campaigns. Nash (four times), Larry Bird and Kevin Durant (two times each) are the only players to have accomplished this feat more than once.

A two-time NBA MVP, Nash is one of three point guards (along with Magic Johnson and Stephen Curry) to win the MVP award multiple times and one of four guards in NBA history to earn back-to-back MVPs (along with Johnson, Michael Jordan and Curry). Only 13 other NBA players have won back-to-back MVP awards: Johnson, Jordan, Bill Russell, Wilt Chamberlain, Kareem Abdul-Jabbar, Moses Malone, Larry Bird, Tim Duncan, LeBron James, Stephen Curry, Giannis Antetokounmpo, Nikola Jokić, and Shai Gilgeous-Alexander. On 12 January 2016, ESPN.com rated Nash as the seventh-best point guard of all time, and in a survey by nba.com in 2007, Nash received 85% of the votes by the league's general managers as best point guard in the league. In a similar survey in 2009, Nash was rated as the best passer and the player possessing the best basketball IQ.

Commenting on Nash losing out to former teammate Dirk Nowitzki for the 2007 NBA MVP, Boston Celtics centre and Hall of Famer Russell stated: "I think, on the world stage, he's one of our great athletes in all sports ... I'm a big fan. The two MVPs he got, he deserved. Part of the reason he's so good and so effective is that the guys like playing with him. He creates an atmosphere where they win games."

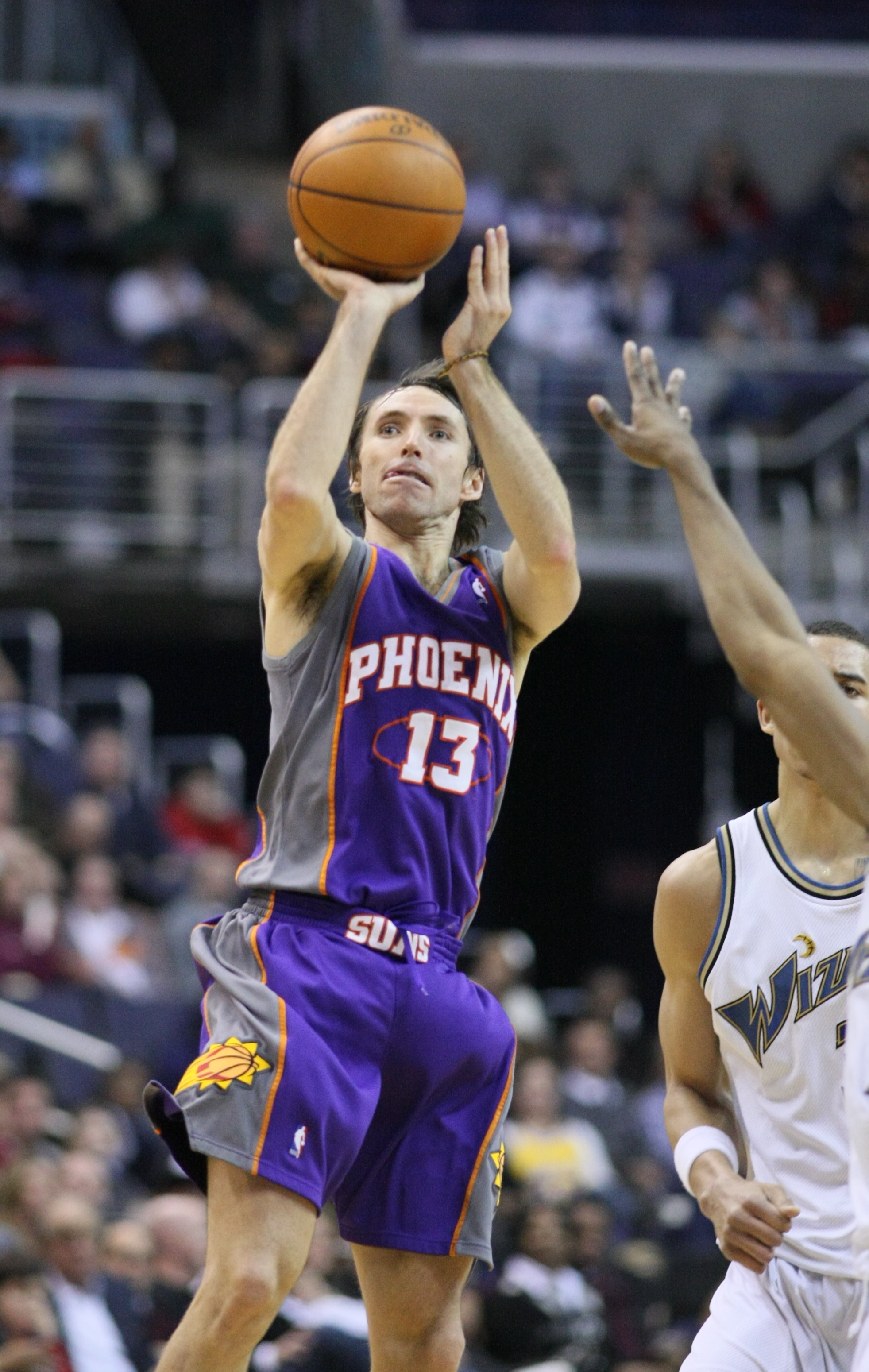
Nash takes a jump shot while with the Suns. He is considered one of the best shooters in NBA history.

Nash was particularly effective playing the pick and roll, especially with Nowitzki when he was with the Mavericks and later with the Suns' Amar'e Stoudemire and Shawn Marion under head coach Mike D'Antoni. When Nash returned to Phoenix in 2004, he helped the Suns improve from a 29–53 record in 2003–04 to 62–20 in 2004–05, reaching the conference finals for the first time in 11 years, and earning his first MVP award. The next season, he again led the Suns to the conference finals, despite the injuries of all three big men (Stoudemire, Kurt Thomas, and Brian Grant). Further, Nash was responsible for seven of his teammates attaining career-highs in season scoring. With Nash operating at the point between the 2005–06 and 2009–10 seasons, the Suns led the league in field goal percentage. In 2021, to commemorate the NBA's 75th Anniversary The Athletic ranked their top 75 players of all time, and named Nash as the 38th greatest player in NBA history.

== Career statistics ==
Legend
GP	Games played	GS	Games started	MPG	Minutes per game
FG%	Field goal percentage	3P%	3-point field goal percentage	FT%	Free throw percentage
RPG	Rebounds per game	APG	Assists per game	SPG	Steals per game
BPG	Blocks per game	PPG	Points per game	**Bold**	Career high
*	Led the league

=== NBA ===
==== Regular season ====
Year	Team	GP	GS	MPG	FG%	3P%	FT%	RPG	APG	SPG	BPG	PPG
1996–97	Phoenix	65	2	10.5	.423	.418	.824	1.0	2.1	.3	.0	3.3
1997–98	Phoenix	76	9	21.9	.459	.415	.860	2.1	3.4	.8	.1	9.1
1998–99	Dallas	40	40	31.7	.363	.374	.826	2.9	5.5	.9	.1	7.9
1999–00	Dallas	56	27	27.4	.477	.403	.882	2.2	4.9	.7	.1	8.6
2000–01	Dallas	70	70	34.1	.487	.406	.895	3.2	7.3	**1.0**	.1	15.6
2001–02	Dallas	**82**	**82**	34.6	.483	.455	.887	3.1	7.7	.6	.0	17.9
2002–03	Dallas	**82**	**82***	33.1	.465	.413	.909	2.9	7.3	**1.0**	.1	17.7
2003–04	Dallas	78	78	33.5	.470	.405	.916	3.0	8.8	.9	.1	14.5
2004–05	Phoenix	75	75	34.3	.502	.431	.887	3.3	11.5*	**1.0**	.1	15.5
2005–06	Phoenix	79	79	**35.4**	.512	.439	.921*	**4.2**	10.5*	.8	**.2**	**18.8**
2006–07	Phoenix	76	76	35.3	**.532**	.455	.899	3.5	**11.6***	.8	.1	18.6
2007–08	Phoenix	81	81	34.3	.504	**.470**	.906	3.5	11.1	.7	.1	16.9
2008–09	Phoenix	74	74	33.6	.503	.439	.933	3.0	9.7	.7	.1	15.7
2009–10	Phoenix	81	81	32.8	.507	.426	**.938***	3.3	11.0*	.5	.1	16.5
2010–11	Phoenix	75	75	33.3	.492	.395	.912	3.5	11.4*	.6	.1	14.7
2011–12	Phoenix	62	62	31.6	**.532**	.390	.894	3.0	10.7	.6	.1	12.5
2012–13	L.A. Lakers	50	50	32.5	.497	.438	.922	2.8	6.7	.6	.1	12.7
2013–14	L.A. Lakers	15	10	20.9	.383	.333	.917	1.9	5.7	.5	.1	6.8
Career		1,217	1,052	31.3	.490	.428	.904	3.0	8.5	.7	.1	14.3
All-Star		7	2	15.9	.429	.250	.000	2.0	6.7	.4	.1	3.7

==== Playoffs ====
Year	Team	GP	GS	MPG	FG%	3P%	FT%	RPG	APG	SPG	BPG	PPG
1997	Phoenix	4	0	3.8	.222	.250	.000	.3	.3	.3	**.3**	1.3
1998	Phoenix	4	1	12.8	.444	.200	.625	2.5	1.8	.5	.0	5.5
2001	Dallas	10	10	37.0	.417	.410	.882	3.2	6.4	.6	.1	13.6
2002	Dallas	8	8	40.4	.432	.444	.971	4.0	8.8	.5	.0	19.5
2003	Dallas	**20**	**20**	36.5	.447	**.487**	.873	3.5	7.3	**.9**	.1	16.1
2004	Dallas	5	5	39.4	.386	.375	.889	**5.2**	9.0	.8	.0	13.6
2005	Phoenix	15	15	**40.7**	**.520**	.389	.919	4.8	11.3	**.9**	.2	**23.9**
2006	Phoenix	**20**	**20**	39.9	.502	.368	.912	3.7	10.2	.4	**.3**	20.4
2007	Phoenix	11	11	37.5	.463	**.487**	.891	3.2	**13.3**	.4	.1	18.9
2008	Phoenix	5	5	36.6	.457	.300	.917	2.8	7.8	.4	.2	16.2
2010	Phoenix	16	16	33.7	.518	.380	.893	3.3	10.1	.3	.1	17.8
2013	L.A. Lakers	2	2	30.5	.435	.000	**1.000**	2.5	4.5	.0	.0	12.5
Career		120	113	35.7	.473	.406	.900	3.5	8.8	.6	.1	17.3

=== College ===
Year	Team	GP	GS	MPG	FG%	3P%	FT%	RPG	APG	SPG	BPG	PPG
1992–93	Santa Clara	**31**	—	24.0	.424	.408	.825	2.5	2.2	.8	**.1**	8.1
1993–94	Santa Clara	26	23	29.9	.414	.399	.831	2.5	3.7	1.3	.0	14.6
1994–95	Santa Clara	27	27	33.4	**.444**	**.454**	.879	**3.8**	**6.4**	**1.8**	**.1**	**20.9**
1995–96	Santa Clara	29	—	**33.8**	.430	.344	**.894**	3.6	6.0	1.3	.0	17.0
Career		113	—	30.1	.430	.401	.867	3.1	4.5	1.3	.1	14.9

== Head coaching record ==
Legend
Regular season	G	Games coached	W	Games won	L	Games lost	W–L %	Win–loss %
Playoffs	PG	Playoff games	PW	Playoff wins	PL	Playoff losses	PW–L %	Playoff win–loss %

Team	Year	G	W	L	W–L%	Finish	PG	PW	PL	PW–L%	Result
Brooklyn	2020–21	72	48	24	.667	2nd in Atlantic	12	7	5	.583	Lost in conference semifinals
Brooklyn	2021–22	82	44	38	.537	4th in Atlantic	4	0	4	.000	Lost in first round
Brooklyn	2022–23	7	2	5	.286	(fired)	—	—	—	—	—
Career		161	94	67	.584		16	7	9	.438	

== Awards and achievements ==
NBA

- 2× NBA Most Valuable Player: 2005, 2006
- 8× NBA All-Star: 2002, 2003, 2005–2008, 2010, 2012
- 7× All-NBA selection:
  - First team: 2005–2007
  - Second team: 2008, 2010
  - Third team: 2002, 2003
- 2× NBA Skills Challenge winner: 2005, 2010
- 5× NBA regular season leader for assists per game: 2005 (11.5), 2006 (10.5), 2007 (11.6), 2010 (11.0), 2011 (11.4)
- 6× NBA regular season leader for total assists: 2005 (861), 2006 (826), 2007 (884), 2010 (892), 2011 (855), 2012 (664)
- 7× NBA regular season leader for assists per 48 minutes: 2004 (12.6), 2005 (16.1), 2006 (14.2), 2007 (15.8), 2008 (15.5), 2010 (16.1), 2011 (16.4)
- 2× NBA regular season leader for free throw percentage: 2006 (.921), 2010 (.938)
- 4× member of 50–40–90 club: 2006, 2008–2010
  - Has more 50–40–90 seasons than any other player in NBA history
  - One of only ten players to have ever shot 50–40–90
  - One of only three players (the others being Larry Bird and Kevin Durant) to have shot 50–40–90 more than once
- J. Walter Kennedy Citizenship Award: 2007
- Magic Johnson Award: 2012
- Second-highest career free throw percentage in NBA history (minimum 1,200 career attempts), 90.42 percent
- Phoenix Suns Ring of Honor
- NBA 75th Anniversary Team

Other

- Lou Marsh Trophy: 2005
- 3× Lionel Conacher Award: 2002, 2005, 2006
- Order of Sport, inducted into Canada's Sports Hall of Fame in 2020–21

== Sports ownership ==
Nash had also previously made statements about his intention to bring Major League Soccer to Vancouver as early as 2011, which he has succeeded in doing. He joined the USL-1's Vancouver Whitecaps team's ownership group in July 2008, and in March 2009, Vancouver was officially named as a future MLS expansion city, set to join the league in 2011. Nash occasionally attends practice for his co-owned team, called Vancouver Whitecaps FC.

Nash, along with former Yahoo! president and fellow Victoria-native Jeff Mallett, were investors in Women's Professional Soccer, a soccer league that was launched in March 2009 and folded in May 2012. Nash cited his twin daughters and wanting to have role models for them to look up to as a reason for supporting the league.

On 5 January 2016, it was announced that Nash was part of a group who purchased a $21 million stake in Segunda División club Mallorca. The group also included Phoenix Suns owner Robert Sarver, Suns vice chairman Andy Kohlberg and former players of the United States national soccer team Stuart Holden and Kyle Martino.

On 21 June 2021, Nash along with Wayne Gretzky, Dustin Johnson and Brooklyn Nets owner Joe Tsai became owners in the National Lacrosse League's new Las Vegas franchise, the Las Vegas Desert Dogs.

== Off the court ==
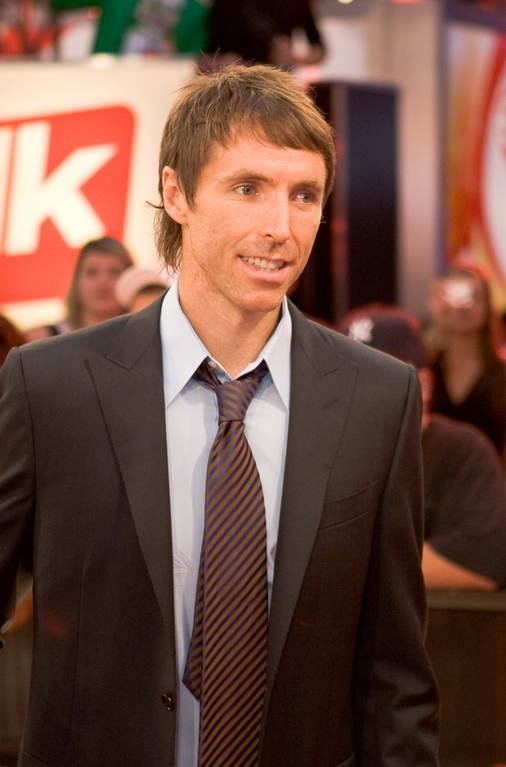
Nash at the 2008 eTalk Festival Party, during the Toronto International Film Festival

=== Personal life ===
In 2001, Nash met Alejandra Amarilla in New York City. They married in June 2005 and had twin daughters and a son. On the day of his son's birth, Nash made a statement to Life & Style in which he announced the birth but called it a "bittersweet moment", revealing that he and his wife had "lived separately for the past several months" and were "in the process of dissolving" their marriage. In March 2016, Nash became engaged to Lilla Frederick, a former Pepperdine University and junior women's U.S. team volleyball player. They married in September 2016. The couple have a son and a daughter.

In 2006, Nash was referenced in Canadian singer Nelly Furtado's song "Promiscuous", leading him to deny rumours that they were romantically involved. They both grew up in British Columbia.

Nash's younger brother, Martin, played soccer for the Vancouver Whitecaps and made 30 appearances for the Canadian national soccer team. Their younger sister, Joann, was the captain of the University of Victoria Vikes women's soccer team for three years and was named a Canada West Universities Athletic Association All-Star. She is married to former professional ice hockey player Manny Malhotra, who in June 2026 was named the head coach for the Vancouver Canucks. Nash is the godfather of Toronto Raptors star RJ Barrett.

Nash has a medical condition called spondylolisthesis, which causes muscle tightness and back pain. Due to the condition, when he was on the sidelines in basketball games, he would lie on his back rather than sit on the bench to keep his muscles from stiffening.

=== Charity ===
In 2001, Nash founded the Steve Nash Foundation. Through grants to public service and nonprofit entities, the foundation aims to foster health in kids by funding projects that provide services to children affected by poverty, illness, abuse, or neglect, and create opportunities for education, play, and empowerment. It focuses its resources on communities in Arizona and British Columbia, and was given charitable status in 2004. The foundation was awarded the Steve Patterson Award for Excellence in Sports Philanthropy in 2008. Nash also founded the Jim Jennings Memorial Endowment Fund, established in honour of a volunteer staff member at Santa Clara University who served the basketball team for more than 20 years.

Elsewhere, Nash sponsors the Steve Nash Youth Basketball League in British Columbia, which has grown over 10,000 participants. He also became involved with GuluWalk, a Canadian-operated charitable organization that raises awareness and funds for the war-affected children of northern Uganda. In September 2007, Nash and Yao Ming headlined a group of NBA players who travelled to China and played an exhibition game with the Chinese national basketball team. The charity event reportedly raised 2.5 million dollars, earmarked for Chinese children in need.

In May 2006, Nash was named by Time as one of the 100 most influential people in the world. In the accompanying write-up by Charles Barkley, Nash was lauded for his unselfishness on the basketball court, and being "just a nice guy" who had paid for a new pediatric cardiology ward in a Paraguayan hospital. On 28 December 2007, it was announced that Nash would receive Canada's highest civilian honour, the Order of Canada, and on 3 June 2008, it was announced that Nash would receive a star on Canada's Walk of Fame. On 18 September 2009, he was awarded an honorary Doctor of Laws degree from the University of Victoria for his athletic achievements and philanthropic work on the behalf of young people through the Steve Nash Foundation.

=== Endorsements ===
Nash is selective in his endorsements, preferring companies he deems socially responsible. After winning his first MVP award, he was approached to serve as spokesperson for numerous products, including MDG Computers, Raymond Weil watches, Vitamin Water, and Clearly Canadian bottled water. He also has a longstanding relationship with Nike. Nash is represented by agent Bill Duffy.

=== Soccer ===
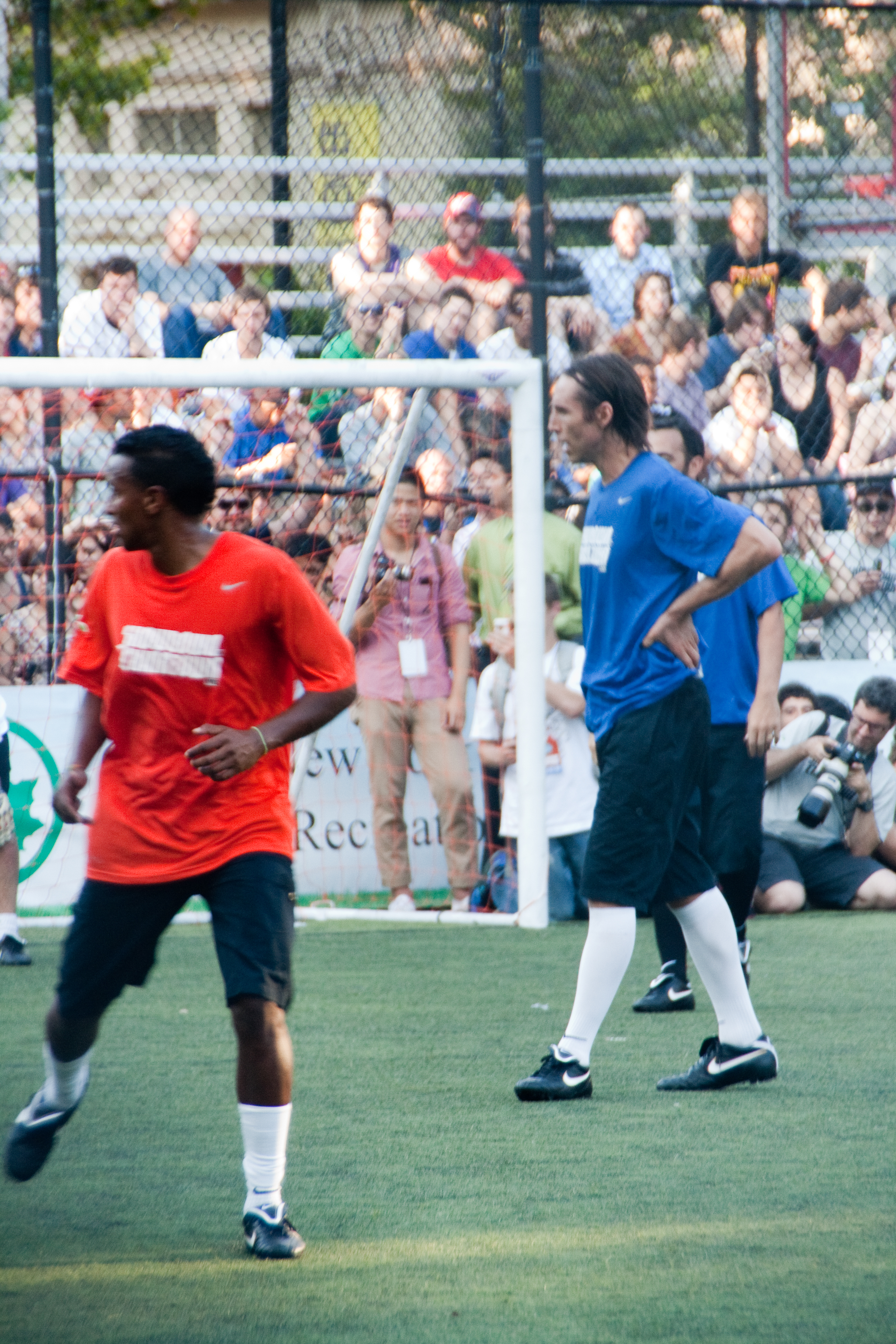
Nash contemplated a soccer career before deciding to focus on basketball full-time.

Nash grew up playing soccer—he stated in a 2005 interview that he could have played professionally if he had focused on it—and continues to hold an interest in the sport. When Dirk Nowitzki arrived in the NBA from Germany, he and Nash became close friends, in part because they enjoyed watching soccer together. Nash is friends with several professional soccer players, including Alessandro Del Piero, Thierry Henry, Owen Hargreaves, Massimo Ambrosini and Steve McManaman. During his off-season, when he lives in New York City, he has trained with the New York Red Bulls of Major League Soccer, and once tried to arrange a pick-up game in the city's Central Park with the Red Bulls and one of his local teams.

Nash, whose father was born in the Tottenham district of London, is a lifelong Tottenham Hotspur supporter, and has expressed interest in owning a minority stake in the club. "I'd like to be an owner. It's something I could do for the rest of my life after my little window of popularity dies", he said in an interview with The New York Times. Nash added, "I've been a passionate supporter all my life. My parents are from north London and so it's not like I'm some Yank who wants to make a profit out of football. I don't care about making money. I just want to see Spurs succeed and, if I can help, that's great." However, he said any participation in Spurs would come after his basketball career is over, and he has had only "casual contact" with chairman Daniel Levy and former director of football Damien Comolli. Nash is also a fan of Spain's Barcelona, and Brazilian team Sport Club Corinthians Paulista, which his former Suns teammate Leandro Barbosa supports. When Barbosa visited Corinthians in 2007, the club gave him a shirt with Nash's name and jersey number.

Nash also co-hosted Showdown in Chinatown in 2008, an 8-on-8 charity soccer game held at Sara D. Roosevelt Park. He scored two goals in his team's 8–5 victory. Participants included Thierry Henry, Jason Kidd, Baron Davis and Suns teammates Raja Bell and Leandro Barbosa.

In July 2013, Nash participated in a training session with the Italian soccer club Inter Milan at the New York Red Bulls' facilities in New Jersey. He also trained with the New York Cosmos B of the American fourth-division National Premier Soccer League in 2015.

In 2023, Nash took part in The Soccer Tournament as a guest of Como.

=== Other interests ===
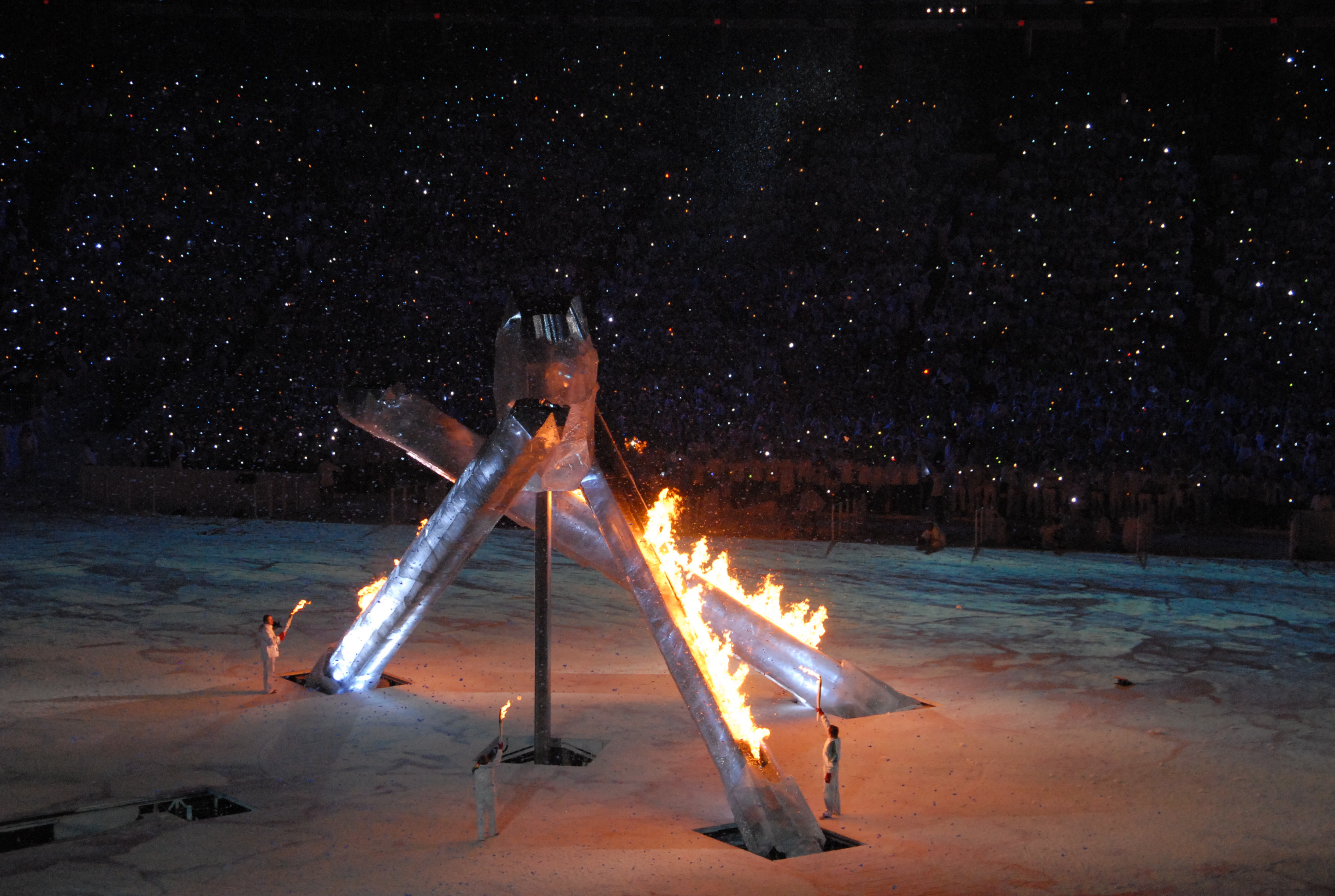
Nash, Wayne Gretzky, Nancy Greene, and Catriona Le May Doan participate in the lighting of the Olympic cauldron at the 2010 Winter Olympics

Nash and a Montreal-based partner, Leonard Schlemm, opened the first Steve Nash Sports Club in the spring of 2007 in downtown Vancouver, a high-end, $5 million, 38,500-square-foot (3,580 m^{2}) facility that will mirror Nash's own fitness philosophy.

In 2007, Nash wrote and produced an 81-second commercial for Nike titled "Training Day", directed by Julian Schnabel's daughter Lola, which gained popularity as a viral video on YouTube. Nash also started a film production company together with his cousin, filmmaker Ezra Holland, and intends to produce independent films. The first creative effort to come from Meathawk was a 91-second commercial, titled "The Sixty Million Dollar Man", for Nike's eco-friendly Trash Talk shoe, the first high-performance shoe to be made—at the behest of the environmentally conscious Nash—from recycled materials. Nash has worn the shoe since February 2008, but Nike produced only 5,000 pairs for sale. The ad, which broke virally on Earth Day 2008, was written by Nash and the directors of the spot, Danny Vaia and Ezra Holland. It is a spoof remake of the title sequence of the American television series The Six Million Dollar Man and plays on Nash's numerous on-court collisions. Amar'e Stoudemire and Raja Bell have cameo appearances. Nash and Holland also co-directed the documentary Into the Wind, about iconic Canadian athlete and activist Terry Fox, as part of ESPN's 30 for 30 series. In October 2013, Nash appeared in the music video for "City of Angels" by Thirty Seconds to Mars. In 2013, Nash was one of the recipients of the Top 25 Canadian Immigrant Awards presented by Canadian Immigrant magazine.

At the 2010 Winter Olympics in Vancouver, Nash became the first NBA player in Olympic history to carry the torch and light the Olympic cauldron.

Nash is also known for his outspoken political views. He was an early and public opponent of the 2003 Iraq War, wearing a custom-made T-shirt to the 2003 NBA All-Star Game that stated: "No war – Shoot for peace." Although Nash did get positive support from teammate Nick Van Exel among others, he also drew criticism from David Robinson, a former Naval officer and fellow NBA player as well as commentators like Skip Bayless who criticized Nash as being uninformed and advised him to "just shut up and play." Nash has also been critical of Arizona's SB1070 legislation, which seeks to aggressively address illegal immigration, as he felt "the law obviously can target opportunities for racial profiling." In August 2017, Nash was critical of President Donald Trump in the aftermath of the 2017 Unite the Right rally, saying that "to defend white supremacists and then slang his shitty ass grape juice pretty much sums the man up," referring to a winery Donald Trump has in Charlottesville, Virginia.

== See also ==
- List of Canadians in the National Basketball Association
- List of foreign NBA players
- List of National Basketball Association career assists leaders
- List of National Basketball Association career turnovers leaders
- List of National Basketball Association career 3-point scoring leaders
- List of National Basketball Association career 3-point field goal percentage leaders
- List of National Basketball Association career free throw percentage leaders
- List of National Basketball Association career games played leaders
- List of National Basketball Association career playoff assists leaders
- List of National Basketball Association career playoff turnovers leaders
- List of National Basketball Association career playoff 3-point scoring leaders
- List of National Basketball Association players with most assists in a game
- List of National Basketball Association retired numbers
- List of oldest and youngest National Basketball Association players

Olympic Games
Preceded by Li Ning	Final Olympic torchbearer Vancouver 2010; With: Catriona Le May Doan, Nancy Greene and Wayne Gretzky	Succeeded by Callum Airlie, Jordan Duckitt, Desiree Henry, Katie Kirk, Cameron MacRitchie, Aidan Reynolds, and Adelle Tracey
Preceded by Stefania Belmondo	Final Winter Olympic torchbearer Vancouver 2010; With: Catriona Le May Doan, Nancy Greene and Wayne Gretzky	Succeeded by Irina Rodnina and Vladislav Tretiak
