= 1992–93 Pepperdine Waves men's basketball team =

American college basketball season

1992–93 Pepperdine Waves men's basketball

WCC Regular season champions

NIT Second Round
- Conference: West Coast Conference
- Record: 23–8 (11–3 WCC)
- Head coach: Tom Asbury (5th season)
- Home arena: Firestone Fieldhouse

1992–93 West Coast Conference men's basketball standings
| | Conf. | | | | Overall |
| Team | W | | L | PCT | W | | L | PCT |
|---|---|---|---|---|---|---|---|---|
| Pepperdine | 11 | – | 3 | .786 | 23 | – | 8 | .742 |
| Gonzaga | 10 | – | 4 | .714 | 19 | – | 9 | .679 |
| Santa Clara † | 9 | – | 5 | .643 | 19 | – | 12 | .613 |
| San Francisco | 8 | – | 6 | .571 | 19 | – | 12 | .613 |
| San Diego | 7 | – | 7 | .500 | 13 | – | 14 | .481 |
| Saint Mary's (CA) | 6 | – | 8 | .429 | 11 | – | 16 | .407 |
| Portland | 3 | – | 11 | .214 | 9 | – | 18 | .333 |
| Loyola Marymount | 2 | – | 12 | .143 | 7 | – | 20 | .259 |
† Conference tournament winner Rankings from AP poll

The 1992–93 Pepperdine Waves men's basketball team represented Pepperdine University in the 1992–93 NCAA Division I men's basketball season. The team was led by head coach Tom Asbury. The Waves played their home games at the Firestone Fieldhouse and were members of the West Coast Conference. They finished the season 23-8, 11-3 in WCC play and extended their winning streak to a WCC record 38 consecutive league games as well as win a third consecutive regular-season title. After ending "The Streak" the Waves would finish the season 6-2 before falling to Santa Clara in the West Coast Conference tournament championship game. With a third 20+ win season in three years Pepperdine received a bid to the NIT tournament. In the opening round the Waves defeated UC Santa Barbara 53-50 before falling to the USC in the second round.

== Roster ==
1992–93 Pepperdine Waves men's basketball team
Players
Coaches

| Pos. | # | Name | Height | Weight | Year | Previous school | Hometown |
|---|---|---|---|---|---|---|---|
| F | 10 | Steve Guild | 6 ft 6 in (1.98 m) | — | Sr | Marina | Huntington Beach, California |
| G | | Steve Clover | 6 ft 4 in (1.93 m) | — | Jr | Rolling Hills | Rancho Palos Verdes, California |
| G | 12 | Damin Lopez | 5 ft 9 in (1.75 m) | — | RS Jr | Apollo | Glendale, Arizona |
| G | | Mark Sterbens | 6 ft 1 in (1.85 m) | — | So |
| F | 21 | Dana Jones | 6 ft 7 in (2.01 m) | — | Jr | North Hollywood | Los Angeles, California |
| F | | Tabari Johnson | 6 ft 8 in (2.03 m) | — | Fr |
| C | | Gavin Van Der Putten | 7 ft 0 in (2.13 m) | — | Fr |
| F | 41 | Byron Jenson | 6 ft 7 in (2.01 m) | — | RS Sr | UTSA | Tucson, Arizona |
| C | 52 | Derek Noether | 6 ft 8 in (2.03 m) | — | Jr | Clovis West | Fresno, California |
| G | | Bryan Parker | 6 ft 2 in (1.88 m) | — | Jr |
| F | | LeRoi O'Brien | 6 ft 7 in (2.01 m) | — | So |
| G | | Jamal Lawrence | 6 ft 2 in (1.88 m) | — | Fr |

Head coach

- Tom Asbury (Wyoming)

Assistant coach(es)

Legend

- (C) Team captain
- (S) Suspended
- (I) Ineligible
- (W) Walk-on
- Injured
- Current redshirt

== Schedule and results ==
| Date time, TV | Rank^{#} | Opponent^{#} | Result | Record | Site (attendance) city, state |
Non-conference regular season
| Dec 1, 1992* | | at Texas Tech | L 69–72 | 0–1 | Lubbock Municipal Coliseum; Lubbock, Texas |
| Dec 5, 1992* | | Sonoma State | W 89–64 | 1–1 | Firestone Fieldhouse; Malibu, California |
| Dec 11, 1992* | | Charlotte 49ers | W 65–56 | 2–1 | Charlotte Coliseum (II); Charlotte, North Carolina |
| Dec 14, 1992* | | UC Santa Barbara | L 55–60 | 2–2 | Firestone Fieldhouse; Malibu, California |
| Dec 18, 1992* | | Montana | W 68–58 | 3–2 | Adams Center/Dahlberg Arena; Missoula, Montana |
| Dec 21, 1992* | | at Boise State | W 92–88 | 4–2 | BSU Pavilion; Boise, Idaho |
| Dec 23, 1992* | | George Washington | W 81–79 | 5–2 | Firestone Fieldhouse; Malibu, California |
| Dec 29, 1992* | | vs. Georgia State | W 79–60 | 6–2 | Chattanooga, Tennessee |
| Dec 30, 1992* | | vs. Chattanooga | L 67–80 | 6–3 | Chattanooga, Tennessee |
| Jan 2, 1993* | | Drexel | W 69–56 | 7–3 | Firestone Fieldhouse; Malibu, California |
| Jan 5, 1993* | | Quincy College | W 90–60 | 8–3 | Firestone Fieldhouse; Malibu, California |
| Jan 9, 1993* | | Oral Roberts | W 116–76 | 9–3 | Firestone Fieldhouse; Malibu, California |
WCC Regular Season
| Jan 15, 1993 | | Gonzaga | W 67–66 | 10–3 (1–0) | Firestone Fieldhouse; Malibu, California |
| Jan 16, 1993 | | Portland | W 80–69 | 11–3 (2–0) | Firestone Fieldhouse; Malibu, California |
| Jan 22, 1993 | | at San Francisco | W 71–66 | 12–3 (3–0) | Sobrato Center; San Francisco, California |
| Jan 23, 1993 | | at Saint Mary's | W 54–46 | 13–3 (4–0) | McKeon Pavilion; Moraga, California |
| Jan 29, 1993 | | Saint Mary's | W 65–53 | 14–3 (5–0) | Firestone Fieldhouse; Malibu, California |
| Jan 30, 1993 | | San Francisco | L 72–75 | 14–4 (5–1) | Firestone Fieldhouse; Malibu, California |
| Feb 4, 1993 | | at Santa Clara | W 73–71 ^{2OT} | 15–4 (6–1) | Leavey Center; Santa Clara, California |
| Feb 6, 1993 | | at San Diego | W 76–64 | 16–4 (7–1) | Jenny Craig Pavilion; San Diego, California |
| Feb 12, 1993 | | San Diego | W 61–57 ^{OT} | 17–4 (8–1) | Firestone Fieldhouse; Malibu, California |
| Feb 13, 1993 | | Santa Clara | L 58–63 | 17–5 (8–2) | Firestone Fieldhouse; Malibu, California |
| Feb 17, 1993 | | at Loyola Marymount | W 78–66 | 18–5 (9–2) | Gersten Pavilion; Los Angeles, California |
| Feb 20, 1993 | | Loyola Marymount | W 80–54 | 19–5 (10–2) | Firestone Fieldhouse; Malibu, California |
| Feb 25, 1993 | | at Portland | W 67–49 | 20–5 (11–2) | Chiles Center; Portland, Oregon |
| Feb 27, 1993 | | at Gonzaga | L 52–63 | 20–6 (11–3) | The Kennel; Spokane, Washington |
WCC tournament
| Mar 6, 1993* | | Loyola Marymount; WCC Tournament Quarterfinal | W 80–66 | 21–6 | Sobrato Center; San Francisco, California |
| Mar 7, 1993* | | at San Francisco; WCC Tournament Semifinal | W 88–67 | 22–6 | Sobrato Center; San Francisco, California |
| Mar 8, 1993* | | vs. Santa Clara; WCC Tournament Championship | L 63–73 | 22–7 | Sobrato Center; San Francisco, California |
NIT tournament
| Mar 19, 1993* | | vs. UC Santa Barbara; First Round | W 53–50 | 23–7 | The Thunderdome; Santa Barbara, California |
| Mar 22, 1993* | | vs. USC; Second Round | L 59–71 | 23–8 | L.A. Sports Arena; Los Angeles, California |
*Non-conference game. ^{#}Rankings from AP Poll. (#) Tournament seedings in parentheses. MW=Midwest.
