= 1992–93 Gonzaga Bulldogs men's basketball team =

American college basketball season

1992–93 Gonzaga Bulldogs men's basketball
- Conference: West Coast Conference
- Record: 19–9 (10–4 WCC)
- Head coach: Dan Fitzgerald (11th season)
- Assistant coaches: Dan Monson (5th season); Mark Few (4th season); Bill Grier (2nd season)
- Home arena: Charlotte Y. Martin Centre

1992–93 West Coast Conference men's basketball standings
	Conf.				Overall
Team	W		L	PCT	W		L	PCT
Pepperdine	11	–	3	.786	23	–	8	.742
Gonzaga	10	–	4	.714	19	–	9	.679
Santa Clara †	9	–	5	.643	19	–	12	.613
San Francisco	8	–	6	.571	19	–	12	.613
San Diego	7	–	7	.500	13	–	14	.481
Saint Mary's (CA)	6	–	8	.429	11	–	16	.407
Portland	3	–	11	.214	9	–	18	.333
Loyola Marymount	2	–	12	.143	7	–	20	.259
† Conference tournament winner Rankings from AP poll

The 1992–93 Gonzaga Bulldogs men's basketball team represented Gonzaga University in the West Coast Conference (WCC) during the 1992–93 NCAA Division I men's basketball season. Led by eleventh-year head coach Dan Fitzgerald, the Bulldogs were 18–8 (.692) overall in the regular season (10–4 in WCC, second), and played their home games on campus at the Charlotte Y. Martin Centre in Spokane, Washington.

Gonzaga advanced to the semifinals of the WCC tournament at San Francisco, but lost to third seed and eventual champion Santa Clara to finish at 19–9 (.679).

== Postseason results ==
Date time, TV	Rank^{#}	Opponent^{#}	Result	Record	Site (attendance) city, state
WCC tournament
Sat, March 6; 6:05 pm	(2)	vs. (7) Portland; Quarterfinal	W 77–57	19–8	War Memorial Gymnasium; San Francisco, California
Sun, March 7	(2)	vs. (3) Santa Clara; Semifinal	L 51–53	19–9	War Memorial Gymnasium; San Francisco, California
*Non-conference game. ^{#}Rankings from AP poll. (#) Tournament seedings in parentheses. All times are in Pacific time.
