= Dick Davey =

Retired American college basketball coach

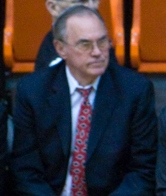
- Davey in 2010

Biographical details
- Born: April 5, 1942 (age 84); San Francisco, California, U.S.

Playing career
- 1961–1964: Pacific

Coaching career (HC unless noted)
- 1967–1972: Leland HS (CA)
- 1972–1977: California (assistant)
- 1977–1992: Santa Clara (assistant)
- 1992–2007: Santa Clara
- 2008–2012: Stanford (assoc. HC)

Head coaching record
- Overall: 251–190 (.569) (college)

Accomplishments and honors

Championships
- 3 WCC regular season (1995–1997); WCC tournament (1993)

Awards
- 4× WCC Coach of the Year (1993, 1995, 1997, 2007)

Richard James Davey Jr. (born April 5, 1942) is an American retired college basketball coach. Davey is best known for being head men's basketball coach at Santa Clara University from 1992 to 2007. Most recently, Davey was the associate head men's basketball coach at Stanford University under head coach Johnny Dawkins from 2008 to 2012 and helped Stanford win the 2012 National Invitation Tournament.

== Early life, education, and baseball career ==
Born in San Francisco, Davey grew up in Ceres, California. His father, also named Dick Davey, played college basketball at Modesto Junior College and the University of San Francisco and was later a basketball coach at Ceres Union High School. At Ceres Union High, Davey played on three sports teams as a football quarterback, basketball guard, and baseball catcher.

After graduating from Ceres Union in 1960, Davey attended the College of the Pacific (later University of the Pacific) in Stockton, playing on the varsity basketball team at guard from 1961 to 1964 and varsity baseball from 1962 to 1964. Under head coach Dick Edwards in 1963–64, Davey averaged 9.0 points and 4.5 rebounds in 26 games on a 15–11 Pacific Tigers men's basketball team. On the Pacific Tigers baseball team, Davey earned All-West Coast Athletic Conference honors in 1963 and 1964. Davey graduated from Pacific with a Bachelor of Arts in education in 1964.

After graduating, Davey played minor league baseball in the San Francisco Giants farm system as a catcher and outfielder, for the Decatur Commodores in 1964 and Magic Valley Cowboys in 1965. Davey played 60 games in his minor league baseball career, batting .172 with 23 RBI. Davey retired from baseball due to an injury.

== Coaching career ==
=== Early coaching career (1964–1977) ===
Davey's coaching career unexpectedly began in grad school when he was charged with starting the University of Pacific Men's soccer team. Davey's response was that "he didn't know a soccer ball from a ping-pong" ball but he'd give it his best effort. Over the next three years, without any scholarships and virtually no budget, Davey built a team that went 15-12, defeated perennial power Santa Clara University, and gave City College of San Francisco its third loss in seven seasons. In November 1966 Davey announced he wouldn't be returning and moved to his first love, basketball.

From 1967 to 1972, Davey was the head basketball coach at Leland High School in San Jose, California. Davey went 61–53 in five seasons at Leland, with a third-place finish in the 1971 Central Coast Section playoffs in his final season there. Reuniting with his former Pacific coach Dick Edwards, from 1972 to 1977, Davey was an assistant coach at the University of California, Berkeley under Edwards.

=== Santa Clara assistant coach (1977–1992) ===
Davey moved to Santa Clara University in 1977 and served as assistant to longtime Broncos head coach Carroll Williams. Davey would serve as Williams's top assistant for 15 years, during which Santa Clara had 10 winning seasons including six 20-win seasons. Santa Clara's most successful stretch in that era was in the 1980s with winning records in all but the 1985–86 season. The 1980s for Santa Clara also had four NIT appearances in 1984, 1985, 1988, and 1989 and an appearance in the 1987 NCAA tournament.

=== Santa Clara head coach (1992–2007) ===
On September 9, 1992, Davey was promoted to head coach after Williams became athletic director at Santa Clara. Before the season began, Davey headed to Victoria, B.C. Canada to watch an unheralded and virtually unknown guard, Steve Nash play at St. Michael's Academy. Davey says that he watched thirty seconds of warmups before worriedly looking around for other coaches. In a rather irregular recruiting tactic Davey told Nash's coach, loud enough so Nash could hear, "He might be one of the worst defenders I've ever seen." Nash still came to Santa Clara the next fall.

In his first season, Davey's Broncos finished third but won the WCC tournament and became a 15 seed. In what oddsmakers say is the fifth greatest upset in tournament history, Santa Clara became the second 15 seed to win in the first round, defeating an NBA laden number 2 seed Arizona 64–61 on March 18, 1993.

Led by future NBA MVP Steve Nash, Santa Clara would go on to win the West Coast Conference regular season title in 1995 and 1996 and qualified for the NCAA Tournament both years. Santa Clara signed Davey to a contract extension on March 29, 1995.

The 10-seed Broncos beat Maryland in the first round in 1996. After Nash moved on to the NBA, Santa Clara won a third straight WCC regular season title in 1997, this time led by senior guard Marlon Garnett.

Santa Clara would continue to have consistent winning seasons under Davey, with an 18–10 record in 1997–98, 19–12 in 1999–2000, and 20–12 in 2000–01. However, the program went on a downturn afterward going just 70-78 over the next five seasons.

On January 7, 2003, CollegeInsider.com named Davey the Mid-Season Coach of the Year for achieving a 9–4 start to the season with an injury-depleted roster where multiple walk-ons took over starting roles. Santa Clara would finish the 2002–03 season 13–15 (4–10 WCC) but improved to 16–16 (8–8 WCC) in 2003–04.

The 2004–05 Broncos started 3–1 following an upset of no. 4 and eventual national champion North Carolina on November 19 in the Pete Newell Challenge at The Arena in Oakland. However, Santa Clara finished the season 15–16 (7–7 WCC).

Davey reportedly retired as Santa Clara coach on February 1, 2007. However several media outlets including the San Francisco Chronicle reported that top university administrators and major donors wanted a new head coach and a larger basketball budget. In Santa Clara's next game on February 3 at Saint Mary's, Davey got a standing ovation from Saint Mary's fans and a gift argyle sweater from Saint Mary's head coach Randy Bennett, and Santa Clara won 63–57, resulting in sole possession of second place in WCC standings. Santa Clara finished in 2nd place in Davey's final season 21–10 (10–4 WCC) and Dick Davey earned his fourth and final coach of the year honors. Ken Pomeroy also ranked Santa Clara's defense as the best in the WCC that season. Davey's teams finished in the top 3 in the WCC nine times in his fifteen seasons at Santa Clara.

In late 2007, the authorized biography Dick Davey: A Basketball Life Richly Led was self-published by Chuck Hildebrand, sportswriter and friend of Davey.

=== Stanford associate head coach (2008–2012) ===
On June 16, 2008, Davey came out of retirement to become associate head coach at Stanford under new head coach Johnny Dawkins. Davey joked that during his interview with Dawkins, "I gave him a list of reasons why he shouldn’t hire me, including my age and the fact that I couldn’t turn a computer on."

Stanford finished the 2008–09 season with a 20–14 (6–12 Pac-10) record, with wins over ranked Arizona State and California teams and a third round 2009 College Basketball Invitational appearance. After two straight losing seasons, Stanford improved to 26–11 (10–8 Pac-12) with the 2012 NIT championship in 2011–12. Davey retired from Stanford after the NIT.

== Personal life ==
Davey is married to Jeanne Davey. They have two children, Kimberly Davey, a former professional ballet dancer, and Mike Davey, a longtime basketball head coach at Saratoga High School.

== Head coaching record ==
Record table
Season	Team	Overall	Conference	Standing	Postseason
Santa Clara Broncos (West Coast Conference) (1992–2007)
1992–93	Santa Clara	19–12	9–5	3rd	NCAA Division I Second Round
1993–94	Santa Clara	13–14	6–8	T–4th	
1994–95	Santa Clara	21–7	12–2	1st	NCAA Division I First Round
1995–96	Santa Clara	20–9	10–4	T–1st	NCAA Division I Second Round
1996–97	Santa Clara	16–11	10–4	T–1st	
1997–98	Santa Clara	18–10	8–6	3rd	
1998–99	Santa Clara	14–15	8–6	4th	
1999–00	Santa Clara	19–12	9–5	4th	
2000–01	Santa Clara	20–12	10–4	3rd	
2001–02	Santa Clara	13–15	8–6	3rd	
2002–03	Santa Clara	13–15	4–10	T–6th	
2003–04	Santa Clara	16–16	6–8	5th	
2004–05	Santa Clara	15–16	7–7	T–3rd	
2005–06	Santa Clara	13–16	5–9	T–6th	
2006–07	Santa Clara	21–10	10–4	2nd	
Santa Clara:		251–190 (.569)	122–88 (.581)		
Total:		251–190 (.569)			
National champion Postseason invitational champion Conference regular season champion Conference regular season and conference tournament champion Division regular season champion Division regular season and conference tournament champion Conference tournament champion
