= 1992–93 Santa Clara Broncos men's basketball team =

American college basketball season

1992–93 Santa Clara Broncos men's basketball

WCC tournament champions

NCAA tournament, Round of 32
- Conference: West Coast Conference
- Record: 19–12 (9–5 WCC)
- Head coach: Dick Davey (1st season)
- Assistant coaches: Larry Hauser; Steve Seandel
- Home arena: Toso Pavilion

1992–93 West Coast Conference men's basketball standings
	Conf.				Overall
Team	W		L	PCT	W		L	PCT
Pepperdine	11	–	3	.786	23	–	8	.742
Gonzaga	10	–	4	.714	19	–	9	.679
Santa Clara †	9	–	5	.643	19	–	12	.613
San Francisco	8	–	6	.571	19	–	12	.613
San Diego	7	–	7	.500	13	–	14	.481
Saint Mary's (CA)	6	–	8	.429	11	–	16	.407
Portland	3	–	11	.214	9	–	18	.333
Loyola Marymount	2	–	12	.143	7	–	20	.259
† Conference tournament winner Rankings from AP poll

The 1992–93 Santa Clara Broncos men's basketball team represented Santa Clara University as a member of the West Coast Conference during the 1992-93 Season. Led by head coach Dick Davey, the Broncos finished with a record of 19–12, and a WCC record of 9–5. The Broncos beat Saint Mary's, Gonzaga, and Pepperdine to win the West Coast Conference tournament, and received an automatic bid into the NCAA tournament. Santa Clara became just the second #15 seed to win a game in the NCAA Tournament, beating Arizona in the first round before losing to Temple in the round of 32. It would be the first of three NCAA Tournament appearances in a 4-year period for the Broncos.

== Roster ==
1992–93 Santa Clara Broncos men's basketball team
Players
Coaches

Pos.	#	Name	Height	Weight	Year	Previous school	Hometown
G	11	Steve Nash	6 ft 3 in (1.91 m)	175 lb (79 kg)	Fr	St. Michaels	Victoria, BC
G/F	12	Adam Anderson	6 ft 5 in (1.96 m)	—	Fr
G	20	Mark Schmitz	6 ft 4 in (1.93 m)	—	Sr
F	23	DeWayne Lewis	6 ft 5 in (1.96 m)	—	Jr
F	30	Jason Sedlock	6 ft 7 in (2.01 m)	—	Fr
C	31	Drew Zurek	6 ft 9 in (2.06 m)	—	Fr
C	33	Phil Von Buchwaldt	6 ft 11 in (2.11 m)	—	Fr
F	34	Kevin Dunne	6 ft 6 in (1.98 m)	—	Fr
F	41	Pete Eisenrich	6 ft 9 in (2.06 m)	—	Jr

Head coach

- Dick Davey (Pacific)

Assistant coach(es)

Legend

- (C) Team captain
- (S) Suspended
- (I) Ineligible
- (W) Walk-on
- Injured
- Current redshirt

== Schedule and results ==
Date time, TV	Rank^{#}	Opponent^{#}	Result	Record	Site city, state
Regular Season
Dec 1, 1992*		at San Jose State	W 71–56	1–0	The Event Center (2,150); San Jose, California
Dec 5, 1992*		at No. 16 UCLA	L 60–69	1–1	Pauley Pavilion (5,667); Los Angeles, California
Dec 11, 1992*		vs. Georgia; Cougar Classic	L 68–80	1–2	Marriott Center (5,506); Provo, Utah
Dec 12, 1992*		vs. Southern Utah; Cougar Classic	W 85–76	2–2	Marriott Center (6,028); Provo, Utah
Dec 15, 1992*		Nevada	W 81–68	3–2	Toso Pavilion (1,340); Santa Clara, California
Dec 17, 1992*		San Francisco State	W 89–57	4–2	Toso Pavilion (725); Santa Clara, California
Dec 20, 1992*		No. 25 California	L 73–80	4–3	Toso Pavilion (5,000); Santa Clara, California
Dec 23, 1992*		Minnesota	L 63–87	4–4	Toso Pavilion (1,438); Santa Clara, California
Dec 29, 1992*		vs. Harvard; Cable Car Classic	W 80–69	5–4	San Jose Arena (3,144); San Jose, California
Dec 30, 1992*		vs. Alabama; Cable Car Classic	L 58–65	5–5	San Jose Arena (3,648); San Jose, California
Jan 2, 1993*		at Stanford	L 35–66	5–6	Maples Pavilion (3,126); Stanford, California
Jan 5, 1993*		CS Stanislaus	W 93–80	6–6	Toso Pavilion (1,314); Santa Clara, California
Jan 9, 1993		San Diego	L 57–59	6–7 (0–1)	Toso Pavilion (1,760); Santa Clara, California
Jan 14, 1993		San Francisco	W 91–80	7–7 (1–1)	Toso Pavilion (3,028); Santa Clara, California
Jan 16, 1993		Saint Mary's	W 63–53	8–7 (2–1)	Toso Pavilion (4,062); Santa Clara, California
Jan 21, 1993		at Gonzaga	L 61–64	8–8 (2–2)	Charlotte Y. Martin Centre (3,221); Spokane, Washington
Jan 23, 1993		at Portland	W 77–74	9–8 (3–2)	Chiles Center (1,550); Portland, Oregon
Jan 30, 1993		at San Diego	L 62–63	9–9 (3–3)	USD Sports Center (2,079); San Diego, California
Feb 4, 1993		Pepperdine	L 71–73	9–10 (3–4)	Toso Pavilion (2,750); Santa Clara, California
Feb 6, 1993		Loyola Marymount	W 80–57	10–10 (4–4)	Toso Pavilion (4,018); Santa Clara, California
Feb 12, 1993		at Loyola Marymount	W 71–62	11–10 (5–4)	Gersten Pavilion (1,907); Los Angeles, California
Feb 13, 1993		at Pepperdine	W 63–58	12–10 (6–4)	Firestone Fieldhouse (2,439); Malibu, California
Feb 18, 1993		Portland	W 66–60	13–10 (7–4)	Toso Pavilion (1,752); Santa Clara, California
Feb 20, 1993		Gonzaga	W 58–56	14–10 (8–4)	Toso Pavilion (4,066); Santa Clara, California
Feb 26, 1993		at Saint Mary's	L 57–58	14–11 (8–5)	McKeon Pavilion (3,392); Moraga, California
Feb 27, 1993		at San Francisco	W 77–76	15–11 (9–5)	War Memorial Gymnasium (4,764); San Francisco, California
WCC Tournament
Mar 6, 1993*	(3)	vs. (6) Saint Mary's; Quarterfinals	W 79–68	16–11	War Memorial Gymnasium (3,182); San Francisco, California
Mar 7, 1993*	(3)	vs. (2) Gonzaga; Semifinals	W 53–51	17–11	War Memorial Gymnasium (3,992); San Francisco, California
Mar 8, 1993*	(3)	vs. (1) Pepperdine; Championship	W 73–63	18–11	War Memorial Gymnasium (4,029); San Francisco, California
NCAA Tournament
Mar 18, 1993*	(15 W)	vs. (2 W) No. 5 Arizona; First Round	W 64–61	19–11	Jon M. Huntsman Center; Salt Lake City, Utah
Mar 20, 1993*	(15 W)	vs. (7 W) Temple; Second Round	L 57–68	19–12	Jon M. Huntsman Center; Salt Lake City, Utah
*Non-conference game. ^{#}Rankings from AP Poll. (#) Tournament seedings in parentheses.
