= LSU New Orleans Privateers men's basketball statistical leaders =

The LSU New Orleans Privateers men's basketball statistical leaders are individual statistical leaders of the LSU New Orleans Privateers men's basketball program in various categories, including points, assists, blocks, rebounds, and steals. Within those areas, the lists identify single-game, single-season, and career leaders. The Privateers represent LSU New Orleans (LSUNO) in the NCAA Division I Southland Conference.

LSU New Orleans began competing in intercollegiate basketball in 1969 under that athletic identity, when the school was known as "Louisiana State University in New Orleans". In 1974, the institutional name changed to "University of New Orleans", with the athletic brand changing to "New Orleans". In July 2026, the university name and athletic identity changed again to the current "LSU New Orleans", coinciding with the school's return to the Louisiana State University System. The NCAA did not officially record assists as a stat until the 1983–84 season, and blocks and steals until the 1985–86 season, but LSUNO's record books includes players in these stats before these seasons. These lists are updated through the end of the 2025–26 season.

== Scoring ==
Career
Rk	Player	Points	Seasons
1	Bo McCalebb	2,679	2003–04 2004–05 2005–06 2006–07 2007–08
2	Mel Henderson	1,900	1969–70 1970–71 1971–72 1972–73
3	Troy Green	1,824	2017–18 2018–19 2019–20 2020–21 2021–22
4	Ervin Johnson	1,608	1989–90 1990–91 1991–92 1992–93
5	Nate Mills	1,549	1974–75 1975–76 1976–77 1977–78
6	Melvin Simon	1,507	1990–91 1991–92 1992–93 1993–94
7	Tory Walker	1,358	1997–98 1998–99 1999–00 2000–01
	Ledell Eackles	1,358	1986–87 1987–88
9	Christavious Gill	1,356	2013–14 2014–15 2015–16 2016–17
10	Wilbur Holland	1,346	1973–74 1974–75

Season
Rk	Player	Points	Season
1	Bo McCalebb	776	2006–07
2	Wilbur Holland	756	1974–75
3	John Hamilton	743	1971–72
4	Bo McCalebb	742	2007–08
5	Ledell Eackles	726	1987–88
6	Butch Webster	695	1970–71
7	Jordan Johnson	683	2023–24
8	Bo McCalebb	679	2004–05
9	Ledell Eackles	632	1986–87
10	Derek St. Hilaire	624	2021–22

Single game
Rk	Player	Points	Season	Opponent
1	Butch Webster	48	1970–71	Ball State
2	Ledell Eackles	45	1987–88	FIU
3	Butch Webster	43	1970–71	Samford
	Butch Webster	43	1970–71	Sam Houston State
5	Wilbur Holland	42	1974–75	Wabash
6	Jordan Johnson	40	2023–24	Texas A&M-Corpus Christi
	Jamie McNeilly	40	2006–07	Denver
	Mel Henderson	40	1972–73	Illinois State
9	Jordan Johnson	39	2022–23	Houston Christian
	Bo McCalebb	39	2006–07	North Texas
	Wilbur Holland	39	1973–74	Louisiana-Monroe
	John Hamilton	39	1971–72	SIU-Edwardsville
	Butch Webster	39	1969–70	Missouri-St. Louis
	Butch Webster	39	1969–70	Missouri-St. Louis
	Butch Webster	39	1969–70	Nicholls

== Rebounds ==
Career
Rk	Player	Rebounds	Seasons
1	Ervin Johnson	1,287	1989–90 1990–91 1991–92 1992–93
2	Melvin Simon	941	1990–91 1991–92 1992–93 1993–94
3	Wayne Cooper	920	1974–75 1975–76 1976–77 1977–78
4	Mel Henderson	785	1969–70 1970–71 1971–72 1972–73
5	Ardith Wearren	783	1974–75 1975–76 1976–77 1977–78
6	Travin Thibodeaux	677	2014–15 2015–16 2016–17 2017–18
7	Sam Jones	676	1984–85 1985–86 1986–87 1987–88
8	John Harris	674	1981–82 1982–83 1983–84 1984–85
9	Kevin Hill	673	2012–13 2013–14 2014–15 2015–16
10	Oscar Taylor	629	1980–81 1981–82 1982–83

Season
Rk	Player	Rebounds	Season
1	C.B. Gordon	382	1971–72
2	Ervin Johnson	367	1990–91
3	Ervin Johnson	356	1991–92
4	Melvin Simon	355	1993–94
5	Ervin Johnson	346	1992–93
6	Wayne Cooper	343	1977–78
7	Butch Webster	332	1970–71
8	Hector Romero	302	2001–02
9	Ronnie Grandison	292	1986–87
10	Wayne Cooper	281	1976–77

Single game
Rk	Player	Rebounds	Season	Opponent
1	Ervin Johnson	27	1992–93	Lamar
2	Lloyd Terry	25	1978–79	Georgia State
	Mel Henderson	25	1971–72	Georgia State
	Butch Webster	25	1969–70	Nicholls
5	Ervin Johnson	24	1992–93	Jacksonville
6	Ervin Johnson	23	1992–93	Texas-Pan American
	Gary Hyatt	23	1971–72	Georgia State
8	Melvin Simon	22	1993–94	Lamar
	Ervin Johnson	22	1990–91	Lamar
	Wayne Cooper	22	1977–78	Dayton
	Mel Henderson	22	1971–72	SIU-Edwardsville

== Assists ==
Career
Rk	Player	Assists	Seasons
1	Gabe Corchiani	456	1984–85 1985–86 1986–87 1987–88
2	Terry Gill	442	1971–72 1972–73 1973–74
3	Jordan Crump	403	1973–74 1974–75 1975–76 1976–77 1977–78
4	A.J. Meredith	391	2000–01 2001–02 2002–03 2003–04
5	Troy Green	385	2017–18 2018–19 2019–20 2020–21 2021–22
6	Bo McCalebb	378	2003–04 2004–05 2005–06 2006–07 2007–08
7	Nate Mills	364	1974–75 1975–76 1976–77 1977–78
8	Jamie McNeilly	354	2004–05 2005–06 2006–07
9	Duane Reboul	307	1969–70 1970–71
10	Corey Brown	280	1994–95 1995–96 1996–97 1997–98

Season
Rk	Player	Assists	Season
1	Jakevion Buckley	179	2025–26
2	Jimmie Smith	178	1994–95
3	Rarlensee Nelson	172	2012–13
4	Duane Reboul	171	1970–71
5	Terry Gill	167	1971–72
6	Jordan Crump	166	1974–75
7	Jamie McNeilly	164	2005–06
8	Brandon Knight	150	2011–12
9	Terry Gill	148	1973–74
10	Lamont Thornton	143	1988–89

Single game
Rk	Player	Assists	Season	Opponent
1	Jordan Crump	18	1974–75	Savannah State
2	JR Jacobs	16	2024–25	Stephen F. Austin
3	Jordan Crump	15	1974–75	Wabash
	Jordan Crump	15	1974–75	Northern Kentucky
	Terry Gill	15	1972–73	Centenary
6	Rarlensee Nelson	14	2012–13	Bethune-Cookman
	Duane Reboul	14	1969–70	Spring Hill
8	Duane Reboul	13	1969–70	Nicholls
	Jakevion Buckley	13	2025–26	SE Louisiana
10	Jakevion Buckley	12	2025–26	Tulane
	JR Jacobs	12	2024–25	Troy
	Jimmie Smith	12	1994–95	South Alabama
	Eugene Washington	12	1983–84	Louisiana
	Mitch Shuler	12	1979–80	UAB
	Jordan Crump	12	1974–75	Marian
	Terry Gill	12	1973–74	Lewis
	Duane Reboul	12	1970–71	Louisiana

== Steals ==
Career
Rk	Player	Steals	Seasons
1	Bo McCalebb	250	2003–04 2004–05 2005–06 2006–07 2007–08
2	Troy Green	193	2017–18 2018–19 2019–20 2020–21 2021–22
3	Gabe Corchiani	178	1984–85 1985–86 1986–87 1987–88
4	Christavious Gill	169	2013–14 2014–15 2015–16 2016–17
5	James Parlow	147	2004–05 2005–06 2006–07 2007–08
6	Tory Walker	133	1997–98 1998–99 1999–00 2000–01
7	Travin Thibodeaux	132	2014–15 2015–16 2016–17 2017–18
8	Sam Jones	131	1984–85 1985–86 1986–87 1987–88
9	Nate Frye	128	2013–14 2014–15 2015–16 2016–17
10	Ronnie Grandison	115	1985–86 1986–87

Season
Rk	Player	Steals	Season
1	Bo McCalebb	76	2007–08
2	Ronnie Grandison	66	1986–87
3	Bo McCalebb	62	2006–07
	Ben Adams	62	2000–01
5	Troy Green	60	2021–22
6	Gabe Corchiani	59	1987–88
7	Derek St. Hilaire	57	2021–22
	Christavious Gill	57	2015–16
	Johnell Smith	57	2002–03
10	James Parlow	55	2005–06
	Bo McCalebb	55	2004–05
	Jakevion Buckley	55	2025–26

Single game
Rk	Player	Steals	Season	Opponent
1	Generra Varmall	9	2011–12	Rice
2	Khaleb Wilson-Rouse	8	2023–24	Central Arkansas
	Ben Adams	8	2000–01	Loyola (N.O.)
4	Nate Frye	7	2014–15	Southern Illinois
	Corey Blake	7	2012–13	Southern Illinois
	Ben Adams	7	2000–01	Lipscomb
	Cass Clarke	7	1990–91	U.S. International
9	Jakevion Buckley	6	2025–26	Nicholls
	Troy Green	6	2021–22	Nicholls
	Troy Green	6	2019–20	Nicholls
	Travin Thibodeaux	6	2016–17	Florida College
	James Parlow	6	2006–07	Denver
	Jamie McNeilly	6	2006–07	North Texas
	Johnell Smith	6	2002–03	Louisiana
	Johnell Smith	6	2002–03	Jacksonville
	Johnell Smith	6	2002–03	Rollins
	Kyle Smith	6	2000–01	Tulane
	Tory Walker	6	1998–99	TCU
	Kris Stoneking	6	1997–98	Southern
	Kwan Johnson	6	1996–97	Little Rock
	Tyrone Garris	6	1995–96	San Francisco
	Tyrone Garris	6	1994–95	Northern Iowa
	Reggie Garrett	6	1992–93	Texas State
	Darren Laiche	6	1991–92	Oklahoma State
	Ervin Johnson	6	1989–90	James Madison
	Ronnie Grandison	6	1986–87	Northwestern State
	Mike Smith	6	1985–86	Memphis
	Oscar Taylor	6	1981–82	Southern Miss
	Tim Owens	6	1980–81	Jackson State
	Nate Mills	6	1977–78	Furman
	Nate Mills	6	1976–77	McNeese State

== Blocks ==
Career
Rk	Player	Blocks	Seasons
1	Ervin Johnson	294	1989–90 1990–91 1991–92 1992–93
2	Michael McDonald	221	1992–93 1993–94 1994–95
3	Tory Walker	132	1997–98 1998–99 1999–00 2000–01
4	Oscar Taylor	100	1980–81 1981–82 1982–83
5	Melvin Simon	91	1990–91 1991–92 1992–93 1993–94
6	Travin Thibodeaux	87	2014–15 2015–16 2016–17 2017–18
7	Mark Petteway	84	1980–81 1981–82 1982–83
8	Kevin Hill	80	2012–13 2013–14 2014–15 2015–16
	Nathaniel Parker	80	2003–04 2004–05 2005–06
10	Sydney Rice	73	1989–90 1990–91 1991–92
	Mike Smith	73	1985–86 1986–87 1987–88
	Wayne Cooper	73	1974–75 1975–76 1976–77 1977–78

Season
Rk	Player	Blocks	Season
1	Michael McDonald	96	1993–94
2	Ervin Johnson	81	1991–92
3	Michael McDonald	80	1994–95
4	Ervin Johnson	77	1992–93
5	Ervin Johnson	74	1990–91
6	Wayne Cooper	73	1976–77
7	Ervin Johnson	62	1989–90
8	Churchill Abass	57	2025–26
9	Michael McDonald	45	1992–93
10	Nathaniel Parker	44	2003–04

Single game
Rk	Player	Blocks	Season	Opponent
1	Ervin Johnson	12	1992–93	Texas A&M
2	Michael McDonald	9	1994–95	Arkansas State
	Michael McDonald	9	1993–94	Loyola (N.O.)
4	Michael McDonald	8	1993–94	Texas-Pan American
	Ervin Johnson	8	1990–91	Louisiana Tech
	Ardith Wearren	8	1976–77	South Florida
7	Kevin Hill	7	2013–14	Texas A&M-Corpus Christi
	Michael McDonald	7	1993–94	Texas-Pan American
	Wayne Cooper	7	1977–78	Charlotte
10	Tim Tillman	6	2006–07	Middle Tennessee
	Churchill Abass	6	2025–26	Stephen F. Austin
