= 1992 Midwestern Collegiate Conference men's basketball tournament =

- Classification: Division I
- Season: 1991–92
- Teams: 8
- Site: Riverfront Coliseum; Cincinnati, Ohio
- Champions: Evansville (2nd title)
- Winning coach: Jim Crews (1st title)
- MVP: Parrish Casebier (Evansville)

1991–92 Midwestern Collegiate Conference men's basketball standings
	Conf.				Overall
Team	W		L	PCT	W		L	PCT
Evansville †	8	–	2	.800	24	–	6	.800
Xavier	7	–	3	.700	15	–	12	.556
Butler	7	–	3	.700	21	–	10	.677
Dayton	5	–	5	.500	15	–	15	.500
Loyola (IL)	2	–	8	.200	13	–	16	.448
Detroit Mercy	1	–	9	.100	12	–	17	.414
† 1992 MCC tournament winner Rankings from AP Poll

The 1992 Midwestern Collegiate Conference men's basketball tournament (now known as the Horizon League men's basketball tournament) was held March 12–14 at Riverfront Coliseum in Cincinnati, Ohio.

Evansville defeated Butler in the championship game, 95–76, to win their second MCC/Horizon League men's basketball tournament title.

The Purple Aces received an automatic bid to the 1992 NCAA tournament as the #8 seed in the Midwest region.

== Format ==
All six conference members participated in the tournament and were seeded based on regular season conference records.

== Bracket ==
Quarterfinals; Friday, March 12
4	Dayton	73
5	Loyola-Chicago	83
3	Butler	87
6	Detroit	70

Semifinals; Saturday, March 13
1	Evansville	64
5	Loyola-Chicago	49
3	Butler	78
2	Xavier	61

Championship; Sunday, March 14
1	Evansville	95
3	Butler	76
