= 1992–93 Evansville Purple Aces men's basketball team =

American college basketball season

1992–93 Evansville Purple Aces men's basketball

MCC Regular season co-champions MCC tournament champions

NCAA tournament, first round
- Conference: Midwestern Collegiate Conference
- Record: 23–7 (12–2 MCC)
- Head coach: Jim Crews
- Home arena: Roberts Municipal Stadium

1992–93 Midwestern Collegiate Conference men's basketball standings
	Conf.				Overall
Team	W		L	PCT	W		L	PCT
Xavier	12	–	2	.857	24	–	6	.800
Evansville †	12	–	2	.857	23	–	7	.767
La Salle	9	–	5	.643	14	–	13	.519
Detroit Mercy	7	–	7	.500	15	–	12	.556
Duquesne	5	–	9	.357	13	–	15	.464
Butler	5	–	9	.357	11	–	17	.393
Dayton	3	–	11	.214	4	–	26	.133
Loyola (IL)	3	–	11	.214	7	–	20	.259
† 1993 MCC tournament winner

The 1992–93 Evansville Purple Aces men's basketball team represented the University of Evansville in the 1992–93 NCAA Division I men's basketball season. Their head coach was Jim Crews and they played their home games at Roberts Municipal Stadium as members of the Midwestern Collegiate Conference. After finishing in a tie for the MCC regular season championship, the Purple Aces won the MCC tournament to receive an automatic bid to the 1993 NCAA tournament. They were defeated by Florida State in the opening round and finished 23–7 (12–2 MCC).

== Roster ==
1992–93 Evansville Purple Aces men's basketball team
Players	Coaches
Pos. / # / Name / Height / Weight / Year / Hometown; PF / / Parrish Casebier / 6 ft 4 in (1.93 m) / 205 lb (93 kg) / Jr / Rockport, IN	Head coach: Jim Crews (Indiana); Assistant coach(es) Legend: (C) Team captain; (S) Suspended; (I) Ineligible; (W) Walk-on; Injured; Current redshirt

== Schedule ==
Date time, TV	Rank^{#}	Opponent^{#}	Result	Record	Site (attendance) city, state
Regular season
Dec 1, 1992*		Missouri–Rolla	W 82–73	1–0	Roberts Municipal Stadium; Evansville, Indiana
Dec 6, 1992*		at Notre Dame	L 70–76	1–1	Joyce Center; Notre Dame, Indiana
Dec 9, 1992*		at Valparaiso	W 84–77	2–1	Athletics-Recreation Center; Valparaiso, Indiana
Dec 12, 1992*		Illinois State	W 86–67	3–1	Roberts Municipal Stadium (11,679); Evansville, Indiana
Dec 14, 1992*		at Indiana State	L 55–58	3–2	Hulman Center; Terre Haute, Indiana
Mar 7, 1993		Loyola–Chicago	W 62–44	20–6 (12–2)	Roberts Municipal Stadium; Evansville, Indiana
MCC tournament
Mar 11, 1993*		vs. Dayton; Championship	W 69–66	21–6	Market Square Arena; Indianapolis, Indiana
Mar 12, 1993*		vs. Butler; Semifinals	W 74–71	22–6	Market Square Arena; Indianapolis, Indiana
Mar 13, 1993*		vs. No. 22 Xavier; Championship game	W 80–69	23–6	Market Square Arena; Indianapolis, Indiana
NCAA tournament
Mar 18, 1993*	(14 SE)	vs. (3 SE) No. 11 Florida State; First Round	L 70–82	23–7	Orlando Arena; Orlando, Florida
*Non-conference game. ^{#}Rankings from AP poll. (#) Tournament seedings in parentheses. MW=Midwest. All times are in Central Standard Time.
