= 1992–93 New Orleans Privateers men's basketball team =

American college basketball season

1992–93 New Orleans Privateers men's basketball

Sun Belt Regular season champion

NCAA tournament
- Conference: Sun Belt Conference

Ranking
- AP: No. 17
- Record: 26–4 (18–0 Sun Belt)
- Head coach: Tim Floyd (5th season)
- Home arena: Lakefront Arena

1992–93 Sun Belt Conference men's basketball standings
	Conf.				Overall
Team	W		L	PCT	W		L	PCT
No. 17 New Orleans	18	–	0	1.000	26	–	4	.867
No. 20 Western Kentucky †	14	–	4	.778	26	–	6	.813
SW Louisiana	11	–	7	.611	17	–	13	.567
Arkansas State	11	–	7	.611	16	–	12	.571
Arkansas-Little Rock	10	–	8	.556	15	–	12	.556
South Alabama	9	–	9	.500	15	–	13	.536
Lamar	9	–	9	.500	15	–	12	.556
Jacksonville	3	–	15	.167	5	–	22	.185
Louisiana Tech	3	–	15	.167	7	–	21	.250
Texas-Rio Grande Valley	2	–	16	.111	2	–	20	.091
† 1993 Sun Belt Conference tournament winner Rankings from AP Poll

The 1992–93 New Orleans Privateers men's basketball team represented the University of New Orleans during the 1992–93 NCAA Division I men's basketball season. The Privateers led by fifth-year head coach Tim Floyd, played their home games at Lakefront Arena and played as a member of the Sun Belt Conference. They finished the season 26–4 (18–0 Sun Belt), sweeping through the Sun Belt regular season. New Orleans lost in the championship game of the Sun Belt Conference tournament, but received a bid to the NCAA tournament as the No. 8 seed in the Midwest region. The Privateers would lose in the opening round to No. 9 seed Xavier, 73–55.

== Roster ==
1992–93 New Orleans Privateers men's basketball team
Players
Coaches

Pos.	#	Name	Height	Weight	Year	Previous school	Hometown
F/C	21	Michael McDonald	6 ft 10 in (2.08 m)	220 lb (100 kg)	So	Utah Valley	Longview, Texas
G	22	Dedric Willoughby	6 ft 3 in (1.91 m)	170 lb (77 kg)	Fr	Archbishop Shaw	New Orleans, Louisiana
F	32	Melvin Simon	6 ft 8 in (2.03 m)	225 lb (102 kg)	Jr	Archbishop Shaw	Harvey, Louisiana
C	40	Ervin Johnson	6 ft 11 in (2.11 m)	235 lb (107 kg)	Sr	Block HS	Jonesville, Louisiana
G		Gerald Williams	5 ft 9 in (1.75 m)	—	Jr
G		Reggie Garrett	6 ft 5 in (1.96 m)	—	So
G		Reni Mason	5 ft 9 in (1.75 m)	—	Jr
F		Tony Madison	6 ft 4 in (1.93 m)	—	Jr
G		Eric Matthews	6 ft 3 in (1.91 m)	—	Jr
F		Darren Laiche	6 ft 4 in (1.93 m)	—	Sr
F		Andrej Zelenbaba	6 ft 8 in (2.03 m)	—	So
F		Fred Hill	6 ft 5 in (1.96 m)	—	Sr
G		Levan Alston	6 ft 3 in (1.91 m)	—	Fr

Head coach

- Tim Floyd (Louisiana Tech)

Assistant coach(es)

Legend

- (C) Team captain
- (S) Suspended
- (I) Ineligible
- (W) Walk-on
- Injured
- Current redshirt

== Schedule and results ==
Date time, TV	Rank^{#}	Opponent^{#}	Result	Record	Site (attendance) city, state
Regular season
Dec 15, 1992*		Spring Hill	W 68–61	1–0	Lakefront Arena (2,035); New Orleans, Louisiana
Dec 19, 1992*		Texas State; UNO Classic	W 76–67	2–0	Lakefront Arena (2,115); New Orleans, Louisiana
Dec 20, 1992*		Dartmouth; UNO Classic	W 72–49	3–0	Lakefront Arena (2,050); New Orleans, Louisiana
Dec 28, 1992*		Notre Dame; USF&G Sugar Bowl Tournament	L 43–45	3–1	Lakefront Arena (5,985); New Orleans, Louisiana
Dec 29, 1992*		Texas A&M; USF&G Sugar Bowl Tournament	W 72–55	4–1	Lakefront Arena (3,478); New Orleans, Louisiana
Dec 30, 1992*		Bucknell	W 90–57	5–1	Lakefront Arena (1,569); New Orleans, Louisiana
Dec 31, 1992*		Monmouth	W 60–47	6–1	Lakefront Arena (766); New Orleans, Louisiana
Jan 2, 1993		Jacksonville	W 79–69 ^{OT}	7–1 (1–0)	Lakefront Arena (2,046); New Orleans, Louisiana
Jan 7, 1993		at Arkansas–Little Rock	W 78–62	8–1 (2–0)	Barton Coliseum (6,959); Little Rock, Arkansas
Jan 9, 1993		at Southwestern Louisiana	W 82–62	9–1 (3–0)	Cajundome (7,421); Lafayette, Louisiana
Jan 11, 1993		Texas–Pan American	W 83–62	10–1 (4–0)	Lakefront Arena (2,503); New Orleans, Louisiana
Jan 14, 1993		Arkansas State	W 60–58	11–1 (5–0)	Lakefront Arena (3,209); New Orleans, Louisiana
Jan 16, 1993		at Louisiana Tech	W 71–48	12–1 (6–0)	Thomas Assembly Center (2,587); Ruston, Louisiana
Jan 20, 1993		Lamar	W 96–77	13–1 (7–0)	Lakefront Arena (3,153); New Orleans, Louisiana
Jan 23, 1993*		No. 11 Arizona	L 69–72	13–2	Lakefront Arena (9,750); New Orleans, Louisiana
Jan 28, 1993		at Jacksonville	W 66–50	14–2 (8–0)	Swisher Gymnasium (2,352); Jacksonville, Florida
Jan 30, 1993		South Alabama	W 79–70	15–2 (9–0)	Lakefront Arena (4,281); New Orleans, Louisiana
Feb 2, 1993*	No. 25	Western Kentucky	W 89–80	16–2 (10–0)	Lakefront Arena (4,275); New Orleans, Louisiana
Feb 6, 1993*	No. 25	Southwestern Louisiana	W 73–71	17–2 (11–0)	Lakefront Arena (8,307); New Orleans, Louisiana
Feb 11, 1993	No. 25	at Texas–Pan American	W 81–63	18–2 (12–0)	UTPA Fieldhouse (2,740); Edinburg, Texas
Feb 15, 1993	No. 21	Louisiana Tech	W 69–41	19–2 (13–0)	Lakefront Arena (4,368); New Orleans, Louisiana
Feb 18, 1993	No. 21	at Lamar	W 84–73	20–2 (14–0)	Montagne Center (3,534); Beaumont, Texas
Feb 22, 1993	No. 19	at Western Kentucky	W 71–67 ^{2OT}	21–2 (15–0)	E. A. Diddle Arena (11,424); Bowling Green, Kentucky
Feb 25, 1993	No. 19	Arkansas–Little Rock	W 86–60	22–2 (16–0)	Lakefront Arena (5,052); New Orleans, Louisiana
Feb 27, 1993	No. 19	at South Alabama	W 71–62	23–2 (17–0)	Jaguar Gym (5,930); Mobile, Alabama
Mar 1, 1993	No. 17	at Arkansas State	W 52–51	24–2 (18–0)	Convocation Center (9,056); Jonesboro, Arkansas
Sun Belt Conference tournament
Mar 7, 1993*	(1) No. 17	vs. (9) Louisiana Tech; Quarterfinals	W 63–52	25–2	Mississippi Coast Coliseum (5,323); Biloxi, Mississippi
Mar 8, 1993*	(1) No. 13	vs. (4) Arkansas State; Semifinals	W 73–59	26–2	Mississippi Coast Coliseum (4,732); Biloxi, Mississippi
Mar 9, 1993*	(1) No. 13	vs. (2) Western Kentucky; Championship game	L 63–72	26–3	Mississippi Coast Coliseum (4,109); Biloxi, Mississippi
NCAA tournament
Mar 19, 1993*	(8 MW) No. 17	vs. (9 MW) Xavier; First Round	L 55–73	26–4	RCA Dome (38,387); Indianapolis, Indiana
*Non-conference game. ^{#}Rankings from AP poll. (#) Tournament seedings in parentheses. All times are in Central Time.

== Awards and honors ==
- Ervin Johnson – Sun Belt Men's Player of the Year, Third-team All-American (UPI)
- Tim Floyd – Sun Belt Coach of the Year
