= 1993 Midwestern Collegiate Conference men's basketball tournament =

- Classification: Division I
- Season: 1992–93
- Teams: 8
- Site: Market Square Arena; Indianapolis, Indiana
- Champions: Evansville (3rd title)
- Winning coach: Jim Crews (2nd title)
- MVP: Parrish Casebier (2nd MVP) (Evansville)

1992–93 Midwestern Collegiate Conference men's basketball standings
	Conf.				Overall
Team	W		L	PCT	W		L	PCT
Xavier	12	–	2	.857	24	–	6	.800
Evansville †	12	–	2	.857	23	–	7	.767
La Salle	9	–	5	.643	14	–	13	.519
Detroit Mercy	7	–	7	.500	15	–	12	.556
Duquesne	5	–	9	.357	13	–	15	.464
Butler	5	–	9	.357	11	–	17	.393
Dayton	3	–	11	.214	4	–	26	.133
Loyola (IL)	3	–	11	.214	7	–	20	.259
† 1993 MCC tournament winner

The 1993 Midwestern Collegiate Conference men's basketball tournament (now known as the Horizon League men's basketball tournament) was held March 11–13 at Market Square Arena in Indianapolis, Indiana.

Evansville defeated Xavier in the championship game, 80–69, to win their second straight (3rd overall) MCC/Horizon League men's basketball tournament title.

The Purple Aces received an automatic bid to the 1993 NCAA tournament as the #14 seed in the Southeast region. Xavier, the regular season conference co-champions, received an at-large bid as the #9 seed in the Midwest region.

== Format ==
All eight conference members participated in the tournament and were seeded based on regular season conference records.

== Bracket ==
Quarterfinals; Thursday, March 11
1	#22 Xavier	60
8	Loyola-Chicago	50
4	Detroit	57
5	Duquesne	59
3	La Salle	70
6	Butler	77
7	Dayton	66
2	Evansville	69

Semifinals; Friday, March 12
1	#22 Xavier	67
5	Duquesne	41
6	Butler	71
2	Evansville	74

Championship; Saturday, March 13
1	#22 Xavier	69
2	Evansville	80
