= Reboul =

Reboul is a surname. Notable people with the surname include:

- Duane Reboul (born 1948), American basketball coach
- Jean Reboul (1796–1864), French politician and poet
- Jean-Baptiste Reboul (1862–1926), French chef
- Marie-Thérèse Reboul (1728–1805), French painter and engraver
