= 1991–92 Evansville Purple Aces men's basketball team =

American college basketball season

1991–92 Evansville Purple Aces men's basketball

MCC Regular season champions MCC tournament champions

1992 NCAA tournament, first round
- Conference: Midwestern Collegiate Conference
- Record: 24–6 (8–2 MCC)
- Head coach: Jim Crews
- Home arena: Roberts Municipal Stadium

1991–92 Midwestern Collegiate Conference men's basketball standings
	Conf.				Overall
Team	W		L	PCT	W		L	PCT
Evansville †	8	–	2	.800	24	–	6	.800
Xavier	7	–	3	.700	15	–	12	.556
Butler	7	–	3	.700	21	–	10	.677
Dayton	5	–	5	.500	15	–	15	.500
Loyola (IL)	2	–	8	.200	13	–	16	.448
Detroit Mercy	1	–	9	.100	12	–	17	.414
† 1992 MCC tournament winner Rankings from AP Poll

The 1991–92 Evansville Purple Aces men's basketball team represented the University of Evansville in the 1991–92 NCAA Division I men's basketball season. Their head coach was Jim Crews and they played their home games at Roberts Municipal Stadium as members of the Midwestern Collegiate Conference. After winning the MCC regular season championship, the Purple Aces won the MCC tournament to receive an automatic bid to the 1992 NCAA tournament. They were defeated by UTEP in the opening round and finished 24–6 (8–2 MCC).

== Roster ==
1991–92 Evansville Purple Aces men's basketball team
Players	Coaches
Pos. / # / Name / Height / Weight / Year / Hometown; PF / / Parrish Casebier / 6 ft 4 in (1.93 m) / 205 lb (93 kg) / So / Rockport, IN	Head coach: Jim Crews (Indiana); Assistant coach(es) Legend: (C) Team captain; (S) Suspended; (I) Ineligible; (W) Walk-on; Injured; Current redshirt

== Schedule ==
Date time, TV	Rank^{#}	Opponent^{#}	Result	Record	Site (attendance) city, state
Regular season
Nov 20, 1991*		at No. 13 Oklahoma State; Preseason NIT	L 57–86	0–1	Gallagher-Iba Arena; Stillwater, Oklahoma
Dec 21, 1991*		at Murray State	W 87–80	6–2	Racer Arena; Murray, Kentucky
Dec 28, 1991*		at No. 6 Arizona	L 76–83	6–3	McKale Center; Tucson, Arizona
Dec 29, 1991*		vs. Maryland	W 75–64	7–3	McKale Center; Tucson, Arizona
Mar 9, 1992*		Notre Dame	W 74–56	22–5	Roberts Stadium; Evansville, Indiana
MCC tournament
Mar 13, 1992*		vs. Loyola Chicago; Semifinals	W 65–49	23–5	Riverfront Coliseum; Cincinnati, Ohio
Mar 14, 1992*		vs. Butler; Championship Game	W 95–76	24–5	Riverfront Coliseum; Cincinnati, Ohio
NCAA tournament
Mar 20, 1992*	(8 MW)	vs. (9 MW) UTEP; First Round	L 50–55	24–6	UD Arena; Dayton, Ohio
*Non-conference game. ^{#}Rankings from AP poll. (#) Tournament seedings in parentheses. MW=Midwest. All times are in Central Standard Time.

== Awards and honors ==
- Parrish Casebier – MCC Player of the Year
