= De La Salle High School (New Orleans) =

Private Catholic secondary school in Louisiana, United States

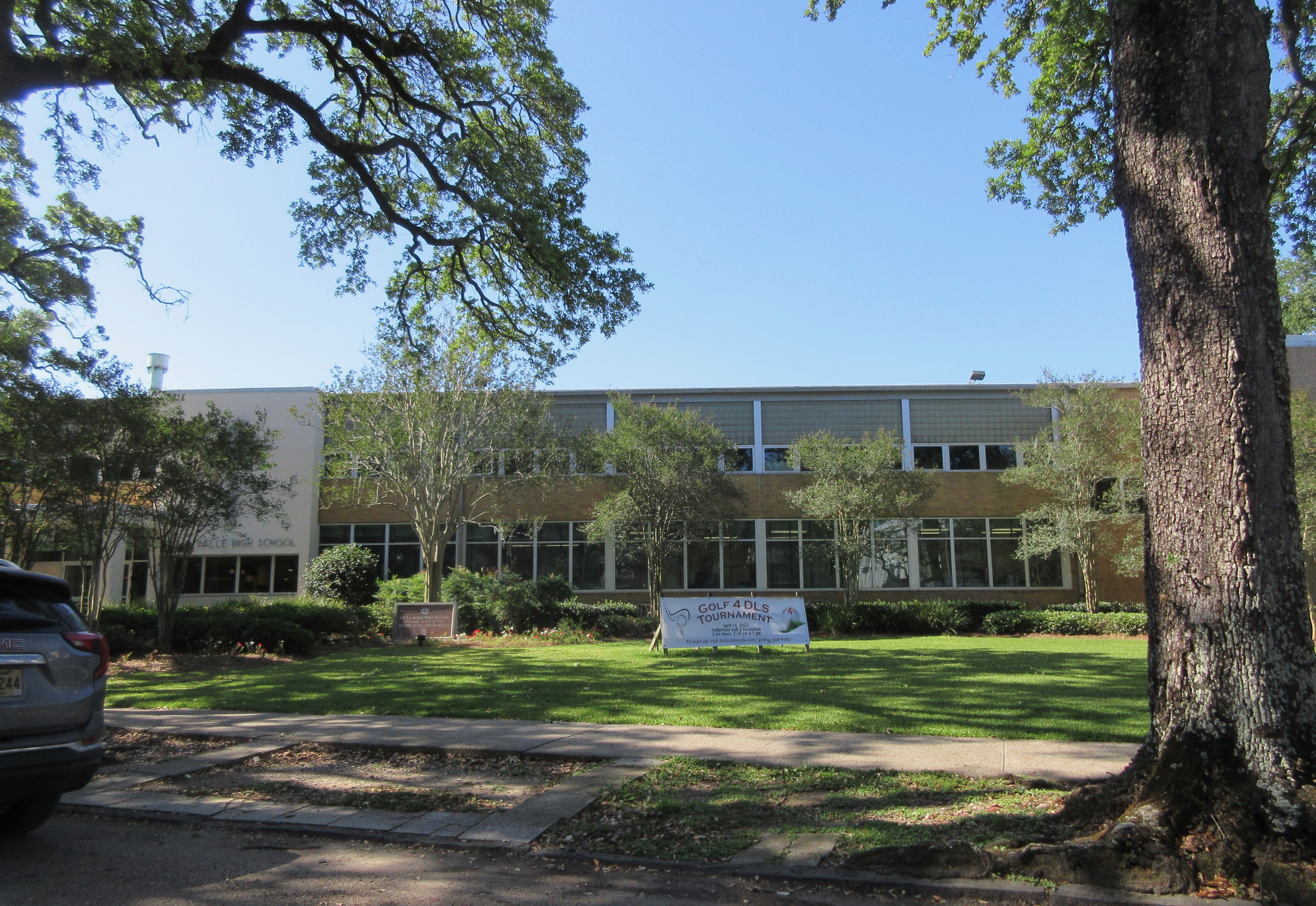

Location
- 5300 St. Charles Avenue; New Orleans, Louisiana 70115; United States; 29°55′39″N 90°6′45″W

Information
- Type: Private, Catholic, Coeducational secondary education institution
- Motto: Latin: Signum Fidei; English: Sign of Faith
- Religious affiliations: Roman Catholic (De La Salle Brothers)
- Patron saint: Saint John Baptist de La Salle
- Established: 1949
- School district: Archdiocese of New Orleans
- CEEB code: 192020
- President: Paul Kelly
- Principal: Perry Srygley Rogers
- Chaplain: Fr. Michael Schneller
- Teaching staff: 35.5 (FTE) (2019–20)
- Grades: 8–12
- Enrollment: 579 (2019–20)
- Student to teacher ratio: 16.3 (2019–20)
- Classes offered: Day
- Colors: Maroon and white
- Athletics: 17 sports teams: 10 boys' teams; 7 girls' teams
- Athletics conference: LHSAA
- Mascot: Cavalier
- Team name: Cavaliers
- Accreditation: Southern Association of Colleges and Schools
- Yearbook: Maroon Legend
- School fees: $2,380 (2023-24)
- Tuition: $9,850 (2023-24)
- Website: www.delasallenola.com

De La Salle High School is a private, Catholic secondary school run by the Institute of the Brothers of the Christian Schools in New Orleans, Louisiana. The school's campus is located at the picturesque St. Charles Avenue in uptown New Orleans, near the Audubon/University District. It was founded by the De La Salle Brothers in 1949. De La Salle High School offers grades 8 through 12. The school is affiliated with the Lasallian mission, and functions within the school system of the Roman Catholic Archdiocese of New Orleans.

== History ==
De La Salle High School is named after St. Jean-Baptiste de La Salle, the founder of the Institute of the Brothers of the Christian Schools, (the "French Christian Brothers"). De La Salle High School is a Lasallian education institution.

De La Salle High School opened in September 1949 with a freshman class of 74 boys. The founding faculty/staff of the school included four De La Salle Christian Brothers: Brother Ernest Cocagne (De La Salle's first principal), Brother August Faure, Brother John Devine, and Brother Francis Vesel. Classes were initially held in a large old home (which also served as the residence for the De La Salle Brothers) on Pitt Street, but, in 1951, De La Salle High School moved to the present building on St. Charles Avenue.

A number of additions to the school's physical plant have been made over the years. These additions have included a wing of eight classrooms on Leontine Street (1957), a gymnasium (1961), a student chapel (1961), the Brother Arsenius Center (1980), the Buck Seeber Health and Fitness Center (2003), the Life Sciences Center (2008), and the Shane and Holley Guidry Baseball and Softball Complex (2009).

De La Salle High School, which was initially an all-boys school, became coeducational in 1992.

An interesting point regarding the school's history is that De La Salle High School was the first high school to open in New Orleans following Hurricane Katrina. The school opened its doors to high school students from schools all across the city and surrounding areas.

== Athletics ==
De La Salle High School athletic programs compete as a member of the Louisiana High School Athletic Association (LHSAA). The Cavaliers competed in the New Orleans Catholic League from 1955-56 through 2002-03, when the school chose to remain in the lower classification dictated by its enrollment instead of playing up to the highest classification, which three other Catholic League members were also doing at the time.

De La Salle has 17 sports teams: 10 boys' teams and 7 girls' teams.

=== Athletic facilities ===
De La Salle High School built the Shane and Holley Guidry Batting facility for baseball and softball. The facility has two batting cages with two pitching simulators. The complex also has an area for golf and tennis.

== Notable alumni ==
- John Arthurs - Former NBA player - '65
- Lance Dunbar - NFL running back; attended but did not graduate from De La Salle High School (displaced by Hurricane Katrina)
- Robert M. Groves - Sociologist, former United States Census Bureau Director - '66
- John Hainkel - Served as both Louisiana Speaker of the House and Louisiana Senate President (deceased)
- Karl Hankton - Former NFL wide receiver
- Marquise Hill - Former NFL player (deceased)
- Chris Horton - Former NFL player
- Tad Jones - Author, music historian, and founder of Tipitina's
- Jim Letten - Former U.S. Attorney Eastern District of Louisiana - '71
- Errol Linden - Former NFL offensive tackle (deceased)
- Stanley Lombardo - Classicist, translator (Aeneid, Iliad, and Odyssey) - '61
- Sammy Martin - Former NFL wide receiver
- Gregory A. Miller - Member of the Louisiana House of Representatives from St. Charles Parish - graduated c. '80
- Al Montreuil - Former Major League Baseball player
- Mark Normand - Stand-up comedian and actor.
- Rick Pietri - American basketball coach
- Kenneth Allen Polite, Jr. - Former U.S. Attorney Eastern District of Louisiana - '93
- Duane Reboul - American basketball coach, also coached at De La Salle High School
- Dawn Angelique Richard from MTV's hit show Making the Band, Danity Kane
- Thomas John Rodi - Archbishop of Mobile - '67
- Tom Schedler - Former Secretary of State of Louisiana - '67
- Gene Taylor - Former U.S. Congressman for Mississippi - '71
- David Vitter - Former U.S. Senator from Louisiana - '79
- Jeffrey Vitter - Computer scientist, former chancellor at University of Mississippi
- Jay Weigel - Arts administrator, composer
- Frank Wills - Former Major League Baseball player (deceased)
