= 1992 WAC men's basketball tournament =

- Classification: Division I
- Season: 1991–92
- Teams: 8
- Site: Moby Arena; Fort Collins, CO
- Champions: BYU (2nd title)
- Winning coach: Roger Reid (2nd title)
- MVP: Eddie Rivera (UTEP)

1991–92 WAC men's basketball standings
	Conf.				Overall
Team	W		L	PCT	W		L	PCT
BYU †	12	–	4	.750	25	–	7	.781
UTEP	12	–	4	.750	27	–	7	.794
New Mexico	11	–	5	.688	20	–	13	.606
Utah	9	–	7	.563	24	–	11	.686
Hawaii	9	–	7	.563	16	–	12	.571
Wyoming	8	–	8	.500	16	–	13	.552
Colorado State	8	–	8	.500	14	–	17	.452
Air Force	3	–	13	.188	9	–	20	.310
San Diego State	0	–	16	.000	2	–	26	.071
† 1992 WAC tournament winner Rankings from AP poll

The 1992 Western Athletic Conference men's basketball tournament was held March 11–13 at Moby Arena at Colorado State University in Fort Collins, Colorado.

Top-seeded BYU repeated as tournament champions by defeating UTEP in the championship game, 73–71, to clinch their second overall WAC men's tournament championship. Both teams shared the WAC regular season conference title.

The Cougars, in turn, received an automatic bid to the 1992 NCAA tournament. They were joined in the tournament by UTEP, who earned an at-large bid.

== Format ==
Even though WAC membership remained fixed at nine, the tournament field dropped to eight, forcing the elimination of the play-in round game between the eighth- and ninth-seed teams. As such, only the top eight teams, again seeded based on regular season conference records, participated in the tournament, all entering the tournament into the quarterfinal round.

== Bracket ==
Quarterfinals; Wednesday, March 11
1	BYU	72
8	Air Force	71
5	Hawaii	69
4	Utah	81
3	New Mexico	89
6	Wyoming	83
7	Colorado State	65
2	UTEP	66

Semifinals; Thursday, March 12
1	BYU	75
4	Utah	62
3	New Mexico	72
2	UTEP	83

Championship; Friday, March 13
1	BYU	73
2	UTEP	71
