= 1993 Sun Belt Conference men's basketball tournament =

- Classification: Division I
- Season: 1992–93
- Teams: 9
- Site: Mississippi Coast Coliseum; Biloxi, MS
- Champions: Western Kentucky (1st title)
- Winning coach: Ralph Willard (1st title)
- MVP: Darnell Mee (Western Kentucky)

1992–93 Sun Belt Conference men's basketball standings
	Conf.				Overall
Team	W		L	PCT	W		L	PCT
No. 17 New Orleans	18	–	0	1.000	26	–	4	.867
No. 20 Western Kentucky †	14	–	4	.778	26	–	6	.813
SW Louisiana	11	–	7	.611	17	–	13	.567
Arkansas State	11	–	7	.611	16	–	12	.571
Arkansas-Little Rock	10	–	8	.556	15	–	12	.556
South Alabama	9	–	9	.500	15	–	13	.536
Lamar	9	–	9	.500	15	–	12	.556
Jacksonville	3	–	15	.167	5	–	22	.185
Louisiana Tech	3	–	15	.167	7	–	21	.250
Texas-Rio Grande Valley	2	–	16	.111	2	–	20	.091
† 1993 Sun Belt Conference tournament winner Rankings from AP Poll

The 1993 Sun Belt Conference men's basketball tournament was held March 6–9 at the Mississippi Coast Coliseum in Biloxi, Mississippi.

Western Kentucky defeated top-seeded New Orleans in the championship game, 72–63, to win their first Sun Belt men's basketball tournament.

The Hilltoppers, in turn, received an automatic bid to the 1993 NCAA tournament. Fellow Sun Belt member New Orleans joined them in the tournament, earning an at-large bid.

== Format ==
Central Florida departed for the TAAC after a one-year stay in the Sun Belt, leaving the conference with only ten teams.

As such, the tournament again saw some changes. Firstly, the tournament field decreased from eleven to nine teams (UTPA, the last-placed team in the Sun Belt standings, did not participate). With all teams seeded based on regular-season conference records, the top seven teams were all placed into the quarterfinal round while the two lowest-seeded teams (besides last-placed UTPA) were placed into the preliminary first round.

== Bracket ==
First round Saturday, March 6
9	Louisiana Tech	63
8	Jacksonville	62

Quarterfinals; Sunday, March 7
1	#17 New Orleans	63
9	Louisiana Tech	52
5	Arkansas–Little Rock	60
4	Arkansas State	74
3	SW Louisiana	78
6	South Alabama	87
7	Lamar	68
2	Western Kentucky	78

Semifinals; Monday, March 8
1	#13 New Orleans	73
4	Arkansas State	59
6	South Alabama	73
2	Western Kentucky	83

Championship; Tuesday, March 9
1	#13 New Orleans	63
2	Western Kentucky	72

== See also ==
- Sun Belt Conference women's basketball tournament
