= 1992–93 Western Kentucky Hilltoppers basketball team =

American college basketball season

1992–93 Western Kentucky Hilltoppers basketball

Sun Belt Tournament Champion

NCAA Tournament, Sweet Sixteen
- Conference: Sun Belt Conference

Ranking
- Coaches: No. 16
- AP: No. 20
- Record: 26–6 (14–4 Sun Belt)
- Head coach: Ralph Willard
- Home arena: E. A. Diddle Arena

1992–93 Sun Belt Conference men's basketball standings
	Conf.				Overall
Team	W		L	PCT	W		L	PCT
No. 17 New Orleans	18	–	0	1.000	26	–	4	.867
No. 20 Western Kentucky †	14	–	4	.778	26	–	6	.813
SW Louisiana	11	–	7	.611	17	–	13	.567
Arkansas State	11	–	7	.611	16	–	12	.571
Arkansas-Little Rock	10	–	8	.556	15	–	12	.556
South Alabama	9	–	9	.500	15	–	13	.536
Lamar	9	–	9	.500	15	–	12	.556
Jacksonville	3	–	15	.167	5	–	22	.185
Louisiana Tech	3	–	15	.167	7	–	21	.250
Texas-Rio Grande Valley	2	–	16	.111	2	–	20	.091
† 1993 Sun Belt Conference tournament winner Rankings from AP Poll

The 1992–93 Western Kentucky Hilltoppers men's basketball team represented Western Kentucky University during the 1992–93 NCAA Division I men's basketball season. The Hilltoppers were led by coach Ralph Willard and future NBA player Darnell Mee. The team was Sun Belt Conference runners-up and won Sun Belt Basketball tournament. They received the conference's automatic bid to the 1993 NCAA Division I men's basketball tournament where they advanced to the Sweet Sixteen. Mee and Mark Bell made the All-Conference and SBC Tournament team; Mee was also tournament MVP.

== Schedule ==
Date time, TV	Rank^{#}	Opponent^{#}	Result	Record	Site city, state
Regular season
12/2/1992*		Jackson State	W 87–69	1–0	E. A. Diddle Arena; Bowling Green, KY
12/5/1992*		at Tennessee Tech	L 92–99	1–1	Eblen Center; Cookeville, TN
12/19/1992*		VCU	W 84–78	2–1	E. A. Diddle Arena; Bowling Green, KY
12/21/1992*		Eastern Kentucky	W 77–68	3–1	E. A. Diddle Arena; Bowling Green, KY
12/30/1992*		at Illinois-Chicago	W 82–71	4–1	UIC Pavilion; Chicago, IL
1/2/1993*		Radford	W 88–58	5–1	E. A. Diddle Arena; Bowling Green, KY
1/6/1993		at South Alabama	W 88–83	6–1 (1-0)	Mitchell Center; Mobile, AL
1/9/1993		Louisiana Tech	W 86–40	7–1 (2-0)	E. A. Diddle Arena; Bowling Green, KY
1/11/1993		Lamar	W 114–89	8–1 (3-0)	E. A. Diddle Arena; Bowling Green, KY
1/14/1993		Arkansas–Little Rock	W 92–56	9–1 (4-0)	E. A. Diddle Arena; Bowling Green, KY
1/16/1993		at Arkansas State	W 86–75	10–1 (5-0)	Convocation Center; Jonesboro, AR
1/21/1993		at SW Louisiana	L 83–84	10–2 (5-1)	Cajundome; Lafayette, LA
1/24/1993		South Alabama	L 98–101	10–3 (5-2)	E. A. Diddle Arena; Bowling Green, KY
1/27/1993		Texas–Pan American	W 105–49	11–3 (6-2)	E. A. Diddle Arena; Bowling Green, KY
1/31/1993		SW Louisiana	W 121–92	12–3 (7-2)	E. A. Diddle Arena; Bowling Green, KY
2/2/1993		at No. 25 New Orleans	L 80–89	12–4 (7-3)	Lakefront Arena; New Orleans, LA
2/6/1993		at Lamar	W 95–88	13–4 (8-3)	Montagne Center; Beaumont, TX
2/8/1993*		Southern Utah	W 96–73	14–4	E. A. Diddle Arena; Bowling Green, KY
2/11/1993		Jacksonville	W 66–58	15–4 (9-3)	E. A. Diddle Arena; Bowling Green, KY
2/13/1993		at Texas–Pan American	W 98–68	16–4 (10-3)	UTPA Fieldhouse; Edinburg, TX
2/16/1993*		at No. 22 Louisville	W 78–77	17–4	Freedom Hall; Louisville, KY
2/20/1993		Arkansas State	W 67–61	18–4 (11-3)	E. A. Diddle Arena; Bowling Green, KY
2/22/1993		No. 19 New Orleans	L 67–71	18–5 (11-4)	E. A. Diddle Arena; Bowling Green, KY
2/25/1993		at Louisiana Tech	W 76–54	19–5 (12-4)	Thomas Assembly Center; Ruston, LA
2/27/1993		at Jacksonville	W 101–66	20–5 (13-4)	Swisher Gymnasium; Jacksonville, FL
3/1/1993		at Arkansas–Little Rock	W 78–71	21–5 (14-4)	Barton Coliseum; Little Rock, AR
1993 Sun Belt Conference men's basketball tournament
3/6/1993	(2)	vs. (7) Lamar; Quarterfinals	W 78–68	22–5	Mississippi Coast Coliseum; Biloxi, MS
3/7/1993	(2)	vs. (6) South Alabama; Semifinals	W 83–73	23–5	Mississippi Coast Coliseum; Biloxi, MS
3/8/1993	(2)	vs. (1) No. 13 New Orleans; Finals	W 72–63	24–5	Mississippi Coast Coliseum; Biloxi, MS
1993 NCAA Division I men's basketball tournament
3/18/1993*	(7 SE) No. 20	vs. (10 SE) Memphis State; First Round	W 55–52	25–5	Orlando Arena; Orlando, FL
3/20/1993*	(7 SE) No. 20	vs. (2 SE) No. 6 Seton Hall; Second Round	W 72–68	26–5	Orlando Arena; Orlando, FL
3/25/1993*	(7 SE) No. 20	vs. (3 SE) No. 11 Florida State; Sweet Sixteen	L 78–81 ^{OT}	26–6	Charlotte Coliseum; Charlotte, NC
*Non-conference game. ^{#}Rankings from AP Poll (S#) during NCAA Tournament is seed with Region. (#) Tournament seedings in parentheses.
