= 1992–93 Notre Dame Fighting Irish men's basketball team =

American college basketball season

1992–93 Notre Dame Fighting Irish men's basketball
- Conference: Independent
- Record: 9–18
- Head coach: John MacLeod (2nd season)
- Home arena: Joyce Center

1992–93 NCAA Division I men's basketball independents standings
	Conf.				Overall
Team	W		L	PCT	W		L	PCT
UW-Milwaukee	-	–	-	–	23	–	4	.852
UMKC	-	–	-	–	15	–	12	.556
Southern Utah	-	–	-	–	14	–	13	.519
Northeastern Illinois	-	–	-	–	11	–	16	.407
Cal State Northridge	-	–	-	–	10	–	17	.370
Hofstra	-	–	-	–	9	–	18	.333
Notre Dame	-	–	-	–	9	–	18	.333
Central Connecticut State	-	–	-	–	8	–	19	.296
Buffalo	-	–	-	–	5	–	22	.185
Chicago State	-	–	-	–	4	–	23	.148
Sacramento State	-	–	-	–	3	–	24	.111
Rankings from AP Poll

The 1992–93 Notre Dame Fighting Irish men's basketball team represented the University of Notre Dame during the 1992–93 college basketball season. The Fighting Irish, led by 2nd year coach John MacLeod, played their home games at the Joyce Center located in Notre Dame, Indiana as Independent members. The Fighting Irish finished the regular season with a record of 9–18. Forward Monty Williams was the team's captain and leading scorer, averaging 18.5 points per game.

== Roster ==
1992–93 Notre Dame Fighting Irish men's basketball team
Players
Coaches

Pos.	#	Name	Height	Weight	Year	Hometown
G	14	Matt Adamson	6 ft 3 in (1.91 m)	176 lb (80 kg)	Sr	Fair Oaks, California
G	15	Brooks Boyer	6 ft 2 in (1.88 m)	175 lb (79 kg)	Jr	Jackson, Michigan
F	50	Carl Cozen	6 ft 6 in (1.98 m)	226 lb (103 kg)	Jr	Oak Lawn, Illinois
G	5	Ryan Hoover	6 ft 1 in (1.85 m)	185 lb (84 kg)	Fr	Roscoe, Illinois
G	24	Lamarr Justice	6 ft 2 in (1.88 m)	172 lb (78 kg)	So	Batavia, Illinois
F	35	Patrick Keaney	6 ft 5 in (1.96 m)	193 lb (88 kg)	So	Alexandria, Virginia
G	20	Keith Kuorwski	6 ft 2 in (1.88 m)	162 lb (73 kg)	Fr	Matawan, New Jersey
F/C	53	Joe Ross	6 ft 10 in (2.08 m)	236 lb (107 kg)	Jr	Wabash, Indiana
F	54	Jon Ross	6 ft 9 in (2.06 m)	230 lb (104 kg)	Jr	Wabash, Indiana
F	21	Malik Russell	6 ft 7 in (2.01 m)	208 lb (94 kg)	So	Brooklyn, New York
F	10	Sean Ryan	6 ft 4 in (1.93 m)	180 lb (82 kg)	Jr	Libertyville, Illinois
F	30	Billy Taylor	6 ft 5 in (1.96 m)	194 lb (88 kg)	So	Aurora, Illinois
G	23	Jason Williams	6 ft 1 in (1.85 m)	180 lb (82 kg)	So	Indianapolis, Indiana
F	3	Monty Williams	6 ft 8 in (2.03 m)	215 lb (98 kg)	Jr	Fredericksburg, Virginia

Head coach

- John MacLeod

Assistant coach(es)

- Jimmy Black
- Parker Laketa
- Fran McCaffery

Legend

- (C) Team captain
- (S) Suspended
- (I) Ineligible
- (W) Walk-on
- Injured
- Current redshirt

== Schedule ==
Date time, TV	Rank^{#}	Opponent^{#}	Result	Record	Site city, state
December 4		at Loyola (IL)	W 52–50	1–0	Rosemont Horizon; Rosemont, Illinois
December 6		Evansville	W 76–70	2–0	Joyce Center; Notre Dame, IN
December 8		Indiana	L 70–75	2–1	Joyce Center; Notre Dame, IN
December 11		at Providence	L 52–71	2–2	Dunkin' Donuts Center; Providence, RI
December 20		Boston College	W 73–70	3–2	Joyce Center; Notre Dame, IN
December 28		at New Orleans; USF&G Sugar Bowl Tournament	W 45–43	4–2	Kiefer Lakefront Arena (5,985); New Orleans, Louisiana
December 29		vs. Saint Joseph's; USF&G Sugar Bowl Tournament	W 68–65	5–2	Kiefer Lakefront Arena; New Orleans, Louisiana
January 2		USC	L 74–77	5–3	Joyce Center; Notre Dame, IN
January 4		at Xavier	L 60–75	5–4	Cincinnati Gardens; Cincinnati, Ohio
January 6		at Detroit	L 59–83	5–5	Calihan Hall; Detroit, Michigan
January 9		Dayton	W 71–66	6–5	Joyce Center; Notre Dame, IN
January 12		at Stanford	W 66–61	7–5	Maples Pavilion; Stanford, California
January 16		at Michigan	L 55–70	7–6	Crisler Arena; Ann Arbor, Michigan
January 18		at Butler	L 56–70	7–7	Hinkle Fieldhouse; Indianapolis, Indiana
January 23		La Salle	W 72–63	8–7	Joyce Center; Notre Dame, IN
January 27		at Missouri	L 57–73	8–8	Hearnes Center; Columbia, Missouri
January 31		at UCLA	L 65–68	8–9	Pauley Pavilion (6,251); Los Angeles, CA
February 2		St. Bonaventure	L 61–64	8–10	Joyce Center; Notre Dame, IN
February 6		Duke	L 50–67	8–11	Joyce Center; Notre Dame, IN
February 9		at Dayton	W 79–69	9–11	University of Dayton Arena; Dayton, Ohio
February 13		Kentucky	L 62–81	9–12	Joyce Center; Notre Dame, IN
February 17		Marquette	L 61–69	9–13	Joyce Center; Notre Dame, IN
February 21		at DePaul	L 62–70	9–14	Rosemont Horizon; Rosemont, Illinois
February 23		at North Carolina	L 56–85	9–15	Dean Smith Center; Chapel Hill, NC
February 25		Duquesne	L 76–80	9–16	Joyce Center; Notre Dame, IN
March 3		Valparaiso	L 66–80	9–17	Joyce Center; Notre Dame, IN
March 7		at Louisville	L 68–83	9–18	Freedom Hall; Louisville, Kentucky
*Non-conference game. ^{#}Rankings from AP Poll. (#) Tournament seedings in parentheses.

== Players selected in NBA drafts ==
Year	Round	Pick	Player	NBA club
1994	1	24	Monty Williams	New York Knicks
