= 1991–92 UTEP Miners men's basketball team =

American college basketball season

1991–92 UTEP Miners men's basketball

WAC Regular season champions

NCAA tournament, Sweet Sixteen
- Conference: Western Athletic Conference
- Record: 27–7 (12–4 WAC)
- Head coach: Don Haskins (31st season)
- Home arena: Special Events Center

1991–92 WAC men's basketball standings
	Conf.				Overall
Team	W		L	PCT	W		L	PCT
BYU †	12	–	4	.750	25	–	7	.781
UTEP	12	–	4	.750	27	–	7	.794
New Mexico	11	–	5	.688	20	–	13	.606
Utah	9	–	7	.563	24	–	11	.686
Hawaii	9	–	7	.563	16	–	12	.571
Wyoming	8	–	8	.500	16	–	13	.552
Colorado State	8	–	8	.500	14	–	17	.452
Air Force	3	–	13	.188	9	–	20	.310
San Diego State	0	–	16	.000	2	–	26	.071
† 1992 WAC tournament winner Rankings from AP poll

The 1991–92 UTEP Miners men's basketball team represented the University of Texas at El Paso in the 1991–92 college basketball season. The team was led by head coach Don Haskins. The Miners finished 27–7 (12–4 in WAC), reached the finals of the WAC tournament, and gained an at-large bid to the NCAA tournament as the No. 9 seed in the Midwest region. After defeating Evansville in the opening round, UTEP beat top-seeded Kansas to reach the Sweet Sixteen. The run ended there, as the Miners lost by two points to Cincinnati in the regional semifinal. To date, this is UTEP's deepest NCAA run since they won the national title in 1966 as Texas Western. Indeed, it was only the second time since then that the Miners survived the tournament's opening weekend.

== Roster ==
1991–92 UTEP Miners men's basketball team
Players	Coaches
Pos. / # / Name / Height / Weight / Year / Hometown; F / 25 / Marlon Maxey / 6 ft 8 in (2.03 m) / 240 lb (109 kg) / Sr / Chicago, Illinois	Head coach: Don Haskins; Assistant coach(es) Legend: (C) Team captain; (S) Suspended; (I) Ineligible; (W) Walk-on; Injured; Current redshirt

== Schedule and results ==
Date time, TV	Rank^{#}	Opponent^{#}	Result	Record	Site city, state
Regular season
Nov 23, 1991*		Texas Southern	W 83–56	1–0	Special Events Center; El Paso, Texas
Nov 26, 1991*		Chapman College	W 94–64	2–0	Special Events Center; El Paso, Texas
Nov 30, 1991*		Houston Baptist	W 95–65	3–0	Special Events Center; El Paso, Texas
Dec 3, 1991*		at New Mexico State	W 78–71	4–0	Pan American Center; Las Cruces, New Mexico
Dec 7, 1991*		New Mexico State	L 61–63	4–1	Special Events Center; El Paso, Texas
Dec 29, 1991*		Texas; Sun Bowl Carnival Championship	W 92–88	8–1	Special Events Center; El Paso, Texas
Jan 3, 1992*		at Washington	W 55–50	9–1	Hec Edmundson Pavilion; Seattle, Washington
Mar 7, 1992		New Mexico	W 72–54	23–5 (12–4)	Special Events Center; El Paso, Texas
WAC tournament
Mar 11, 1992*	(2)	at (7) Colorado State; Quarterfinals	W 66–65	24–5	Moby Arena; Fort Collins, Colorado
Mar 12, 1992*	(2)	vs. (3) New Mexico; Semifinals	W 83–72	25–5	Moby Arena; Fort Collins, Colorado
Mar 13, 1992*	(2)	vs. (1) Brigham Young; Championship Game	L 71–73	25–6	Moby Arena; Fort Collins, Colorado
NCAA tournament
Mar 20, 1992*	(9 MW)	vs. (8 MW) Evansville; First round	W 55–50	26–6	UD Arena; Dayton, Ohio
Mar 22, 1992*	(9 MW)	vs. (1 MW) No. 2 Kansas; Second Round	W 66–60	27–6	UD Arena; Dayton, Ohio
Mar 27, 1992*	(9 MW)	vs. (4 MW) No. 12 Cincinnati; Midwest Regional semifinal – Sweet Sixteen	L 67–69	27–7	Kemper Arena; Kansas City, Missouri
*Non-conference game. ^{#}Rankings from AP Poll. (#) Tournament seedings in parentheses. MW=Midwest.

== NBA draft ==
Round	Pick	Player	NBA club
2	28	Marlon Maxey	Minnesota Timberwolves
