= 1991–92 BYU Cougars men's basketball team =

American college basketball season

1991–92 BYU Cougars men's basketball

WAC Regular Season Champions WAC tournament champions

NCAA tournament
- Conference: Western Athletic Conference
- Record: 25–7 (12–4 WAC)
- Head coach: Roger Reid (3rd season)
- Home arena: Marriott Center

1991–92 WAC men's basketball standings
	Conf.				Overall
Team	W		L	PCT	W		L	PCT
BYU †	12	–	4	.750	25	–	7	.781
UTEP	12	–	4	.750	27	–	7	.794
New Mexico	11	–	5	.688	20	–	13	.606
Utah	9	–	7	.563	24	–	11	.686
Hawaii	9	–	7	.563	16	–	12	.571
Wyoming	8	–	8	.500	16	–	13	.552
Colorado State	8	–	8	.500	14	–	17	.452
Air Force	3	–	13	.188	9	–	20	.310
San Diego State	0	–	16	.000	2	–	26	.071
† 1992 WAC tournament winner Rankings from AP poll

The 1991–92 BYU Cougars men's basketball team represented Brigham Young University in the 1991–92 basketball season. Led by head coach Roger Reid, the Cougars won their second consecutive WAC title, and made their second tournament appearance under Reid. In the NCAA tournament, the Cougars were defeated by LSU in the first round to finish with an overall record of 25–7 (12–4 WAC).

== Roster ==
1991–92 BYU Cougars men's basketball team
Players	Coaches
Pos. / # / Name / Height / Weight / Year / Hometown; C / / Gary Trost / 6 ft 10 in (2.08 m) / — / Jr	Head coach: Roger Reid; Assistant coach(es) Legend: (C) Team captain; (S) Suspended; (I) Ineligible; (W) Walk-on; Injured; Current redshirt

== Schedule and results ==
Date time, TV	Rank^{#}	Opponent^{#}	Result	Record	Site city, state
Regular season
Nov 26, 1991*		at Utah State	W 82–66	1–0	Dee Glen Smith Spectrum; Logan, Utah
Dec 5, 1991*		at Tulsa	W 102–86	2–0	Tulsa Convention Center; Tulsa, Oklahoma
Dec 7, 1991*		at James Madison	W 66–63	3–0	JMU Convocation Center; Harrisonburg, Virginia
Dec 13, 1991*		Utah State; Cougar Classic	W 93–77	4–0	Marriott Center; Provo, Utah
Dec 14, 1991*		Princeton; Cougar Classic	W 65–59	5–0	Marriott Center; Provo, Utah
Dec 19, 1991*		McNeese State	W 104–64	6–0	Marriott Center; Provo, Utah
Dec 21, 1991*		Weber State	W 81–68	7–0	Marriott Center; Provo, Utah
Dec 28, 1991*		vs. No. 11 Michigan; Red Lobster Classic	L 83–86	7–1	Orlando Arena; Orlando, Florida
Dec 30, 1991*		vs. Florida; Red Lobster Classic	W 79–73	8–1	Orlando Arena; Orlando, Florida
Jan 4, 1992*		Tennessee Tech	W 95–68	9–1	Marriott Center; Provo, Utah
Jan 9, 1992		at UTEP	L 69–89	9–2 (1–0)	Special Events Center; El Paso, Texas
Jan 11, 1992		Colorado State	W 72–51	10–2	Marriott Center; Provo, Utah
Jan 16, 1992		Wyoming	W 68–59	11–2	Marriott Center; Provo, Utah
Jan 18, 1992		Air Force	W 66–45	12–2	Marriott Center; Provo, Utah
Jan 23, 1992		at Wyoming	L 67–72	12–3	Arena-Auditorium; Laramie, Wyoming
Jan 25, 1992		at Colorado State	W 79–74	13–3	Moby Arena; Fort Collins, Colorado
Jan 30, 1992*		New Mexico	W 85–65	14–3	Marriott Center; Provo, Utah
Feb 1, 1992*		No. 19 UTEP	W 80–63	15–3	Marriott Center; Provo, Utah
Feb 6, 1992*		at San Diego State	W 89–59	16–3	San Diego Sports Arena; San Diego, California
Feb 8, 1992*		at Hawaii	L 83–87	16–4	Neal S. Blaisdell Center; Honolulu, Hawaii
Feb 13, 1992*		at Air Force	W 68–60	17–4	Clune Arena; Colorado Springs, Colorado
Feb 15, 1992*		La Salle	L 80–81	17–5	Marriott Center; Provo, Utah
Feb 20, 1992*		Utah	W 58–56	18–5	Marriott Center; Provo, Utah
Feb 22, 1992		at New Mexico	L 84–95	18–6	The Pit; Albuquerque, New Mexico
Feb 27, 1992		Hawaii	W 81–64	19–6	Marriott Center; Provo, Utah
Feb 29, 1992		San Diego State	W 98–78	20–6	Marriott Center; Provo, Utah
Mar 3, 1992*		Cal State Northridge	W 100–68	21–6	Marriott Center; Provo, Utah
Mar 7, 1992		at Utah	W 87–73	22–6	Jon M. Huntsman Center; Salt Lake City, Utah
WAC Tournament
Mar 11, 1992*		vs. Air Force; Quarterfinals	W 72–51	23–6	Moby Arena; Fort Collins, Colorado
Mar 12, 1992*		vs. Utah; Semifinals	W 75–62	24–6	Moby Arena; Fort Collins, Colorado
Mar 13, 1992*		vs. UTEP; Championship Game	W 73–71	25–6	Moby Arena; Fort Collins, Colorado
NCAA Tournament
Mar 19, 1992*	(10 W)	vs. (7 W) No. 25 Louisiana State; First Round	L 83–94	25–7	BSU Pavilion; Boise, Idaho
*Non-conference game. ^{#}Rankings from AP poll. (#) Tournament seedings in parentheses.
