= 1992–93 Xavier Musketeers men's basketball team =

American college basketball season

1992–93 Xavier Musketeers men's basketball

MCC Regular season co-champions

NCAA tournament, second round
- Conference: Midwestern Collegiate Conference

Ranking
- Coaches: No. 23
- Record: 24–6 (12–2 MCC)
- Head coach: Pete Gillen (8th season)
- Assistant coach: Dino Gaudio (6th season)
- Home arena: Cincinnati Gardens

1992–93 Midwestern Collegiate Conference men's basketball standings
	Conf.				Overall
Team	W		L	PCT	W		L	PCT
Xavier	12	–	2	.857	24	–	6	.800
Evansville †	12	–	2	.857	23	–	7	.767
La Salle	9	–	5	.643	14	–	13	.519
Detroit Mercy	7	–	7	.500	15	–	12	.556
Duquesne	5	–	9	.357	13	–	15	.464
Butler	5	–	9	.357	11	–	17	.393
Dayton	3	–	11	.214	4	–	26	.133
Loyola (IL)	3	–	11	.214	7	–	20	.259
† 1993 MCC tournament winner

The 1992–93 Xavier Musketeers men's basketball team represented Xavier University from Cincinnati, Ohio in the 1992–93 season. Led by head coach Pete Gillen, the Musketeers finished with a 24–6 record (12–2 MCC), won the MCC regular season title, and received an at-large bid to the NCAA tournament as the No. 9 seed in the Midwest region. In the NCAA tournament, the Musketeers defeated No. 8 seed New Orleans, then lost to No. 1 seed Indiana in the second round.

== Roster ==
1992–93 Xavier Musketeers men's basketball team
Players
Coaches

Pos.	#	Name	Height	Weight	Year	Hometown
G	22	Jamie Gladden	6 ft 0 in (1.83 m)	—	Sr
G	25	Michael Hawkins	6 ft 0 in (1.83 m)	175 lb (79 kg)	So	Canton, Ohio
F/C	33	Brian Grant	6 ft 9 in (2.06 m)	240 lb (109 kg)	Jr	Georgetown, Ohio
F	44	Aaron Williams	6 ft 9 in (2.06 m)	210 lb (95 kg)	Sr	Rolling Meadows, Illinois
F	54	Larry Sykes	6 ft 9 in (2.06 m)	245 lb (111 kg)	So	Toledo, Ohio

Head coach

- Pete Gillen (Fairfield)

Assistant coach(es)

Legend

- (C) Team captain
- (S) Suspended
- (I) Ineligible
- (W) Walk-on
- Injured
- Current redshirt

== Schedule and results ==
Date time, TV	Rank^{#}	Opponent^{#}	Result	Record	Site city, state
Regular Season
Dec 1, 1992*		Huntington	W 113–73	1–0	Cincinnati Gardens; Cincinnati, Ohio
Dec 7, 1992*		at Ball State	W 81–78	2–0	Worthen Arena; Muncie, Indiana
Dec 9, 1992*		Kent State	W 72–56	3–0	Cincinnati Gardens; Cincinnati, Ohio
Dec 12, 1992*		at Miami (OH)	W 70–67	4–0	Millett Hall; Oxford, Ohio
Dec 18, 1992*		vs. Delaware; Daiwa NCAA Ball Tournament	W 74–66	5–0	Tokyo, Japan
Dec 20, 1992*		vs. Rice; Daiwa NCAA Ball Tournament	W 75–60	6–0	Tokyo, Japan
Dec 30, 1992*		Wichita State	W 88–54	7–0	Cincinnati Gardens; Cincinnati, Ohio
Jan 4, 1993*		Notre Dame	W 75–60	8–0	Cincinnati Gardens; Cincinnati, Ohio
Jan 9, 1993		at Detroit	L 90–97	8–1 (0–1)	Calihan Hall; Detroit, Michigan
Jan 11, 1993*		at Louisville	L 73–76	8–2	Freedom Hall; Louisville, Kentucky
Jan 16, 1993		at Dayton	W 85–58	9–2 (1–1)	University of Dayton Arena; Dayton, Ohio
Jan 19, 1993*		South Florida	W 56–53	10–2	Cincinnati Gardens; Cincinnati, Ohio
Jan 21, 1993		Butler	W 63–59	11–2 (2–1)	Cincinnati Gardens; Cincinnati, Ohio
Jan 23, 1993		at Evansville	W 74–68	12–2 (3–1)	Roberts Municipal Stadium; Evansville, Indiana
Jan 27, 1993*		at No. 4 Cincinnati	L 67–78	12–3	Myrl Shoemaker Center; Cincinnati, Ohio
Jan 30, 1993		at Loyola (IL)	W 81–64	13–3 (4–1)	
Feb 4, 1993		La Salle	W 56–49	14–3 (5–1)	Cincinnati Gardens; Cincinnati, Ohio
Feb 6, 1993		Duquesne	W 85–79	15–3 (6–1)	Cincinnati Gardens; Cincinnati, Ohio
Feb 13, 1993		Dayton	W 53–46	16–3 (7–1)	Cincinnati Gardens; Cincinnati, Ohio
Feb 17, 1993		Evansville	W 74–63	17–3 (8–1)	Cincinnati Gardens; Cincinnati, Ohio
Feb 20, 1993		at Butler	W 80–66	18–3 (9–1)	
Feb 25, 1993	No. 24	Loyola (IL)	W 68–65	19–3 (10–1)	Cincinnati Gardens; Cincinnati, Ohio
Feb 27, 1993	No. 24	Detroit	W 93–74	20–3 (11–1)	Cincinnati Gardens; Cincinnati, Ohio
Mar 2, 1993	No. 18	at La Salle	W 73–58	21–3 (12–1)	
Mar 6, 1993	No. 18	at Duquesne	L 72–88	21–4 (12–2)	
Midwestern Collegiate Conference Tournament
Mar 11, 1993*	No. 22	vs. Loyola (IL); Quarterfinals	W 60–50	22–4	Market Square Arena; Indianapolis, Indiana
Mar 12, 1993*	No. 22	vs. Duquesne; Semifinals	W 67–41	23–4	Market Square Arena; Indianapolis, Indiana
Mar 13, 1993*	No. 22	vs. Evansville; Championship game	L 69–80	23–5	Market Square Arena; Indianapolis, Indiana
NCAA Tournament
Mar 19, 1993*	(9 MW)	vs. (8 MW) No. 17 New Orleans; First round	W 73–55	24–5	RCA Dome; Indianapolis, Indiana
Mar 21, 1993*	(9 MW)	vs. (1 MW) No. 1 Indiana; Second round	L 70–73	24–6	RCA Dome; Indianapolis, Indiana
*Non-conference game. ^{#}Rankings from AP Poll. (#) Tournament seedings in parentheses. MW=Midwest. All times are in Eastern Time.
