= Jim Crews =

American basketball player and coach

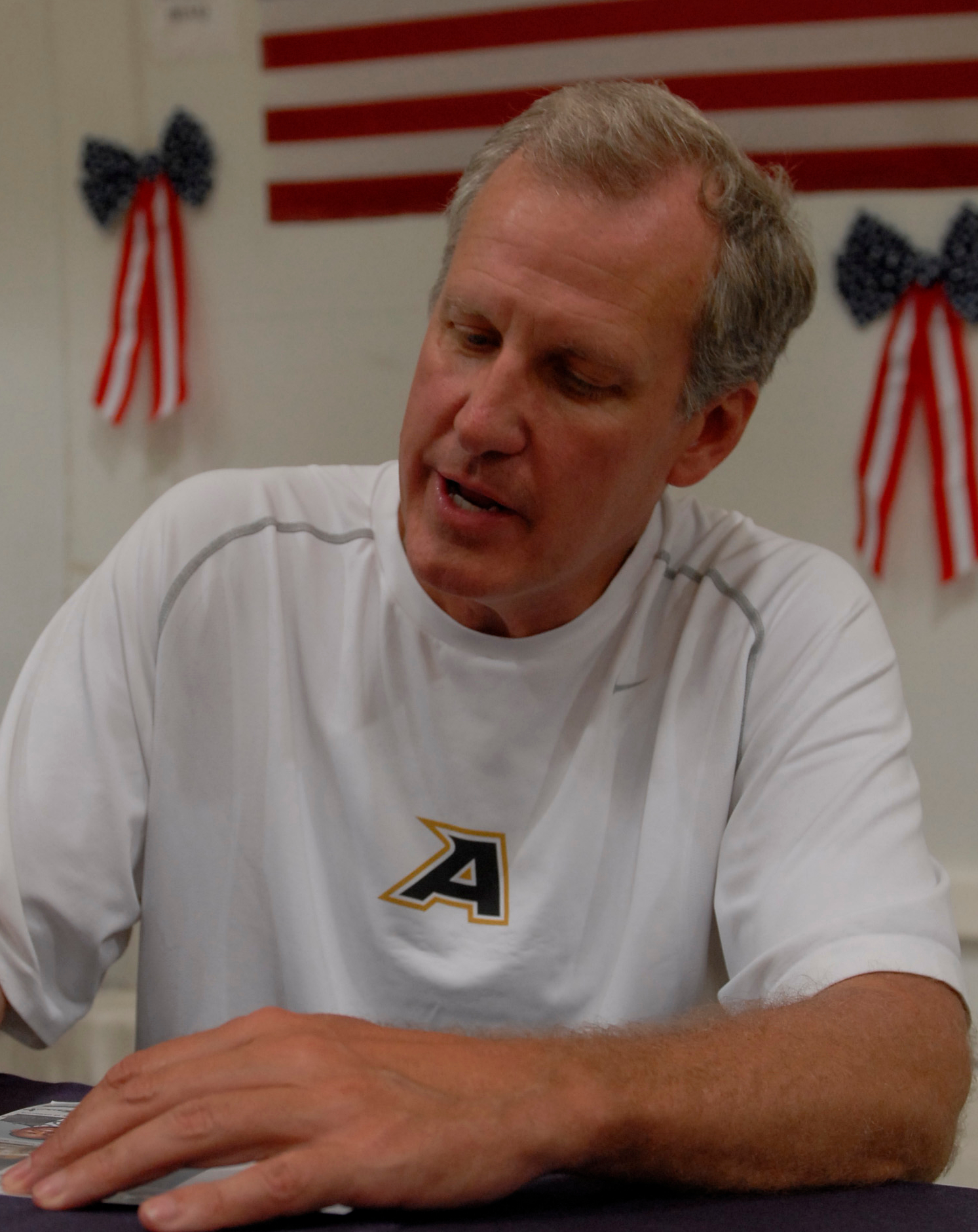
- Crews in Iraq, 2008

Biographical details
- Born: February 14, 1954 (age 72); Normal, Illinois, U.S.

Playing career
- 1972–1976: Indiana

Coaching career (HC unless noted)
- 1977–1985: Indiana (assistant)
- 1985–2002: Evansville
- 2002–2009: Army
- 2011–2012: Saint Louis (assistant)
- 2012–2016: Saint Louis

Head coaching record
- Overall: 430–405 (.515)
- Tournaments: 3–6 (NCAA Division I); 1–2 (NIT)

Accomplishments and honors

Championships
- 4 MCC regular season (1987, 1989, 1992, 1993); 2 MCC tournament (1992, 1993); MVC regular season (1999); 2 Atlantic 10 regular season (2013, 2014); Atlantic 10 tournament (2013)

Awards
- Sporting News Coach of the Year (2013); NABC Coach of the Year (2013); 3× MCC Coach of the Year (1987, 1989, 1992); MVC Coach of the Year (1999); 2× Atlantic 10 Coach of the Year (2013, 2014)

James S. Crews (born February 14, 1954) is an American former men's college basketball coach for Saint Louis University. He was promoted to head coach after serving on an interim basis following the health concerns and eventual death of former Billikens head coach Rick Majerus. He was on Majerus' staff since 2011. After leading the Billikens to a school-record 28 wins, Crews was formally named SLU's 25th head coach on April 12, 2013. He was fired after the 2016 Atlantic 10 tournament resulted in the elimination of the Billikens and marked the end of two 11–21 Billikens seasons.

Crews spent the first 13 years of his adult life at Indiana University under Bob Knight. He played on the 1976 NCAA Championship-winning team, the last undefeated champion in the men's division. After graduating, he served as an assistant on Knight's staff for eight years before moving to the University of Evansville in 1985. In 17 years, he led the Purple Aces to five NCAA Tournaments. His best team was the 1988–89 unit, which tallied the school's only NCAA Tournament win to date. He then coached at the United States Military Academy for seven years.

== Head coaching record ==
Record table
Season	Team	Overall	Conference	Standing	Postseason
Evansville Purple Aces (Midwestern Collegiate Conference) (1985–1994)
1985–86	Evansville	8–19	3–9	6th	
1986–87	Evansville	16–12	8–4	T–1st	
1987–88	Evansville	21–8	6–4	2nd	NIT Second Round
1988–89	Evansville	25–6	10–2	1st	NCAA Division I Second Round
1989–90	Evansville	17–15	8–6	5th	
1990–91	Evansville	14–14	7–7	T–5th	
1991–92	Evansville	24–6	8–2	1st	NCAA Division I First Round
1992–93	Evansville	23–7	12–2	T–1st	NCAA Division I First Round
1993–94	Evansville	21–11	6–4	T–2nd	NIT First Round
Evansville Purple Aces (Missouri Valley Conference) (1994–2002)
1994–95	Evansville	18–9	11–7	5th	
1995–96	Evansville	13–14	9–9	T–5th	
1996–97	Evansville	17–14	11–7	T–4th	
1997–98	Evansville	15–15	9–9	T–6th	
1998–99	Evansville	23–10	13–5	1st	NCAA Division I First Round
1999–00	Evansville	18–12	9–9	6th	
2000–01	Evansville	14–16	9–9	6th	
2001–02	Evansville	7–21	4–14	T–9th	
Evansville:		294–209 (.584)	143–109 (.567)		
Army Black Knights (Patriot League) (2002–2009)
2002–03	Army	5–22	0–14	8th	
2003–04	Army	6–21	3–11	7th	
2004–05	Army	3–24	1–13	8th	
2005–06	Army	5–22	1–13	8th	
2006–07	Army	15–16	4–10	T–6th	
2007–08	Army	14–16	6–8	T–5th	
2008–09	Army	11–19	6–8	4th	
Army:		59–140 (.296)	21–77 (.214)		
Saint Louis Billikens (Atlantic 10 Conference) (2012–2016)
2012–13	Saint Louis	28–7	13–3	1st	NCAA Division I Second Round
2013–14	Saint Louis	27–7	13–3	1st	NCAA Division I Second Round
2014–15	Saint Louis	11–21	3–15	14th	
2015–16	Saint Louis	11–21	5–13	T–12th	
Saint Louis:		77–56 (.579)	34–34 (.500)		
Total:		430–405 (.515)			
National champion Postseason invitational champion Conference regular season champion Conference regular season and conference tournament champion Division regular season champion Division regular season and conference tournament champion Conference tournament champion
