= Wilbur Holland =

American basketball player

Personal information
- Born: November 8, 1951 Columbus, Georgia, U.S.
- Died: October 15, 2022 (aged 70)
- Listed height: 6 ft 0 in (1.83 m)
- Listed weight: 175 lb (79 kg)

Career information
- High school: South Girard (Phenix City, Alabama)
- College: Morristown College (1971–1973); New Orleans (1973–1975)
- NBA draft: 1975: 5th round, 75th overall pick
- Drafted by: Atlanta Hawks
- Playing career: 1975–1983
- Position: Point guard
- Number: 20, 12

Career history
- 1975–1976: Atlanta Hawks
- 1976–1979: Chicago Bulls
- 1980–1981: Scavolini Pesaro
- 1981–1983: Tours BC

Career NBA statistics
- Points: 3,760 (13.6 ppg)
- Rebounds: 842 (3.1 rpg)
- Assists: 922 (3.3 apg)
- Stats at NBA.com
- Stats at Basketball Reference

Wilbur Holland (November 8, 1951 – October 15, 2022) was an American professional basketball player.

A 6'0" guard from Columbus, Georgia, Holland played college basketball at Morristown College and the University of New Orleans, where he led his team in scoring for two seasons (1973–75). During his senior year, he earned Division II Second Team All-America honors from the National Association of Basketball Coaches.

Upon graduating from college, Holland was selected by the Atlanta Hawks in the fifth round of the 1975 NBA draft. After one season with the Hawks, during which he averaged 5.8 points per game, he signed with the Chicago Bulls, and he remained with the Bulls until 1979. In the 1977 NBA Playoffs, Holland got into a fight with the Portland Trail Blazers Herm Gilliam. Holland's statistically strongest NBA season occurred in 1977–78, during which he averaged 16.6 points, 3.8 assists, 2.0 steals, and 3.6 rebounds. He ranked among the NBA's top ten in total steals twice in his career (in 1976–77 and 1977–78).

In 2002, Holland was inducted into the Louisiana Basketball Hall of Fame.

== Career statistics ==
Legend
GP	Games played	GS	Games started	MPG	Minutes per game
FG%	Field goal percentage	3P%	3-point field goal percentage	FT%	Free throw percentage
RPG	Rebounds per game	APG	Assists per game	SPG	Steals per game
BPG	Blocks per game	PPG	Points per game	**Bold**	Career high
*	Led the league

=== NBA ===
==== Regular season ====
Year	Team	GP	GS	MPG	FG%	FT%	RPG	APG	SPG	BPG	PPG
1975–76	Atlanta	33		10.6	.399	.6347	1.2	.8	.6	.1	5.8
1976–77	Chicago	79	70	31.1	.454	**.823**	3.2	3.2	**2.1**	**.2**	14.9
1977–78	Chicago	**82**	**81**	**35.2**	.443	.799	**3.6**	3.8	2.0	**.2**	**16.6**
1978–79	Chicago	**82***	56	30.3	**.473'**	.801	3.1	**4.0**	1.5	.1	12.6
Career		276	207	29.6	.452	.799	3.1	3.3	1.7	.2	13.6

==== Playoffs ====
Year	Team	GP	MPG	FG%	FT%	RPG	APG	SPG	BPG	PPG
1977	Chicago	3	28.0	.500	1.000	3.0	1.0	.3	.0	14.7
