= Melvin Simon (basketball) =

American basketball player

Personal information
- Born: April 27, 1971 (age 55)
- Listed height: 6 ft 8 in (2.03 m)
- Listed weight: 230 lb (104 kg)

Career information
- High school: Archbishop Shaw (Marrero, Louisiana)
- College: New Orleans (1990–1994)
- NBA draft: 1994: undrafted
- Position: Forward

Career highlights
- Fourth-team Parade All-American (1990); McDonald's All-American (1990)

Melvin Simon (born April 27, 1971) is an American former professional basketball player. He saw action in four years for the University of New Orleans and was among the US top 20 prep players at Archbishop Shaw High School in Marrero, Louisiana. Scouts said he was the most highly recruited high school player ever to enroll at New Orleans under coach Tim Floyd.

He works as an ELA teacher at Martin Berhman Charter School in Algiers, Louisiana.

== Basketball career ==
As a New Orleans freshman in 1990–91, Simon averaged 11.6 points and 6.6 rebounds and compiled 53 assists and 33 block shots. He started for the varsity which posted a 23-8 mark, losing to Kansas in the first round of the NCAA tournament. Simon was named Louisiana Freshman of the year and turned in the second highest rookie average in 17 years at New Orleans. In the summer after his freshman season, Simon was drafted to play in the US squad that took the Gold medal at the World Junior Championships in Edmonton. Among his teammates were Eddie Stokes, Lance Miller, Jarvis Lang, Bryan Caver, and Jamal Faulkner, The US coach was Lon Kruger.
