= Duane Reboul =

American basketball coach

Biographical details
- Born: November 9, 1948 (age 77); New Orleans, Louisiana, U.S.

Playing career
- 1969–1971: New Orleans

Coaching career (HC unless noted)
- 1971–1972: De La Salle HS (assistant)
- 1972–1976: De La Salle HS
- 1976–1982: Jesuit HS
- 1982–1985: New Orleans (assistant)
- 1986–1989: Mississippi State (assistant)
- 1989–2006: Birmingham–Southern
- 2020–2025: Samford (special assistant)

Head coaching record
- Overall: 402–124 (.764)

Accomplishments and honors

Awards
- 2x Big South Coach of the Year (2004, 2006)

Duane Reboul (born November 9, 1948) is a former basketball coach who was most recently an assistant coach at Samford. He also coached at Birmingham–Southern.

== Early life and education ==
Reboul grew up in a family of ten children in New Orleans. He attended De La Salle High School, where he was an All-State performer. He walked on to the team at the College of Santa Fe and eventually earned a scholarship. After his brother contracted spinal meningitis, Reboul left the team and returned to New Orleans. In 1969, as Ron Greene was putting together a basketball program at the University of New Orleans, he offered Reboul a scholarship after noticing him at a pickup basketball game. In his senior year in 1971, Reboul was the starting point guard on a team that was ranked No. 1 in NCAA Division II.

== Coaching career ==
After graduating from New Orleans, Reboul became an assistant at De La Salle and became the head coach after a season. He led the school to a state finals appearance in his third season. In 1976, Reboul became the head coach at Jesuit High School and led the team to six straight 20-win seasons. He joined New Orleans as an assistant in 1982 and served under Don Smith for three years. Reboul worked in real estate for a year before he met Richard Williams in 1986. Williams offered Reboul an assistant job at Mississippi State, in which capacity he served for three seasons.

In June 1989, Reboul became the 11th head coach of Birmingham–Southern, a small National Association of Intercollegiate Athletics (NAIA) institution. Reboul won two NAIA championships at 1990 and 1995. He was in favor of the move to NCAA Division I, though he thought it would be "professional suicide". In the 2003–04 season, in Birmingham–Southern's first full season as a member of Division I, the Panthers were co-champions of the Big South Conference alongside Liberty. Birmingham–Southern finished as conference runner-up in 2005 and 2006. He was named Big South Coach of the Year in 2004 and 2006. After Reboul was informed that the school would move to NCAA Division III, he stepped down in protest in July 2006. He was replaced by Mitch Cole as coach, though he remained in the physical education department. Reboul finished with a record of 402–124 in 17 seasons. Due to player defections, Birmingham–Southers did not field a basketball team in the 2006–07 season. In 2007, Reboul's wife Rainey was diagnosed with Alzheimer's disease and he decided to give up his career to provide full-time care for her. After she died on May 1, 2015, he officially retired and moved.

In December 2019, Reboul was nominated as a member of the Class of 2020 in the Alabama Sports Hall of Fame. In April 2020, Reboul came out of retirement to join the staff of Bucky McMillan, who played under Reboul at Birmingham–Southern, as a special assistant at Samford. Reboul will not be involved in recruiting but will set up much of the behind-the-scenes program
