= Michael McDonald (basketball) =

American basketball player

Personal information
- Born: February 13, 1969 (age 57) Longview, Texas
- Listed height: 6 ft 10 in (2.08 m)
- Listed weight: 232 lb (105 kg)

Career information
- High school: Longview (Longview, Texas)
- College: Utah Valley (1990–1991); New Orleans (1992–1995)
- NBA draft: 1995: 2nd round, 55th overall pick
- Drafted by: Golden State Warriors
- Playing career: 1995–2006
- Position: Center
- Number: 42

Career history
- 1995–1996: Fort Wayne Fury
- 1996: Grand Rapids Mackers
- 1996: CRO Lyon
- 1996–1998: Grand Rapids Mackers
- 1998: Charlotte Hornets
- 1998: Grand Rapids Hoops
- 1998: Fajardo Cariduros
- 1998–1999: Aisin Seahorses
- 1999: Sporting Athens
- 1999–2000: Grand Rapids Hoops
- 2000: Kombassan Konya
- 2000: Mets de Guaynabo
- 2000–2001: Lokomotiv Mineralnye Vody
- 2001–2002: UNICS Kazan
- 2002–2003: Zadar
- 2003: Dynamo Moscow Region
- 2003–2006: AEL Limassol

Career highlights
- CBA Defensive Player of the Year (1998); CBA All-Defensive Team (1998); CBA All-Rookie Second Team (1996); CBA blocks leader (1996)
- Stats at NBA.com
- Stats at Basketball Reference

Michael Dewayne McDonald (born February 13, 1969) is an American former basketball player. McDonald played college basketball for Utah Valley and New Orleans. He played one game in the NBA for the Charlotte Hornets.

== Career ==
A 6'10" and 232 lb (105 kg) center, McDonal played collegiately for Utah Valley State College (now Utah Valley University) and the University of New Orleans. In 1990–91, he averaged 12.3 points and 8.3 rebounds for Utah Valley. After sitting out a year due to his transfer, he averaged 4.2 points and 2.5 rebounds per game for New Orleans as a junior in 1992–93. During his senior year in 1994–95, he averaged 11.1 points and 9.7 rebounds with 81 blocked shots.

McDonald was selected by the Golden State Warriors with the second round pick (55th overall) in the 1995 NBA draft. The Warriors traded his rights, as well as the rights to Dwayne Whitfield and Martin Lewis, and forwards Victor Alexander and Carlos Rogers, to the Toronto Raptors in a trade for B. J. Armstrong. McDonald spent two weeks with the Raptors during the 1996 pre-season but was waived before the regular season started.

On January 21, 1998, McDonald signed a ten-day contract with the Charlotte Hornets. He played in one game for them.

McDonald was selected as the Continental Basketball Association (CBA) Defensive Player of the Year with the Grand Rapids Hoops in the 1997–98 season.
