= Parrish Casebier =

American basketball player (born 1972)

Personal information
- Born: July 18, 1972 (age 54) Owensboro, Kentucky, U.S.
- Listed height: 6 ft 4 in (1.93 m)
- Listed weight: 210 lb (95 kg)

Career information
- High school: South Spencer (Rockport, Indiana)
- College: Evansville (1990–1993)
- NBA draft: 1993: undrafted
- Playing career: 1993–2006
- Position: Power forward

Career history
- 2005–2006: Lincoln Thunder

Career highlights
- MCC Player of the Year (1992); 2× First-team All-MCC (1992, 1993)

Parrish Jason Casebier (born July 18, 1972) is an American former basketball player and convicted sexual predator. He is known for his standout college career at University of Evansville, where he was named Midwestern Collegiate Conference Player of the Year in 1992.

== Early life and college career ==
Casebier was born in Owensboro, Kentucky and was adopted at the age of two years, moving to Rockport, Indiana. He attended South Spencer High School and committed to play college basketball at Evansville from 1990 to 1993 for coach Jim Crews. Although undersized for a power forward at 6'4", Casebier's strength and energy made him successful on the court. He started three years at Evansville, scoring 1,535 points (20.2 points per game). He made the Midwestern Collegiate Conference (now the Horizon League) All-Newcomer team as a freshman and was first team all-conference for his junior and senior seasons. Casebier's best season came as a sophomore in 1991–92, as he averaged 24.4 points per game, led the Purple Aces to regular-season and tournament championships and was named MCC Player of the Year.

== Professional career ==
Following his junior year, Casebier declared his eligibility for the 1993 NBA draft. Considered undersized for his position, he went undrafted, but was invited to the Philadelphia 76ers training camp. However, he never played in the NBA. Instead, he played internationally in Argentina, England, Turkey and Venezuela. He also played minor league basketball in Lincoln, Nebraska for the Lincoln Thunder of the American Basketball Association.

== Criminal acts ==
During and after his college career, Casebier was involved in a succession of criminal activities. Prior to his sophomore season in 1991, Casebier was one of several students caught in a textbook selling scam. In 1995, he was found guilty of rape and sexual misconduct of a minor in an incident stemming from a party in Evansville.

In February, 2012, Casebier was sentenced to 25 years in federal prison for his role in leading a prostitution and sex trafficking ring in Iowa. Casebier had trafficked multiple victims and engaged in physical and sexual abuse of four women that were victimized. A 2010 investigation of the abduction and enslavement of a homeless girl, aged 19, who managed to make it to a hotel lobby alone where she sought out help, led to multiple federal charges against Casebier, his then-girlfriend and an associate.

As of July 2021, Casebier (inmate #20116-047) is housed at FCI Pekin in Pekin, Illinois. His scheduled release date is Jan. 4, 2034.
